= List of places in New York: W =

This list of current cities, towns, unincorporated communities, counties, and other recognized places in the U.S. state of New York also includes information on the number and names of counties in which the place lies, and its lower and upper zip code bounds, if applicable.

List of places in New York: A | B | C | D | E | F | G | H | I | J | K | L | M | N | O | P | Q | R | S | T | U | V | W | X | Y | Z

Name of place	Counties	Principal county	Lower zip code	Upper zip code
Waccabuc	1	Westchester County	10597	
Waddington	1	St. Lawrence County	13694	
Wadhams	1	Essex County	12990	
Wadhams Park	1	St. Lawrence County	13669	
Wading River	1	Suffolk County	11792	
Wadsworth	1	Livingston County	14533	
Wadsworth Cove	1	Livingston County		
Wahmeda	1	Chautauqua County		
Wainscott	1	Suffolk County	11975	
Waits	1	Tioga County	13827	
Wakefield	1	Bronx County	10466	
Walden	1	Erie County	14225	
Walden	1	Orange County	12586	
Walden Cliffs	1	Erie County		
Wales	1	Erie County		
Wales Center	1	Erie County	14169	
Wales Hollow	1	Erie County	14139	
Walesville	1	Oneida County	13492	
Walker	1	Monroe County	14468	
Walker	1	Oswego County		
Walker Grounds	1	Wyoming County		
Walkers	1	Wyoming County	14530	
Walkers Corners	1	Madison County		
Walker Valley	1	Ulster County	12588	
Walkleys Landing	1	Livingston County		
Wallace	1	Steuben County	14809	
Wallington	1	Wayne County	14551	
Wallins Corner	1	Montgomery County	12010	
Wallkill	1	Orange County		
Wallkill	1	Ulster County	12589	
Wallkill Camp	1	Ulster County		
Walloomsac	1	Rensselaer County	12090	
Wall Street	1	New York County	10005	
Walmore	1	Niagara County		
Walton	1	Delaware County	13856	
Walton	1	Delaware County		
Walton Lake	1	Orange County	10950	
Walton Park	1	Orange County		
Walworth	1	Wayne County		
Walworth	1	Wayne County	14568	
Walworth	1	Wayne County		
Wampsville	1	Madison County	13163	
Wanakah	1	Erie County	14075	
Wanakena	1	St. Lawrence County	13695	
Wango	1	Chautauqua County		
Wantagh	1	Nassau County	11793	
Wappinger	1	Dutchess County		
Wappinger Lake	1	Dutchess County	12590	
Wappingers Falls	1	Dutchess County	12590	
Wappingers Falls East	1	Dutchess County	12590	
Wappingers Falls North	1	Dutchess County		
Ward	1	Allegany County		
Wards Island	1	New York County	10035	
Wardwell	1	Jefferson County		
Wardwell Settlement	1	Jefferson County	13605	
Warner	1	Onondaga County		
Warners	1	Onondaga County	13164	
Warnerville	1	Schoharie County	12187	
Warren	1	Herkimer County	13439	
Warren	1	Herkimer County		
Warren	1	Jefferson County		
Warrensburg	1	Warren County	12885	
Warrensburg	1	Warren County		
Warrensburg Center	1	Warren County		
Warrens Corners	1	Niagara County	14094	
Warsaw	1	Wyoming County	14569	
Warsaw	1	Wyoming County		
Warwick	1	Orange County	10990	
Warwick	1	Orange County		
Warwick State Training School for Boys	1	Orange County		
Washington	1	Dutchess County		
Washington Bridge	1	New York County	10033	
Washington Heights	1	New York County		
Washington Heights	1	Orange County	10940	
Washington Hollow	1	Dutchess County		
Washington Hunt	1	Livingston County		
Washington Lake	1	Orange County	12550	
Washington Mills	1	Oneida County	13479	
Washingtonville	1	Orange County	10992	
Wassaic	1	Dutchess County	12592	
Waterboro	1	Chautauqua County	14747	
Waterburg	1	Tompkins County	14886	
Waterford	1	Saratoga County	12188	
Waterford	1	Saratoga County		
Water Island	1	Suffolk County	11772	
Waterloo	1	Seneca County	13165	
Waterloo	1	Seneca County		
Waterloo Mills	1	Orange County		
Water Mill	1	Suffolk County	11976	
Waterport	1	Orleans County	14571	
Waterport Station	1	Orleans County		
Waterside Park	1	Suffolk County	11768	
Watertown	1	Jefferson County	13601	
Watertown	1	Jefferson County		
Watertown Air Force Station	1	Jefferson County	13601	
Watertown Center	1	Jefferson County		
Watertown Junction	1	Jefferson County	13601	
Watertown International Airport	1	Jefferson County		
Watervale	1	Onondaga County	13104	
Water Valley	1	Erie County	14075	
Waterville	1	Jefferson County		
Waterville	1	Montgomery County		
Waterville	1	Oneida County	13480	
Waterville	1	Suffolk County		
Watervliet	1	Albany County	12189	
Watervliet Arsenal	1	Albany County	12189	
Watkins Glen	1	Schuyler County	14891	
Watkins Glen	1	Schuyler County		
Watson	1	Lewis County	13367	
Watson	1	Lewis County		
Watsonville	1	Schoharie County	12122	
Wattlesburg	1	Chautauqua County	14775	
Watts Flats	1	Chautauqua County	14710	
Wautoma Beach	1	Monroe County	14468	
Wave Crest	1	Queens County	11690	
Waverly	1	Franklin County		
Waverly	1	Tioga County	14892	
Waverly	1	Westchester County		
Wawarsing	1	Ulster County	12489	
Wawarsing	1	Ulster County		
Wawayanda	1	Orange County		
Wawbeek	1	Franklin County		
Wayland	1	Steuben County	14572	
Wayland	1	Steuben County		
Wayne	1	Schuyler County	14893	
Wayne	1	Steuben County		
Wayne Center	1	Wayne County	14489	
Wayneport	1	Wayne County		
Wayville	1	Saratoga County		
Weaver Corner	1	Madison County		
Webatuck	1	Dutchess County	12594	
Webb	1	Herkimer County		
Webb Mills	1	Chemung County	14871	
Weber Corners	1	Otsego County		
Webster	1	Monroe County	14580	
Webster	1	Monroe County		
Webster Corners	1	Erie County		
Webster Crossing	1	Livingston County	14560	
Websters Corners	1	Erie County	14127	
Wedgewood	1	Schuyler County	14891	
Weed Mines	1	Columbia County		
Weedsport	1	Cayuga County	13166	
Wegatchie	1	St. Lawrence County	13608	
Welch Hill	1	Lewis County		
Welcome	1	Otsego County	13810	
Wellesley Island	1	Jefferson County	13640	
Wellington Corner	1	Onondaga County		
Wells	1	Hamilton County	12190	
Wells	1	Hamilton County		
Wells Bridge	1	Otsego County	13859	
Wellsburg	1	Chemung County	14894	
Wellsville	1	Allegany County	14895	
Wellsville	1	Allegany County		
Wellsville	1	Montgomery County		
Wellwood	1	Oswego County		
Weltonville	1	Tioga County	13811	
Wemple	1	Albany County		
Wende	1	Erie County	14004	
Wendelville	1	Niagara County	14120	
Wesley	1	Cattaraugus County	14070	
Wesley Chapel	1	Rockland County	10901	
Wesley Hills	1	Rockland County	10977	
West Alabama	1	Genesee County		
West Albany	1	Albany County		
West Alden	1	Erie County		
West Allen	1	Allegany County		
West Almond	1	Allegany County	14804	
West Almond	1	Allegany County		
West Amboy	1	Oswego County	13167	
West Amityville	1	Nassau County	11758	
West Athens	1	Greene County		
West Babylon	1	Suffolk County	11704	
West Bainbridge	1	Chenango County	13733	
West Bangor	1	Franklin County	12991	
West Barre	1	Orleans County	14411	
West Batavia	1	Genesee County	14020	
West Bay Shore	1	Suffolk County	11706	
West Beekmantown	1	Clinton County		
West Bergen	1	Genesee County		
West Berne	1	Albany County	12023	
West Bethany	1	Genesee County	14054	
West Bloomfield	1	Ontario County	14585	
West Bloomfield	1	Ontario County		
West Branch	1	Oneida County	13303	
West Brentwood	1	Suffolk County	11717	
West Brighton	1	Monroe County		
West Brookfield	1	Madison County		
Westbrookville	1	Sullivan County	12785	
West Burlington	1	Otsego County	13482	
Westbury	2	Cayuga County	13143	
Westbury	2	Wayne County	13143	
Westbury	1	Nassau County	11590	
Westbury South	1	Nassau County		
West Bush	1	Fulton County	12078	
West Butler	1	Wayne County		
West Cambridge	1	Washington County		
West Cameron	1	Steuben County	14819	
West Camp	1	Ulster County	12490	
West Canadice Corners	1	Ontario County		
West Candor	1	Tioga County	13743	
West Carthage	1	Jefferson County	13619	
West Caton	1	Steuben County	14830	
West Catskill	1	Greene County	12414	
West Charlton	1	Saratoga County	12010	
West Chazy	1	Clinton County	12992	
West Chenango	1	Broome County	13905	
Westchester Square	1	Bronx County	10461	
Westchester County Airport	1	Westchester County	10604	
Westchester Heights	1	Bronx County	10461	
West Chili	1	Monroe County	14514	
West Clarksville	1	Allegany County	14786	
West Colesville	1	Broome County	13904	
West Conesville	1	Schoharie County	12076	
West Constable	1	Franklin County		
West Copake	1	Columbia County	12593	
West Corners	1	Broome County	13760	
West Corners	1	Saratoga County		
West Cornwall	1	Orange County		
West Coxsackie	1	Greene County	12192	
Westdale	1	Oneida County	13483	
West Danby	1	Tompkins County	14883	
West Davenport	1	Delaware County	13860	
West Day	1	Saratoga County		
West Delhi	1	Delaware County	13753	
West Dryden	1	Tompkins County	13068	
West Durham	1	Greene County	12422	
West Eaton	1	Madison County	13484	
West Edmeston	1	Otsego County	13485	
West Ellery	1	Chautauqua County		
West Ellicott	1	Chautauqua County	14701	
West Elmira	1	Chemung County	14905	
West End	1	Otsego County	13820	
West Endicott	1	Broome County	13760	
Westerlea	1	Onondaga County	13031	
Westerleigh	1	Richmond County	10314	
Westerlo	1	Albany County	12193	
Western	1	Oneida County		
Western Pine Knolls	1	Albany County	12203	
Westernville	1	Oneida County	13486	
West Exeter	1	Otsego County	13487	
Westfall	1	Monroe County		
West Falls	1	Erie County	14170	
West Farms	1	Bronx County	10460	
Westfield	1	Chautauqua County	14787	
Westfield	1	Chautauqua County		
Westford	1	Otsego County	13488	
Westford	1	Otsego County		
West Fort Ann	1	Washington County	12827	
West Fowler	1	St. Lawrence County		
West Frankfort	1	Herkimer County	13340	
West Fulton	1	Schoharie County	12194	
West Gaines	1	Orleans County	14411	
West Galway	2	Fulton County	12010	
West Galway	2	Saratoga County	12010	
Westgate	1	Monroe County	14624	
West Genesee Terrace	1	Onondaga County	13031	
West Ghent	1	Columbia County		
West Gilgo Beach	1	Suffolk County	11702	
West Glens Falls	1	Warren County	12801	
West Glenville	1	Schenectady County	12010	
West Gorham	1	Ontario County		
West Granville	1	Washington County		
West Granville Corners	1	Washington County	12887	
West Greece	1	Monroe County		
West Greenville	1	Greene County	12083	
West Greenwood	1	Steuben County	14839	
West Groton	1	Tompkins County	13073	
Westhampton	1	Suffolk County	11977	
Westhampton Beach	1	Suffolk County	11978	
West Hampton Dunes	1	Suffolk County	11021	
West Harpersfield	1	Delaware County	13786	
West Harrison	1	Westchester County	10604	
West Haverstraw	1	Rockland County	10993	
West Hebron	1	Washington County	12865	
West Hempstead	1	Nassau County	11552	
West Henrietta	1	Monroe County	14586	
West Hill	1	Schenectady County	12301	
West Hills	1	Suffolk County	11743	
West Hoosick	1	Rensselaer County	12028	
West Huntington	1	Suffolk County	11743	
West Hurley	1	Ulster County	12491	
West Islip	1	Suffolk County	11795	
West Jefferson	1	Schoharie County		
West Jewett	1	Greene County		
West Junius	1	Ontario County		
West Kendall	1	Orleans County	14476	
West Kill	1	Greene County	12492	
West Kilns	1	Clinton County		
West Kortright	1	Delaware County		
West Lathham	1	Albany County	12110	
West Laurens	1	Otsego County	13796	
Westlawn	1	Albany County	12203	
West Lebanon	1	Columbia County	12195	
West Lee	1	Oneida County	13363	
West Leyden	1	Lewis County	13489	
West Lowville	1	Lewis County	13367	
West Mahopac	1	Putnam County		
West Martinsburg	1	Lewis County	13367	
West Mecox	1	Suffolk County	11976	
West Mecox Village	1	Suffolk County		
Westmere	1	Albany County	12203	
West Meredith	1	Delaware County	13757	
West Middleburgh	1	Schoharie County	12122	
West Middlebury	1	Wyoming County	14054	
West Milton	1	Saratoga County	12020	
Westminster Park	1	Jefferson County	13607	
West Monroe	1	Oswego County	13167	
West Monroe	1	Oswego County		
Westmore Estates	1	Albany County	12203	
Westmoreland	1	Oneida County	13490	
Westmoreland	1	Oneida County		
Westmoreland	1	Suffolk County	11965	
West Mount Vernon	1	Westchester County		
West Newark	1	Tioga County	13811	
West New Brighton	1	Richmond County	10310	
West Newburgh	1	Orange County	12550	
West Notch	1	Allegany County		
West Nyack	1	Rockland County	10994	
Weston	1	Schuyler County	14837	
West Oneonta	1	Otsego County	13861	
Weston Mills	1	Cattaraugus County		
Westons Mills	1	Cattaraugus County	14788	
Westover	1	Broome County	13790	
West Parishville	1	St. Lawrence County	13676	
West Park	1	Ulster County	12493	
West Patterson	1	Putnam County		
West Pawling	1	Dutchess County	12564	
West Perry	1	Wyoming County	14530	
West Perry Center	1	Wyoming County		
West Perrysburg	1	Cattaraugus County	14129	
West Perth	1	Fulton County	12010	
West Phoenix	1	Onondaga County	13135	
West Pierrepont	1	St. Lawrence County	13617	
West Plattsburgh	1	Clinton County	12962	
West Point	1	Orange County	10966	
West Point Military Reservation	1	Orange County	10996	
Westport	1	Essex County	12993	
Westport	1	Essex County		
West Portland	1	Chautauqua County	14787	
West Potsdam	1	St. Lawrence County	13676	
West Richmondville	1	Schoharie County	12149	
West Ridge	1	Monroe County	14615	
West Ridgeway	1	Orleans County		
West Ronkonkoma	1	Suffolk County	11779	
West Rush	1	Monroe County	14543	
West St. James	1	Suffolk County	11788	
West Saint Johnsville	1	Montgomery County		
West Salamanca	1	Cattaraugus County	14779	
West Sand Lake	1	Rensselaer County	12196	
West Saugerties	1	Ulster County	12477	
West Sayville	1	Suffolk County	11796	
West Schuyler	1	Herkimer County	13503	
West Seneca	1	Erie County	14224	
West Seneca	1	Erie County		
West Settlement	1	Delaware County		
West Settlement	1	Greene County		
West Shelby	1	Orleans County	14103	
West Shokan	1	Ulster County	12494	
West Side	1	Chemung County	14905	
West Slaterville	1	Tompkins County	14881	
West Smithtown	1	Suffolk County	11788	
West Somerset	1	Niagara County	14008	
West Sparta	1	Livingston County		
West Stephentown	1	Rensselaer County	12168	
West Stockholm	1	St. Lawrence County	13696	
West Sweden	1	Monroe County		
West Taghkanic	1	Columbia County	12502	
West Tiana	1	Suffolk County	11946	
Westtown	1	Orange County	10998	
West Township	1	Albany County		
West Turin	1	Lewis County		
West Union	1	Steuben County		
West Union	1	Steuben County		
West Utica	1	Oneida County		
Westvale	1	Onondaga County	13219	
West Valley	1	Cattaraugus County	14171	
West Valley Falls	1	Rensselaer County	12185	
West Vienna	1	Oneida County		
Westview	1	Broome County	13905	
Westview	1	Livingston County	14437	
Westview Manor	1	Onondaga County		
West Village	1	New York County	10014	
Westville	1	Franklin County	12926	
Westville	1	Franklin County		
Westville	1	Otsego County	12155	
Westville Center	1	Franklin County	12926	
West Walworth	1	Wayne County	14502	
West Waterford	1	Saratoga County	12188	
West Webster	1	Monroe County	14580	
West Windsor	1	Broome County	13865	
West Winfield	1	Herkimer County	13491	
Westwood	1	Nassau County		
West Woodstock	1	Madison County		
West Yaphank	1	Suffolk County	11763	
Wethersfield	1	Wyoming County		
Wethersfield Springs	1	Wyoming County	14569	
Wetmore	1	Lewis County		
Wevertown	1	Warren County	12886	
Weyer	1	Erie County		
Whaley Lake	1	Dutchess County	12531	
Whallonsburg	1	Essex County	12994	
Wheatfield	1	Niagara County		
Wheatland	1	Monroe County		
Wheatland	1	Monroe County		
Wheatland Center	1	Monroe County		
Wheatley	1	Nassau County	11568	
Wheatley Heights	1	Suffolk County	11798	
Wheatville	1	Genesee County		
Wheatville	1	Genesee County	14013	
Wheeler	1	Steuben County	14810	
Wheeler	1	Steuben County		
Wheeler Estates	1	Schenectady County	12019	
Wheelers	1	Ontario County	14469	
Wheelertown	1	Herkimer County		
Wheelerville	1	Fulton County	12032	
Whig Corners	1	Otsego County	13326	
Whig Hill	1	Oswego County		
Whippleville	1	Franklin County	12995	
Whippoorwill	1	Westchester County	10504	
White Birches	1	Westchester County	10804	
White Bridge	1	Livingston County		
White Church	1	Tompkins County		
White City	1	Monroe County		
White Corners	1	Madison County		
White Creek	1	Rensselaer County		
White Creek	1	Washington County	12057	
White Creek	1	Washington County		
Whiteface	1	Essex County	12946	
White Fathers	1	Franklin County	12968	
Whiteford Hollow	1	Cattaraugus County		
Whitehall	1	Washington County	12887	
Whitehall	1	Washington County		
Whitehall Corners	1	Westchester County		
White Lake	1	Oneida County	13494	
White Lake	1	Sullivan County	12786	
Whitelaw	1	Madison County	13032	
White Plains	1	Westchester County	10601	07
Whiteport	1	Ulster County	12401	
Whites	1	Monroe County		
Whitesboro	1	Oneida County	13492	
Whiteside Corners	1	Saratoga County		
Whitestone	1	Queens County	11357	
White Store	1	Chenango County	13843	
Whitestown	1	Oneida County		
White Sulphur Springs	1	Sullivan County	12787	
Whitesville	1	Allegany County	14897	
Whitfield	1	Ulster County	12404	
Whitman	1	Delaware County	13804	
Whitney Crossings	1	Allegany County		
Whitney Estates	1	Albany County		
Whitney Point	1	Broome County	13862	
Whittemore	1	Tioga County		
Wiccopee	1	Dutchess County	12533	
Wickham Knolls	1	Orange County	10990	
Wickham Village	1	Orange County	10990	
Wickman Park	1	Suffolk County	11944	
Wicks Corners	1	Cayuga County		
Wicopee	1	Dutchess County		
Wilbur	1	Ulster County	12401	
Wilcox	1	Orange County		
Wildwood	1	St. Lawrence County		
Wildwood	1	Suffolk County	11792	
Wildwood Lake	1	Suffolk County		
Wiley Shelter	1	Dutchess County		
Wileytown	1	Otsego County		
Wileyville	1	Steuben County	14877	
Willard	1	Seneca County	14588	
Willet	1	Cortland County	13863	
Willet	1	Cortland County		
Willets	1	Cayuga County		
Williams Bridge	1	Bronx County	10467	
Williamsburg	1	Kings County	11211	
Williams Corners	1	Madison County		
Williams Grove	1	Onondaga County	13110	
Williams Lake	1	Ulster County	12472	
Williamson	1	Wayne County	14589	
Williamson	1	Wayne County		
Williamson Center	1	Wayne County		
Williamstown	1	Oswego County	13493	
Williamstown	1	Oswego County		
Williamsville	1	Erie County	14221	
Willing	1	Allegany County		
Williston	1	Erie County	14004	
Williston Park	1	Nassau County	11596	
Willisville	1	St. Lawrence County		
Willoughby	1	Cattaraugus County	14741	
Willow	1	Ulster County	12495	
Willow Beach	1	Ontario County		
Willow Brook	1	Chautauqua County	14712	
Willow Brook	1	Dutchess County		
Willowbrook	1	Richmond County	10301	
Willow Brook Park	1	Schenectady County	12302	
Willow Creek	1	Tompkins County		
Willowemoc	1	Sullivan County	12758	
Willow Glen	1	Onondaga County		
Willow Glen	1	Saratoga County	12118	
Willow Glen	1	Tompkins County	13053	
Willow Grove	1	Cayuga County	13140	
Willow Grove	1	Rockland County		
Willow Grove	1	Yates County		
Willow Point	1	Broome County	13850	
Willow Ridge Estates	1	Erie County	14150	
Willsboro	1	Essex County	12996	
Willsboro	1	Essex County		
Willsboro Point	1	Essex County	12996	
Willseyville	1	Tioga County	13864	
Wilmington	1	Essex County	12997	
Wilmington	1	Essex County		
Wilmot Woods	1	Westchester County	10804	10538
Wilna	1	Jefferson County		
Wilson	1	Niagara County	14172	
Wilson	1	Niagara County		
Wilson Corners	1	Cayuga County		
Wilson Creek	1	Tioga County		
Wilson Park	1	Westchester County	10591	
Wilton	1	Saratoga County	12866	
Wilton	1	Saratoga County		
Wilton State School	1	Saratoga County		
Winchell	1	Ulster County		
Winchester	1	Erie County		
Winchester	1	Erie County	14224	
Wincoma	1	Suffolk County	11743	
Windcrest Park	1	Onondaga County		
Windecker	1	Lewis County	13367	
Winderest Park	1	Onondaga County	13031	
Windham	1	Greene County	12496	
Windham	1	Greene County		
Windham-Hensonville	1	Greene County		
Winding Ways	1	Onondaga County	13152	
Windmill Farm	1	Westchester County	10504	
Windom	1	Erie County	14225	
Windsor	1	Broome County	13865	
Windsor	1	Broome County		
Windsor Beach	1	Monroe County	14617	
Winebrook Hills	1	Essex County	12852	
Winfield	1	Herkimer County		
Wing	1	Wyoming County		
Wingdale	1	Dutchess County	12594	
Winona	1	Jefferson County		
Winona Lake	1	Orange County	12550	
Winterton	1	Sullivan County	12721	
Winthrop	1	St. Lawrence County	13697	
Wirt	1	Allegany County		
Wirt	1	Allegany County		
Wiscoy	1	Allegany County	14536	
Wisner	1	Orange County	10990	
Witherbee	1	Essex County	12998	
Withey	1	Allegany County		
Wittenberg	1	Ulster County	12409	
Wolcott	1	Wayne County	14590	
Wolcott	1	Wayne County		
Wolcottsburg	1	Erie County	14032	
Wolcottsville	1	Niagara County	14001	
Wolf Hill	1	Albany County		
Wolf Pond	1	Franklin County		
Women's Rights National Historic Park	1	Seneca County	02109	
Woodard	1	Onondaga County		
Woodbourne	1	Sullivan County	12788	
Woodbury	1	Nassau County	11797	
Woodbury	1	Orange County		
Woodbury	1	Orange County		
Woodbury Falls	1	Orange County	10930	
Woodcliff Park	1	Suffolk County	11933	
Woodgate	1	Oneida County	13494	
Wood Haven	1	Queens County	11421	
Woodhaven	1	Queens County		
Woodhaven Junction	1	Queens County		
Woodhull	1	Oneida County		
Woodhull	1	Steuben County	14898	
Woodhull	1	Steuben County		
Woodinville	1	Dutchess County	12564	
Woodland	1	Onondaga County		
Woodland	1	Ulster County	12464	
Woodlands	1	Westchester County	10607	
Woodlawn	1	Bronx County	10470	
Woodlawn	1	Chautauqua County	14710	
Woodlawn	1	Erie County		
Woodlawn	1	Schenectady County		
Woodlawn Beach	1	Erie County	14225	
Woodmere	1	Nassau County	11598	
Woodridge	1	Sullivan County	12789	
Woodrow	1	Richmond County	10309	
Woodruff Heights	1	Schenectady County	12302	
Woods	1	Hamilton County		
Woodsburgh	1	Nassau County	11598	
Woods Corners	1	Chenango County	13815	
Woods Corners	1	Herkimer County		
Woods Falls	1	Clinton County	12910	
Woodside	1	Erie County		
Woodside	1	Queens County	11377	
Woods Lake	1	Herkimer County		
Woods Mill	1	Jefferson County		
Woods Mills	1	Clinton County	12918	
Woodstock	1	Greene County		
Woodstock	1	Ulster County	12498	
Woodstock	1	Ulster County		
Woodstream Farms	1	Erie County		
Woodsville	1	Livingston County	14437	
Woodville	1	Jefferson County	13698	
Woodville	1	Ontario County	14512	
Woodybrook	1	Westchester County		
Wooglin	1	Chautauqua County	14728	
Woolsey	1	Queens County	11105	
Worcester	1	Otsego County	12197	
Worcester	1	Otsego County		
Worley Heights	1	Orange County	10950	
Worth	1	Jefferson County	13659	
Worth	1	Jefferson County		
Worth Center	1	Jefferson County		
Worthington	1	Westchester County	10602	
Wright	1	Schoharie County		
Wright	1	Washington County		
Wright Park Manor	1	Oneida County	13440	
Wrights Corner	1	Wyoming County		
Wrights Corners	1	Niagara County	14094	
Wrights Corners	1	Onondaga County	13135	
Wright Settlement	1	Oneida County	13440	
WTC Battery Park City Airport	1	New York County	10004	
Wurlitzer Park Village	1	Niagara County	14120	
Wurtemburg	1	Dutchess County	12572	
Wurtsboro	1	Sullivan County	12790	
Wurtsboro Hills	1	Sullivan County	12790	
Wyandale	1	Erie County		
Wyandanch	1	Suffolk County	11798	
Wyatts	1	Schenectady County	12302	
Wyckoff	1	Cayuga County		
Wyckoff Heights	1	Kings County	11237	
Wykagyl	1	Westchester County	10804	
Wykagyl Park	1	Westchester County	10804	
Wynantskill	1	Rensselaer County	12198	
Wyomanock	1	Rensselaer County	12168	
Wyoming	1	Wyoming County	14591	
