= List of places in New York: B =

This list of current cities, towns, unincorporated communities, counties, and other recognized places in the U.S. state of New York also includes information on the number and names of counties in which the place lies, and its lower and upper zip code bounds, if applicable.

List of places in New York: A | B | C | D | E | F | G | H | I | J | K | L | M | N | O | P | Q | R | S | T | U | V | W | X | Y | Z

== Ba... ==
Name of place	Type of place	County	Zip code
Babcock Hill		Oneida	13318
Babcock Lake		Rensselaer	12138
Babylon	Town	Suffolk	11702 – 11704
Babylon	Village	Suffolk	11702 – 11704
Backus		St. Lawrence	
Bacon Hill		Saratoga	12871
Bagdad		Erie	
Baggs Corner		Jefferson	13601
Bailey		Monroe	
Baileys Gap		Ulster	
Baileys Settlement		Onondaga	
Baileytown		Orange	
Baileyville		Orange	
Bainbridge	Town	Chenango	13733
Bainbridge	Village	Chenango	13733
Bains Corner		Dutchess	
Baird Corners		Onondaga	
Baiting Hollow	Hamlet/CDP	Suffolk	11933
Baker		Livingston	
Baker Corners		Herkimer	
Bakers Mills		Warren	12811
Bakerstand		Cattaraugus	14101
Bakertown		Warren	
Balcom		Chautauqua	14138
Balcom Beach		Allegany	14777
Balcom Corners		Chautauqua	
Bald Mountain		Washington	12834
Baldwin	Town	Chemung	
Baldwin		Essex	
Baldwin	Hamlet/CDP	Nassau	11510
Baldwin Corner		Orleans	
Baldwin Harbor	CDP	Nassau	11510
Baldwin Heights		Cattaraugus	14760
Baldwin Place		Westchester	10505
Baldwinsville	Village	Onondaga	13027
Ballard Corners		Saratoga	
Ballina		Madison	13035
Ballston	Town	Saratoga	
Ballston Center		Saratoga	12020
Ballston Lake		Saratoga	12019
Ballston Spa	Village	Saratoga	12020
Balltown		Chautauqua	14062
Balmat		St. Lawrence	13609
Balmville	Hamlet/CDP	Orange	12550
Baltimore		Cortland	
B and O Junction		Genesee	
Bangall		Dutchess	12506
Bangall		Onondaga	
Bangor	Town	Franklin	12966
Bangor Station		Franklin	12966
Bank Plaza		Nassau	11566
Banksville		Westchester	10506
Baptist Corners		Cayuga	
Barberville		Rensselaer	
Barbourville		Delaware	13754
Barcelona		Chautauqua	14787
Barclay Heights		Ulster	12477
Bardeen Corners		Oswego	
Bardonia	Hamlet/CDP	Rockland	10954
Barker	Town	Broome	
Barker	Village	Niagara	14012
Barkers Grove		Washington	12154
Barkersville		Saratoga	12850
Barkertown		Livingston	14836
Barleytown		Orange	
Barnard		Monroe	
Barnegat		Dutchess	
Barnerville		Schoharie	12092
Barnes Corners		Lewis	13610
Barnes Hole		Suffolk	11930
Barnes Landing		Suffolk	
Barneveld	Village	Oneida	13304
Barney Mills		Steuben	
Barnum		Cattaraugus	
Barnum Corners		Putnam	
Barnum Island	CDP	Nassau	11558
Barre	Town	Orleans	
Barre Center		Orleans	14411
Barrett Corners		Otsego	
Barrington	Town	Yates	
Barrytown		Dutchess	12507
Barryville		Sullivan	12719
Bartlett		Oneida	13440
Bartlett Corners		Monroe	14468
Bartlett Hollow		Delaware	13775
Barton	Town	Tioga	13734
Baruch		New York	
Basket		Sullivan	12760
Basom		Genesee	14013
Batavia	City	Genesee	14020
Batavia	Town	Genesee	14020
Batchellerville		Saratoga	12134
Bates		Chautauqua	
Bates		Schoharie	12469
Bath	Town	Steuben	14810
Bath	Village	Steuben	14810
Bath Beach		Kings	11214
Battenville		Washington	12834
Baxter Estates	Village	Nassau	11050
Bay		Kings	11235
Bayberry		Onondaga	13088
Bayberry Dunes		Suffolk	11728
Bayberry-Lynelle Meadows		Onondaga	
Bayberry Park		Westchester	10804
Baychester		Bronx	10469
Bay Colony		Nassau	11510
Bay Park		Nassau	11518
Bay Point		Suffolk	11963
Bay Pond		Franklin	
Bayport	CDP	Suffolk	11705
Bay Ridge	Neighborhood	Kings	11220
Bay Shore	Hamlet/CDP	Suffolk	11706
Bay Shores		Onondaga	13110
Bayside	Neighborhood	Queens	11360
Bay Terrace		Queens	11360
Bay Terrace		Richmond	10306
Bayview		Chautauqua	
Bay View		Erie	14075
Bay View		Kings	11236
Bay View		Monroe	14617
Bayview		Suffolk	11971
Bayville	Village	Nassau	11709
Baywood	Hamlet/CDP	Suffolk	

== Be... ==
Name of place	Type of place	County	Zip code
Beach Hampton		Suffolk	11930
Beach Ridge		Niagara	14120
Beachville		Steuben	14807
Beachwood		Chautauqua	14750
Beacon	City	Dutchess	12508
Beacon Hill		Dutchess	12508
Beantown		Chemung	14859
Bear Creek		Wayne	
Beards Hollow		Schoharie	12149
Bear Mountain		Rockland	10911
Bearsville		Ulster	12409
Beartown		Clinton	
Beartown		Oneida	
Beartown		Warren	
Beaver Brook		Sullivan	12764
Beaver Dam		Schuyler	
Beaver Dam Lake		Orange	12550
Beaver Dams		Schuyler	14812
Beaver Falls	Hamlet	Lewis	13305
Beaverkill		Sullivan	12758
Beaver Meadow		Chenango	13832
Beaver River		Herkimer	13367
Beckers Corners		Albany	12158
Becks Grove		Oneida	13440
Bedell		Delaware	12430
Bedford	Town	Westchester	10506
Bedford Corners		Cattaraugus	
Bedford Hills	Hamlet	Westchester	10507
Bedford Park	Neighborhood	Bronx	
Bedford-Stuyvesant	Neighborhood	Kings	11233
Beechertown		St. Lawrence	13697
Beecherville		Oswego	
Beechford		Ulster	
Beech Hill		Westchester	
Beechhurst		Queens	11357
Beechmont		Westchester	10801
Beechmont		Westchester	10804
Beechmont Woods		Westchester	10804
Beechurst		Queens	11357
Beechwood		Monroe	14609
Beehive Crossing		Rensselaer	12090
Beekman	Town	Dutchess	
Beekman	Hamlet	Dutchess	
Beekman Corners		Schoharie	13459
Beekmantown	Town	Clinton	12901
Beekmantown	Hamlet	Clinton	
Beerston		Delaware	
Beixedon Estates		Suffolk	11971
Belair Road		Richmond	10305
Belcher		Washington	12865
Belcoda		Monroe	14546
Belden		Broome	13787
Belfast	Town	Allegany	14711
Belfast	Hamlet	Allegany	14711
Belfort		Lewis	13327
Belgium		Onondaga	13027
Bellaire		Queens	
Belle Ayr		Ulster	
Belle Harbor		Queens	
Belle Isle		Onondaga	13164
Bellerose	Village	Nassau	11426
Bellerose	Neighborhood	Queens	11426
Bellerose Terrace	Hamlet/CDP	Nassau	11426
Belle Terre	Village	Suffolk	11777
Belleview		Chautauqua	
Belleville		Jefferson	13611
Bellevue		Erie	14225
Bellevue		Schenectady	12306
Bellmont	Town	Franklin	
Bellmont Center		Franklin	12920
Bellmore	Hamlet/CDP	Nassau	11710
Bellona		Yates	14527
Bellona		Yates	14415
Bellport	Village	Suffolk	11713
Belltown		Cayuga	
Bellvale		Orange	10912
Bellview Beach		Suffolk	
Bellville		Allegany	14717
Bellwood		Lewis	13367
Belmont	Village	Allegany	14813
Belvidere		Allegany	14813
Bemis Heights		Saratoga	12170
Bemus Point	Village	Chautauqua	14712
Benedict		Fulton	
Benedict Beach		Monroe	14464
Bennets		Steuben	14823
Bennett Bridge		Oswego	13302
Bennetts		Allegany	
Bennettsburg		Schuyler	14818
Bennetts Corners		Madison	13421
Bennetts Corners		Onondaga	
Bennetts Corners		Orleans	
Bennettsville		Chenango	13733
Bennington	Town	Wyoming	14011
Benson	Town	Hamilton	12134
Benson	Hamlet	Hamilton	12134
Bensonhurst	Neighborhood	Kings	
Benson Mines		St. Lawrence	13690
Bentleys Corners		Jefferson	
Benton	Town	Yates	
Benton	Hamlet	Yates	
Benton Center		Yates	14527
Benton Corners		Ulster	
Berea		Orange	12549
Bergen	Town	Genesee	14416
Bergen	Village	Genesee	
Bergen Beach		Kings	
Bergen Beach		Seneca	14847
Bergen Park		Suffolk	11746
Bergholtz		Niagara	14304
Berkshire		Fulton	12078
Berkshire		Onondaga	13066
Berkshire	Town	Tioga	13736
Berkshire	Hamlet	Tioga	
Berkshire Association		Onondaga	
Berkshire Terrace		Putnam	10512
Berlin	Town	Rensselaer	12022
Berlin	Hamlet	Rensselaer	12022
Berne	Town	Albany	12023
Berne	Hamlet	Albany	12023
Bernhards Bay		Oswego	13028
Berryville		Montgomery	
Berwyn		Onondaga	13084
Besemer		Tompkins	
Best		Rensselaer	12018
Bethany	Town	Genesee	14054
Bethany Center	Hamlet	Genesee	14054
Bethel		Dutchess	12567
Bethel	Town	Sullivan	12720
Bethel	Hamlet	Sullivan	
Bethel Corners		Cayuga	13111
Bethel Corners		Oswego	
Bethel Grove		Tompkins	14850
Bethford		Erie	14225
Bethlehem	Town	Albany	
Bethlehem Center	Hamlet	Albany	12077
Bethlehem Heights	Location	Albany	12161
Bethpage	Hamlet/CDP	Nassau	11714
Bettsburg		Chenango	
Beukendaal		Schenectady	12302
Beulah		Monroe	
Beverly Inn Corners		Otsego	13315
Beyers Corners		Fulton	

== Bi... ==
Name of place	Type of place	County	Zip code
Bible School Park		Broome	13737
Bidwell		Erie	14222
Big Bay		Oswego	
Big Bend	Location	Onondaga	
Big Brook		Oneida	13486
Big Creek		Steuben	
Bigelow		St. Lawrence	
Big Flats	town	Chemung	14814
Big Flats	CDP	Chemung	
Big Flats Airport	CDP	Chemung	
Big Hollow		Warren	
Big Indian		Ulster	12410
Big Island		Orange	10924
Big Moose		Herkimer	13331
Big Tree		Erie	14225
Big Wolf Lake		Franklin	12986
Billings		Dutchess	12510
Billington Bay		Madison	13030
Billington Heights	Hamlet/CDP	Erie	14052
Billsboro		Ontario	
Billsboro Corners		Ontario	
Biltmore Shores		Nassau	11758
Bingham Mills		Columbia	
Binghamton	City	Broome	13901 - 13999
Binghamton State Hospital		Broome	
Bingley		Madison	13035
Binnewater		Ulster	12401
Birchton		Saratoga	
Birchwood		Nassau	
Bird		Cattaraugus	14101
Birdsall	Town	Allegany	14709
Birmingham Corners		Herkimer	
Bishas Mill		Jefferson	
Bishop Street		Jefferson	13605
Bishopville		Allegany	14807

== Bl... ==
Name of place	Type of place	County	Zip code
Blackbridge		Hamilton	
Black Brook	Town	Clinton	12912
Black Brook	Hamlet	Clinton	
Black Corners		Chautauqua	
Black Creek	Hamlet	Allegany	14714
Black Lake		Sullivan	
Blackmans Corners		Clinton	12959
Blackmans Corners		Oneida	
Black River	Village	Jefferson	13612
Black Rock		Cayuga	
Black Rock (City of Buffalo)	Neighborhood	Erie	
Blackwatch Hills		Monroe	14450
Blairville		Niagara	
Blakeley		Erie	14052
Blakeslee		Madison	
Blasdell	Village	Erie	14219
Blatchley		Broome	
Blauvelt	Hamlet/CDP	Rockland	10913
Bleecker		Fulton	12078
Bleecker		Fulton	
Bleecker Center		Fulton	
Blenheim		Schoharie	
Bliss		Wyoming	14024
Blissville		Queens	
Blockville		Chautauqua	14710
Blodgett Mills		Cortland	13738
Bloomerville		Steuben	
Bloomfield		Ontario	
Bloomfield		Richmond	10314
Bloomfield Park		Oneida	
Bloomingburg		Sullivan	12721
Bloomingburgh		Sullivan	12721
Bloomingdale		Essex	12913
Blooming Grove		Orange	10914
Blooming Grove		Orange	
Bloomington		Ulster	12411
Bloomington-Hickory Bush		Ulster	
Bloomville		Delaware	13739
Blossom		Erie	
Blossvale		Oneida	13308
Blue Mountain		Ulster	12477
Blue Mountain Lake		Hamilton	12812
Blue Point		Suffolk	11715
Blue Ridge		Essex	12870
Blue Store		Columbia	12526
Bluff Point		Clinton	
Bluff Point		Yates	14478
Blythebourne		Kings	11219

== Bo... ==
Name of place	Type of place	County	Zip code
Boardmanville		Cattaraugus	14760
Boght Corners		Albany	12047
Bohemia		Suffolk	11716
Boiceville		Ulster	12412
Bolivar		Allegany	14715
Bolivar		Allegany	
Bolivar		Madison	
Bolton		Warren	12824
Bolton		Warren	
Bolton Landing		Warren	12814
Bolts Corners		Cayuga	13147
Bombay		Franklin	12914
Bombay		Franklin	
Bonaparte		Lewis	
Bonila		Chautauqua	
Bonney		Chenango	13464
Bonni Castle		Wayne	14590
Bonnie Crest		Westchester	
Bonny Hill		Steuben	
Boomertown		Chautauqua	
Boonville		Oneida	13309
Boonville		Oneida	
Boquet		Essex	12936
Borden		Steuben	14801
Borden Estate		Ulster	
Border City		Ontario	14456
Border City		Seneca	14456
Boreas River		Essex	
Borodino		Onondaga	13152
Borodino Landing		Onondaga	
Borough Hall		Queens	11424
Borough Park		Kings	
Boston		Erie	14025
Boston		Erie	
Boston Center		Erie	
Boston Corner		Columbia	12546
Bostwick Corners		Tompkins	
Boswell Corners		Ontario	
Botanical		Bronx	10458
Botanical Gardens		Bronx	
Bouckville		Madison	13310
Boughton Hill		Ontario	14564
Boulevard		Bronx	10459
Boultons Beach		Jefferson	13685
Bouquet		Essex	12936
Bournes Beach		Chautauqua	14787
Boutonville		Westchester	
Bovina		Delaware	13740
Bovina		Delaware	
Bovina Center		Delaware	13740
Bowen		Cattaraugus	14772
Bowens Corners		Oswego	13069
Bowerstown		Otsego	13326
Bowler		Allegany	
Bowling Green		New York	10004
Bowmansville		Erie	14026
Boylston		Oswego	
Boylston Center		Oswego	13083
Boyntonville		Rensselaer	12090
Boysen Bay		Onondaga	13030

== Br... ==
Name of place	Type of place	County	Zip code
Braddock Heights		Monroe	14612
Bradford		Steuben	14815
Bradford		Steuben	
Bradford Junction		Cattaraugus	
Bradley		Sullivan	12754
Bradtville		Fulton	
Braeside		Rensselaer	12123
Brainard		Rensselaer	12024
Brainards Corners		Otsego	13315
Brainardsville		Franklin	12915
Braman Corners		Schenectady	12053
Bramanville		Schoharie	12092
Branch		Ulster	
Branchport		Yates	14418
Brandon		Franklin	
Brandon Center		Franklin	12966
Brandreth		Herkimer	12847
Brandy Brook		St. Lawrence	
Brandywine		Schenectady	12304
Brant		Erie	14027
Brant		Erie	
Brantingham		Lewis	13312
Brant Lake		Warren	12815
Brasher		St. Lawrence	
Brasher Center		St. Lawrence	13613
Brasher Falls		St. Lawrence	13613
Brasher Iron Works		St. Lawrence	13613
Brasie Corners		St. Lawrence	13642
Brayton		Warren	
Brayton Hollow		Franklin	
Breakabeen		Schoharie	12122
Breesport		Chemung	14816
Breezy Point		Queens	11697
Brentwood		Suffolk	11717
Breukelen		Kings	11236
Brevoort		Kings	11216
Brewerton		Onondaga & Oswego	13029
Brewster		Putnam	10509
Brewster Heights		Putnam	10509
Brewster Hill		Putnam	10509
Briarcliff Manor		Westchester	10510
Briar Park		Nassau	11793
Brick House Corners		Genesee	
Brick Tavern		Columbia	
Bridge		Niagara	14305
Bridgehampton		Suffolk	11932
Bridgeport		Madison & Onondaga	13030
Bridgeport		Seneca	
Bridgeville		Sullivan	12701
Bridgewater	Town	Oneida	13313
Bridgewater	Village	Oneida	
Brier Hill		St. Lawrence	13614
Briggs		St. Lawrence	
Briggs Corner		Lewis	13367
Briggs Hollow		Tioga	
Brighton		Erie	
Brighton		Franklin	
Brighton		Kings	11235
Brighton		Monroe	14610
Brighton		Monroe	
Brighton		Otsego	13439
Brighton Beach		Kings	
Brighton Corners		Otsego	
Brighton Village		Erie	14151
Brightside		Hamilton	13436
Brightwaters		Suffolk	11718
Brinckerhoff		Dutchess	12524
Brisben		Chenango	13830
Briscoe		Sullivan	12783
Bristol		Ontario	14469
Bristol		Ontario	
Bristol Center		Ontario	14424
Bristol Springs		Ontario	14512
Broadacres		Broome	13905
Broadalbin		Fulton	12025
Broadalbin		Fulton	
Broadalbin Junction		Fulton	
Broad Channel		Queens	11693
Broadway		Queens	11106
Broadway Junction		Kings	
Brockport		Monroe	14420
Brockville		Orleans	14411
Brockway		Dutchess	
Brocton		Chautauqua	14716
Brodhead		Ulster	12494
Bromley		Onondaga	
Bronck House		Greene	
Bronx	borough	Bronx	
Bronxdale	neighborhood	Bronx	
Bronxville	village	Westchester	10708
Bronxville Heights		Westchester	
Brookdale		Monroe	
Brookdale		St. Lawrence	13668
Brookfield		Madison	13314
Brookfield		Madison	
Brookfield		Oneida	
Brookhaven		Suffolk	11719
Brookhaven		Suffolk	
Brooklyn		Cattaraugus	14729
Brooklyn		Delaware	
Brooklyn	borough	Kings	112xx;
Brooklyn Heights	neighborhood	Kings	11201;
Brooklyn Manor		Queens	
Brooklyn Military Ocean Terminal		Kings	11250
Brooklyn Naval Support Activity		Kings	11251
Brookman Corners		Montgomery	
Brooksburg		Greene	12496
Brooks Grove		Livingston	14510
Brooktondale		Tompkins	14817
Brooktondale Hamlet		Tompkins	
Brookvale		Broome	
Brookview		Rensselaer	12026
Brookville		Genesee	14005
Brookville		Nassau	11545
Brookville Park		Suffolk	11751
Broome		Schoharie	
Broome Center		Schoharie	12076
Broome County Airport		Broome	13902
Brothertown		Oneida	
Brown Center		Onondaga	
Browns Bridge		St. Lawrence	13625
Browns Corners		Jefferson	
Browns Crossing		Steuben	14830
Brownsell Corner		Rockland	
Browns Hollow		Montgomery	13317
Brownsville		Kings	11212
Brownsville		Ontario	14564
Browntown		Steuben	
Brownville		Jefferson	13615
Brownville		Jefferson	
Brownville		Ulster	
Bruceville		Ulster	12440
Brunswick		Rensselaer	
Brunswick Center		Rensselaer	
Brushton		Franklin	12916
Brutus		Cayuga	
Bruynswick		Ulster	12589
Bryant		New York	10036
Bryants Mill		Franklin	
Bryn Mawr Park		Westchester	

== Bu... ==
Name of place	Type of place	County	Zip code
Buchanan	Village	Westchester	10511
Buckhout Corners		Westchester	10510
Buckingham Estates		Rockland	10989
Buckley Hollow		Chenango	
Buckleyville		Columbia	12037
Bucks Bridge		St. Lawrence	13167
Buck Settlement		Steuben	
Buckton		St. Lawrence	13697
Bucyrus Heights		Erie	14068
Buel		Montgomery	13317
Buellville		Onondaga	13104
Buena Vista		Steuben	14823
Buffalo	City	Erie	14201 - 14299
Buffalo Coast Guard Base		Erie	
Buffalo Corners		Wyoming	
Buffalo Creek		Erie	
Buffalo Junction		Erie	
Buffalo Lake		Erie	
Bullet Hole		Putnam	
Bull Hill		Herkimer	13324
Bull Mine		Orange	
Bull Run		Ulster	
Bulls Head		Dutchess	
Bulls Head		Monroe	14611
Bulls Head		Richmond	10314
Bullville		Orange	10915
Bulsontown		Rockland	
Bundy Crossing		Oswego	
Bundys		Oswego	13126
Bunker		Cayuga	
Burden		Columbia	
Burden Lake		Rensselaer	12018
Burdett		Schuyler	14818
Burgoyne		Saratoga	12871
Burke		Franklin	12917
Burke		Franklin	
Burke Center		Franklin	12917
Burk Hill		Wyoming	
Burlingham		Sullivan	12722
Burlington		Otsego	13315
Burlington		Otsego	
Burlington Flats		Otsego	13315
Burma Woods		Orleans	
Burnhams		Chautauqua	14718
Burns		Allegany	14807
Burns		Allegany	
Burnside		Orange	
Burns-Whitney Estates		Albany	12110
Burnt Hills		Saratoga	12027
Burnwood		Delaware	13756
Burrs Mills		Jefferson	13601
Burrville		Jefferson	
Burt		Niagara	14028
Burtonsville		Montgomery	12066
Bush Corner		Ontario	
Bushes Landing		Lewis	13367
Bushnell Basin		Monroe	14534
Bushnellville		Ulster	12480
Bush Terminal		Kings	11232
Bushville		Genesee	14020
Bushville		Orange	
Bushville		Sullivan	12701
Bushwick		Kings	11221
Bushwick Junction		Queens	
Buskirk		Rensselaer	12028
Busti	Town	Chautauqua	14701
Butler		Wayne	
Butler Center		Wayne	14590
Butlerville		Westchester	10519
Butterfield		Oneida	13503
Butternut Grove		Delaware	12776
Butternuts	Town	Otsego	
Butterville		Jefferson	
Butterville		Ulster	
Button City		Chenango	
Butts Corner		Delaware	
Byersville		Livingston	14517
Byrdcliffe		Ulster	
Byron	Town	Genesee	14422
