= List of places in New York: R =

This list of current cities, towns, unincorporated communities, counties, and other recognized places in the U.S. state of New York also includes information on the number and names of counties in which the place lies, and its lower and upper zip code bounds, if applicable.

List of places in New York: A | B | C | D | E | F | G | H | I | J | K | L | M | N | O | P | Q | R | S | T | U | V | W | X | Y | Z

Name of place	Counties	Principal county	Lower zip code	Upper zip code
Raceville	1	Washington County	12849	
Radio City Music Hall	1	New York County	10019	
Radison	1	Onondaga County	13027	
Rainbow Lake	1	Franklin County	12976	
Rainbow Shores	1	Oswego County	13142	
Ralmar Park	1	Schenectady County	12302	
Ramapo	1	Rockland County	10931	
Ramona Beach	1	Oswego County	13142	
Rampasture	1	Suffolk County	11946	
Randall	1	Montgomery County	12142	
Randall Corner	1	Saratoga County	12822	
Randallsville	1	Madison County	13346	
Randelville	1	Orange County		
Randolph	1	Cattaraugus County	14772	
Ransomville	1	Niagara County	14131	
Rapids	1	Niagara County	14094	
Raquette Lake	1	Hamilton County	13436	
Raquette River	1	St. Lawrence County		
Rasbach Corner	1	Fulton County		
Rathbone	1	Steuben County	14801	
Ravena	1	Albany County	12143	
Ravenwood	1	Albany County	12212	
Rawson	1	Allegany County	14727	
Ray	1	Genesee County		
Ray Brook	1	Essex County	12977	
Raymertown	1	Rensselaer County	12180	
Raymond	1	Niagara County		
Raymondville	1	St. Lawrence County	13678	
Rays Corners	1	Cattaraugus County		
Rayville	1	Columbia County		
Readburn	1	Delaware County	13856	
Reading	1	Schuyler County		
Reading Center	1	Schuyler County	14876	
Reber	1	Essex County	12996	
Rector	1	Lewis County	13367	
Rectors	1	Schenectady County		
Redbird	1	Chautauqua County		
Red Bunch Corners	1	Fulton County		
Red Creek	1	Suffolk County	11946	
Red Creek	1	Wayne County	13143	
Red Falls	1	Greene County	12468	
Redfalls	1	Greene County		
Redfield	1	Oswego County	13437	
Redfield	1	Oswego County		
Redford	1	Clinton County	12978	
Red Hook	1	Dutchess County	12571	
Red Hook	1	Dutchess County		
Red Hook	1	Kings County	11231	
Red Hook Mills	1	Dutchess County		
Red House	1	Cattaraugus County	14779	
Red House	1	Cattaraugus County		
Redman Corners	1	Monroe County		
Red Mill	1	Oswego County		
Red Mills	1	Columbia County		
Red Mills	1	St. Lawrence County	13669	
Red Mills	1	Tompkins County		
Red Mills	1	Ulster County		
Red Oaks Mill	1	Dutchess County	12603	
Red Rock	1	Columbia County	12060	
Red Rock	1	Onondaga County	13027	
Redwood	1	Jefferson County	13679	
Redwood	1	Suffolk County	11963	
Reed Corners	1	Chautauqua County		
Reed Corners	1	Livingston County	14437	
Reed Corners	1	Ontario County	14437	
Reedville	1	Jefferson County		
Reeves Park	1	Suffolk County	11901	
Rego Park	1	Queens County	11374	
Reidsville	1	Albany County	12186	
Relius	1	Cayuga County		
Remington Corners	1	Lewis County		
Remsen	1	Oneida County	13438	
Remsenburg	1	Suffolk County	11960	
Remsenburg-Speonk	1	Suffolk County		
Renchans	1	Steuben County		
Reniff	1	Tioga County		
Rensselaer	1	Rensselaer County	12144	
Rensselaer Falls	1	St. Lawrence County	13680	
Rensselaerville	1	Albany County	12147	
Renwick	1	Tompkins County	14850	
Republic	1	Suffolk County		
Residence Park	1	Westchester County	10805	
Resort	1	Wayne County	14516	
Result	1	Greene County		
Retsof	1	Livingston County	14539	
Retsof Junction	1	Livingston County		
Rexford	1	Saratoga County	12148	
Rexleigh	1	Washington County		
Rexville	1	Steuben County	14877	
Reydon Shores	1	Suffolk County	11971	
Reynales Basin	1	Niagara County		
Reynolds	1	Rensselaer County		
Reynolds Corners	1	Saratoga County		
Reynoldston	1	Franklin County		
Reynoldsville	1	Schuyler County	14818	
Rheims	1	Steuben County	14840	
Rhinebeck	1	Dutchess County	12572	
Rhinecliff	1	Dutchess County	12574	
Rhode Island	1	Chenango County		
Ricard	1	Oswego County	13302	
Rice Grove	1	Onondaga County	13110	
Rice Mill	1	Wayne County		
Rices	1	Jefferson County		
Riceville	1	Cattaraugus County	14171	
Riceville	1	Fulton County	12078	
Richards Field	1	Sullivan County		
Richardsville	1	Putnam County		
Richburg	1	Allegany County	14774	
Riches Corners	1	Orleans County		
Richfield	1	Otsego County	13439	
Richfield Junction	1	Oneida County		
Richfield Springs	1	Otsego County	13439	
Richford	1	Tioga County	13835	
Richland	1	Oswego County	13144	
Richmond	1	Ontario County		
Richmond	1	Richmond County		
Richmond Center	1	Ontario County		
Richmond Hill	1	Queens County	11418	
Richmond Valley	1	Richmond County	10307	
Richmondville	1	Schoharie County	12149	
Richs Corners	1	Orleans County	14411	
Richville	1	St. Lawrence County	13681	
Riders	1	Columbia County		
Riders Mills	1	Columbia County	12024	
Ridge	1	Livingston County	14510	
Ridge	1	Suffolk County	11961	
Ridgebury	1	Orange County	10973	
Ridgeland	1	Monroe County		
Ridgelea Heights	1	Niagara County		
Ridge Mills	1	Oneida County	13440	
Ridgemont	1	Monroe County	14626	
Ridgemont Plaza	1	Monroe County	14626	
Ridgeway	1	Orleans County	14103	
Ridgeway	1	Westchester County		
Ridgewood	1	Niagara County	14094	
Ridgewood	1	Oneida County	13501	
Ridgewood	1	Queens County	11385	
Rifton	1	Ulster County	12471	
Riga	1	Monroe County		
Riggsville	1	Ulster County		
Rigney Bluff	1	Monroe County	14612	
Riley Cove	1	Saratoga County	12020	
Ringdahl Court	1	Oneida County	13440	
Rio	1	Orange County	12780	
Riparius	1	Warren County	12862	
Ripley	1	Chautauqua County	14775	
Ripley Center	1	Chautauqua County		
Rippleton	1	Madison County	13035	
Risingville	1	Steuben County	14820	
Ritchfield Junction	1	Oneida County		
River	1	Monroe County	14627	
Riverbank	1	Warren County	12885	
Riverdale	1	Bronx County	10471	
Riverdale	1	Oneida County	13440	
Rivergate	1	Jefferson County		
Riverhead	1	Suffolk County	11901	
River Junction	1	Livingston County		
Riverside	1	Broome County	13795	
Riverside	1	Erie County		
Riverside	1	Otsego County	13838	
Riverside	1	Saratoga County	12118	
Riverside	1	Steuben County	14830	
Riverside	1	Suffolk County	11901	
Riverside	1	Warren County		
Riverside Estates	1	Suffolk County	11901	
Riverside-Flanders	1	Suffolk County		
Riverside Junction	1	Cattaraugus County		
Riverside Manors	1	Niagara County	14172	
Riverside Park	1	Ulster County	12401	
Riverview	1	Clinton County	12981	
Roanoke	1	Genesee County	14143	
Robbins Rest	1	Suffolk County	11770	
Roberts Corner	1	Jefferson County	13650	
Roberts Hill	1	Greene County		
Robins Island	1	Suffolk County		
Robinson	1	Clinton County		
Robinson Corners	1	Otsego County		
Robinwood	1	Hamilton County		
Rochdale	1	Dutchess County	12603	
Rochdale Village	1	Queens County	11434	
Rochelle Heights	1	Westchester County	10801	
Rochelle Park	1	Westchester County	10801	
Rochester	1	Monroe County	14601	99
Rochester	1	Ulster County		
Rochester Junction	1	Monroe County		
Rochester-Monroe County Airport	1	Monroe County	14624	
Rockaway Beach	1	Queens County	11693	
Rockaway Park	1	Queens County	11694	
Rockaway Point	1	Queens County	11697	
Rock Beach	1	Monroe County		
Rock City	1	Cattaraugus County	14760	
Rock City	1	Columbia County		
Rock City	1	Dutchess County	12571	
Rock City Falls	1	Saratoga County	12863	
Rock Cut	1	Onondaga County	13078	
Rockdale	1	Chenango County	13809	
Rockefeller Center	1	New York County	10020	
Rock Glen	1	Wyoming County	14550	
Rock Hill	1	Sullivan County	12775	
Rockhurst	1	Warren County	12820	
Rockland	1	Rockland County	10962	
Rockland	1	Sullivan County	12776	
Rockland Lake State Park	1	Rockland County	10989	
Rock Ledge Beach	1	Orleans County		
Rock Rift	1	Delaware County		
Rock Stream	1	Yates County	14878	
Rock Tavern	1	Orange County	12575	
Rockton	1	Montgomery County		
Rock Valley	1	Delaware County	12760	
Rockville	1	Allegany County	14711	
Rockville	1	Orange County	10940	
Rockville Centre	1	Nassau County	11570	
Rockville Lake	1	Allegany County	14711	
Rockwells Mills	1	Chenango County	13843	
Rockwood	1	Fulton County	12095	
Rocky Hill	1	Orange County		
Rocky Point	1	Clinton County	12901	
Rocky Point	1	Suffolk County	11778	
Rodger Corner	1	Onondaga County		
Rodman	1	Jefferson County	13682	
Roe Park	1	Westchester County	10566	
Roessleville	1	Albany County	12205	
Rogers	1	Clinton County		
Rogersville	1	Steuben County		
Rolling Acres	1	Monroe County	14559	
Rolling Hills	1	Monroe County	14450	
Rolling Meadows	1	Ulster County	12401	
Romanoff	1	Putnam County	10512	
Rombout Ridge	1	Dutchess County		
Rome	1	Essex County		
Rome	1	Oneida County	13440	
Romulus	1	Seneca County	14541	
Rondaxe	1	Herkimer County	13420	
Rondout	1	Ulster County	12401	
Ronkonkoma	1	Suffolk County	11779	
Ronkonkoma West	1	Suffolk County	11779	
Roosa Gap	1	Sullivan County	12721	
Roosevelt	1	Nassau County	11575	
Roosevelt Beach	1	Niagara County	14172	
Roosevelt Corners	1	Oswego County		
Roosevelt Field	1	Nassau County	11530	
Roosevelt Island	1	New York County	10044	
Rooseveltown	1	St. Lawrence County	13683	
Root	1	Montgomery County		
Root Center	1	Montgomery County		
Rootville	1	Otsego County		
Rosalyn Heights	1	Nassau County	11577	
Roscoe	1	Sullivan County	12776	
Rose	1	Wayne County	14542	
Rosebank	1	Richmond County	10305	
Roseboom	1	Otsego County	13450	
Rosecrans Park	1	Rensselaer County	12123	
Rosedale	1	Queens County	11422	
Rosedale	1	Westchester County		
Rose Grove	1	Suffolk County	11968	
Rose Hill	1	Onondaga County	13110	
Rose Hill	1	Seneca County		
Roseland	1	Monroe County	14580	
Roseland Park	1	Ontario County		
Rosemont Park	1	Rensselaer County	12144	
Rosendale	1	Ulster County	12472	
Rosendale Village	1	Ulster County	12472	
Roses Point	1	Orange County		
Roseton	1	Orange County	12550	
Rosiere	1	Jefferson County	13618	
Roslyn	1	Nassau County	11576	
Roslyn Air National Guard Station	1	Nassau County	11576	
Roslyn Estates	1	Nassau County	11576	
Roslyn Harbor	1	Nassau County	11576	
Roslyn Heights	1	Nassau County	11577	
Rossburg	1	Allegany County	14776	
Ross Corners	1	Broome County	13850	
Rosses	1	Livingston County		
Rossie	1	St. Lawrence County	13646	
Rossman	1	Columbia County	12173	
Ross Mill	1	Chautauqua County	14733	
Ross's Corners	1	Jefferson County	13605	
Rosstown	1	Chemung County	14871	
Rossville	1	Orange County		
Rossville	1	Richmond County	10309	
Rotterdam	1	Schenectady County	12303	
Rotterdam Junction	1	Schenectady County	12150	
Rough and Ready	1	Steuben County		
Round Lake	1	Saratoga County	12151	
Round Top	1	Greene County	12473	
Rouses Point	1	Clinton County	12979	
Rowan Corners	1	Madison County		
Roxbury	1	Delaware County	12474	
Roxbury	1	Delaware County		
Roxbury	1	Queens County	11690	
Royalton	1	Niagara County	14067	
Royalton Center	1	Niagara County		
Ruback Camp	1	Saratoga County		
Ruby	1	Ulster County	12475	
Ruby Corner	1	St. Lawrence County	13646	
Rudco	1	Dutchess County		
Rudeston	1	Hamilton County	12108	
Rugby	1	Kings County	11203	
Rumsey Ridge	1	Niagara County	14092	
Rural Grove	1	Montgomery County	12166	
Rural Hill	1	Jefferson County	13698	
Rush	1	Monroe County	14543	
Rushford	1	Allegany County	14777	
Rushford Lake	1	Allegany County	14717	
Rush Run	1	Chemung County		
Rushville	2	Ontario County	14544	
Rushville	2	Yates County	14544	
Russell	1	St. Lawrence County	13684	
Russell Gardens	1	Nassau County	11021	
Russia	1	Clinton County		
Russia	1	Herkimer County	13431	
Russ Mills	1	Oswego County		
Rutland	1	Jefferson County		
Rutland Center	1	Jefferson County	13601	
Rutsonville	1	Ulster County	12589	
Ryder	1	Kings County	11234	
Rye	1	Westchester County	10580	
Rye Brook	1	Westchester County	10573	
Rye Hills-Rye Brook	1	Westchester County	10573	
Rynex Corners	1	Schenectady County		
