= List of places in New York: F =

This list of current cities, towns, unincorporated communities, counties, and other recognized places in the U.S. state of New York also includes information on the number and names of counties in which the place lies, and its lower and upper zip code bounds, if applicable.

List of places in New York: A | B | C | D | E | F | G | H | I | J | K | L | M | N | O | P | Q | R | S | T | U | V | W | X | Y | Z

Name of place	Counties	Principal county	Lower zip code	Upper zip code
Fabius	1	Onondaga County	13063	
Factory Hollow	1	Rensselaer County		
Factory Village	1	Saratoga County	12020	
Factoryville	1	Essex County	12928	
Fairdale	1	Oswego County	13074	
Fairfield	1	Herkimer County	13336	
Fairfield	1	Herkimer County		
Fairfield	1	Tioga County		
Fairfield Farms	1	Onondaga County	13066	
Fairfield Gardens	1	Albany County	12212	
Fair Grounds	1	Albany County		
Fair Harbor	1	Suffolk County	11706	
Fair Haven	1	Cayuga County	13064	
Fair Haven	1	Cortland County	13077	
Fair Haven	1	Orleans County		
Fairlawn Estates	1	Albany County	12110	
Fairmount	1	Onondaga County	13219	
Fairmount	1	Onondaga County	13219	
Fair Oaks	1	Orange County	10940	
Fairport	1	Monroe County	14450	
Fairview	2	Allegany County	14060	
Fairview	2	Cattaraugus County	14060	
Fairview	1	Dutchess County	12601	
Fairview	1	Westchester County	10603	
Fairview	1	Wyoming County	14427	
Fairville	1	Wayne County	14513	
Fairweather Corners	1	Saratoga County		
Falconer	1	Chautauqua County	14733	
Falconer Junction	1	Chautauqua County		
Falcon Manor	1	Niagara County	14304	
Falconwood	1	Erie County	14072	
Falls	1	Niagara County	14303	
Fallsburg	1	Sullivan County	12733	
Fallsburg	1	Sullivan County		
Fallsburgh	1	Sullivan County		
Falls Junction	1	Niagara County		
Falls Mills	1	Sullivan County		
Fancher	1	Orleans County	14452	
Fantinekill	1	Ulster County		
Fargo	1	Genesee County	14036	
Fargo	1	Jefferson County		
Farleys	1	Cayuga County		
Farleys Point	1	Cayuga County	13160	
Farmers Mills	1	Oneida County		
Farmers Mills	1	Putnam County	10512	
Farmersville	1	Cattaraugus County		
Farmersville	1	Cattaraugus County		
Farmersville Center	1	Cattaraugus County	14737	
Farmersville Station	1	Cattaraugus County	14060	
Farmingdale	1	Nassau County	11735	
Farmingdale	1	Orange County		
Farmington	1	Ontario County	14425	
Farmington	1	Ontario County		
Farmingville	1	Suffolk County	11738	
Farnham	1	Erie County	14061	
Farragut	1	Kings County	11203	
Far Rockaway	1	Queens County	11601	99
Fawn Ridge	1	Onondaga County	13027	
Fay	1	Franklin County		
Fayette	1	Seneca County	13065	
Fayette	1	Seneca County		
Fayette Manor	1	Onondaga County	13066	
Fayetteville	1	Onondaga County	13066	
Fayville	1	Saratoga County		
Federal	1	Monroe County	14614	
Federal Hall National Memorial	1	New York County	10005	
Federal Reserve	1	New York County	10045	
Felters Corners	1	Rockland County		
Felts Mills	1	Jefferson County	13638	
Fenimore	1	Saratoga County	12801	
Fenner	1	Madison County		
Fenner	1	Monroe County		
Fenton	1	Broome County		
Fentonville	1	Chautauqua County	14738	
Ferenbaugh	1	Steuben County	14830	
Fergusons Corners	1	Yates County	14456	
Fergusonville	1	Delaware County	12155	
Ferndale	1	Sullivan County	12734	
Fernwood	1	Oswego County	13142	
Fernwood	1	Saratoga County	12801	
Fernwood	1	Sullivan County	12760	
Ferry Village	1	Erie County	14072	
Feura Bush	1	Albany County	12067	
Fey Mill	1	Oneida County		
Field Corners	1	Putnam County		
Field Crossing	1	Otsego County		
Fields Settlement	1	Jefferson County		
Fieldston	1	Bronx County	10463	
Filer Corners	1	Otsego County	13808	
Fillmore	1	Allegany County	14735	
Finchville	1	Orange County	10940	
Findley Lake	1	Chautauqua County	14736	
Fine	1	St. Lawrence County	13639	
Fine	1	St. Lawrence County		
Fineview	1	Jefferson County	13640	
Finger Lakes Manor	1	Ontario County	14424	
Fink Basin	1	Herkimer County	13365	
Fink Hollow	1	Oneida County		
Finnegans Corners	1	Orange County	10924	
Fintches Corners	1	Cayuga County		
Fire Island	1	Suffolk County		
Fire Island National Seashore	1	Suffolk County	11772	
Fire Island Pines	1	Suffolk County	11782	
Fireplace	1	Suffolk County		
Fireplace Lodge Girls Camp	1	Suffolk County		
Firthcliffe	1	Orange County		
Firthcliffe Heights	1	Orange County	12550	
Fish Creek	1	Lewis County	13325	
Fish Creek	1	Ulster County	12477	
Fish Creek Landing	1	Oneida County	13308	
Fish Creek Station	1	Oneida County		
Fishers	1	Ontario County	14453	
Fishers Island	1	Suffolk County	06390	
Fishers Landing	1	Jefferson County	13641	
Fisherville	1	Chemung County	14903	
Fish House	1	Fulton County	12025	
Fishkill	1	Dutchess County	12524	
Fishkill	1	Dutchess County		
Fishkill Plains	1	Dutchess County	12590	
Fishs Eddy	1	Delaware County	13774	
Fitch	1	Cattaraugus County	14743	
Fitch Point	1	Washington County		
Fitts Corners	1	Tompkins County		
Five Corners	1	Allegany County	14802	
Five Corners	1	Cayuga County	13071	
Five Corners	1	Chenango County		
Five Corners	1	Genesee County		
Five Corners	1	Madison County	13421	
Five Corners	1	Oneida County	13480	
Five Corners	1	Orleans County		
Fivemile Point	1	Broome County	13795	
Five Points	1	Cattaraugus County		
Five Points	1	Monroe County		
Five Points	1	Ontario County	14456	
Five Points	1	Otsego County		
Flackville	1	St. Lawrence County	13669	
Flagler Corners	1	Saratoga County		
Flanders	1	Suffolk County	11901	
Flatbrook	1	Columbia County	12029	
Flatbush	1	Kings County	11226	
Flatbush	1	Ulster County	12477	
Flat Creek	1	Montgomery County	13317	
Flat Creek	1	Schoharie County	12076	
Flatlands	1	Kings County		
Fleetwood	1	Westchester County	10552	
Fleischmanns	1	Delaware County	12430	
Fleming	1	Cayuga County	13021	
Fleming	1	Cayuga County		
Flemingville	1	Tioga County	13827	
Flint	1	Ontario County	14561	
Flint	1	Ulster County		
Flint Town	1	Oneida County		
Floodwood	1	Franklin County		
Floral Park	1	Nassau County	11001	04
Floral Park	1	Queens County	11001	
Florence	1	Oneida County	13316	
Florence	1	Oneida County		
Florence Hill	1	Oneida County		
Florida	1	Montgomery County		
Florida	1	Orange County	10921	
Floridaville	1	Cayuga County	13033	
Flowerfield Estates	1	Suffolk County	11755	
Flower Hill	1	Nassau County	11050	
Flowers	1	Broome County	13865	
Floyd	1	Oneida County	13440	
Floyd	1	Oneida County		
Flushing	1	Queens County	11301	99
Fluvanna	1	Chautauqua County	14701	
Fly Creek	1	Otsego County	13337	
Flying Point	1	Suffolk County	11976	
Fly Summit	1	Washington County	12834	
Folsomdale	1	Wyoming County	14037	
Fonda	1	Montgomery County	12068	
Footes	1	Erie County		
Foots Corners	1	Livingston County	14435	
Fordham	1	Bronx County	10458	
Fordsbush	1	Montgomery County		
Forest	1	Clinton County	12935	
Forest Beach	1	Onondaga County		
Forestburg	1	Sullivan County	12777	
Forestburgh	1	Sullivan County		
Forest City	1	Lewis County		
Forestdale	1	Franklin County		
Forest Glen	1	Erie County	10475	
Forest Glen	1	Ulster County		
Forest Hills	1	Queens County	11375	
Forest Home	1	Tompkins County	14850	
Forest Knolls	1	Westchester County	10804	
Forest Lawn	1	Monroe County	14880	
Forest Park	1	Chautauqua County	14787	
Forest Park	1	Queens County	11431	
Forestport	1	Oneida County	13338	
Forestport	1	Oneida County		
Forestport Station	1	Oneida County	13338	
Forestville	1	Chautauqua County	14062	
Forge Hollow	1	Oneida County	13328	
Forks	1	Erie County	14225	
Forsonville	1	Putnam County	10524	
Forsyth	1	Chautauqua County	14775	
Fort Ann	1	Washington County	12827	
Fort Ann	1	Washington County		
Fort Clinton	1	Rockland County		
Fort Covington	1	Franklin County	12937	
Fort Covington	1	Franklin County		
Fort Covington Center	1	Franklin County	12937	
Fort Drum	1	Jefferson County	13601	
Fort Edward	1	Washington County	12828	
Fort Edward	1	Washington County		
Fort George	1	New York County	10040	
Fort Greene	1	Kings County		
Fort Hamilton	1	Kings County	11252	
Fort Hamilton	1	Kings County	11209	
Fort Herkimer	1	Herkimer County	13407	
Fort Hill	1	Genesee County		
Fort Hill	1	Ontario County		
Fort Hill	1	Suffolk County	11743	
Fort Hill	1	Wayne County		
Fort Hunter	1	Albany County		
Fort Hunter	1	Montgomery County	12069	
Fort Jackson	1	St. Lawrence County	12938	
Fort Jay	1	New York County	10004	
Fort Johnson	1	Montgomery County	12070	
Fort Miller	1	Washington County	12828	
Fort Montgomery	1	Orange County	10922	
Fort Niagara Beach	1	Niagara County	14174	
Fort Ontario	1	Oswego County		
Fort Plain	1	Montgomery County	13339	
Fort Plain	1	Montgomery County		
Fort Putnam	1	Orange County		
Fort Salonga	1	Suffolk County	11768	
Fort Schuyler	1	Bronx County	10465	
Fort Stanwix National Monument	1	Oneida County	13440	
Fortsville	1	Saratoga County	12831	
Fort Ticonderoga	1	Essex County		
Fort Tilden	1	Queens County	11695	
Fort Totten	1	Queens County	11359	
Fort Wadsworth	1	Richmond County	10305	
Fort Washington	1	New York County	10032	
Fort William Henry	1	Warren County		
Foster	1	Tioga County	13827	
Fosterdale	1	Sullivan County	12726	
Fostertown	1	Orange County		
Fosterville	1	Cayuga County	13021	
Foster-Wheeler Junction	1	Livingston County	14437	
Four Mile	1	Cattaraugus County		
Fourth Lake	1	Warren County	12846	
Fowler	1	St. Lawrence County	13642	
Fowlersville	1	Lewis County	13433	
Fowlerville	1	Erie County	14025	
Fowlerville	1	Livingston County	14423	
Fowlerville	1	Sullivan County		
Fox	1	Cattaraugus County		
Fox Hill	1	Saratoga County	12134	
Fox Hills	1	Richmond County		
Fox Meadow	1	Westchester County		
Fox Ridge	1	Cayuga County		
Fraleighs	1	Dutchess County		
Francis Corners	1	Saratoga County		
Frankfort	1	Herkimer County	13340	
Frankfort	1	Herkimer County		
Frankfort Center	1	Herkimer County	13340	
Franklin	1	Delaware County	13775	
Franklin	1	Delaware County		
Franklin	1	Franklin County		
Franklin Depot	1	Delaware County	13839	
Franklin D. Roosevelt	1	New York County	10022	
Franklin Falls	1	Franklin County	12913	
Franklin Park	1	Onondaga County	13057	
Franklin Springs	1	Oneida County	13341	
Franklin Square	1	Nassau County	11010	
Franklinton	1	Schoharie County	12122	
Franklinville	1	Cattaraugus County	14737	
Franklinville	1	Cattaraugus County		
Franks Corner	1	Cortland County	13045	
Fraser	1	Delaware County	13753	
Fraser	1	Livingston County		
Frear Park	1	Rensselaer County		
Frederick Douglas	1	New York County		
Fredonia	1	Chautauqua County	14063	
Freedom	1	Cattaraugus County	14065	
Freedom	1	Cattaraugus County		
Freedom Plains	1	Dutchess County	12569	
Freehold	1	Greene County	12431	
Freeman	1	Steuben County	14801	
Freeman Mill	1	Lewis County		
Freeport	1	Nassau County	11520	
Freetown	1	Cortland County		
Freetown	1	Suffolk County	11937	
Freetown Corners	1	Cortland County	13803	
Freeville	1	Tompkins County	13068	
Fremont	1	Queens County		
Fremont	1	Steuben County		
Fremont	1	Sullivan County		
Fremont Center	1	Sullivan County	12736	
Fremont Hills	1	Onondaga County	13057	
French Creek	1	Chautauqua County		
French Creek	1	Chautauqua County		
French Mountain	1	Warren County		
Frenchville	1	Oneida County	13486	
French Woods	1	Delaware County	13783	
Fresh Kills	1	Richmond County		
Fresh Meadows	1	Queens County	11365	
Fresh Pond	1	Kings County	11385	
Fresh Pond	1	Queens County	11385	
Fresh Pond Junction	1	Queens County		
Frewsburg	1	Chautauqua County	14738	
Freysbush	1	Montgomery County		
Friend	1	Yates County	14527	
Friendship	1	Allegany County	14739	
Friendship	1	Allegany County		
Friends Point	1	Warren County	12836	
Frontenac	1	Jefferson County	13624	
Front Street	1	Broome County	13905	
Frost Hollow	1	Ontario County		
Frost Valley	1	Ulster County		
Fruitland	1	Wayne County	14519	
Fruit Valley	1	Oswego County	13126	
Fullers	1	Albany County		
Fullers	1	Warren County		
Fullerville	1	St. Lawrence County	13642	
Fulmer Valley	1	Allegany County	14806	
Fulton	1	Oswego County	13069	
Fulton	1	Schoharie County		
Fultonham	1	Schoharie County	12071	
Fulton Terminal	1	Kings County		
Fultonville	1	Montgomery County	12072	
Furnace Brook	1	Orange County	10925	
Furnaceville	1	Otsego County		
Furnaceville	1	Wayne County	14519	
Furnace Woods	1	Westchester County	10566	
Furniss	1	Oswego County	13126	
Fyler Settlement	1	Madison County	13082	
