= List of places in New York: G =

This list of current cities, towns, unincorporated communities, counties, and other recognized places in the U.S. state of New York also includes information on the number and names of counties in which the place lies, and its lower and upper zip code bounds, if applicable.

List of places in New York: A | B | C | D | E | F | G | H | I | J | K | L | M | N | O | P | Q | R | S | T | U | V | W | X | Y | Z

Name of place	Counties	Principal county	Lower zip code	Upper zip code
Gabriels	1	Franklin County	12939	
Gabriels Junction	1	Schuyler County		
Gage	1	Yates County		
Gaines	1	Orleans County	14411	
Gaines	1	Orleans County		
Gaines Basin	1	Orleans County		
Gainesville	1	Wyoming County	14066	
Gainesville	1	Wyoming County		
Galatia	1	Cortland County	13803	
Gale	1	St. Lawrence County	12973	
Galen	1	Wayne County		
Galena	1	Chenango County		
Galeville	1	Onondaga County	13088	
Galeville	1	Ulster County	12589	
Galilee	1	St. Lawrence County		
Gallatin	1	Columbia County	12567	
Gallatin	1	Columbia County		
Gallatinville	1	Columbia County		
Gallows Hill	1	Westchester County		
Gallupville	1	Schoharie County	12073	
Galway	1	Saratoga County	12074	
Galway	1	Saratoga County		
Galway Lake	1	Saratoga County	12025	
Gamble Mill	1	Onondaga County		
Ganahgote	1	Ulster County	12525	
Gang Mills	1	Steuben County	14870	
Gansevoort	1	Saratoga County	12831	
Garbutt	1	Monroe County	14546	
Garden City	1	Nassau County	11530	11535
Garden City Park	1	Nassau County	11040	
Garden City South	1	Nassau County	11530	
Garden Park Estates	1	Albany County	12203	
Garden Terrace	1	Onondaga County		
Gardenville	1	Erie County	14224	
Gardiner	1	Ulster County	12525	
Gardiners Bay Estates	1	Suffolk County	11939	
Gardiners Island	1	Suffolk County	11937	
Gardners Corners	1	Lewis County	13367	
Gardnersville	1	Schoharie County	12043	
Gardnertown	1	Orange County	12550	
Gardnertown	1	Orange County	12550	
Gardnerville	1	Orange County		
Garfield	1	Rensselaer County	12168	
Garland	1	Monroe County	14420	
Garlinghouse	1	Ontario County		
Garnerville	1	Rockland County	10923	
Garnet Lake	1	Warren County	12843	
Garoga	1	Fulton County	12095	
Garrattsville	1	Otsego County	13342	
Garrison	1	Putnam County	10524	
Garrison Manor	1	Saratoga County	12027	
Garwoods	1	Allegany County	14822	
Gaskill	1	Tioga County	13827	
Gasport	1	Niagara County	14067	
Gas Spring	1	Allegany County		
Gates	1	Monroe County		
Gates	1	Monroe County	14624	
Gates	1	Saratoga County		
Gates Center	1	Monroe County	14611	
Gates-North Gates	1	Monroe County		
Gateway National Recreation Area	3	Kings County	11234	
Gateway National Recreation Area	3	Queens County	11234	
Gateway National Recreation Area	3	Richmond County	11234	
Gayhead	1	Dutchess County	12533	
Gayhead	1	Greene County		
Gay Ridge Estates	1	Westchester County	10598	
Gayville	1	Oswego County	13044	
Geddes	1	Onondaga County		
Gedney	1	Westchester County	10605	
Gee Brook	1	Cortland County		
Geers Corners	1	St. Lawrence County	13648	
Genegantslet	1	Chenango County	13778	
General Grant National Memorial	1	New York County	10005	
Genesee	1	Allegany County		
Genesee And Wyoming Junction	1	Livingston County		
Genesee Falls	1	Wyoming County		
Genesee Junction	1	Monroe County		
Geneseo	1	Livingston County	14454	
Geneseo	1	Livingston County		
Geneva	2	Ontario County	14456	
Geneva	2	Seneca County	14456	
Geneva	1	Ontario County		
Genoa	1	Cayuga County	13071	
Genoa	1	Cayuga County		
Georgetown	1	Cortland County		
Georgetown	1	Madison County	13072	
Georgetown	1	Madison County		
Georgetown Square	1	Erie County	14221	
Georgica	1	Suffolk County		
Georgtown Station	1	Madison County	13334	
Gerard Park	1	Suffolk County		
German	1	Chenango County	13040	
German	1	Chenango County		
German Flatts	1	Herkimer County		
German Four Corners	1	Chenango County		
Germantown	1	Allegany County		
Germantown	1	Columbia County	12526	
Germantown	1	Columbia County	12525	
Germantown	1	Orange County	12771	
German Village	1	Monroe County	14617	
Germany Hill	1	Tioga County		
Germonds	1	Rockland County	10956	
Gerritsen	1	Kings County		
Gerry	1	Chautauqua County	14740	
Gerry	1	Chautauqua County		
Getman Corners	1	Herkimer County		
Getzville	1	Erie County	14068	
Ghent	1	Columbia County	12075	
Ghent	1	Columbia County		
Gibson	1	Nassau County	11581	
Gibson	1	Steuben County	14830	
Gibson Corners	1	Tioga County	13827	
Gibson Landing	1	Steuben County	14840	
Giddingsville	1	Jefferson County		
Gifford	1	Schenectady County	12056	
Gilbert	1	Seneca County		
Gilbert Corners	1	Putnam County		
Gilbert Corners	1	Saratoga County	12866	
Gilbert Corners	1	Schoharie County		
Gilbert Mills	1	Oswego County	13135	
Gilberts Corner	1	Niagara County		
Gilbertsville	1	Otsego County	13776	
Gilboa	1	Schoharie County	12076	
Gilboa	1	Schoharie County		
Gile	1	Franklin County		
Gilgo	1	Suffolk County		
Gilgo Beach	1	Suffolk County	11702	
Gilmantown	1	Hamilton County	12190	
Gimbels Number One	1	Nassau County	11581	
Girarde	1	Orange County		
Glasco	1	Ulster County	12432	
Glasgow Mills	1	Fulton County		
Glass Lake	1	Rensselaer County	12018	
Gleasons Mill	1	St. Lawrence County		
Glen	1	Montgomery County	12072	
Glen	1	Montgomery County		
Glen Aubrey	1	Broome County	13777	
Glenburnie	1	Washington County	12861	
Glencairn	1	Tioga County	14892	
Glen Castle	1	Broome County	13901	
Glenclyffe	1	Putnam County		
Glenco Mills	1	Columbia County	12534	
Glen Cove	1	Nassau County	11542	
Glendale	1	Kings County	11385	
Glendale	1	Lewis County	13343	
Glendale	1	Queens County	11385	
Glendale	1	Westchester County		
Glen Edith	1	Monroe County		
Glenerie	1	Ulster County	12477	
Glenerie Lake Park	1	Ulster County		
Glenfield	1	Lewis County	13343	
Glenford	1	Ulster County	12433	
Glen Grove	1	Steuben County		
Glenham	1	Dutchess County	12527	
Glen Haven	1	Cayuga County	13077	
Glen Haven	1	Monroe County	14617	
Glenhaven	1	Oneida County	13492	
Glen Head	1	Nassau County	11545	
Glen Island	1	Warren County	12814	
Glen Lake	1	Warren County	12801	
Glenmark	1	Wayne County	14516	
Glenmont	1	Albany County	12077	
Glenmore	1	Essex County		
Glenmore	1	Oneida County		
Glen Oaks	1	Queens County	11004	
Glenora	1	Yates County	14837	
Glen Park	1	Jefferson County	13601	
Glenridge	1	Schenectady County		
Glens Falls	1	Warren County	12801	
Glens Falls North	1	Warren County		
Glen Spey	1	Sullivan County	12737	
Glen Street	1	Nassau County	11579	
Glenville	1	Livingston County		
Glenville	1	Schenectady County	12325	
Glenville	1	Schenectady County		
Glenville	1	Westchester County	10591	
Glenville Center	1	Schenectady County		
Glenwild	1	Saratoga County		
Glen Wild	1	Sullivan County	12738	
Glenwood	1	Erie County	14069	
Glenwood	1	Niagara County		
Glenwood	1	Westchester County		
Glenwood Landing	1	Nassau County	11547	
Glenwood Park	1	Orange County		
Globe Hotel Corners	1	Cayuga County		
Gloversville	1	Fulton County	12078	
Godeffroy	1	Orange County	12739	
Golah	1	Monroe County		
Golden Glow Heights	1	Chemung County	14905	
Golden's Bridge	1	Westchester County	10526	
Goldsmith	1	Franklin County		
Goodrich	1	Tioga County		
Goodrich Corners	1	Oneida County		
Goodyear Corners	1	Cayuga County	13081	
Goose Bay	1	Jefferson County		
Goose Bay Estates	1	Suffolk County	11971	
Goose Island	1	Washington County		
Goosetree	1	Cayuga County		
Gordon Heights	1	Suffolk County	11727	
Gorham	1	Ontario County	14461	
Gorham	1	Ontario County		
Gorthey Corners	1	Fulton County		
Goshen (town)	1	Orange County	10924	
Goshen (town)	1	Orange County		
Goshen (village)	1	Orange County	10924	
Goshen (village)	1	Orange County		
Goshen Hills	1	Orange County	10924	
Gothicville	1	Otsego County	12197	
Goulds	1	Delaware County		
Goulds Mill	1	Lewis County	13368	
Gouverneur	1	St. Lawrence County	13642	
Gouverneur	1	St. Lawrence County		
Governors Island	1	New York County	10004	
Gowanda	2	Cattaraugus County	14070	
Gowanda	2	Erie County	14070	
Gowanda State Homeopathic Hospital	1	Erie County		
G P O	1	New York County	10001	
Gracie	1	Cortland County		
Gracie	1	New York County	10028	
Grafton	1	Rensselaer County	12082	
Grafton	1	Rensselaer County		
Graftons Square	1	Oswego County		
Graham	1	Westchester County		
Graham Beach	1	Richmond County	10305	
Grahamsville	1	Sullivan County	12740	
Granby	1	Oswego County		
Granby Center	1	Oswego County	13069	
Grand Central	1	New York County	10017	
Grand Central Terminal	1	New York County		
Grand Gorge	1	Delaware County	12434	
Grand Hotel	1	Ulster County		
Grand Island	1	Erie County	14072	
Grand Island	1	Erie County		
Grand Station	1	Queens County	11103	
Grandview	1	Genesee County		
Grandview Bay	1	Erie County	14006	
Grand View Beach	1	Monroe County		
Grand View Heights	1	Monroe County	14612	
Grand View-on-Hudson	1	Rockland County	10960	
Grandview Park	1	Jefferson County	13692	
Grandyle Village	1	Erie County	14072	
Grange Landing	1	Ontario County		
Granger	1	Allegany County		
Grangerville	1	Saratoga County	12871	
Granite	1	Ulster County	12446	
Granite Springs	1	Westchester County	10527	
Graniteville	1	Richmond County	10301	
Grant	1	Herkimer County	13324	
Grant Avenue	1	Cayuga County	13021	
Grant Corner	1	Westchester County		
Grant Hollow	1	Rensselaer County	12121	
Grant Mills	1	Delaware County		
Grant Park	1	Nassau County	11557	
Grantville	1	St. Lawrence County	13667	
Granville	1	Washington County	12832	
Granville	1	Washington County		
Grapeville	1	Greene County	12042	
Graphite	1	Warren County	12836	
Grasmere	1	Richmond County		
Grassy Point	1	Rockland County	10980	
Gravesend	1	Kings County	11223	
Gravesville	1	Herkimer County	13431	
Gray	1	Herkimer County	13324	
Graymoor	1	Putnam County		
Gray Oaks	1	Westchester County		
Grays Corners	1	Saratoga County		
Gray Shores	1	Livingston County		
Graywood	1	Livingston County		
Great Bend	1	Jefferson County	13643	
Great Bend Bomb Scoring Site	1	Jefferson County	13463	
Greater Buffalo International Airport	1	Erie County	14225	
Great Kills	1	Richmond County	10308	
Great Meadows Correctional Institution	1	Washington County		
Great Neck	1	Nassau County	11020	11027
Great Neck Estates	1	Nassau County	11021	
Great Neck Gardens	1	Nassau County		
Great Neck Plaza	1	Nassau County	11020	
Great River	1	Suffolk County	11730	
Great River	1	Suffolk County	11739	
Great Valley	1	Cattaraugus County	14741	
Greece	1	Monroe County	14616	
Greeley Square	1	New York County	10001	
Green Acres	1	Erie County	14150	
Green Acres	1	Nassau County	11581	
Green Acres Valley	1	Erie County		
Greenboro	1	Oswego County		
Greenburgh	1	Westchester County		
Greenbush	1	Schoharie County		
Green Corners	1	Schenectady County	12010	
Greencrest	1	Chautauqua County	14063	
Greendale	1	Columbia County	12534	
Greene	1	Chenango County	13778	
Greene	1	Chenango County		
Greenfield	1	Saratoga County		
Greenfield Center	1	Saratoga County	12833	
Greenfield Park	1	Ulster County	12435	
Green Haven	1	Dutchess County	12570	
Greenhaven	1	Westchester County	10580	
Green Hills	1	Chautauqua County		
Greenhurst	1	Chautauqua County	14742	
Green Island	1	Albany County	12183	
Green Island	1	Albany County		
Greenlawn	1	Suffolk County	11740	
Greenpoint	1	Kings County	11222	
Greenport	1	Columbia County		
Greenport	1	Suffolk County	11944	
Greenport Center	1	Columbia County		
Greenport West	1	Suffolk County		
Greenridge	1	Richmond County		
Green River	1	Columbia County	12529	
Green Settlement	1	Jefferson County		
Greens Landing	1	Ontario County		
Green Street	1	Essex County		
Greenvale	1	Nassau County	11548	
Greenville	1	Greene County	12083	
Greenville	1	Greene County		
Greenville	1	Orange County		
Greenville	1	Steuben County		
Greenville	1	Ulster County		
Greenville	1	Westchester County	10583	
Greenville Center	1	Greene County	12083	
Greenway	1	Oneida County	13440	
Greenway Corners	1	Oneida County		
Greenwich	1	Washington County	12834	
Greenwich	1	Washington County		
Greenwich Junction	1	Washington County		
Greenwich Village	1	New York County		
Greenwood	1	Kings County		
Greenwood	1	Steuben County	14839	
Greenwood	1	Steuben County		
Greenwood Lake	1	Orange County	10925	
Greer Children's Home	1	Dutchess County		
Gregorytown	1	Delaware County	13755	
Greig	1	Lewis County	13345	
Greig	1	Lewis County		
Greigsville	1	Livingston County	14533	
Greigsville	1	Livingston County		
Grenell	1	Jefferson County	13624	
Gretna	1	Dutchess County		
Greycourt	1	Orange County	10918	
Grey Oaks	1	Westchester County		
Greystone	1	Westchester County		
Gridleyville	1	Tioga County	13864	
Griffin	1	Hamilton County		
Griffins Corners	1	Onondaga County		
Griffins Mills	1	Erie County	14170	
Griffiss Air Force Base	1	Oneida County	13441	
Griffiths	1	Chautauqua County		
Grindstone	1	Jefferson County	13624	
Griswold	1	Chautauqua County		
Griswold	1	Genesee County		
Groom Corners	1	Saratoga County	12008	
Grooville	1	Sullivan County	12758	
Grossinger	1	Sullivan County	12734	
Groton	1	Tompkins County	13073	
Groton	1	Tompkins County		
Groton City	1	Tompkins County	13073	
Grotto	1	Tompkins County		
Grout Mill	1	Cortland County		
Grove	1	Allegany County		
Groveland	1	Livingston County	14462	
Groveland	1	Livingston County		
Groveland Corners	1	Livingston County		
Grovenor Corners	1	Schoharie County		
Grover	1	Erie County	14226	
Grover Cleveland Terrace	1	Erie County		
Grover Hills	1	Essex County	12956	
Grovernor Corners	1	Schoharie County	12035	
Grove Springs	1	Steuben County		
Groveville	1	Dutchess County	12508	
Grumman	1	Nassau County		
Grymes Hill	1	Richmond County	10301	
Guideboard	1	Madison County		
Guide Board Corners	1	Tompkins County		
Guilderland	1	Albany County	12084	
Guilderland	1	Albany County		
Guilderland Center	1	Albany County	12085	
Guilderland Gardens	1	Albany County	12203	
Guilford	1	Chenango County	13780	
Guilford	1	Chenango County		
Guilford Center	1	Chenango County	13780	
Gulf Bridge	1	Oswego County		
Gulfport	1	Richmond County		
Gulf Summit	1	Broome County	13865	
Gulick	1	Ontario County		
Gulph	1	Herkimer County		
Gunther Park	1	Westchester County		
Gurn Spring	1	Saratoga County	12831	
Guyanoga	1	Yates County	14418	
Guyler Hill	1	Cortland County		
Guymard	1	Orange County	12739	
Gypsum	1	Ontario County	14432	
