= Lycoming =

Lycoming may refer to the following, most of which are at least partly in Lycoming County, Pennsylvania, United States:

== Geography ==
- Lycoming, New York, a hamlet
- Lycoming County, Pennsylvania
- Lycoming Township, Pennsylvania
- Lycoming Creek, a tributary of the West Branch Susquehanna River

== Other uses ==
- Lycoming Engines, a manufacturer of aircraft engines, and its successor Textron Lycoming
- Lycoming Mall, a shopping mall of Interstate 180
- Lycoming College, a small, private, liberal arts college in Williamsport, Pennsylvania
- USS Lycoming (APA-155), a World War II attack transport

== See also ==
- Old Lycoming Township, Pennsylvania
- Lycoming Valley Railroad, a shortline railroad along the West Branch Susquehanna River
