= Farmers Mills, New York =

Farmers Mills, New York may refer to:

- Farmers Mills, Oneida County, New York, a hamlet in the town of Kirkland
- Farmers Mills, Putnam County, New York
