= Beartown, New York =

- Hamlet
- Location within New York Location within the United States
- Coordinates: 43°21′03″N 75°27′15″W
- Country: United States
- State: New York
- County: Oneida
- Town: Western
- Elevation: 1,260 ft (384 m)
- Time zone: UTC-5 (Eastern (EST))
  - Summer (DST): UTC-4 (EDT)
- ZIP code: 13303
- Area code: 315

Beartown is a hamlet located on Beartown Road in the Town of Western in Oneida County, New York.
