= Selkirk Shores State Park =

State park in New York, United States

- Location within New York
- Type: State park
- Location: 7101 State Route #3; Pulaski, New York
- Nearest city: Pulaski, New York
- Coordinates: 43°33′29″N 76°11′46″W
- Area: 980 acres (4.0 km^{2})
- Operator: New York State Office of Parks, Recreation and Historic Preservation
- Visitors: 77,930 (in 2014)
- Open: All year
- Website: Selkirk Shores State Park

Selkirk Shores State Park is a 980-acre (4.0 km^{2}) state park located in the Town of Richland in Oswego County, New York. The park is located on the eastern shore of Lake Ontario.

== Park description ==
Selkirk Shores State Park features a swimming beach on Lake Ontario, hiking trails, campsites and cabins. The park is associated with the nearby Pine Grove Boat Launch, which provides access for small boats to the lower Salmon River.

A "Bird Conservation Area" at the park protects breeding habitat for several regionally threatened bird species, including pied-billed grebes, American bitterns, least bitterns, and black terns.

== See also ==
- List of New York state parks
