= Chippewa Bay, New York =

- Hamlet
- Location within New York Location within the United States
- Coordinates: 44°26′31″N 75°45′25″W
- Country: United States
- State: New York
- County: St. Lawrence
- Elevation: 289 ft (88 m)
- Time zone: UTC-5 (Eastern (EST))
  - Summer (DST): UTC-4 (EDT)
- ZIP code: 13623
- Area codes: 315 & 680
- GNIS feature ID: 976131

Chippewa Bay is a hamlet in St. Lawrence County, New York, United States. The community is located along the Saint Lawrence River and New York State Route 12, 3.1 miles (5.0 km) west of Hammond. Chippewa Bay has a post office with ZIP code 13623, which opened on August 3, 1880. In Season 6 Episode 18 (4/30/2002) of the TV show Buffy the Vampire Slayer titled 'Entropy', the character Willow is wearing a 'Chippewa Bay New York' T-shirt
