= Mallory, New York =

- Hamlet
- Location within New York Location within the United States
- Coordinates: 43°19′25″N 76°07′00″W
- Country: United States
- State: New York
- County: Oswego
- Elevation: 413 ft (126 m)
- Time zone: UTC-5 (Eastern (EST))
  - Summer (DST): UTC-4 (EDT)
- ZIP code: 13103
- Area codes: 315 & 680
- GNIS feature ID: 956304

Mallory is a hamlet in Oswego County, New York, United States. The community is 3 miles (4.8 km) north-northeast of Central Square. Mallory has a post office with ZIP code 13103.
