= J. E. Ashworth & Sons =

- Industry: Manufacturing

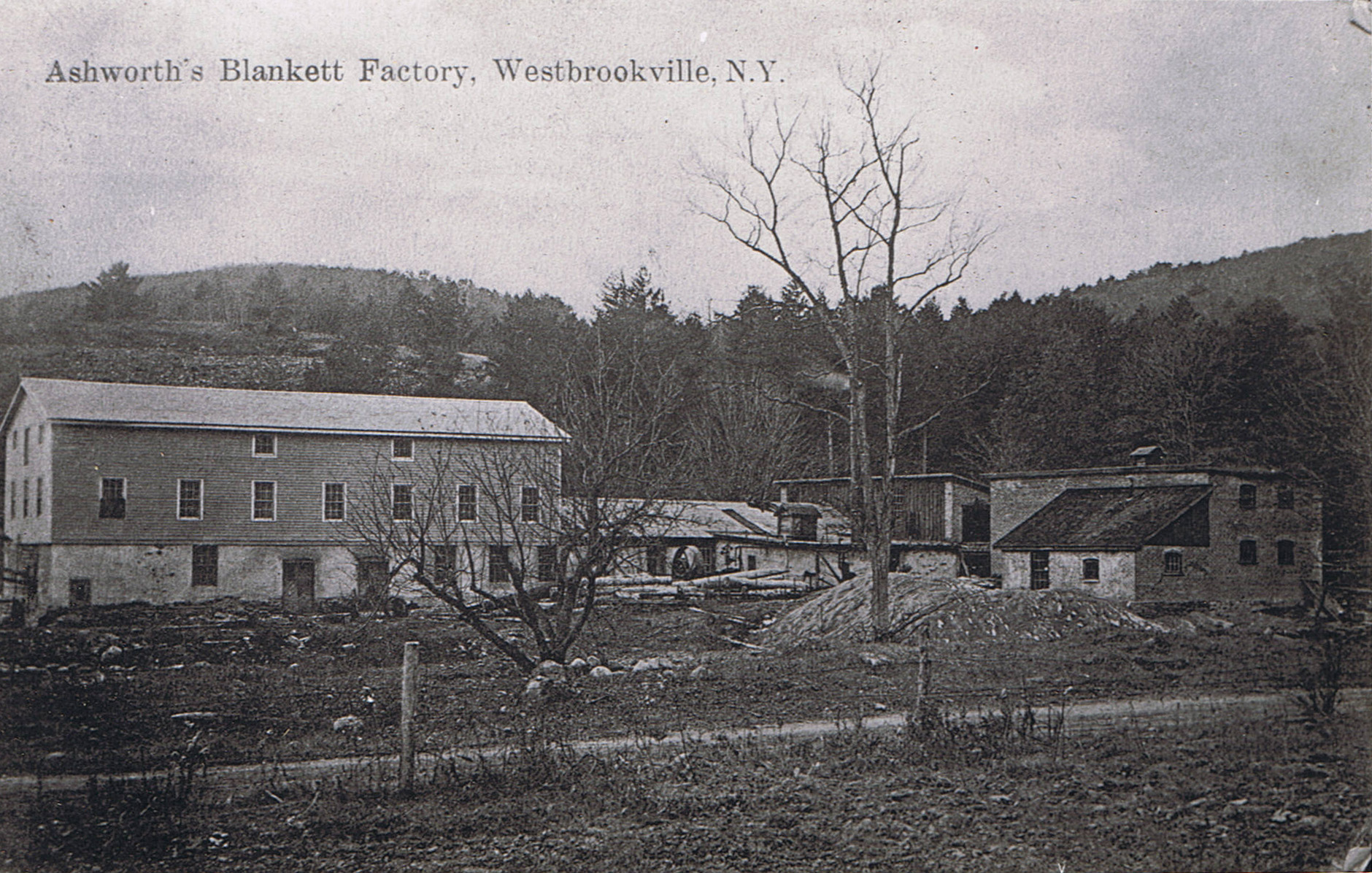
Ashworth's blanket factory

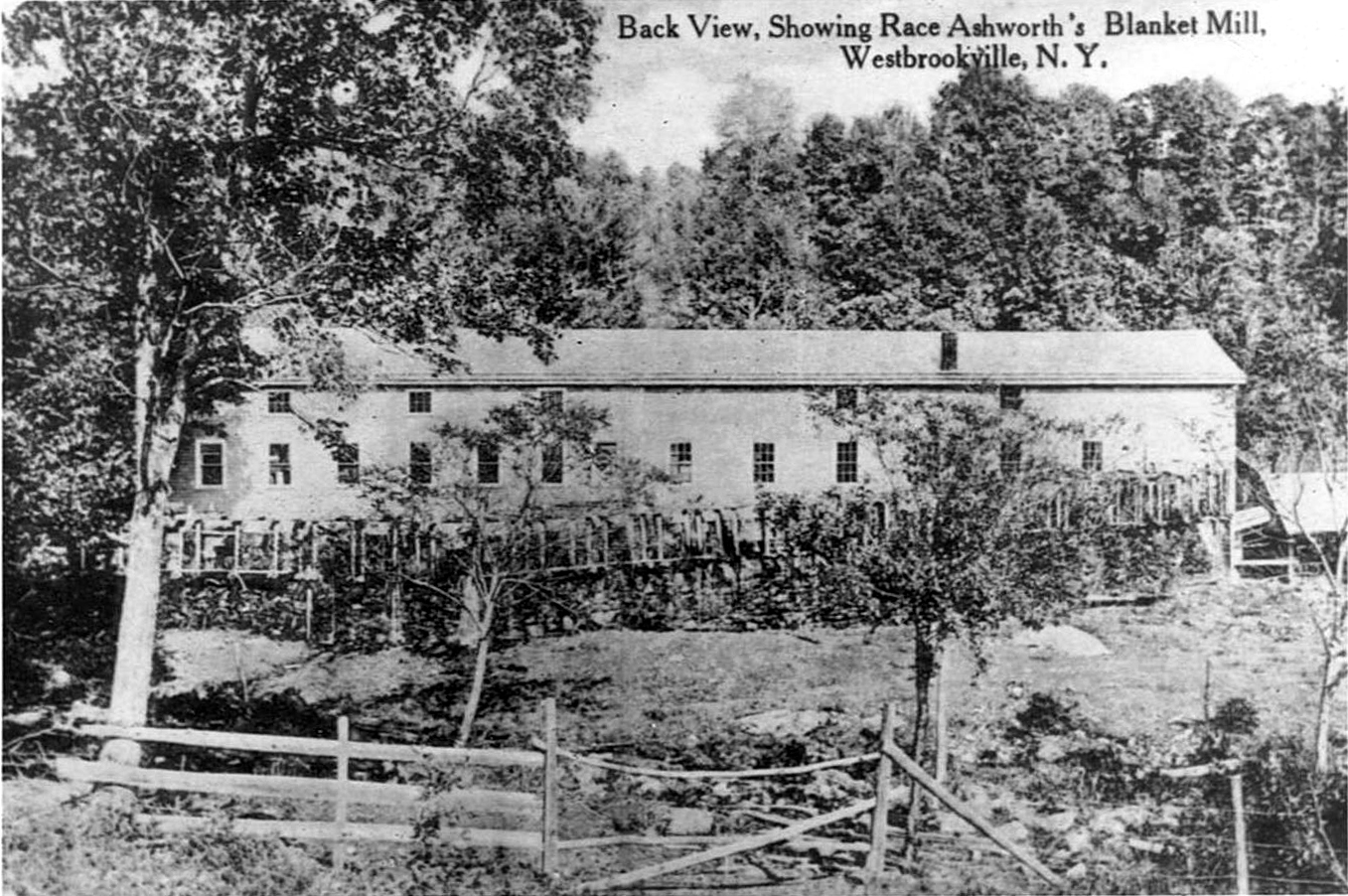
Back view of mill, showing millrace

J. E. Ashworth & Sons was a company that operated blanket mills in Hartland, Vermont, Westbrookville, New York, and Whippany, New Jersey. They manufactured United States Army blankets, horse blankets, and bed blankets. They also performed custom wool carding.

== History ==
It was established by James Edward Ashworth (1831–1910) and his two sons, Albert P. Ashworth (1872–1934) and Daniel Gunner Ashworth (1876–1949). In 1880 James was working at a mill in Greenwich, New York, and learning the trade. By 1883–1884 he was operating a mill in Hartland, Vermont, where he was listed as a "manufacturer and wholesale dealer in heavy Army and horse blankets, bed blankets, and custom wool carding". The Vermont blanket factory, was originally the Sturtevant woolen-mills, it was operated by water-power, had five looms, it employed twelve men and made 10,000 blankets per year. J. E. Ashworth & Sons had a "reputation of turning out some of the finest blankets in the country." United States Trade Reports of Cincinnati, Ohio, wrote on December 16, 1904: "The products of this establishment not only equal those offered by any other manufacturer, but in points of workmanship and finish cannot be surpassed, and no house in the country is more fully equipped to meet modern demands in this line. They are firm believers in quality and zealously guard the quality of their products at all times by using only the best materials and employing experienced workmen." Their fawn colored horse blankets were used by the Wells Fargo, American Express and Adams Express Company companies, and the Standard Oil and Atlantic Petroleum companies. The Westbrookville, New York, mill burned down and was rebuilt, but closed permanently in 1961.
