= Ramona Beach, New York =

Place in Oswego County, New York, US

Coordinates: 43°32′24″N 76°13′18″W

Ramona Beach is a community in Richland, New York, United States, located on the shore of Lake Ontario.

The winters in Ramona Beach are notoriously cold and high in lake effect precipitation, as are the whole area of the eastern shore of Lake Ontario. In 2019, a residence dubbed the "ice house" went viral for being covered in the ice and snow whipped up by the winter winds. The owners and neighbors thought that "Lake Ontario's high water levels may have played a role in their so-called 'ice houses'. Lake levels are running about a foot higher than average for this time of year, according to NOAA's Great Lakes Environmental Research Laboratory." The Weather Channel ranked it 6th of "10 Strangest Weather Events We've Seen in 2019 So Far".
