= Webbs Mills, New York =

District of Chemung County in the state of New York

Coordinates: 42.025°N 76.882°W

Webbs Mills or Webb Mills is a district of Chemung County in the state of New York. It is named after the Webb family who operated mills there. Mills were first constructed on Seeley Creek by Hezekiah Dunham in 1835. The property was then bought by Festus Webb and the Webb family expanded and improved the mills from the original two runs. Henry Marvin lived there in the 19th century and kept a diary which has been preserved and published — The Plank Road Explorer. The Plank Road was a toll road from Elmira to the state line with Pennsylvania which was surfaced with wooden planks. Henry was the great-grand-uncle of the actor Lee Marvin.
