= Westbrookville, New York =

- Hamlet
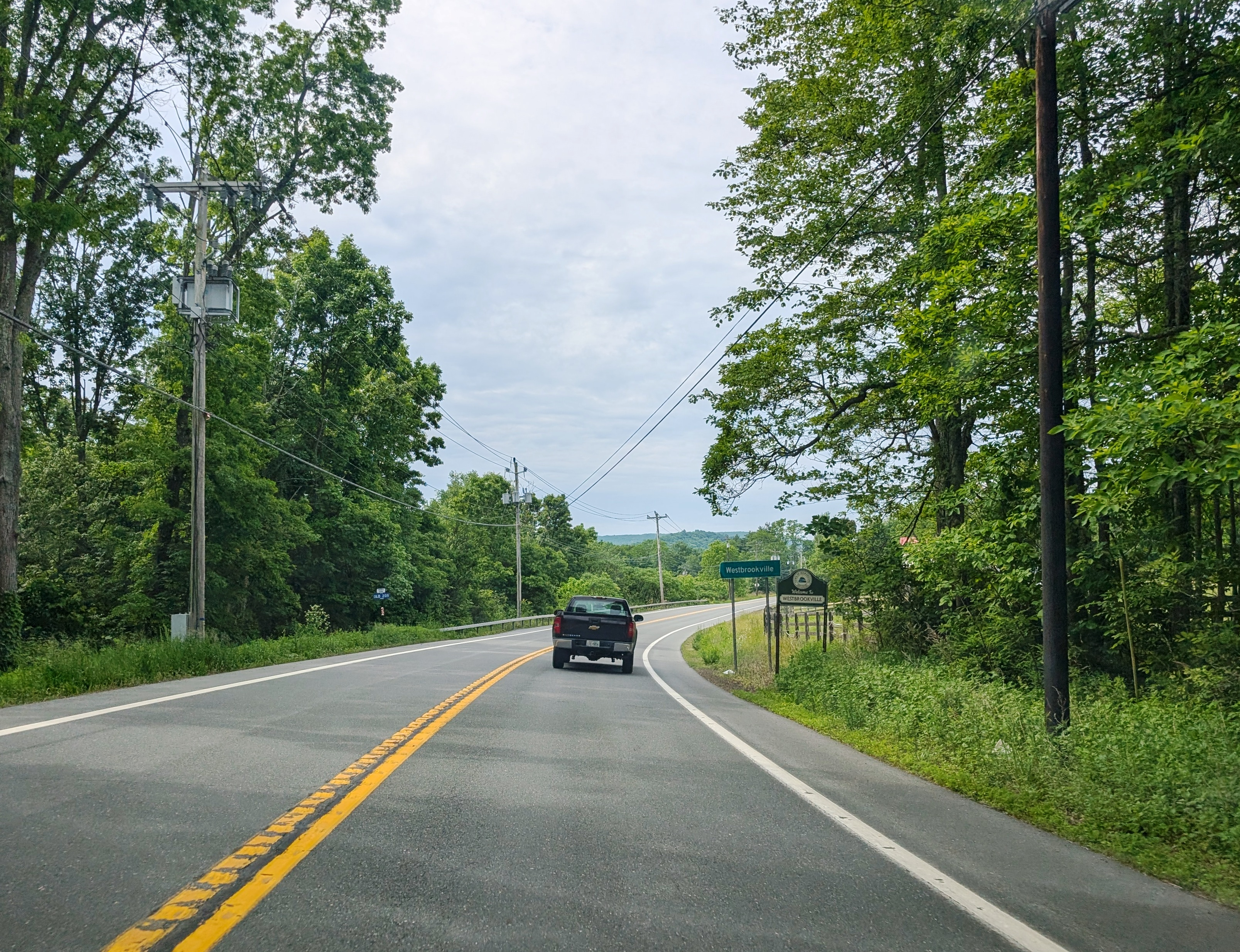
- US 209 southbound entering Westbrookville

- Location within the state of New York
- Coordinates: 41°30′N 74°33′W
- Country: United States
- State: New York
- County: Sullivan and Orange County, New York
- Elevation: 506 ft (154 m)
- Time zone: UTC-5 (Eastern (EST))
  - Summer (DST): UTC-4 (EDT)
- ZIP code: 12785
- GNIS feature ID: 970894

Westbrookville is a hamlet in the town of Deerpark in Orange County, New York, United States, along US 209. Westbrookville was named for Dirck Van Keuren Westbrook, an early settler. Fort Westbrook, dating back to the American Revolution, is extant. The 1900–1940 US Census lists it as part of Mamakating in Sullivan County. Situated between Port Jervis and Wurtsboro, it is close to the borders of Pennsylvania and New Jersey. Westbrookville is located within the Port Jervis City School District. It contains many small businesses and Westbrookville Cemetery.

The hamlet once housed the J. E. Ashworth & Sons blanket mill.

According to the Census Bureau, New York's center of population is located three miles away from Westbrookville in the hamlet to its south, Cuddebackville.

== Notable people ==
Karl A. Brabenec – New York State Assemblyman, 98th District (2014–present)

== Images ==
Pinekill Falls

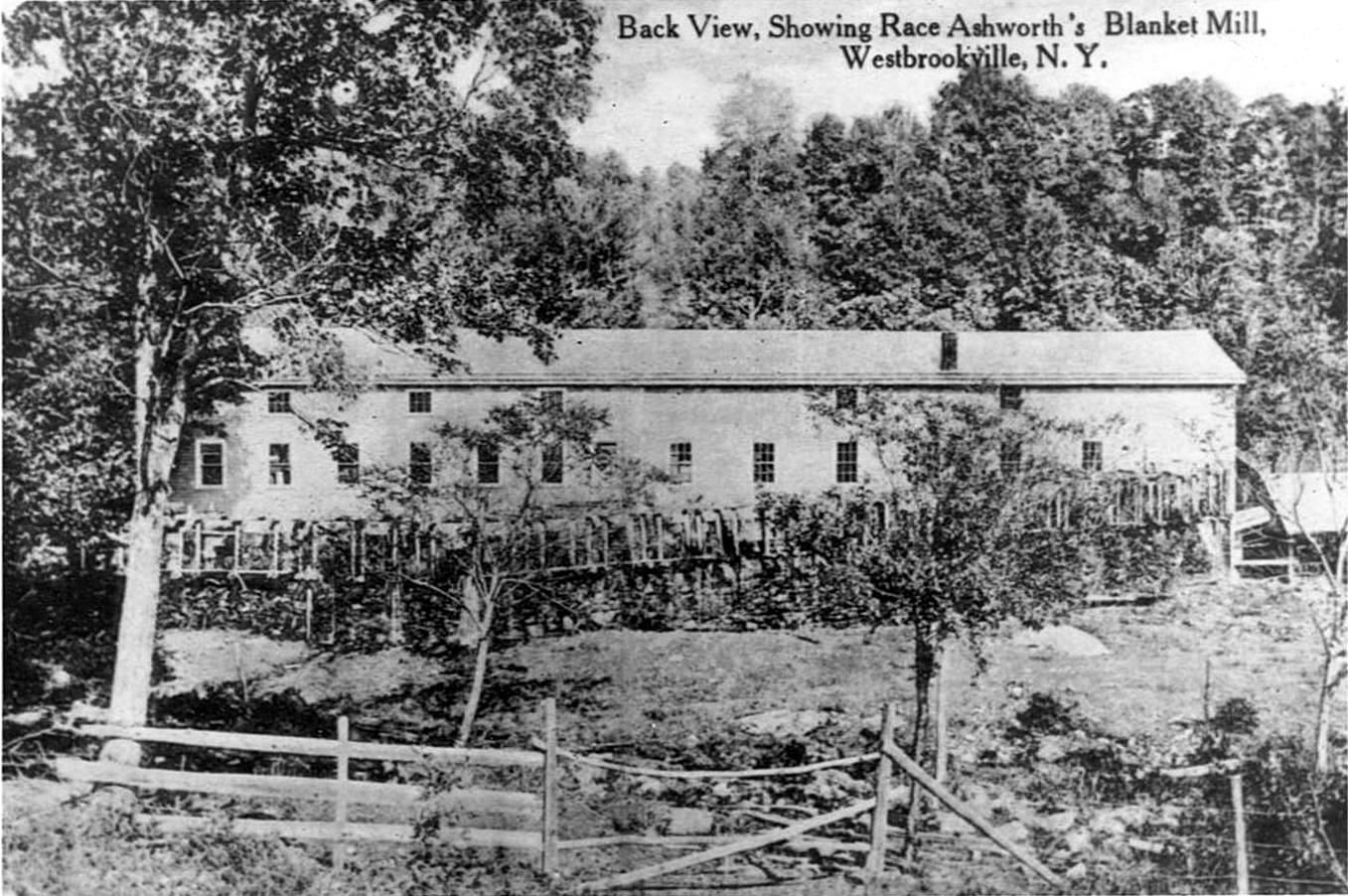
Ashworth's Blanket Mill, showing millrace in rear

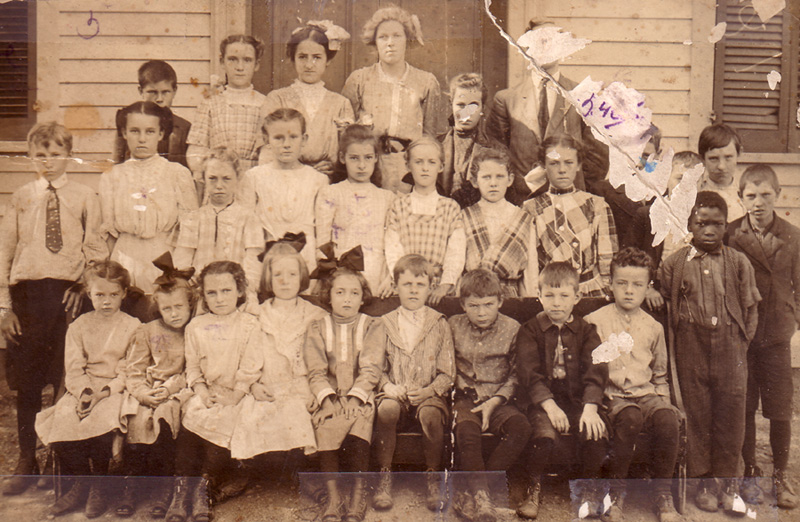
Westbrookville school circa 1908–1910
