= Green Acres Valley, New York =

Hamlet in New York, United States

Coordinates: 43°00′26″N 78°49′53″W

Green Acres Valley, also known as Green Acres, is a hamlet in the town of Tonawanda in Erie County, New York, United States.
