= Grant Hollow, New York =

Coordinates: 42°49′56″N 73°37′32″W

Grant Hollow is a hamlet in Rensselaer County, in the U.S. state of New York.

The community took its name from the Grant-Ferris Company, manufacturers of agricultural equipment. The name is sometimes spelled with the apostrophe, "Grant's Hollow".
