= Whippleville, New York =

- Hamlet
- Location within New York Location within the United States
- Coordinates: 44°48′35″N 74°15′43″W
- Country: United States
- State: New York
- County: Franklin
- Elevation: 823 ft (251 m)
- Time zone: UTC-5 (Eastern (EST))
  - Summer (DST): UTC-4 (EDT)
- ZIP code: 12995
- Area codes: 518 & 838
- GNIS feature ID: 971045

Whippleville is a hamlet in Franklin County, New York, United States. The community is 3.1 miles (5.0 km) south-southeast of Malone. Whippleville had a post office from May 26, 1887, until October 14, 1989; it still has its own ZIP code, 12995.
