= Bellona, New York =

- Hamlet
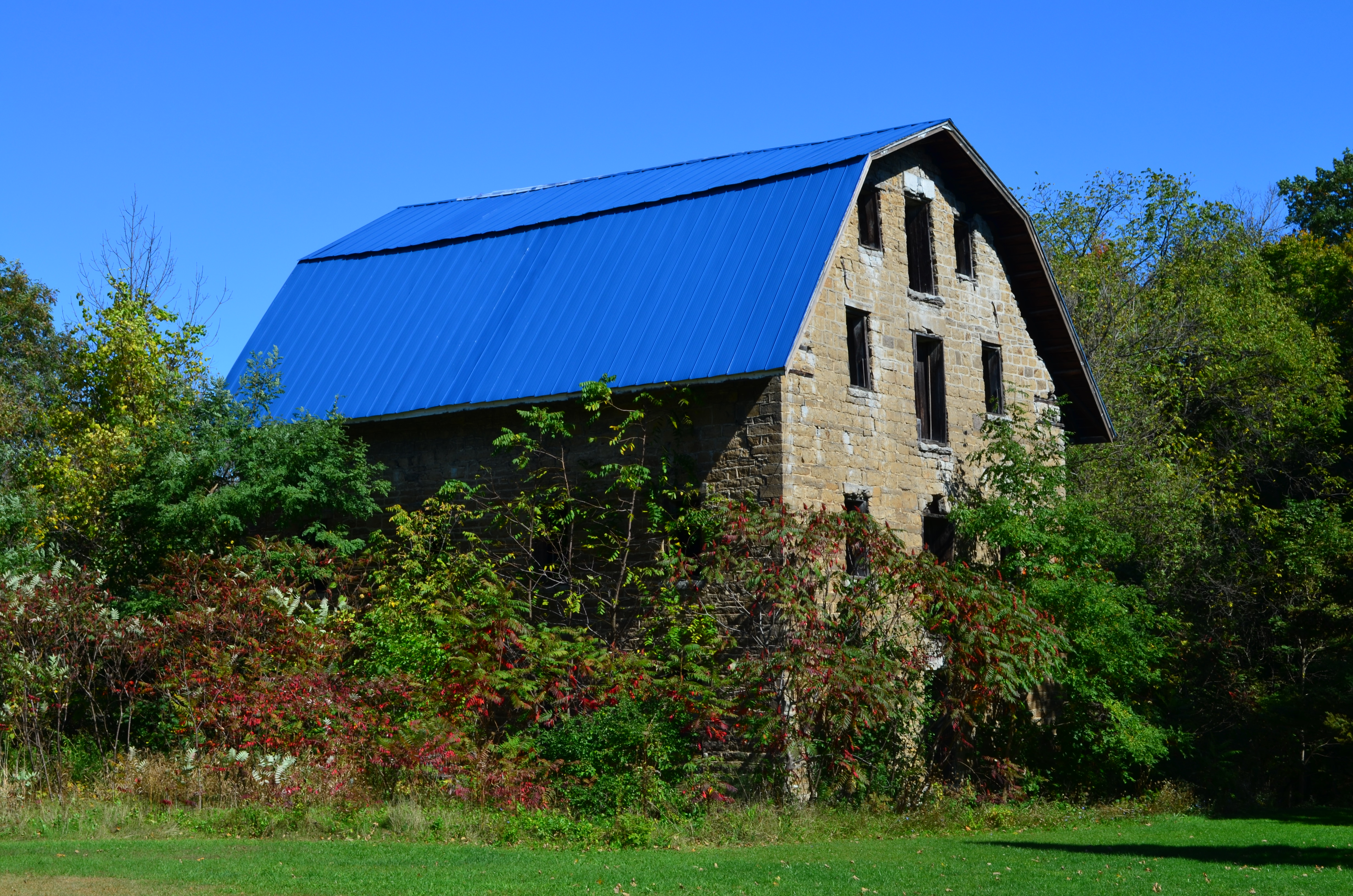
- Stone barn of a former mill

- Location within New York Location within the United States
- Coordinates: 42°45′25″N 77°00′53″W
- Country: United States
- State: New York
- County: Yates
- Elevation: 725 ft (221 m)
- Time zone: UTC-5 (Eastern (EST))
  - Summer (DST): UTC-4 (EDT)
- ZIP code: 14415
- Area code: 585
- GNIS feature ID: 943621

Bellona is a hamlet in Yates County, New York, United States. The community is 6.9 miles (11.1 km) north-northeast of Penn Yan. Bellona has a post office with ZIP code 14415, which opened on May 14, 1816.
