= Reading Center, New York =

- Hamlet
- Location within New York Location within the United States
- Coordinates: 42°25′49″N 76°55′58″W
- Country: United States
- State: New York
- County: Schuyler
- Elevation: 1,247 ft (380 m)
- Time zone: UTC-5 (Eastern (EST))
  - Summer (DST): UTC-4 (EDT)
- ZIP code: 14876
- Area code: 607
- GNIS feature ID: 974164

Reading Center is a section of Reading, New York, a town in Schuyler County, New York, United States. The community is located along New York State Route 14A, 4.6 miles (7.4 km) northwest of Watkins Glen. Reading Center has a post office with ZIP code 14876, which opened on February 19, 1844.
