= West Stockholm, New York =

- Hamlet
- Location within New York Location within the United States
- Coordinates: 44°42′49″N 74°54′03″W
- Country: United States
- State: New York
- County: St. Lawrence
- Elevation: 384 ft (117 m)
- Time zone: UTC-5 (Eastern (EST))
  - Summer (DST): UTC-4 (EDT)
- ZIP code: 13696
- Area codes: 315 & 680
- GNIS feature ID: 977260

West Stockholm is a hamlet in St. Lawrence County, New York, United States. The community is located along the St. Regis River and U.S. Route 11, 5 miles (8.0 km) northeast of Potsdam. West Stockholm has a post office with ZIP code 13696, which opened on March 25, 1825.
