= Richland, New York =

- Town
- Location in Oswego County and the state of New York.
- Coordinates: 43°32′53″N 76°8′7″W
- Country: United States
- State: New York
- County: Oswego

Government
  - Town Supervisor: Robert North

Area
  - Total: 60.05 sq mi (155.53 km^{2})
  - Land: 57.25 sq mi (148.27 km^{2})
  - Water: 2.80 sq mi (7.25 km^{2})
- Elevation: 387 ft (118 m)

Population (2010)
  - Total: 5,718
  - Estimate (2016): 5,606
  - Density: 97.9/sq mi (37.81/km^{2})
- Time zone: UTC-5 (Eastern (EST))
  - Summer (DST): UTC-4 (EDT)
- ZIP code: 13144
- Area code: 315
- FIPS code: 36-61533
- GNIS feature ID: 0979419
- Website: Town website

Richland is a town in the northeastern part of Oswego County, New York, United States. The population was 5,718 at the 2010 census.

== History ==
The town was first settled circa 1801. The town of Richland was formed from part of the town of Williamstown, New York in 1807.

== Geography ==
According to the United States Census Bureau, the town has a total area of 60.1 square miles (156 km^{2}), of which 57.2 square miles (148 km^{2}) is land and 2.9 square miles (7.5 km^{2}) (4.86%) is water.

The western border of the town is Lake Ontario.

== Demographics ==
Historical population
Census	Pop.	Note	%±
1820	488		—
1830	2,733		460.0%
1840	4,050		48.2%
1850	4,079		0.7%
1860	4,128		1.2%
1870	3,975		−3.7%
1880	3,991		0.4%
1890	3,771		−5.5%
1900	3,535		−6.3%
1910	3,791		7.2%
1920	3,738		−1.4%
1930	3,816		2.1%
1940	3,848		0.8%
1950	4,067		5.7%
1960	4,554		12.0%
1970	5,324		16.9%
1980	5,594		5.1%
1990	5,917		5.8%
2000	5,824		−1.6%
2010	5,718		−1.8%
2016 (est.)	5,606		−2.0%
U.S. Decennial Census

As of the census of 2000, there were 5,824 people, 2,257 households, and 1,543 families residing in the town. The population density was 101.9 inhabitants per square mile (39.3/km^{2}). There were 2,890 housing units at an average density of 50.5 per square mile (19.5/km^{2}). The racial makeup of the town was 98.15% White, 0.19% African American, 0.33% Native American, 0.39% Asian, 0.12% from other races, and 0.82% from two or more races. Hispanic or Latino of any race were 0.65% of the population.

There were 2,257 households, out of which 34.4% had children under the age of 18 living with them, 53.2% were married couples living together, 10.5% had a female householder with no husband present, and 31.6% were non-families. 26.1% of all households were made up of individuals, and 12.9% had someone living alone who was 65 years of age or older. The average household size was 2.57 and the average family size was 3.10.

In the town, the population was spread out, with 27.7% under the age of 18, 7.0% from 18 to 24, 28.9% from 25 to 44, 23.2% from 45 to 64, and 13.2% who were 65 years of age or older. The median age was 36 years. For every 100 females, there were 97.6 males. For every 100 females age 18 and over, there were 94.8 males.

The median income for a household in the town was $36,410, and the median income for a family was $43,564. Males had a median income of $36,035 versus $22,337 for females. The per capita income for the town was $16,780. About 9.6% of families and 13.4% of the population were below the poverty line, including 16.6% of those under age 18 and 13.8% of those age 65 or over.

== Communities and locations in Richland ==
- Bethel Corners – hamlet on NY 3 on the north side of the Salmon River
- Daysville – hamlet in southwest part of town
- Daysville Corner – location on NY 3 south of Selkirk Shores State Park
- Farmers Corner – hamlet on US 11 south of Pulaski
- Fernwood – hamlet in southern part of town
- Malby Corners – hamlet north of Pulaski
- Port Ontario – hamlet on the south side of the Salmon River along NY 3
- Pulaski – the village of Pulaski
- Ramona Beach – a community on the shore of Lake Ontario
- Richland – namesake hamlet in the east part of town
- Selkirk – hamlet on the shore of Lake Ontario; site of the Selkirk Light
- Selkirk Shores State Park – a state park on the shore of Lake Ontario south of Selkirk
- Tinker Tavern Corner – location along US 11 in southern part of town
- Tylers Corner – location in south-central part of town
