= Border City, New York =

Hamlet in New York, United States

Coordinates: 42°52′43″N 76°57′38″W

Border City is a hamlet on the border of the City of Geneva in Ontario County and the Town of Waterloo in Seneca County, New York, United States, near Seneca Lake. It dates back to 1788 when the Pre-Emption Line was drawn from the Pennsylvania border to Lake Ontario, thus creating Upstate New York. The "Border" referred to is the former Massachusetts and New York border. It is when Phelps & Gorham secured the purchase of 6+ million acres from the Commonwealth of Massachusetts that the State of New York that we now know was created. It is located just east of Geneva, at an elevation of 463 feet (141 m). The primary cross roads where the hamlet is located are East North Street (CR 4), Border City Road (CR 110) and Pre-Emption Street. U.S. Route 20 and N.Y. Route 5 (Known locally as Route 5 and 20) passes just south of Border City.

Seneca Lake State Park is located just south of the hamlet.
