= Brier Hill, New York =

- Hamlet
- Location within New York Location within the United States
- Coordinates: 44°31′53″N 75°39′46″W
- Country: United States
- State: New York
- County: St. Lawrence
- Elevation: 341 ft (104 m)
- Time zone: UTC-5 (Eastern (EST))
  - Summer (DST): UTC-4 (EDT)
- ZIP code: 13614
- Area codes: 315 & 680
- GNIS feature ID: 976026

Brier Hill is a hamlet in St. Lawrence County, New York, United States. The community is located along New York State Route 37, 3.9 miles (6.3 km) south of Morristown. Brier Hill has a post office with ZIP code 13614.
