= Bernhards Bay, New York =

- Hamlet
- Location within New York Location within the United States
- Coordinates: 43°14′40″N 75°56′01″W
- Country: United States
- State: New York
- County: Oswego
- Elevation: 390 ft (120 m)
- Time zone: UTC-5 (Eastern (EST))
  - Summer (DST): UTC-4 (EDT)
- ZIP code: 13028
- Area codes: 315 & 680
- GNIS feature ID: 943742

Bernhards Bay is a hamlet in Oswego County, New York, United States. The community is located on the north shore of Oneida Lake along New York State Route 49, 2.5 miles (4.0 km) west of Cleveland. Bernhards Bay has a post office with ZIP code 13028.
