= Area codes 315 and 680 =

Area codes in New York state

Coordinates: 43°30′N 76°10′W

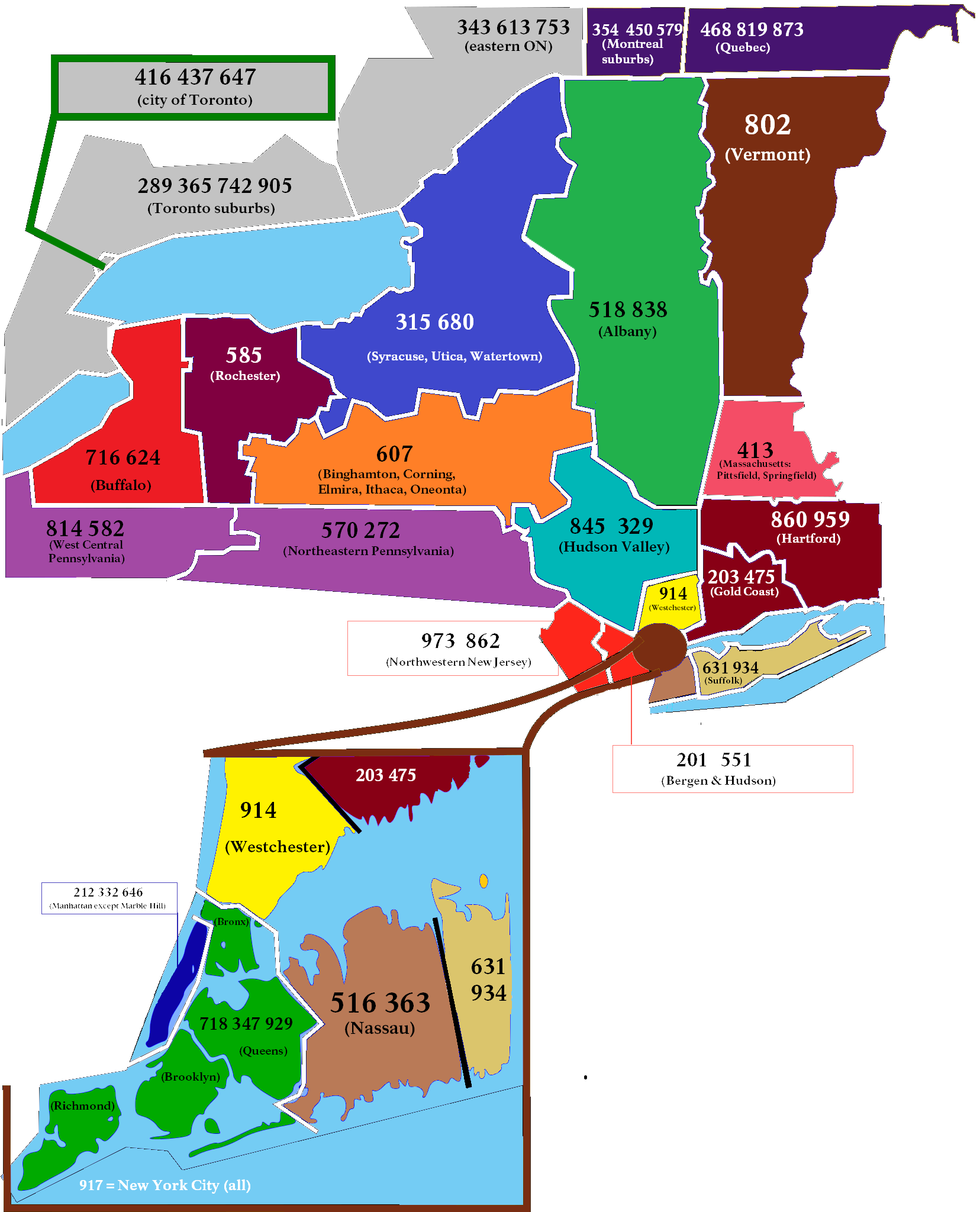
Area codes in New York state with NPA 315/680 in blue

Area codes 315 and 680 are telephone area codes of the North American Numbering Plan (NANP) for the north-central area of the U.S. state of New York. Area code 315 was installed as one of the original North American area codes in 1947, while area code 680 was added to the numbering plan area (NPA) in an overlay plan in 2017.

The service area extends from the western side of Wayne County to Little Falls, north to the Canada–United States border, east to Massena and south to near Cortland. Most of the area's population lives in Syracuse and its suburbs. Other major population areas include Utica and Watertown.

== History ==
Area code 315 was one of the original North American area codes created in 1947, when it was assigned to a numbering plan area (NPA) in central New York state that extended from the Canadian border with Ontario and Quebec southward to the Pennsylvania state line, including Binghamton and Syracuse. During 1954, its southern portion, including Binghamton, was combined with the southeastern corner of numbering plan area 716 in an area code split that created area code 607.

New York State regulators announced that 315 was threatened by numbering exhaustion for the third quarter of 2010. The New York State Public Service Commission at the time weighed two options, an overlay plan or a split plan. A numbering plan area division would have included a north-south arrangement, dividing Oswego County and the north from 315, or an east-west division, with Oswego and Onondaga forming the boundary. Regulators met to discuss a second code in the 315 region. Due to economic conditions, assignable numbers were not depleted during the third quarter of 2010 as projected. The revised exhaustion was estimated for 2017. On March 11, 2017, area code 680 was introduced, creating the first overlay in the upstate region.

Since 2017, telephone callers must dial ten digits for local calls for using most telephone services including Verizon and Charter Spectrum. Attempts to make a seven-digit call with these services activates an intercept message reminding them of the new rule. As of January 12, 2021, there were still some smaller phone services whose customers were still able to use seven digit dialing within area code 315 and connect to the person they were dialing.

As of 2020, very few if any numbers in the 680 area code were in use.

On March 15, 2022, a proclamation by Syracuse Mayor Ben Walsh and Onondaga County Executive Ryan McMahon declared recognition of '315 day'.

== Service area ==
=== Counties ===
- Cayuga
- Chenango
- Cortland
- Fulton
- Hamilton
- Herkimer
- Jefferson
- Lewis
- Madison
- Oneida
- Onondaga
- Ontario
- Oswego
- Otsego
- Saint Lawrence
- Seneca
- Wayne
- Yates

=== Cities, towns, villages, and hamlets ===
- Adams Center
- Adams
- Alder Creek
- Alexandria Bay
- Altmar
- Alton
- Annsville
- Antwerp
- Apulia Station
- Auburn
- Aurora
- Ava
- Baldwinsville
- Barneveld
- Beaver Falls
- Belleville
- Bernhards Bay
- Black River
- Blossvale
- Boonville
- Bouckville
- Branchport
- Brantingham
- Brasher Falls
- Brewerton
- Bridgeport
- Bridgewater
- Brier Hill
- Brookfield
- Brownville
- Calcium
- Camden
- Camillus
- Canastota
- Canton
- Cape Vincent
- Carthage
- Cassville
- Castorland
- Cato
- Cayuga
- Cazenovia
- Central Square
- Chadwicks
- Chase Mills
- Chaumont
- Chippewa Bay
- Chittenango
- Cicero
- Clark Mills
- Clay
- Clayton
- Clayville
- Cleveland
- Clifton Springs
- Clinton
- Clockville
- Clyde
- Cold Brook
- Colton
- Constableville
- Constantia
- Copenhagen
- Cranberry Lake
- Croghan
- De Kalb Junction
- De Peyster
- DeRuyter
- Deansboro
- Deer River
- Deferiet
- Delphi Falls
- Dewitt
- Denmark
- Depauville
- Dexter
- Dolgeville
- Dresden
- Durhamville
- Eagle Bay
- Earlville
- East Syracuse
- East Williamson
- Eaton
- Edwards
- Elbridge
- Ellisburg
- Erieville
- Evans Mills
- Fabius
- Fair Haven
- Fayette
- Fayetteville
- Felts Mills
- Fine
- Fishers Landing
- Forestport
- Fort Drum
- Frankfort
- Franklin Springs
- Fulton
- Geneva
- Genoa
- Georgetown
- Glenfield
- Gouverneur
- Great Bend
- Greig
- Hailesboro
- Hamilton
- Hammond
- Hannawa Falls
- Hannibal
- Harrisville
- Hastings
- Helena
- Henderson Harbor
- Henderson
- Herkimer
- Hermon
- Heuvelton
- Hinckley
- Hoffmeister
- Holland Patent
- Hubbardsville
- Ilion
- Inlet
- Jamesville
- Jordan
- Jordanville
- Keuka Park
- King Ferry
- Kirkville
- Knoxboro
- La Fargeville
- La Fayette
- Lacona
- Lawrence
- Lee Center
- Leonardsville
- Limerick
- Lisbon
- Little Falls
- Liverpool
- Locke
- Lorraine
- Lowville
- Lycoming
- Lyons Falls
- Lyons
- Madison
- Madrid
- Mallory
- Manlius
- Mannsville
- Maple View
- Marcellus
- Marcy
- Marietta
- Marion
- Martinsburg
- Martville
- Massena
- McConnellsville
- Memphis
- Meridian
- Mexico
- Middleville
- Minetto
- Minoa
- Mohawk
- Montezuma
- Moravia
- Morristown
- Morrisville
- Mottville
- Munnsville
- Natural Bridge
- Nedrow
- New Hartford
- New Haven
- New Woodstock
- New York Mills
- Newark
- Newport
- Newton Falls
- Nicholville
- Norfolk
- North Bay
- North Brookfield
- North Lawrence
- North Pitcher
- North Rose
- Norwood
- Oaks Corners
- Ogdensburg
- Old Forge
- Oneida
- Ontario Center
- Ontario
- Oriskany
- Oriskany Falls
- Orwell
- Oswegatchie
- Oswego
- Oxbow
- Palmyra
- Parish
- Parishville
- Penn Yan
- Pennellville
- Peterboro
- Phelps
- Philadelphia
- Phoenix
- Pierrepont Manor
- Plainville
- Plessis
- Poland
- Pompey
- Poplar Ridge
- Port Byron
- Port Gibson
- Port Leyden
- Potsdam
- Preble
- Prospect
- Pulaski
- Pultneyville
- Pyrites
- Raquette Lake
- Raymondville
- Red Creek
- Redfield
- Redwood
- Remsen
- Rensselaer Falls
- Richfield Springs
- Richland
- Richville
- Rodman
- Rome
- Romulus
- Rooseveltown
- Rose
- Russell
- Sackets Harbor
- Salisbury Center
- Sandy Creek
- Sangerfield
- Sauquoit
- Savannah
- Schuyler Lake
- Scipio Center
- Seneca Castle
- Seneca Falls
- Sherrill
- Skaneateles Falls
- Skaneateles
- Sodus
- Sodus Point
- Solsville
- Solvay
- South Butler
- South Colton
- South Otselic
- Springfield Center
- Star Lake
- Sterling
- Stittville
- Stratford
- Sylvan Beach
- Syracuse
- Taberg
- Thendara
- Theresa
- Thousand Island Park
- Three Mile Bay
- Tully
- Turin
- Union Springs
- Utica
- Van Hornesville
- Vernon Center
- Vernon
- Verona Beach
- Verona
- Waddington
- Walworth
- Wampsville
- Wanakena
- Warners
- Washington Mills
- Waterloo
- Watertown
- Waterville
- Weedsport
- Wellesley Island
- West Eaton
- West Edmeston
- West Leyden
- West Monroe
- West Stockholm
- West Winfield
- Westdale
- Westernville
- Westmoreland
- Whitesboro
- Williamson
- Williamstown
- Winthrop
- Wolcott
- Woodgate
- Yorkville

== See also ==
- List of New York area codes
- List of North American Numbering Plan area codes

New York area codes: 212/332/646, 315/680, 363/516, 518/838, 585, 607, 631/934, 624/716, 347/718/929, 329/845, 914, 917
	North: 343/613	
West: 585	315/680	East: 518/838
	South: 607	
Ontario area codes: 416/437/647/942, 519/226/548/382, 613/343/753, 705/249/683, 807, 905/289/365/742
