= West Bangor, New York =

- Hamlet
- Location within New York Location within the United States
- Coordinates: 44°48′15″N 74°26′02″W
- Country: United States
- State: New York
- County: Franklin
- Elevation: 725 ft (221 m)
- Time zone: UTC-5 (Eastern (EST))
  - Summer (DST): UTC-4 (EDT)
- ZIP code: 12966
- Area codes: 518 & 838
- GNIS feature ID: 969088

West Bangor is a hamlet in Franklin County, New York, United States. The community is located along New York State Route 11B, 7.5 miles (12.1 km) west-southwest of the village of Malone.
