= Sylvan Place =

Street in Manhattan, New York

Coordinates: 40.801064°N 73.938982°W

Sylvan Place is a former small street running from East 120th Street to East 121st Street, between and parallel to Lexington Avenue and Third Avenue, in the East Harlem neighborhood of Manhattan in New York City. The signage for the street still exists. The street's ground area now serves as Harlem Art Park and the Harlem Courthouse's frontage and parking lot.

Directly opposite Sylvan Place, on East 121st Street, is Sylvan Court Mews, or Sylvan Court (which is sometimes confused with Sylvan Place). Sylvan Court Mews is a small dead end private street and contains several 1880s townhouses. Unlike in other parts of these city with similar houses, like Greenwich Village and Brooklyn Heights, the small street and court have not been restored. Both Sylvan Place and Sylvan Court were part of the former East Post Road, which led from the city to Boston. The intersection of the East Post Road, Kingsbridge Post Road, Harlem Road, and Church Lane formed a five-cornered intersection, and the neighborhood that surrounded it was sometimes known as the Five Points, not to be confused with the neighborhood of the same name in lower Manhattan. Sylvan Place and Sylvan Court met at the former five-pointed intersection.

Sylvan Terrace, a historic grouping of 20 three-story, wood-framed townhouses or mews within the Jumel Terrace Historic District in Washington Heights, Manhattan, is sometimes erroneously known as Sylvan Place.
