= Lycoming, New York =

- Hamlet
- Location within New York Location within the United States
- Coordinates: 43°29′55″N 76°23′09″W
- Country: United States
- State: New York
- County: Oswego
- Elevation: 335 ft (102 m)
- Time zone: UTC-5 (Eastern (EST))
  - Summer (DST): UTC-4 (EDT)
- ZIP code: 13093
- Area codes: 315 & 680
- GNIS feature ID: 970324

Lycoming is a hamlet in Oswego County, New York, United States. The community is 6.9 miles (11.1 km) east-northeast of Oswego. Lycoming has a post office with ZIP code 13093, which opened on July 31, 1882.
