= Gilberts Corners, New York =

Hamlet in New York, United States

Coordinates: 43°09′18″N 78°31′13″W

Gilberts Corners is a hamlet in the town of Royalton in Niagara County, New York, United States.
