= Rose Hill, New York =

Hamlet in New York, United States

Rose Hill is a hamlet in a rural area of the town of Marcellus in Onondaga County, New York, United States, along Rose Hill Road. It is marked by a sign where the road climbs a hill and is included on maps.

42.9066°N 76.341877°W
