= Lake Effect =

Lake Effect may refer to:

- Lake-effect rain, a weather phenomenon commonly produced in above-freezing atmospheric conditions
- Lake-effect snow, a weather phenomenon commonly produced in below-freezing atmospheric conditions
- Lake Effect (journal), an American literary journal
- Lake Effect (film), a horror film directed by Sam Qualiana
