= Result, New York =

Coordinates: 42°21′25″N 73°56′52″W

Result is a populated place in Greene County, New York, United States. Greene County has a population of 49,221.

== History ==
A post office called Result was established in 1890, and remained in operation until it was discontinued in 1908. Result has been noted for its unusual place name.
