= Franklin Springs, New York =

- Hamlet
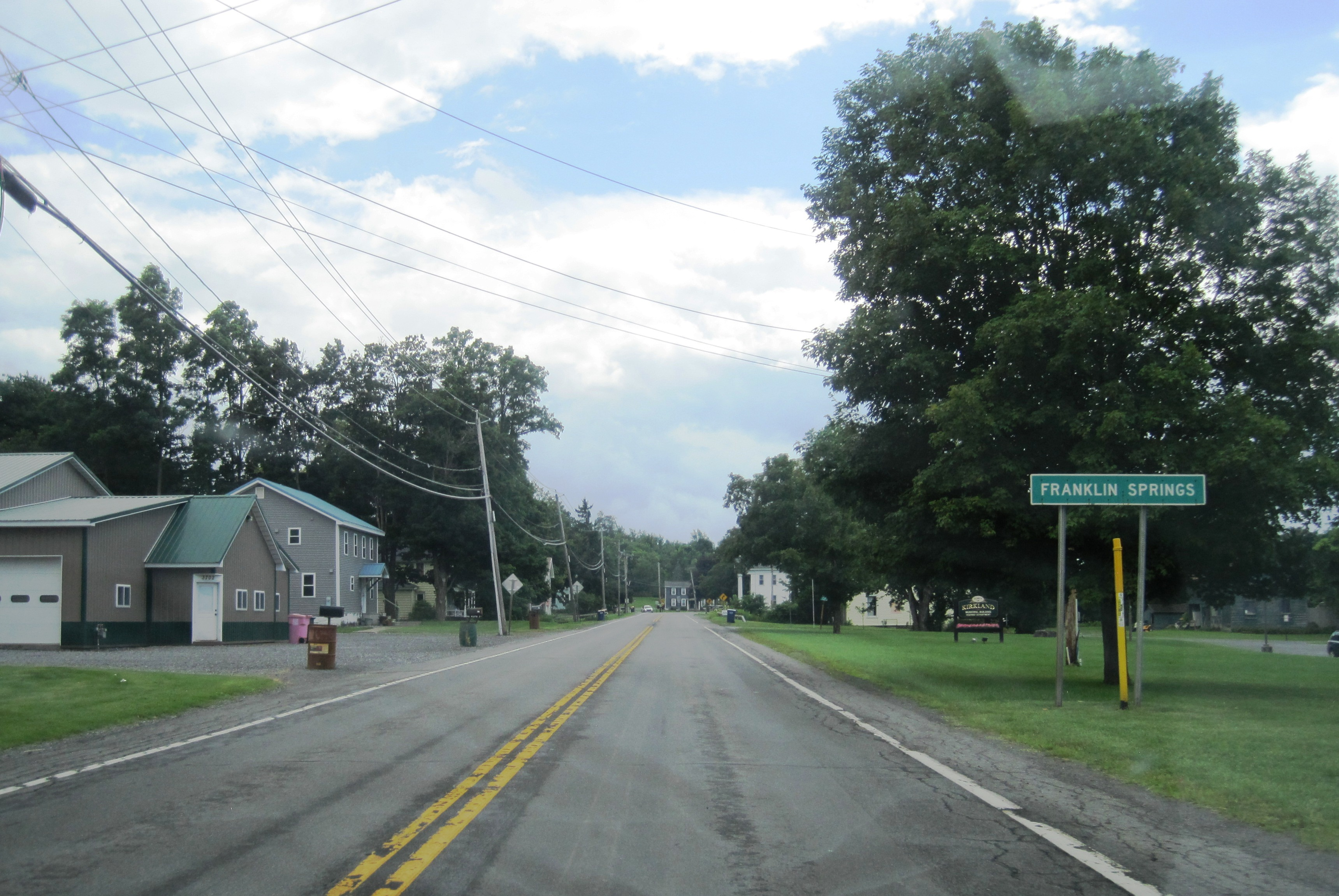
- Southbound NY 12B entering Franklin Springs

- Location within New York Location within the United States
- Coordinates: 43°02′12″N 75°23′32″W
- Country: United States
- State: New York
- County: Oneida
- Elevation: 630 ft (190 m)
- Time zone: UTC-5 (Eastern (EST))
  - Summer (DST): UTC-4 (EDT)
- ZIP code: 13341
- Area codes: 315 & 680
- GNIS feature ID: 950628

Franklin Springs is a hamlet in Oneida County, New York, United States. The community is located along New York State Route 12B, 1.1 miles (1.8 km) southwest of Clinton. Franklin Springs has a post office with ZIP code 13341.
