= Farmers Mills, Putnam County, New York =

Hamlet in New York, United States

Coordinates: 41°29′44″N 73°44′21″W

Farmers Mills is a hamlet in Putnam County, in the U.S. state of New York.

== History ==
Farmers Mills was named for the mill which operated at the site, serving farmers of the area. A post office operated under the Farmers Mills name from 1841 until 1923. A variant name was "Milltown".
