= List of places in New York: S =

This list of current cities, towns, unincorporated communities, counties, and other recognized places in the U.S. state of New York also includes information on the number and names of counties in which the place lies, and its lower and upper zip code bounds, if applicable.

List of places in New York: A | B | C | D | E | F | G | H | I | J | K | L | M | N | O | P | Q | R | S | T | U | V | W | X | Y | Z

Name of place	Counties	Principal county	Lower zip code	Upper zip code
Sabael	1	Hamilton County	12864	
Sabattis	1	Hamilton County	12847	
Sabbath Day Point	1	Warren County	12874	
Sacandaga	1	Fulton County	12134	
Sacandaga Park	1	Fulton County		
Sackets Harbor	1	Jefferson County	13685	
Sacketts Harbor	1	Livingston County		
Sacketts Lake	1	Sullivan County	12701	
Saddle Rock	1	Nassau County	11023	
Saddle Rock Estates	1	Nassau County	11021	
Sagamore Camp	1	Hamilton County		
Sagamore Hill National Historic Site	1	Nassau County	11771	
Sagaponack	1	Suffolk County	11962	
Sages Cottages	1	Suffolk County	11944	
Sagetown	1	Chemung County	14871	
Sag Harbor	1	Suffolk County	11963	
Sailors Snug Harbor	1	Richmond County	10301	
St. Albans	1	Queens County	11412	
St. Andrew	1	Orange County	12586	
St. Armand	1	Essex County		
St. Bernardine of Sienna College	1	Albany County		
St. Bonaventure	1	Cattaraugus County	14778	
Saint Elmo	1	Ulster County		
St. George	1	Richmond County	10301	
St. Huberts	1	Essex County	12943	
St. James	1	Suffolk County	11780	
St. James Heights	1	Suffolk County	11780	
St. John Fisher College	1	Monroe County	14618	
St. Johnsburg	1	Niagara County	14302	
St. Johns Place	1	Kings County	11213	
St. Johnsville	1	Montgomery County	13452	
St. Johnsville	1	Montgomery County		
Saint Josen	1	Ulster County		
St. Josephs	1	Sullivan County	12701	
St. Josephs Sanatarium	1	Sullivan County		
Saint Lawrence	1	Jefferson County		
St. Lawrence Park	1	Jefferson County	13607	
St. Mary's Park	1	Bronx County	10455	
Saint Regis	1	Franklin County		
St. Regis Falls	1	Franklin County	12980	
St. Regis Mohawk Indian Reservation	1	Franklin County	14204	
St. Remy	1	Ulster County	12401	
Saintsville	1	Onondaga County		
Saint Vencent de Paul Camp	1	Erie County		
Sala	1	Oswego County		
Salamanca	1	Cattaraugus County	14779	
Salamanca	1	Cattaraugus County		
Salem	1	Washington County	12865	
Salem	1	Washington County		
Salem Center	1	Westchester County	10578	
Salem Corner	1	Onondaga County		
Salina	1	Onondaga County	13208	
Salina	1	Onondaga County		
Salisbury	1	Herkimer County	13365	
Salisbury	1	Herkimer County		
Salisbury	1	Nassau County	11590	
Salisbury Center	1	Herkimer County	13454	
Salisbury Mills	1	Orange County	12577	
Salmon River	1	Clinton County	12901	
Saltaire	1	Suffolk County	11706	
Salt Point	1	Dutchess County	12578	
Salt Springville	2	Montgomery County	13320	
Salt Springville	2	Otsego County	13320	
Saltvale	1	Wyoming County		
Sammonsville	1	Fulton County	12068	
Sampson	1	Seneca County		
Samsondale	1	Rockland County	10993	
Samsonville	1	Ulster County	12461	
Sanborn	1	Niagara County	14132	
Sandford Boulevard	1	Westchester County	10550	
Sandfordville	1	St. Lawrence County	13676	
Sand Hill	1	Erie County	14001	
Sand Hill	1	Montgomery County	13339	
Sand Hill	1	Otsego County		
Sand Lake	1	Rensselaer County	12153	
Sand Lake	1	Rensselaer County		
Sand Point	1	Livingston County		
Sand Ridge	1	Oswego County	13132	
Sands Point	1	Nassau County	11050	
Sandusky	1	Cattaraugus County	14133	
Sandy Bay	1	Onondaga County		
Sandy Beach	1	Erie County	14072	
Sandy Creek	1	Oswego County	13145	
Sandy Creek	1	Oswego County		
Sandy Harbour Beach	1	Monroe County		
Sandy Pond	1	Oswego County	13142	
Sanford	1	Allegany County		
Sanford	1	Broome County	13754	
Sanford	1	Broome County		
Sangerfield	1	Oneida County	13455	
Sangerfield	1	Oneida County		
Sanitaria Springs	1	Broome County	13833	
San Remo	1	Suffolk County	11754	
Santa Clara	1	Franklin County	12980	
Santa Clara	1	Franklin County		
Santapoque	1	Suffolk County	11704	
Saranac	1	Clinton County	12981	
Saranac Inn	1	Franklin County	12982	
Saranac Lake	2	Essex County	12983	
Saranac Lake	2	Franklin County	12983	
Saratoga	1	Saratoga County		
Saratoga Air Force Station	1	Saratoga County	12866	
Saratoga Lake	1	Saratoga County		
Saratoga National Historical Park	1	Saratoga County	12170	
Saratoga Springs	1	Saratoga County	12866	
Sardinia	1	Erie County	14134	
Sardinia	1	Erie County		
Sarles Corners	1	Westchester County		
Saugerties	1	Ulster County	12477	
Saugerties	1	Ulster County		
Saugerties South	1	Ulster County	12477	
Sauquoit	1	Oneida County	13456	
Savannah	1	Wayne County	13146	
Savannah	1	Wayne County		
Savilton	1	Orange County		
Savona	1	Steuben County	14879	
Sawens	1	Genesee County		
Sawkill	1	Ulster County	12401	
Sawyer	1	Allegany County		
Sawyer	1	Niagara County	14120	
Sawyer	1	Orleans County		
Sawyers Corner	1	Cayuga County		
Saxon Park	1	Suffolk County	11706	
Saxton	1	Ulster County		
Sayville	1	Suffolk County	11782	
Scarborough	1	Westchester County	10510	
Scarsdale	1	Westchester County	10583	
Scarsdale (New Rochelle)	1	Westchester County	10583	
Scarsdale Downs	1	Westchester County	10583	
Scarsdale Park	1	Westchester County	10583	
Schaghticoke	1	Rensselaer County	12154	
Schaghticoke	1	Rensselaer County		
Schaghticoke Hill	1	Rensselaer County	12154	
Schenectady	1	Schenectady County	12301	25
Schenevus	1	Otsego County	12155	
Schepps Corners	1	Onondaga County		
Schodack	1	Rensselaer County		
Schodack Center	1	Rensselaer County	12033	
Schodack Junction	1	Columbia County		
Schodack Landing	1	Rensselaer County	12156	
Schoharie	1	Schoharie County	12157	
Schoharie	1	Schoharie County		
Schoharie Junction	1	Schoharie County		
Scholes	1	Allegany County		
Schonowe	1	Schenectady County		
Schroeppel	1	Oswego County		
Schroon	1	Essex County		
Schroon Falls	1	Essex County		
Schroon Lake	1	Essex County	12870	
Schultzville	1	Dutchess County	12572	
Schuluski Estates	1	Saratoga County	12188	
Schuyler	1	Herkimer County	13340	
Schuyler	1	Herkimer County		
Schuyler Falls	1	Clinton County	12985	
Schuyler Falls	1	Clinton County		
Schuyler Junction	1	Herkimer County		
Schuyler Lake	1	Otsego County	13457	
Schuylerville	1	Saratoga County	12871	
Scio	1	Allegany County	14880	
Scio	1	Allegany County		
Sciola	1	Clinton County		
Sciota	1	Clinton County	12992	
Scipio	1	Cayuga County		
Scipio Center	1	Cayuga County	13147	
Scipioville	1	Cayuga County	13147	
Sconondoa	1	Oneida County	13421	
Scotchbrush	1	Fulton County	13452	
Scotch Bush	1	Montgomery County	12010	
Scotch Church	1	Montgomery County		
Scotch Hill	1	Otsego County		
Scotchtown	1	Orange County	10940	
Scotia	1	Schenectady County	12302	
Scott	1	Cortland County	13077	
Scott	1	Cortland County		
Scottsburg	1	Livingston County	14545	
Scotts Corner	1	Orange County		
Scotts Corners	1	Jefferson County	13605	
Scotts Corners	1	Westchester County	10576	
Scottsville	1	Monroe County	14546	
Scranton	1	Erie County	14075	
Scriba	1	Oswego County		
Scriba Center	1	Oswego County	13126	
Scribner Corners	1	Madison County	13421	
Scuttlehole	1	Suffolk County	11932	
Sea Breeze	1	Monroe County	14617	
Sea Cliff	1	Nassau County	11579	
Seaford	1	Nassau County	11783	
Seagate	1	Kings County		
Seager	1	Ulster County	12406	
Searingtown	1	Nassau County	11507	
Searsburg	1	Schuyler County	14886	
Sears Corners	1	Putnam County	10509	
Searsville	1	Orange County	12549	
Seaside	1	Queens County		
Seaview	1	Suffolk County	11770	
Second Milo	1	Yates County	14527	
Secor Gardens	1	Westchester County	10583	
Seeley Creek	1	Chemung County	14871	
Seifert Corners	1	Oneida County	13440	
Selden	1	Suffolk County	11784	
Selkirk	1	Albany County	12158	
Selkirk	1	Oswego County		
Selkirk Beach	1	Oswego County	13142	
Selkirk Junction	1	Albany County		
Sellecks Corners	1	St. Lawrence County	13625	
Sempronius	1	Cayuga County	13118	
Sempronius	1	Cayuga County		
Seneca	1	Ontario County		
Seneca Army Depot	1	Seneca County	14541	
Seneca Castle	1	Ontario County	14547	
Seneca Falls	1	Seneca County	13148	
Seneca Falls	1	Seneca County		
Seneca Heights	1	Cattaraugus County		
Seneca Hill	1	Oswego County	13126	
Seneca Knolls	1	Onondaga County	13209	
Seneca Lake	1	Yates County		
Seneca Mills	1	Yates County		
Seneca Point	1	Ontario County	14512	
Sennett	1	Cayuga County	13150	
Sennett	1	Cayuga County		
Sentinel Heights	1	Onondaga County	13078	
Setauket	1	Suffolk County	11733	
Setauket	1	Suffolk County		
Setauket-East Setauket	1	Suffolk County		
Settlers Hill	1	Putnam County	10509	
Seven Hills	1	Putnam County	10512	
Seventh Day Hollow	1	Chenango County	13129	
Severance	1	Essex County	12872	
Severance	1	Monroe County		
Sevey	1	St. Lawrence County		
Seward	1	Schoharie County	12043	
Seward	1	Schoharie County		
Shackport	1	Delaware County	13757	
Shadigee	1	Orleans County	14098	
Shady	1	Ulster County	12409	
Shakers	1	Albany County		
Shamrock	1	Onondaga County		
Shandaken	1	Ulster County	12480	
Shandaken	1	Ulster County		
Shandelee	1	Sullivan County	12758	
Sharon	1	Dutchess County		
Sharon	1	Schoharie County	13459	
Sharon	1	Schoharie County		
Sharon Center	1	Schoharie County	13459	
Sharon Springs	1	Schoharie County	13459	
Sharon Station	1	Dutchess County		
Shawangunk	1	Ulster County		
Shaw Corners	1	Saratoga County		
Shawnee	1	Niagara County	14132	
Shea Stadium	1	Queens County		
Sheds	1	Madison County	13151	
Sheepshead Bay	1	Kings County		
Shekomeko	1	Dutchess County	12567	
Shelby	1	Orleans County	14103	
Shelby	1	Orleans County		
Shelby Basin	1	Orleans County	14103	
Shelby Center	1	Orleans County		
Sheldon	1	Wyoming County	14145	
Sheldon	1	Wyoming County		
Sheldon Center	1	Wyoming County		
Sheldon Corners	1	Wyoming County	14145	
Sheldon Hall	1	Chautauqua County		
Sheldrake	1	Seneca County	14521	
Sheldrake Springs	1	Seneca County	14847	
Shelter Island	1	Suffolk County	11964	
Shelter Island	1	Suffolk County		
Shelter Island Heights	1	Suffolk County	11965	
Shenandoah	1	Dutchess County		
Shenorock	1	Westchester County	10587	
Shepard Settlement	1	Onondaga County		
Sherburne	1	Chenango County	13460	
Sherburne	1	Chenango County		
Sherburne Four Corners	1	Chenango County		
Sheridan	1	Chautauqua County	14135	
Sheridan	1	Chautauqua County		
Sheridan Park	1	Ontario County	14456	
Sherlock Corners	1	Cayuga County		
Sherman	1	Chautauqua County	14781	
Sherman	1	Chautauqua County		
Sherman Park	1	Westchester County	10594	
Shermans Bay	1	Chautauqua County		
Shermerhorn Landing	1	St. Lawrence County	13646	
Sherrill	1	Oneida County	13461	
Sherwood	1	Cayuga County		
Sherwood Knolls	1	Onondaga County	13031	
Sherwood Park	1	Rensselaer County	12144	
Shin Hollow	1	Orange County		
Shinhopple	1	Delaware County	13837	
Shinnecock Hills	1	Suffolk County	11946	
Shinnecock Indian Reservation	1	Suffolk County	11968	
Shirley	1	Erie County		
Shirley	1	Suffolk County	11967	
Shokan	1	Ulster County	12481	
Sholam	1	Ulster County	12458	
Shongo	1	Allegany County	16923	
Shongo	1	Cattaraugus County		
Shooktown	1	Niagara County	14094	
Shore Acres	1	Chautauqua County	14712	
Shore Acres	1	Monroe County	14468	
Shore Acres	1	Suffolk County	11952	
Shore Acres	1	Westchester County		
Shoreham	1	Suffolk County	11786	
Shore Haven	1	Chautauqua County	14787	
Shorelands	1	Chautauqua County	14728	
Shore Oaks	1	Oswego County	13126	
Shorewood	1	Schuyler County		
Shorewood	1	Suffolk County	11721	
Shortsville	1	Ontario County	14548	
Short Tract	1	Allegany County	14735	
Shrub Oak	1	Westchester County	10588	
Shuetown	1	Lewis County		
Shultis Corners	1	Ulster County		
Shumla	1	Chautauqua County	14063	
Shunpike	1	Dutchess County		
Shurtleff	1	St. Lawrence County		
Shushan	1	Washington County	12873	
Shutter Corners	1	Schoharie County	12157	
Sibleyville	1	Monroe County	14472	
Sidney	1	Delaware County	13838	
Sidney	1	Delaware County		
Sidney Center	1	Delaware County	13839	
Siegfield Park	1	Suffolk County		
Siena	1	Albany County	12211	
Sierks	1	Wyoming County		
Sigby Corners	1	Madison County		
Sillimans Corners	1	Cattaraugus County	14030	
Siloam	1	Madison County		
Silver Bay	1	Warren County	12874	
Silver Beach	1	Suffolk County		
Silver Creek	1	Chautauqua County	14136	
Silver Lake	1	Orange County	10940	
Silver Lake	1	Otsego County		
Silver Lake Institute	1	Wyoming County	14549	
Silver Lake Assembly	1	Wyoming County		
Silver Lake Junction	1	Wyoming County		
Silver Lake Village	1	Orange County	10940	
Silvernails	1	Columbia County		
Silver Springs	1	Wyoming County	14550	
Simpsonville	1	Delaware County	12155	
Sinclairville	1	Chautauqua County	14782	
Sisson	1	St. Lawrence County		
Sissonville	1	St. Lawrence County	13676	
Skaneateles	1	Onondaga County	13152	
Skaneateles	1	Onondaga County		
Skaneateles Falls	1	Onondaga County	13153	
Skaneateles Junction	1	Onondaga County		
Skanondaga Heights	1	Onondaga County		
Skerry	1	Franklin County	12966	
Skinners Falls	1	Sullivan County		
Skinnerville	1	St. Lawrence County	13697	
Skunks Corner	1	Cattaraugus County		
Sky Meadow Farms	1	Westchester County	10573	
Sky Ranch	1	Saratoga County		
Skytop	1	Onondaga County		
Slab City	1	Chautauqua County		
Slab City	1	Cortland County		
Slab City	1	St. Lawrence County	13676	
Slabtown	1	Chemung County	14845	
Slate Hill	1	Orange County	10973	
Slaterville Springs	1	Tompkins County	14881	
Slateville	1	Washington County	12832	
Sleepy Hollow	1	Westchester County	10591	
Sleepy Hollow Manor	1	Westchester County	10591	
Sleggs Landing	1	Livingston County		
Sleightsburg	1	Ulster County	12466	
Slingerlands	1	Albany County	12159	
Sliters	1	Rensselaer County	12061	
Sloan	1	Erie County	14206	
Sloansville	1	Schoharie County	12160	
Sloatsburg	1	Rockland County	10974	
Slyboro	1	Washington County	12832	
Small Corners	1	Oneida County		
Smallwood	1	Sullivan County	12778	
Smartville	1	Oswego County	13083	
Smithboro	1	Tioga County	13840	
Smith Corners	1	Herkimer County	13407	
Smithfield	1	Dutchess County	12501	
Smithfield	1	Madison County		
Smith Mills	1	Chautauqua County	14062	
Smiths Basin	1	Washington County	12839	
Smiths Clove	1	Orange County		
Smiths Corner	1	Albany County	12120	
Smiths Corner	1	Wyoming County		
Smiths Corners	1	Fulton County		
Smithtown	1	Suffolk County	11788	
Smithtown	1	Suffolk County	11788	
Smithtown	1	Suffolk County		
Smithtown Branch	1	Suffolk County	11787	
Smithtown Pines	1	Suffolk County	11787	
Smith Valley	1	Schuyler County	14805	
Smithville	1	Chenango County		
Smithville	1	Jefferson County	13605	
Smithville Center	1	Chenango County	13778	
Smithville Flats	1	Chenango County	13841	
Smyrna	1	Chenango County	13464	
Smyrna	1	Chenango County		
Snake Hill	1	Saratoga County		
Sneden Landing	1	Rockland County		
Snowdon	1	Otsego County	13348	
Snufftown	1	Orange County	10924	
Snyder	1	Erie County	14226	
Snyder Crossing	1	Onondaga County		
Snyders Corner	1	Rensselaer County	12180	
Snyders Corners	1	Cattaraugus County		
Snyders Lake	1	Rensselaer County	12180	
Snyderville	1	Columbia County	12523	
Sodom	1	Putnam County	10509	
Sodom	1	Warren County	12853	
Sodus	1	Wayne County	14551	
Sodus	1	Wayne County		
Sodus Center	1	Wayne County	14554	
Sodus Point	1	Wayne County	14555	
Soft Maple	1	Lewis County		
Solon	1	Cortland County	13055	
Solon	1	Cortland County		
Solsville	1	Madison County	13465	
Solvay	1	Onondaga County	13209	
Somers	1	Westchester County	10589	
Somers	1	Westchester County		
Somerset	1	Niagara County	10412	
Somerset	1	Niagara County		
Somers Town	1	Westchester County	10589	
Somerville	1	St. Lawrence County	13642	
Sonora	1	Steuben County	14879	
Sonyea	1	Livingston County	14556	
Sound Beach	1	Suffolk County	11789	
Soundview	1	Bronx County	10472	
South	1	Westchester County	10705	
South Addison	1	Steuben County	14801	
South Alabama	1	Genesee County	14013	
South Albany	1	Albany County	12143	
South Albion	1	Oswego County	13302	
South Amenia	1	Dutchess County	12592	
Southampton	1	Suffolk County	11968	
Southampton	1	Suffolk County		
Southampton	1	Suffolk County	11968	
South Amsterdam	1	Montgomery County	12010	
South Apalachin	1	Tioga County	13732	
South Argyle	1	Washington County	12809	
South Attica	1	Wyoming County	14011	
South Avon	1	Livingston County		
South Barre	1	Orleans County		
South Bay	1	Madison County	13032	
South Bay	1	Onondaga County		
South Bay	1	Washington County		
South Bay Village	1	Washington County	12827	
South Beach	1	Richmond County		
South Berne	1	Albany County	12023	
South Bethlehem	1	Albany County	12161	
South Bloomfield	1	Ontario County	14469	
South Bolivar	1	Allegany County	14715	
South Bombay	1	Franklin County	12957	
South Bradford	1	Steuben County	14879	
South Bristol	1	Ontario County	14512	
South Bristol	1	Ontario County		
South Brookfield	1	Madison County	13485	
South Brooklyn	1	Kings County		
South Buffalo	1	Erie County	14210	
Southburg	1	Wyoming County		
South Butler	1	Wayne County	13154	
South Byron	1	Genesee County	14557	
South Cairo	1	Greene County	12482	
South Cambridge	1	Washington County	12028	
South Cameron	1	Steuben County		
South Canisteo	1	Steuben County	14823	
South Carrollton	1	Cattaraugus County		
South Centerville	1	Orange County		
South Chili	1	Monroe County	14546	
South Clyde	1	Wayne County	14433	
South Colton	1	St. Lawrence County	13687	
South Columbia	1	Herkimer County	13439	
South Corinth	1	Saratoga County	12822	
South Corning	1	Steuben County	14830	
South Cortland	1	Cortland County	13045	
South Cuba	1	Allegany County		
South Danby	1	Tompkins County	13864	
South Dansville	1	Steuben County	14807	
South Dayton	1	Cattaraugus County	14138	
South Dover	1	Dutchess County		
South Durham	1	Greene County	12405	
Southeast	1	Putnam County		
South Easton	1	Washington County		
Southeast Owasco	1	Cayuga County	13118	
South Edmeston	1	Otsego County	13466	
South Edwards	1	St. Lawrence County	13635	
South Fallsburg	1	Sullivan County	12779	
South Fallsburgh	1	Sullivan County		
South Farmingdale	1	Nassau County		
South Farmingdale	1	Nassau County	11735	
Southfields	1	Orange County	10975	
South Floral Park	1	Nassau County	11003	
South Fort Plain	1	Montgomery County		
South Galway Corner	1	Saratoga County		
South Gilboa	1	Schoharie County	12167	
South Glens Falls	1	Saratoga County	12803	
South Granby	1	Oswego County		
South Granville	1	Washington County	12832	
South Greece	1	Monroe County	14626	
South Greenfield	1	Saratoga County		
South Hamilton	1	Madison County	13332	
South Hammond	1	St. Lawrence County		
South Hannibal	1	Oswego County	13074	
South Hartford	1	Otsego County	13810	
South Hartford	1	Washington County	12838	
South Hartwick	1	Otsego County		
South Haven	1	Suffolk County	11719	
South Hempstead	1	Nassau County	11550	
South Highland	1	Putnam County		
South Hill	1	Tompkins County	14850	
South Holbrook	1	Suffolk County	11741	
South Horicon	1	Warren County	12815	
South Hornell	1	Steuben County	14843	
South Hudson Falls	1	Washington County	12828	
South Huntington	1	Suffolk County	11746	
South Ilion	1	Herkimer County	13357	
South Jamesport	1	Suffolk County	11970	
South Jefferson	1	Schoharie County	12167	
South Jewett	1	Greene County	12442	
South Junction	1	Clinton County		
South Kortright	1	Delaware County	13842	
South Lake	1	Putnam County	10512	
South Lansing	1	Tompkins County		
South Lebanon	1	Madison County	13332	
South Lima	1	Livingston County	14558	
South Livonia	1	Livingston County	14487	
South Lockport	1	Niagara County	14094	
South Manor	1	Suffolk County		
South Millbrook	1	Dutchess County	12545	
South New Berlin	1	Chenango County	13843	
South New Haven	1	Oswego County		
South Newstead	1	Erie County	14001	
South Nineveh	1	Broome County	13787	
South Nyack	1	Rockland County	10960	
Southold	1	Suffolk County	11971	
Southold	1	Suffolk County		
South Olean	1	Cattaraugus County	14760	
South Onondaga	1	Onondaga County	13120	
South Otselic	1	Chenango County	13155	
South Owego	1	Tioga County	13827	
South Oxford	1	Chenango County	13830	
South Ozone Park	1	Queens County	11420	
South Palmyra	1	Wayne County		
South Park	1	Erie County	14220	
South Plainedge	1	Nassau County	11758	
South Plattsburgh	1	Clinton County		
South Plymouth	1	Chenango County	13844	
South Pole	1	New York County	10090	
Southport	1	Chemung County		
Southport	1	Chemung County	14904	
Southport	1	Chemung County		
Southport	1	Suffolk County		
South Pulteney	1	Steuben County	14840	
South Richmond Hill	1	Queens County	11419	
South Ripley	1	Chautauqua County	14775	
South Road	1	Dutchess County	12601	
South Russell	1	St. Lawrence County	13684	
South Rutland	1	Jefferson County	13688	
South Saint Johnsville	1	Montgomery County	13339	
South Salem	1	Westchester County	10590	
South Schenectady	1	Schenectady County		
South Schodack	1	Rensselaer County	12162	
South Schroon	1	Essex County	12877	
South Scriba	1	Oswego County		
South Setauket	1	Suffolk County	11720	
South Side	1	Chemung County	14904	
South Sodus	1	Wayne County	14489	
South Spafford	1	Onondaga County		
South Stockton	1	Chautauqua County	14782	
South Stony Brook	1	Suffolk County	11790	
South Thurston	1	Steuben County		
South Trenton	1	Oneida County	13304	
South Troupsburg	1	Steuben County		
South Unadilla	1	Delaware County		
South Utica	1	Oneida County		
South Valley	1	Cattaraugus County		
South Valley	1	Otsego County	13320	
South Valley Stream	1	Nassau County	11581	
South Vandalia	1	Cattaraugus County	14706	
South Vestal	1	Broome County	13850	
Southview	1	Broome County	13903	
Southville	1	St. Lawrence County		
South Volney	1	Oswego County		
South Wales	1	Erie County	14139	
South Warsaw	1	Wyoming County	14569	
South Westbury	1	Nassau County	11590	
South Westerlo	1	Albany County	12163	
Southwest Hoosick	1	Rensselaer County		
Southwest Oswego	1	Oswego County	13126	
South Wilson	1	Niagara County	14108	
South Windsor	1	Broome County		
Southwood	1	Onondaga County	13078	
South Worcester	1	Otsego County	12197	
Spackenkill	1	Dutchess County	12603	
Spafford	1	Onondaga County	13077	
Spafford	1	Onondaga County		
Spafford Landing	1	Onondaga County		
Spafford Valley	1	Onondaga County		
Sparkill	1	Rockland County	10976	
Sparkle Lake	1	Westchester County	10598	
Sparrow Bush	1	Orange County	12780	
Sparta	1	Livingston County		
Sparta	1	Westchester County	10562	
Spaulding Furnace	1	Columbia County		
Spawn Hollow	1	Albany County		
Speculator	1	Hamilton County	12164	
Speedsville	1	Tompkins County	13736	
Speigletown	1	Rensselaer County	12182	
Spellmans	1	Clinton County	12901	
Spencer	1	Tioga County	14883	
Spencer	1	Tioga County		
Spencer Corners	1	Dutchess County		
Spencerport	1	Monroe County	14559	
Spencer Settlement	1	Oneida County	13440	
Spencertown	1	Columbia County	12165	
Speonk	1	Suffolk County	11972	
Sperryville	1	Lewis County		
Spinnerville	1	Herkimer County	13357	
Split Rock	1	Onondaga County	13031	
Spraguetown	1	Washington County		
Spragueville	2	Jefferson County	13689	
Spragueville	2	St. Lawrence County	13689	
Sprakers	1	Montgomery County	12166	
Spring Brook	1	Erie County	14140	
Spring Brook Station	1	Erie County	14140	
Spring Cove	1	Franklin County		
Spring Creek	1	Kings County	11239	
Springfield	1	Otsego County	13468	
Springfield	1	Otsego County		
Springfield Center	1	Otsego County	13468	
Springfield Four Corners	1	Otsego County		
Springfield Gardens	1	Queens County	11413	
Spring Glen	1	Ulster County	12483	
Spring Lake	1	Cayuga County	13140	
Spring Mills	1	Allegany County	14897	
Springport	1	Cayuga County		
Springs	1	Suffolk County	11937	
Springtown	1	Ulster County	12561	
Springvale	1	Chenango County	13815	
Spring Valley	1	Rockland County	10977	
Spring Valley	1	Westchester County	10562	
Springville	1	Erie County	14141	
Springville	1	Suffolk County	11946	
Springwater	1	Livingston County	14560	
Springwater	1	Livingston County		
Springwood Village	1	Dutchess County	12538	
Sprout Brook	1	Montgomery County	13317	
Sproutville	1	Dutchess County	12533	
Spruceton	1	Greene County	12492	
Spuyten Duyvil	1	Bronx County	10463	
Squassux Landing	1	Suffolk County		
Squiretown	1	Suffolk County	11946	
Squirrels Corners	1	Sullivan County		
Staatsburg	1	Dutchess County	12580	
Stacy Basin	1	Oneida County	13054	
Stadium	1	Bronx County	10452	
Stafford	1	Genesee County		
Stafford	1	Genesee County	14143	
Stafford	1	Genesee County		
Stairs Corners	1	Fulton County		
Stalbird	1	St. Lawrence County		
Staleyville	1	Schoharie County		
Stamford	1	Delaware County	12167	
Stamford	1	Delaware County		
Stanbro	1	Chenango County		
Standish	1	Clinton County	12952	
Stanford	1	Dutchess County		
Stanford Heights	1	Albany County	12301	
Stanfordville	1	Dutchess County	12581	
Stanley	1	Ontario County	14561	
Stanley Manor	1	Onondaga County	13031	
Stannards	1	Allegany County	14895	
Stanwix	1	Oneida County	13440	
Stanwix Heights	1	Oneida County	13440	
Stanwood	1	Westchester County	10549	
Stapleton	1	Richmond County	10304	
Starbuckville	1	Warren County	12817	
Stark	1	Herkimer County		
Stark	1	St. Lawrence County		
Starkey	1	Yates County	14837	
Starkey	1	Yates County		
Starks Knob	1	Saratoga County	12871	
Starkville	1	Herkimer County	13339	
Star Lake	1	St. Lawrence County	13690	
State Agricultural and Industrial School	1	Monroe County		
State Bridge	1	Oneida County	13054	
State Hospital	1	Dutchess County		
State Line	1	Chautauqua County	14775	
State Line	1	Dutchess County		
State Line Junction	1	Chemung County		
Staten Island	1	Richmond County		
State School	1	Dutchess County		
Statue of Liberty National Monument	1	New York County	10004	
Steamburg	1	Cattaraugus County	14783	
Steam Valley	1	Cattaraugus County	14760	
Stears Corners	1	Jefferson County	13659	
Stebbins Corners	1	Chautauqua County		
Stedman	1	Chautauqua County		
Steel City	1	Erie County	14218	
Steele Corners	1	Fulton County		
Steelton	1	Erie County	14225	
Steinbeck Corners	1	Putnam County		
Steinway	1	Queens County	11103	
Stella	1	Broome County	13905	
Stella Niagara	1	Niagara County	14144	
Stellaville	1	St. Lawrence County		
Stephens Mills	1	Steuben County	14843	
Stephentown	1	Rensselaer County	12168	
Stephentown	1	Rensselaer County		
Stephentown Center	1	Rensselaer County	12168	
Sterling	1	Cayuga County		
Sterling	1	Cayuga County	13156	
Sterling	1	Cayuga County		
Sterling Center	1	Cayuga County		
Sterling Forest	1	Orange County	10979	
Sterling Station	1	Cayuga County		
Sterlington	1	Rockland County	10974	
Sterling Valley	1	Cayuga County	13156	
Sterlingville	1	Jefferson County		
Stetsonville	1	Otsego County	13415	
Steuben	1	Oneida County	13354	
Steuben	1	Oneida County		
Steuben Valley	1	Oneida County	13354	
Stevens Landing	1	Clinton County		
Stever Mill	1	Fulton County	12025	
Stewart	1	Orange County	12552	
Stewart AFB	1	Orange County	12550	
Stewart Corners	1	Cayuga County		
Stewart Corners	1	Herkimer County		
Stewart Corners	1	Oswego County		
Stewart Manor	1	Nassau County	11530	
Stickneys	1	Steuben County		
Stiles	1	Onondaga County		
Stilesville	1	Delaware County	13754	
Stillham	1	Rensselaer County		
Stillman Village	1	Rensselaer County	12138	
Stillwater	1	Chautauqua County	14701	
Stillwater	1	Essex County		
Stillwater	1	Oswego County		
Stillwater	1	Putnam County		
Stillwater	1	Saratoga County	12170	
Stillwater	1	Saratoga County		
Stillwater Hill	1	Westchester County	10562	
Stillwater Junction	1	Saratoga County		
Stirling	1	Suffolk County	11944	
Stissing	1	Dutchess County	12581	
Stittville	1	Oneida County	13469	
Stockbridge	1	Madison County	13409	
Stockbridge	1	Madison County		
Stockholm	1	St. Lawrence County		
Stockholm Center	1	St. Lawrence County	13697	
Stockport	1	Columbia County	12050	
Stockport	1	Columbia County		
Stockport	1	Delaware County	13783	
Stockton	1	Chautauqua County	14784	
Stockton	1	Chautauqua County		
Stockwell	1	Oneida County	13480	
Stokes	1	Oneida County	13363	
Stokes Corner	1	Oneida County		
Stone Arabia	1	Montgomery County	13339	
Stone Church	1	Genesee County	14416	
Stonedam	1	Allegany County	16923	
Stone Gate	1	Orange County	10950	
Stonehouse	1	Dutchess County		
Stone Mills	1	Jefferson County	13656	
Stone Ridge	1	Montgomery County	12072	
Stone Ridge	1	Ulster County	12484	
Stony Brook	1	Suffolk County	11790	
Stony Creek	1	Warren County	12878	
Stony Creek	1	Warren County		
Stony Ford	1	Orange County		
Stony Hollow	1	Ulster County	12401	
Stony Point	1	Rensselaer County		
Stony Point	1	Rockland County	10980	
Stony Point	1	Rockland County		
Stoodley Corners	1	Schenectady County	12302	
Stormville	1	Dutchess County	12582	
Stottville	1	Columbia County	12172	
Stove Pipe City	1	Steuben County		
Stow	1	Chautauqua County	14785	
Stowersville	1	Essex County		
Straits Corners	1	Tioga County	13827	
Stratford	1	Fulton County	13470	
Stratford	1	Fulton County		
Strathmore	1	Nassau County	11030	
Stratton	1	Tompkins County		
Streeters Corners	1	Niagara County		
Street Road	1	Essex County	12883	
Strykersville	1	Wyoming County	14145	
Sturges Corner	1	Delaware County	13750	
Stuyvesant	1	Columbia County	12173	
Stuyvesant	1	Columbia County		
Stuyvesant	1	Kings County	11233	
Stuyvesant Falls	1	Columbia County	12174	
Sucker Brook	1	Wyoming County		
Suffern	1	Rockland County	10901	
Suffern Park	1	Rockland County	10901	
Suffolk County Airport	1	Suffolk County	11978	
Suffolk Developmental Center	1	Suffolk County	11746	
Sugarbush	1	Franklin County	12968	
Sugar Loaf	1	Orange County	10981	
Sugartown	1	Cattaraugus County	14741	
Suicide Corners	1	Genesee County		
Sullivan	1	Madison County	13037	
Sullivan	1	Madison County		
Sullivanville	1	Chemung County	14845	
Sulphur Springs	1	Jefferson County		
Summerdale	1	Chautauqua County		
Summerhill	1	Cayuga County	13092	
Summerhill	1	Cayuga County		
Summerville	1	Monroe County		
Summit	1	Schoharie County	12175	
Summit	1	Schoharie County		
Summit Hill	1	Broome County		
Summit Park	1	Rockland County	10977	
Summitville	1	Sullivan County	12781	
Sun	1	Franklin County	12917	
Sundown	1	Ulster County	12782	
Sun Haven	1	Westchester County	10801	
Sunmount	1	Franklin County	12986	
Sunmount Development Center	1	Franklin County		
Sunny Brae	1	Westchester County		
Sunnybrook	1	Putnam County		
Sunny Shores	1	Livingston County		
Sunnyside	1	Chautauqua County	14701	
Sunnyside	1	Columbia County		
Sunnyside	1	Queens County	11104	
Sunnyside	1	Richmond County		
Sunrise Terrace	1	Broome County	13905	
Sunset	1	Kings County	11220	
Sunset Bay	1	Chautauqua County	14081	
Sunset Bay	1	Chautauqua County	14712	
Sunset Beach	1	Niagara County	14172	
Sunset Beach	1	Orleans County	14571	
Sunset Manor	1	Oneida County	13492	
Sunset View	1	Wayne County		
Sunside	1	Greene County	12413	
Surprise	1	Greene County	12176	
Surrey Meadows	1	Orange County		
Suspension Bridge	1	Niagara County		
Suttons Corner	1	Oswego County		
Svahn Manor	1	Rockland County	10989	
Swain	1	Allegany County	14884	
Swains	1	Allegany County		
Swancott Mill	1	Lewis County		
Swan Lake	1	Sullivan County	12783	
Swartoutville	1	Dutchess County		
Swartwood	1	Chemung County	14889	
Swastika	1	Clinton County	12985	
Swazey Acres	1	Saratoga County	12188	
Sweden	1	Monroe County		
Sweden Center	1	Monroe County	14420	
Sweet Meadows	1	Ulster County	12601	
Sweets	1	Chenango County		
Sweets Crossing	1	Fulton County		
Sweets Crossing	1	Onondaga County		
Swenson Drive	1	Dutchess County	12590	
Sweyze	1	Suffolk County		
Swifts Mills	1	Erie County		
Swin	1	Allegany County		
Swormville	1	Erie County	14051	
Sycaway	1	Rensselaer County	12180	
Sylva	1	Ulster County		
Sylvan Beach	1	Oneida County	13157	
Sylvan Beach	1	Steuben County	14840	
Sylvan Lake	1	Dutchess County	12533	
Syosset	1	Nassau County	11791	
Syracuse	1	Onondaga County	13201	99
Syracuse Hancock International Airport	1	Onondaga County	13212	
Syracuse Junction	1	Onondaga County		
