= North Columbia =

North Columbia may refer to:

- North Columbia, California
- North Columbia, New York
- North Columbia Academy
