= Marietta, New York =

- Hamlet
- Location within the state of New York
- Coordinates: 42°54′32″N 76°19′24″W
- Country: United States
- State: New York
- County: Onondaga
- Town: Marcellus
- Settled: circa late 1790s
- Elevation: 800 ft (240 m)

Population (1880)
  - Total: 145
- Time zone: UTC-5 (Eastern (EST))
  - Summer (DST): UTC-4 (EDT)
- ZIP code: 13110
- Area code: 315

Marietta is a hamlet in the Town of Marcellus, Onondaga County, New York, United States. It is located along New York State Route 174 between the Village of Marcellus to the north and Otisco Lake to the south, approximately 15 miles (24 km) southwest of Syracuse. The hamlet sits near the outlet of Otisco Lake, where Nine Mile Creek begins its northward course to Onondaga Lake. Its post office has the ZIP code 13110.

== Geography ==
Marietta lies in the southern part of Onondaga County, within the hilly terrain of the northern Appalachian Plateau at the eastern edge of the Finger Lakes region. The hamlet is situated along the valley of Nine Mile Creek, which originates at the northern end of Otisco Lake—the easternmost and smallest of the Finger Lakes—and flows northward for approximately 22 miles (35 km) through the villages of Marcellus and Camillus to Onondaga Lake. Otisco Lake itself has an elevation of approximately 788 feet (240 m), and a dam at its northern end controls the outflow into Nine Mile Creek.

Nearby hamlets in the Town of Marcellus include Rose Hill to the west and Thorn Hill to the southwest. Borodino, in the adjacent Town of Spafford, lies approximately 3.5 miles (5.6 km) to the south.

== History ==
The area around Marietta was historically part of the territory of the Onondaga people, one of the original Five Nations of the Haudenosaunee (Iroquois) Confederacy. Following the American Revolutionary War, lands in the region were designated as part of the Central New York Military Tract, a tract of approximately 1.75 million acres set aside as bounty land for New York soldiers who served in the Revolution. The Town of Marcellus, named after the Roman general Marcus Claudius Marcellus, was Township No. 9 of the Military Tract. Settlement in the township began circa 1794, and the Town of Marcellus was formally organized that year.

The area immediately south of Marietta, around Thorn Hill, was settled in 1799 by David Earl, Eleazer Burns, Nathan Turner, and John Wiltsie. By the mid-19th century, Marietta had developed as a small milling and commercial center near the Otisco Lake outlet. The 1880 federal census recorded the "Village of Marietta" with a population of 145 inhabitants in 34 households. Writing in 1908, local historian William M. Beauchamp described Marietta as "a hamlet near and on the outlet of Otisco lake," and noted that by 1886 the hamlet supported two blacksmith shops, a general store, a wagon shop, a shoe shop, a hotel, a grist mill, a sawmill, and a cooper shop.

The completion of the Marcellus & Otisco Lake Railway on May 25, 1905, improved transportation to the area. The short-line railroad ran from a junction at Martisco on the New York Central Railroad southward along Nine Mile Creek through the Village of Marcellus to Otisco Lake, passing through or near Marietta. The line's 9.05 miles (14.56 km) of track required 46 curves to navigate the creek valley. Beauchamp noted that the railroad made the lake "easily accessible" as "a favorite resort." The railway was abandoned in 1937 after improved roads made automobile travel more practical.

In 1869, a dam was built at Otisco Lake's outlet to raise the water level by 9 feet (2.7 m) and create a reservoir for the Erie Canal. The dam was rebuilt in 1908, raising the level an additional 4 feet (1.2 m) to supply drinking water to the Syracuse area. In 1985, the Onondaga County Water Authority completed a multi-million dollar filtration plant near Otisco Lake, part of the regional water system that draws water from the lake via intake pipes and delivers it by gravity approximately 5 miles (8.0 km) to a treatment plant in Marcellus. A new post office was erected in Marietta in 1983, located at 2796 State Route 174.

== Services ==
Marietta is within the Marcellus Central School District. The hamlet is served by the Onondaga County Water Authority, which draws water from Otisco Lake and supplies customers in the southern and western portions of Onondaga County. The hamlet is part of the 315 area code region.

== See also ==
- Marcellus, New York
- Otisco Lake
- Ninemile Creek (Onondaga Lake tributary)
