= List of places in New York: D =

This list of current cities, towns, unincorporated communities, counties, and other recognized places in the U.S. state of New York also includes information on the number and names of counties in which the place lies, and its lower and upper zip code bounds, if applicable.

List of places in New York: A | B | C | D | E | F | G | H | I | J | K | L | M | N | O | P | Q | R | S | T | U | V | W | X | Y | Z

Name of place	Counties	Principal county	Lower zip code	Upper zip code
Dadville	1	Lewis County	13367	
Dahlia	1	Sullivan County	12758	
Dairyland	1	Ulster County	12435	
Daisy	1	Ulster County		
Dale	1	Wyoming County	14039	
Dalton	1	Livingston County	14836	
Damascus	1	Broome County	13865	
Dams Corner	1	Oneida County		
Danby	1	Tompkins County	14850	
Danielstown	1	Warren County		
Danley Corners	1	Wyoming County	14011	
Dannemora	1	Clinton County	12929	
Dansville	1	Livingston County	14437	
Dansville	1	Steuben County		
Danube	1	Herkimer County		
Danville	1	Broome County	13754	
Darien	1	Genesee County	14040	
Darien Center	1	Genesee County	14040	
Darrowsville	1	Warren County	12817	
Dashville	1	Ulster County		
Davenport	1	Delaware County	13750	
Davenport Center	1	Delaware County	13751	
Davidson Beach	1	Monroe County		
Davis Corners	1	Ulster County		
Davison Beach	1	Monroe County		
Davis Park	1	Suffolk County	11772	
Daws	1	Genesee County	14020	
Day	1	Saratoga County		
Day Center	1	Saratoga County		
Days Corners	1	Herkimer County		
Days Rock	1	Herkimer County	13407	
Daysville	1	Oswego County		
Dayton	1	Cattaraugus County	14041	
Dayton	1	Cattaraugus County		
Daytonville	1	Oneida County	13480	
Dean	1	Chautauqua County		
Deansboro	1	Oneida County	13328	
Deans Corners	1	Saratoga County		
Deans Mill	1	Greene County		
Debruce	1	Sullivan County	12758	
Decatur	1	Otsego County	12197	
Deck	1	Herkimer County	13407	
Deckertown	1	Schuyler County		
Deckertown	1	Sullivan County	12758	
Deerfield	1	Oneida County	13502	
Deerfield	1	Oneida County		
Deerfield	1	Suffolk County	11976	
Deerfield Heights	1	Oneida County		
Deerhead	1	Essex County		
Deerland	1	Hamilton County	12847	
Deerpark	1	Orange County		
Deer Park	1	Suffolk County	11729	
Deer River	1	Lewis County	13627	
Deferiet	1	Jefferson County	13628	
Deforest Corners	1	Putnam County		
Defreestville	1	Rensselaer County	12144	
Degrasse	1	St. Lawrence County	13684	
Degroff	1	Cayuga County		
De Kalb	1	St. Lawrence County	13630	
De Kalb	1	St. Lawrence County		
De Kalb Junction	1	St. Lawrence County	13630	
De Lancey	1	Delaware County	13752	
Delano Junction	1	Essex County		
Delanson	1	Schenectady County	12053	
Delaware	1	Albany County	12209	
Delaware	1	Sullivan County		
Delaware National Scenic River	1	Orange County	18324	
Delevan	1	Cattaraugus County	14042	
Delhi	1	Delaware County	13753	
Delhi	1	Delaware County		
Dellwood	1	Erie County		
Delmar	1	Albany County	12054	
Delphi Falls	1	Onondaga County	13051	
Delray	1	Erie County	14224	
Dempster Corners	1	Fulton County		
Demster	1	Oswego County	13126	
Demster Beach	1	Oswego County	13126	
Denault Corners	1	Rensselaer County		
Denison Corner	1	Ontario County		
Denmark	1	Lewis County	13631	
Denmark	1	Lewis County		
Denmark	1	Steuben County		
Dennies Crossing	1	Fulton County		
Dennies Hollow	1	Fulton County	12117	
Denning	1	Ulster County	12725	
Dennison Corners	1	Chautauqua County		
Dennison Corners	1	Herkimer County	13407	
Denniston	1	Orange County		
Dennytown	1	Putnam County		
Denton	1	Orange County	10958	
Denton Hills	1	Suffolk County	11721	
Denver	1	Delaware County	12421	
Depauville	1	Jefferson County	13632	
Depew	1	Erie County	14043	
De Peyster	1	St. Lawrence County	13633	
Deposit	2	Broome County	13754	
Deposit	2	Delaware County	13754	
Derby	1	Erie County	14047	
Derbys Corners	1	St. Lawrence County		
Dering Harbor	1	Suffolk County	11964	
Derrick	1	Franklin County		
DeRuyter	1	Madison County	13052	
Desbrough Park	1	Wayne County		
Deuels Corners	1	Erie County	14127	
Devereaux	1	Cattaraugus County	14731	
Devon	1	Suffolk County	11930	
Dewey	1	Monroe County	14613	
Dewey Bridge	1	Washington County	12827	
De Witt	1	Onondaga County	13214	
DeWitt Mills	1	Dutchess County		
Dewittville	1	Chautauqua County	14728	
Dexter	1	Jefferson County	13634	
Dexterville	1	Oswego County	13069	
Diamond Hill	1	Herkimer County	13365	
Diamond Point	1	Warren County	12824	
Diana	1	Lewis County		
Diana Center	1	Lewis County		
Dibbletown	1	Oneida County	13308	
Dickersonville	1	Niagara County	14131	
Dickinson	1	Broome County		
Dickinson	1	Franklin County		
Dickinson Center	1	Franklin County	12930	
Dick-Urban	1	Erie County	14043	
Diddell	1	Dutchess County		
Dillen	1	Jefferson County		
Dimmick Corners	1	Saratoga County	12831	
Dineharts	1	Steuben County	14810	
Dishaw	1	St. Lawrence County		
Ditch Plains	1	Suffolk County		
Divine Corners	1	Sullivan County	12759	
Divinity Hill	1	Suffolk County		
Dix	1	Oneida County		
Dix	1	Schuyler County		
Dix Hills	1	Suffolk County	11746	
Dobbs Ferry	1	Westchester County	10522	
Doctors Crossing	1	Genesee County	14001	
Dodge	1	Chautauqua County		
Dogtail Corners	1	Dutchess County	12594	
Dogtown	1	Otsego County		
Dolgeville	2	Fulton County	13329	
Dolgeville	2	Herkimer County	13329	
Dongan Hills	1	Richmond County		
Doodletown	1	Rockland County		
Doonan Corners	1	Delaware County	13739	
Doraville	1	Broome County	13813	
Doris Park	1	Oswego County	13044	
Dorloo	1	Schoharie County	12043	
Dormansville	1	Albany County	12055	
Douglass	1	Essex County	12944	
Douglaston	1	Queens County	11362	11363
Dover	1	Dutchess County		
Dover Furnace	1	Dutchess County		
Dover Plains	1	Dutchess County	12522	
Downsville	1	Delaware County	13755	
Downtown	1	Chemung County	14901	
Downtown	1	Monroe County	14603	
Downtown	1	Onondaga County	13201	
Doyle	1	Erie County	14206	
Dreiser Loop	1	Bronx County	10475	
Dresden	1	Washington County		
Dresden	1	Yates County	14441	
Dresden Station	1	Washington County	12887	
Dresserville	1	Cayuga County	13118	
Drew-Hamilton	1	New York County		
Drews Corner	1	Ontario County	13694	
Drewville Heights	1	Putnam County		
Driftwood	1	Chautauqua County		
Dryden	1	Tompkins County	13053	
Duane	1	Franklin County		
Duane	1	Schenectady County		
Duane Center	1	Franklin County	12968	
Duane Lake	1	Schenectady County		
Duanesburg	1	Schenectady County	12056	
Dublin	1	Seneca County	14433	
Dudley Settlement	1	Steuben County		
Duells Corner	1	Erie County		
Dugway	1	Oswego County	13131	
Dumbarton	1	Oneida County		
Dunbar	1	Broome County	13865	
Dundee	1	Yates County	14837	
Dunewood	1	Suffolk County	11706	
Dunham	1	Oneida County	13503	
Dunham Hollow	1	Rensselaer County	12018	
Dunham Manor	1	Oneida County	13492	
Dunkirk	1	Chautauqua County	14048	
Dunn Brook	1	Oneida County		
Dunnsville	1	Albany County	12009	
Dunraven	1	Delaware County	12455	
Dunsbach Ferry	1	Albany County	12047	
Dunwoodie	1	Westchester County		
Dunwoodie Heights	1	Westchester County		
Durham	1	Greene County	12422	
Durhamville	1	Oneida County	13054	
Durkeetown	1	Washington County	12828	
Durland	1	Orange County		
Durlandville	1	Orange County	10924	
Durso Corner	1	Greene County		
Dutcherville	1	Oswego County		
Dutchess Junction	1	Dutchess County	12508	
Dutch Flats	1	Wyoming County	14167	
Dutch Hollow	1	Orange County		
Dutch Hollow	1	Wyoming County	14145	
Dutch Settlement	1	Jefferson County		
Dutch Settlement	1	Oswego County		
Dutchtown	1	Erie County		
Dwaarkill	1	Ulster County	12566	
Dwelly Corners	1	Schoharie County		
Dyke	1	Steuben County	14832	
Dykemans	1	Putnam County	10509	
Dyker Heights	1	Kings County	11228	
Dysinger	1	Niagara County		
