= Spafford, New York =

- Town
- Location in Onondaga County and the state of New York.
- Coordinates: 42°49′58″N 76°18′6″W
- Country: United States
- State: New York
- County: Onondaga

Government
  - Type: Town Council
  - Town Supervisor: Christopher Kozub (R)
  - Town Council: Members' List: • Christine Fesko (D); • David Venezia (R); • Cherry Randall (R); • Luke DeWitt (R)

Area
  - Total: 39.22 sq mi (101.57 km^{2})
  - Land: 32.70 sq mi (84.69 km^{2})
  - Water: 6.52 sq mi (16.88 km^{2})
- Elevation: 1,490 ft (454 m)

Population (2020)
  - Total: 1,588
  - Density: 48.56/sq mi (18.75/km^{2})
- Time zone: UTC-5 (Eastern (EST))
  - Summer (DST): UTC-4 (EDT)
- FIPS code: 36-70057
- GNIS feature ID: 0979511
- Website: www.townofspafford.com

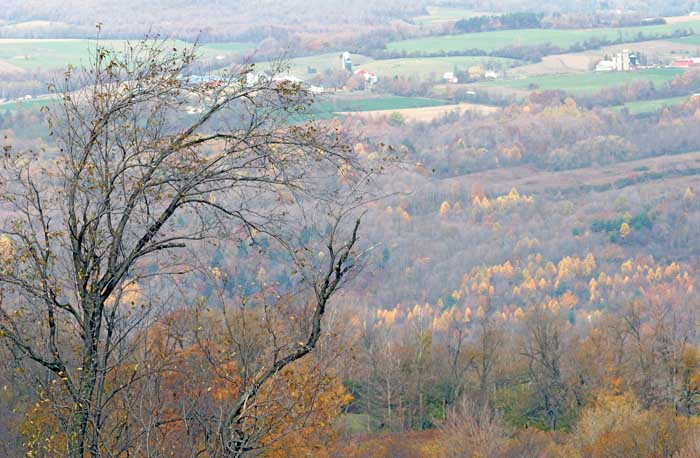
Some of the highest points in Onondaga County afford fine views.

Spafford is a town in Onondaga County, New York, United States. As of the 2020 Census, the population was 1,588. The town was named after Horatio Gates Spafford, a writer and founder of the local library. Spafford is in the southwestern corner of Onondaga County and is southwest of Syracuse.

== History ==
Spafford was located within the former Central New York Military Tract.

The first European settler arrived in 1794, the same year Onondaga County was established.

The Town of Spafford was formed in 1811 from parts of the Towns of Marcellus, Sempronius and Tully.

== Geography ==
According to the United States Census Bureau, the town has a total area of 39.2 square miles (102 km^{2}), of which 32.8 square miles (85 km^{2}) is land and 6.4 square miles (17 km^{2}) (16.31%) is water.

The western town line is the border of Cayuga County, and the southern town boundary is the border of Cortland County. Part of the town lies between Skaneateles Lake and Otisco Lake, two of the Finger Lakes.

Spafford's high terrain, between two of the Finger Lakes, provides spectacular scenery. Spafford is largely rural, with only small hamlets, and retains many forested areas, some protected as public preserves.

New York State Route 41 is a north–south highway in the town. New York State Route 174 is a state highway in the northern part of Spafford.

== Demographics ==
Historical population
Census	Pop.	Note	%±
1820	1,294		—
1830	2,647		104.6%
1840	1,873		−29.2%
1850	1,903		1.6%
1860	1,814		−4.7%
1870	1,595		−12.1%
1880	1,450		−9.1%
1890	1,227		−15.4%
1900	1,159		−5.5%
1910	1,064		−8.2%
1920	875		−17.8%
1930	767		−12.3%
1940	742		−3.3%
1950	829		11.7%
1960	974		17.5%
1970	1,148		17.9%
1980	1,596		39.0%
1990	1,675		4.9%
2000	1,661		−0.8%
2010	1,686		1.5%
2020	1,588		−5.8%
U.S. Decennial Census

Although situated in a remote corner of Onondaga County, somewhat isolated by two of the Finger Lakes, residential development is expanding into the town from adjacent Skaneateles. As of the census of 2000, there were 1,661 people, 631 households, and 485 families residing in the town. The population density was 50.6 inhabitants per square mile (19.5/km^{2}). There were 1,095 housing units at an average density of 33.4 per square mile (12.9/km^{2}). The racial makeup of the town was 98.74% White, 0.06% African American, 0.42% Native American, 0.18% Asian, and 0.60% from two or more races. Hispanic or Latino of any race were 0.36% of the population.

There were 631 households, out of which 35.0% had children under the age of 18 living with them, 65.0% were married couples living together, 7.1% had a female householder with no husband present, and 23.1% were non-families. 17.3% of all households were made up of individuals, and 5.2% had someone living alone who was 65 years of age or older. The average household size was 2.63 and the average family size was 2.97.

In the town, the population was spread out, with 25.5% under the age of 18, 5.7% from 18 to 24, 27.0% from 25 to 44, 30.8% from 45 to 64, and 11.0% who were 65 years of age or older. The median age was 41 years. For every 100 females, there were 105.1 males. For every 100 females age 18 and over, there were 103.1 males.

The median income for a household in the town was $53,553, and the median income for a family was $61,250. Males had a median income of $41,515 versus $31,071 for females. The per capita income for the town was $24,014. About 4.7% of families and 5.2% of the population were below the poverty line, including 7.2% of those under age 18 and 5.6% of those age 65 or over.

== Communities and locations in Spafford ==
- Borodino – The largest hamlet in Spafford, located approximately eight miles south of the Village of Skaneateles.
- Borodino Landing – A hamlet west on Borodino, located on the shore of Skaneateles Lake, south of Woodland.
- Edgewater Park – A small community surrounding Five Mile Point on the eastern lakeside, located on NY-41 in the northeastern corner of the town.
- Gifford Hill – An elevation near the southern town line, south of South Spafford.
- Jenny Point – A location north of Willow Point on the lake shore.
- Pine Grove – A hamlet on the shore of Skaneateles Lake, south of Borodino Landing.
- Ripley Hill – An elevation in the south of Spafford alleged to be the highest point in Onondaga County.
- South Spafford – A hamlet by the southern town line.
- Spafford – The hamlet of Spafford is on NY-41 in the southern part of the town.
- Spafford Creek – A stream feeding Otisco Lake in the southeastern section of the town.
- Spafford Forest – An Onondaga County preserve with public trails.
- Spafford Landing (formerly "Randalls Point") – located on the shore of Skaneateles Lake, southwest of Spafford village.
- Spafford Valley – A hamlet in the southeastern part of the town, northeast of Spafford village.
- Ten Mile Point – A location south of Pine Grove on the lake shore.
- Willow Point – A projection into Skaneateles Lake southwest of Spafford village.
- Woodland – A lakeside hamlet south of Edgewater Park.
