= Ninemile Creek (Onondaga Lake tributary) =

Nine Mile Creek
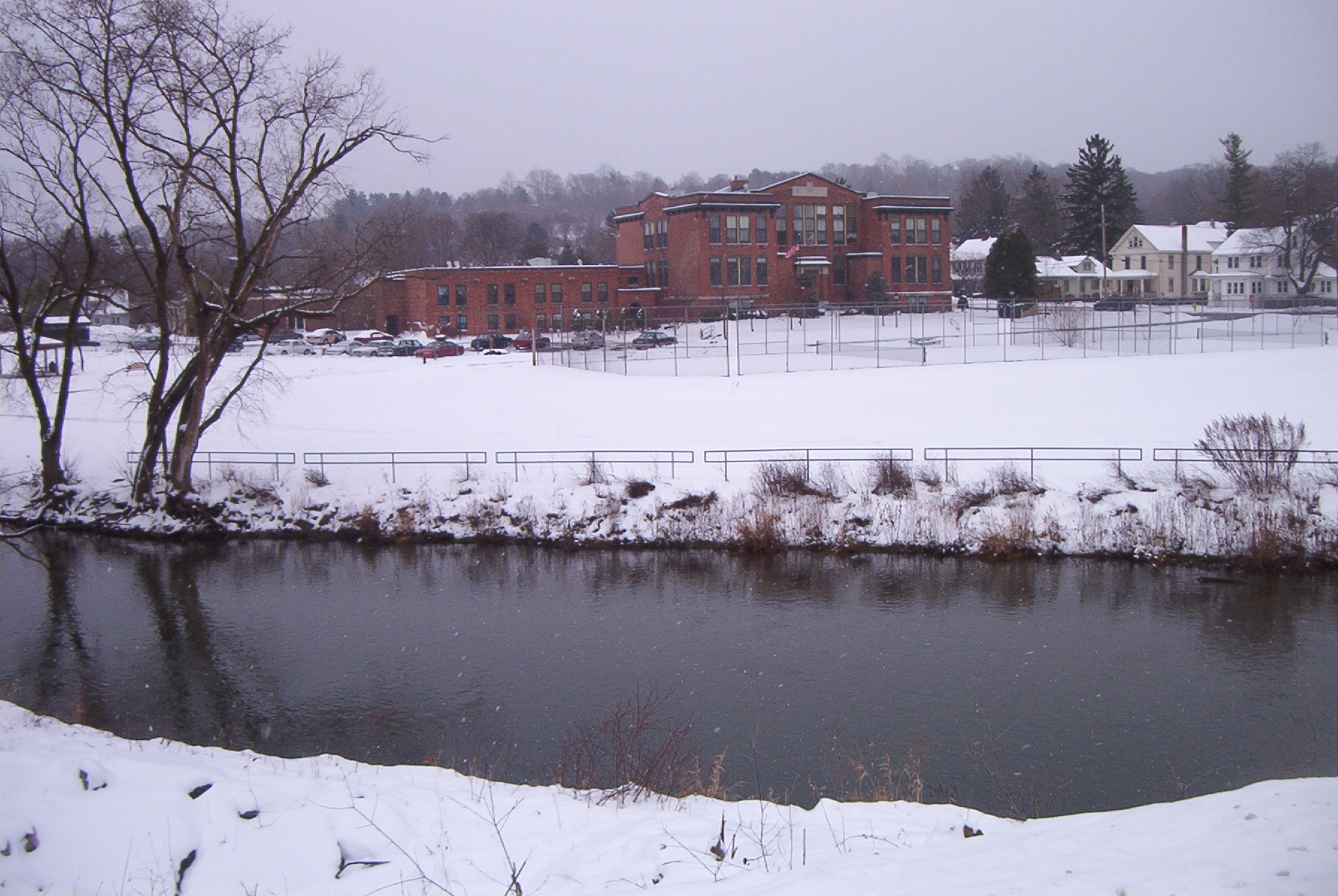
- Nine Mile Creek in Camillus

Location
- Country: United States
- State: New York
- Region: Central New York
- County: Onondaga County
- Cities: Marietta, Marcellus, Camillus, Solvay, Syracuse

Physical characteristics
- Source: Otisco Lake
  - location: Southeast of Marietta
  - coordinates: 42°54′16″N 76°18′47″W
  - elevation: 785 ft (239 m)
- Mouth: Onondaga Lake
  - location: Lakeland
  - coordinates: 43°05′21″N 76°13′46″W
  - elevation: 375 ft (114 m)

Basin features
- Waterfalls: Marcellus Falls

Ninemile Creek, also known as Nine Mile Creek, is a stream in Central New York in the United States. Its source is at Otisco Lake in the town of Marcellus, from where the creek runs northward for 21.75 miles (35.00 km) through the villages of Marcellus and Camillus to Onondaga Lake in the town of Geddes. Nine Mile Creek is a scenic stream noted for trout fishing.

The Solvay Process Company deposited industrial waste near the creek and Onondaga Lake from the late 19th century to the late 20th century. Recent reclamation has significantly restored quality in the final stretch of the creek. Farther to the south and upstream, the state of New York maintains fishing access sites.

== History ==
The Town of Marcellus was built around Nine Mile Creek and an appreciation of the Creek is necessary for understanding the Town's history. The Nine Mile Creek valley was known for its very productive agricultural soils and its "deep picturesque valley" of eastern hemlocks. Since the late 1700s some 25 mills were established along Nine Mile Creek. Deacon Samuel Rice and Judge Dan Bradley built the first mill on the creek between 1795 and 1796. While the mill is no longer standing it was reportedly built south of the village. The Crown Mill, which is located in the village on State Route 174, is one of the few old mills still standing. The mill was demolished in 2016. Robert and Thomas Dyer built it in 1812. The mill has since changed hands many times.

Interest in rail transportation peaked in the late 19th century. After railroad fever took hold in the 1870s, a short-line railroad was constructed that connected Otisco Lake to Marcellus. Through incorporation of the Marcellus & Otisco Lake Railway Company, the rail line was eventually completed on May 25, 1905. The project was more difficult than anticipated, with 46 curves constructed in just 9.05 miles (14.56 km) of track. Connection with the Fontney, Otisco Lake's ferryboat, made transportation of people and goods relatively easier. The M&OL Railway was abandoned on July 15, 1937, after roads for motorcars were constructed in the region. The short-line railroad was a unique chapter in the town's history with only an empty railroad grade and an old station building remaining. The grade and arches nevertheless are still a prominent feature of the lower reaches of the creek within Marcellus.

=== Waste Beds ===
The lower part of Nine Mile Creek (from Route 173 to Onondaga Lake) has been significantly affected by the construction and operation of waste beds containing byproducts from the production of sodium carbonate by the Solvay Process. The Solvay Process Company (later acquired by Allied Corp.) began production in 1886. Initially wastes from the process were deposited along the shore of Onondaga Lake. Starting in 1916, waste beds 1–6 were constructed on the shore of the lake in the vicinity of Nine Mile Creek, and the creek was diverted to the north around beds 5 and 6.

The beds along Nine Mile Creek near the lakeshore were abandoned after 1944 when a waste bed dike failed, causing flooding of portions of the Village of Solvay by the waste. A series of additional waste beds (beds 9–15) were then constructed along Nine Mile Creek upstream of the lake. A portion of the creek was rerouted to allow construction of beds 9, 10, and 11.

The creek in this section shows an increase in pH and a decrease in phosphate concentration, due to the high alkalinity of leachate from the wastebeds.

A clean-up program is currently being conducted by Honeywell (the successor to Allied Signal) along the lower part of Nine Mile Creek and for Onondaga Lake under terms of a consent order with the New York State Department of Environmental Conservation. Documents concerning the clean-up can be found here: Onondaga Lake Cleanup

== Physical Characteristics ==
Nine Mile Creek transforms itself several times throughout its approximately 10-mile-long (16 km) course through the Town of Marcellus. Nine Mile Creek drops in elevation between the Otisco Lake outlet and the Camillus-Marcellus town line by 360 feet (110 m) making the average stream velocity about 0.8 ft/s. The maximum depth is 5.5 feet (1.7 m) and average depth is 1.0 feet. (Update for entire creek )

A distinct difference in the creeks character occurs north versus south of the Village of Marcellus. South of the Village, one finds a meandering shallow stream with dense bank vegetation and the occasional beaver impoundment. The dam at the north end of Otisco Lake controls the flow of the creek and strongly influences the first several kilometers of the stream. Warm surface water from the lake feeds Nine Mile Creek in summer months making it intolerable for coldwater stream fish such as trout. In this reach, however, a diverse fishery is maintained, with a wide variety of fish more closely associated with warm waters. North of the Village the stream cuts through the Alps region (a steep sided valley cut through the Onondaga Escarpment) and experiences a drop in temperature as ground water influx increases. Dissolved oxygen levels increase moving northward while pH levels remain constant. This section is indicative of a typical limestone-based freestone stream.

=== Watershed ===
Overall, the Nine Mile Creek watershed covers 115 square miles (300 km^{2}) and includes portions of ten towns within Onondaga County and two towns in Cortland County. Nine Mile Creek is the major tributary of Onondaga Lake, comprising almost 50% of the catchment area of the Lake.

=== Geology ===
The contemporary landscape of central New York is primarily a result of glacial activity between one million and ten thousand years ago. The last glacier to recede (starting about 19,000 years ago and leaving New York entirely approximately 11,000 years ago) deposited the Valley Heads Moraine, a prominent geological feature that separates the St. Lawrence watershed from the Susquehanna watershed. Before the deposition of the Valley Heads Moraine, glaciers had deepened the many north-south oriented valleys that characterize the region. These valleys originally were streams that flowed to the south. The moraine formed a series of lakes in the valleys. Drainage was still to the south over the moraine until the glacier retreated far enough to the north to allow escape of the waters along the southern edge of the glacier. At an elevation of about 900 feet, the glacial lakes filling the finger lakes valleys joined to form an interlocking system of lakes to the west (glacial Lake Warren). At first Lake Warren continued to drain to the west, but as the ice retreated west of Rome, New York, flow shifted to the east into the Mohawk-Hudson River system. As the ice continued to retreat, a series of east-west channels were cut by the easterly flowing glacial meltwater. According to Fairchild, the westernmost of these was the gully that runs from near Mud Pond about 4 miles north-northeast of Skaneateles and 4 miles north-northwest of Marcellus and empties into Nine Mile Creek 2 miles south of the Village of Marcellus. The water was impounded in the Otisco Valley (glacial Lake Marcellus), and the delta formed where debris carried by this meltwater stream was deposited as it entered the lake can be easily seen on topographic maps. The meltwater soon continued draining to the east, carving the channel now known as Pumpkin Hollow that leads east from the Village of Marcellus. With the continuing northward retreat of the glacier, meltwater deepened the Nine Mile Creek Valley and cut the Camillus Valley that runs east from Martisco to the Village of Camillus. For a time this channel discharged to the east towards Syracuse at an elevation of about 500 feet. Eventually the glacier receded far enough north to open the channel near Rome New York that resulted in the formation of Glacial Lake Iroquois at an elevation of about 440 feet. Lake Iroquois had a relatively long existence, but 13,400 years ago the collapse of an ice dam led to the rapid draining of Lake Iroquois, and Nine Mile Creek started to assume its present form.

==== Disappearing Lake ====
The Disappearing Lake area in Pleasant valley area is a geologically significant feature of the area. This lake is located on an area of karst geology, which is typified by a cavernous underground landscape. Through the use of water tracer dyes, Proett (1978) identified a distinct hydrologic connection between Disappearing Lake and its eventual outlet into Nine Mile Creek at Marcellus Falls. Although Disappearing Lake is a springtime phenomenon, groundwater outlets at Marcellus Falls have been observed to be active as late as October. These groundwater flows serve as a significant input of cold, nutrient-rich waters during summer months. It is notable that water flowing through karst systems is sensitive to change. This is because water flows too quickly through such cavernous networks to allow pollutants to be removed from the system. In particular, White noted that nitrates are not broken down as they flow through karst drainages. Thus nitrate inputs into the groundwater system at Pleasant Valley may be expected to be similar to the outputs into Nine Mile Creek at Marcellus Falls. From this perspective, sources of road salt, agricultural runoff, and E. Coli are all concerns for upland areas associated with Disappearing Lake area. This is because they may eventually alter water quality in Nine Mile Creek below Marcellus Falls.

A similar phenomenon occurs in the watershed of Geddes Brook, the largest tributary of Ninemile Creek. The headwaters of Geddes Brook disappear into channels in the limestone at Lost Lake, at the top of the Onondaga escarpment. The stream reappears at the foot of the escarpment as a series of springs.

=== Soils ===
The predominant soil types associated with the Nine Mile Creek corridor are Teel and Wayland silt loam, soils typical of flood plain environments. These are alluvial soil, which by nature are easily eroded and deemed unsuitable for development. From just north of Sevier Road to just south of the village line, the creek takes on a stained color due to natural siltation from the silt loam soils that comprise its bank. Obviously, extensive and chronic sources of siltation in the area could cause sediment overload that would smother stream biota requiring clear water. Although showing a much different character, the soils bordering the creek north of the Village of Marcellus are not free from erosion hazards. The steep valley walls in this section create flash flood potential due to rapid runoff with little opportunity for stormwater retention.

== Ecology ==
=== Flora ===
The Nine Mile Creek corridor supports a high diversity of plants due to a temperate climate, wide range of wetland and terrestrial habitats, nutritious limestone bedrock, and floodplain soils. In total, some 142 different species of plants have been documented in the Nine Mile Creek corridor and its associated wetlands. Ninety-two of these species are commonly occurring throughout the Nine Mile Creek corridor, whereas the other 49 occur in specific locations along the creek.

In terms of variation in plant communities along the creek, there is a rather uniform floral composition from the outlet of Otisco Lake to Masters Road. Dense herbivorous vegetation and numerous layers of forest canopy typify it. A mix of herbaceous and woody vegetation provides robust riparian buffers. This area is home to many of the 92 commonly seen plant species observed in the Nine Mile Creek area, and is also home to protected ferns and such protected or rarely seen plants as cardinal flower, button bush, speckled alder, and mild water pepper.

From Masters Road to the Village center, there is vegetation similar to that in the upper sections. However, additional species include Scotch pine and butternut, both of which are occasionally seen in the area. This section includes the only regulated wetland in the town of Marcellus, MAR-11, that is located within the flood plain of Nine Mile Creek. The flora of this wetland includes blue flag, crack willow, hardstem bulrush, numerous sedges (Carex sp.) and dogwoods (Cornus sp.).

Due east of the DEC parking area at Marcellus Falls and along the Nine Mile Creek corridor are steep slopes and a group of important springs which drain into the creek. The area is of considerable botanical interest. In 1983, the Adirondack Wildflower Club documented the flora north of the town center by walking down the old Martisco Railroad bed. Aside from documenting all of the 92 commonly seen species in the creek corridor, the club noted the presence of the following state protected plants: large-flowered trillium, stinking Benjamin or wake-robin, bloodroot, fancy (toothed) wood fern, fragile fern and bulblet fern. Also present here were trees not observed in other sections of the creek: northern white cedar, American sycamore, eastern hemlock and yellow birch.

=== Fishery ===
Nine Mile Creek's geomorphology creates a diverse fishery, thereby making it the most popular trout stream in Onondaga County. State and private stocking projects along with migration from Otisco and Onondaga Lakes have contributed to the creek’s impressive diversity of fishes, which totals some thirty species (DEC 1996). By comparison, most free flowing drainages in the northeast only support from 6 to 20 species. In the town of Marcellus, Nine Mile Creek comprises two distinct fisheries. Otisco Lake outlet to the old Crown Mill (adjacent to Marcellus Falls) contains species more tolerant of warm water and low dissolved oxygen levels. This section of creek averages thirteen species, with more species found closer to the Otisco Lake outlet. While trout numbers are low in this upper section, other stream fishes are very abundant, including an estimated 6000+ fish per acre near the Lawrence Rd. Crossing (DEC 1996). Fish diversity is much lower in this section with only an average of 7 fish species. Trout presence is quite impressive with typically more than 500 trout per acre (DEC 1996). Most of the trout captured by NYSDEC biologists in August 1996 were of wild strain indicating successful reproduction and growth in the stream. Amphipods (scuds) are extremely abundant in this area indicating both favored water quality and a quality food base for trout growth. Recent (2004–2005) Trout habitat has improved trout density.

Nine Mile Creek is subject to Onondaga County's special fishing regulation for trout of a daily limit of 5, with no more than 2 larger than 12" (the 5/2 rule). The trout season is open from 4/1 to 10/15.

=== Wildlife ===
The riparian zone of the Nine Mile Creek corridor provides a relatively narrow belt of habitat suitable for many forms of wildlife. Based on data being collected under the New York State Breeding Bird Atlas as well as field observations by SUNY ESF students, they estimate that Nine Mile Creek supports 90 species of breeding birds and many more during migration periods. During field visits to the Creek in the fall of 2002, large flocks of Neotropical migrants were observed, which suggests that the corridor serves as a migration pathway.

== Recreation ==
Nine Mile Creek receives a variety of recreational usage, both on the water and off. In addition to fishing and boating, there are many publicly and privately held green spaces such as at Marcellus Falls and Baltimore Woods.

=== Fishing ===
Fishing is the main form of recreation along Nine Mile Creek. The Creek is notable as an outdoor classroom for the seasoned angler as well as for the parent and child. From Crown Mill downstream to the Marcellus town boundary, cooler and highly oxygenated water supports a healthy trout fishery, which receives the most fishing hours. While a self-sustaining population of brown trout and brook trout exist, thousands of 1-year and 2-year browns and 1-year brookies are stocked from Onondaga County's Carpenters Brook Fish Hatchery every year. However, NYSDEC electrofishers have found that wild brown trout are predominant after the heavy spring fishing pressure, from Marcellus Falls downstream.

=== Paddling ===
Public access and some docks exist along Nine Mile Creek, but the Creek is generally only deep enough to boat in from Munro Park in the Village of Camillus downstream to the mouth at Onondaga Lake. While some sections of fast moving water exist, as well as hazards such as low dams (at Warners Rd) and low overhangs (at Route 5 Culvert and Erie Canal Aqueduct), paddling in Nine Mile Creek is accessible to both experienced and inexperienced paddlers.

== Education ==
A number of educational institutions directly benefit from Nine Mile Creek. These include SUNY ESF, Syracuse University, and Marcellus High School, which use the creek for various class outings and field laboratories. Students involved in the educational opportunities facilitated by these institutions see many plants, birds and other organisms that they do not see elsewhere. In the article "ESF Puts Environment in High School", cooperation between the SUNY College of Environmental Science and Forestry and Marcellus High School in performing studies at Nine Mile Creek was headlined in the November 13, 2001, issue of the Post Standard. It is notable that much of the biological, hydrological and geological information gathered for this article was found in graduate theses that were written by students at Syracuse University and SUNY ESF.

=== NGO / nonprofit activity ===
Many grassroot and national groups do work on behalf of Nine Mile Creek. A partial list:

- Nine Mile Creek Conservation Council has worked to create an officially designated water trail, and conducts an annual fish-stocking event by canoe.
- Project Watershed utilizes two locations on Nine Mile Creek in the Town of Marcellus to collect water quality data.
- Izaak Walton League has worked to foster angling resources and events.
- Trout Unlimited conducts stream cleanup events.
- Onondaga Soil and Water has done stream stabilization and riparian ecosystem improvement projects.
- CNY Land Trust owns a large parcel along Nine Mile Creek south of the Village of Camillus and allows public fishing access
- Community Science Institute monitors the water quality of Nine Mile Creek through their volunteer-led Red Flag Monitoring Program.

== See also ==
- List of rivers in New York
- Otisco Lake
- Onondaga Lake
