= Ripley Hill =

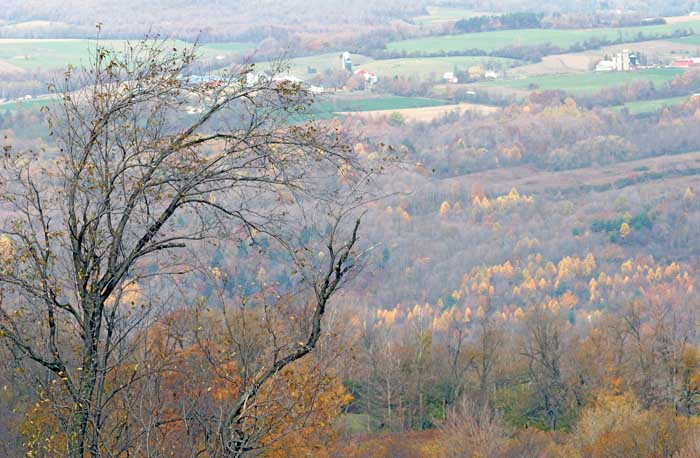
- Tree on Ripley Hill as it appeared in 2005

Highest point
- Elevation: 1,982 feet (604 m)
- Coordinates: 42°47′25″N 76°14′25″W

Geography
- Location within New York Adirondack Park Location within the United States
- Location: Onondaga County, New York, U.S.
- Topo map: USGS Otisco Valley

Ripley Hill straddles the divide between the Skaneateles Lake and Otisco Lake watersheds, it is one of the highest points in Onondaga County, New York, at 1,986 feet, below the high point of Highland Forest, Fellows Hill 2019 ft and Morgan Hill at 2060 ft.

Ripley Hill offers a sweeping panorama to the north and east. 109 acres (44 ha) of the hill are operated as a nature preserve by the Central New York Land Trust. Ripley Hill is near Spafford Forest, an Onondaga County preserve with hiking and dirt bike trails. The hill is accessed by a public dirt road, seasonally maintained. Adjoining property is privately owned and may be posted, especially during hunting season.
