= Columbia, New York =

- Town
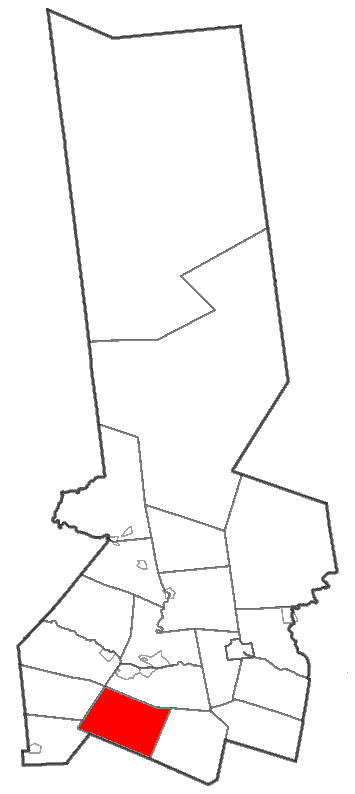
- Location within Herkimer County

- Location within New York Location within the United States
- Coordinates: 42°55′40″N 75°2′51″W
- Country: United States
- State: New York
- County: Herkimer

Government
  - Type: Town Council
  - Town Supervisor: Nathan Seamon (R)
  - Town Council: Members' List: • H. Ed Reed (R); • James Cotton (R); • Bruce Learned (R); • Ryan Fagan (R)

Area
  - Total: 35.10 sq mi (90.92 km^{2})
  - Land: 35.07 sq mi (90.84 km^{2})
  - Water: 0.031 sq mi (0.08 km^{2})
- Elevation: 1,480 ft (450 m)

Population (2020)
  - Total: 1,569
  - Density: 44.7/sq mi (17.27/km^{2})
- Time zone: UTC-5 (Eastern (EST))
  - Summer (DST): UTC-4 (EDT)
- ZIP Codes: 13357 (Ilion); 13361 (Jordanville); 13407 (Mohawk); 13439 (Richfield Springs); 13491 (West Winfield)
- Area code: 315
- FIPS code: 36-043-17431
- GNIS feature ID: 0978855
- Website: https://townofcolumbiany.gov/

Columbia is a town in Herkimer County, New York, United States. As of the 2020 census, the town population was 1,569. The town is at the southern border of the county and is southeast of Utica.

== History ==
The area was called "Coonradstown" during the early settlement period. The original settlers, mainly of German extraction, abandoned their holdings during the American Revolution, and the next settlement period took place circa 1791. The first school, opened in 1795, was taught in the German language.

The town was organized in 1812 from part of the town of Warren, which was itself created by a partition of the town of German Flatts. Since its establishment the Town of Columbia has thrived on agriculture. In 1824 there was a reported a population of 2,051 and more than 5,000 sheep, nearly 2,000 cattle, and four grist mills. The population of Columbia in 1865 was 1,732.

The Town of Columbia embraced the rising popularity of auto racing after World War II with the opening of two racetracks in 1953. Columbia Raceway, a 1/4-mile (0.40 km) dirt oval opened in Orendorf Corners, while Richfield Springs Speedway, a 1/2-mile (0.80 km) dirt oval facility opened three miles away in South Columbia. The Orendorf Corners oval, sanctioned by the Eastern Mutual Racing Association, operated through the 1954 season and spawned the career of Hall of Fame driver Lou Lazzaro. Richfield Springs Speedway was sanctioned by NASCAR through 1955, and continued with motorcycle events until 1957. (Note: Geolocation of Columbia Raceway: 42.9234°N 75.0095°W; Geolocation of Richfield Springs Speedway: 42.8817°N 74.9952°W)

== Geography ==
According to the United States Census Bureau, the town has a total area of 35.1 square miles (90.9 km^{2}), of which 35.1 square miles (90.8 km^{2}) are land and 0.03 square miles (0.08 km^{2}), or 0.06%, are water.

The southern town line is the border of Otsego County.

The Unadilla River, a tributary of the Susquehanna River, rises in the center of the town and flows westward. The northern part of the town drains northward towards the Mohawk River.

New York State Route 28 is a major north–south highway through Columbia.

== Demographics ==
Historical population
Census	Pop.	Note	%±
1820	2,051		—
1830	2,181		6.3%
1840	2,129		−2.4%
1850	2,000		−6.1%
1860	1,893		−5.3%
1870	1,637		−13.5%
1880	1,616		−1.3%
1890	1,380		−14.6%
1900	1,268		−8.1%
1910	1,071		−15.5%
1920	911		−14.9%
1930	915		0.4%
1940	931		1.7%
1950	1,132		21.6%
1960	1,327		17.2%
1970	1,387		4.5%
1980	1,537		10.8%
1990	1,587		3.3%
2000	1,638		3.2%
2010	1,580		−3.5%
2020	1,569		−0.7%
U.S. Decennial Census

As of the census of 2000, there were 1,630 people, 581 households, and 457 families residing in the town. The population density was 46.6 inhabitants per square mile (18.0/km^{2}). There were 631 housing units at an average density of 18.0 per square mile (6.9/km^{2}). The racial makeup of the town was 98.53% White, 0.06% African American, 0.49% Native American, 0.12% Asian, 0.06% Pacific Islander, and 0.74% from two or more races. Hispanic or Latino of any race were 0.37% of the population.

There were 581 households, out of which 39.2% had children under the age of 18 living with them, 64.7% were married couples living together, 7.7% had a female householder with no husband present, and 21.3% were non-families. 17.7% of all households were made up of individuals, and 7.6% had someone living alone who was 65 years of age or older. The average household size was 2.81 and the average family size was 3.12.

In the town, the population was spread out, with 28.1% under the age of 18, 7.9% from 18 to 24, 29.9% from 25 to 44, 23.5% from 45 to 64, and 10.6% who were 65 years of age or older. The median age was 36 years. For every 100 females, there were 110.6 males. For every 100 females age 18 and over, there were 104.5 males.

The median income for a household in the town was $36,758, and the median income for a family was $43,864. Males had a median income of $30,605 versus $22,031 for females. The per capita income for the town was $15,591. About 10.9% of families and 14.5% of the population were below the poverty line, including 23.1% of those under age 18 and 12.4% of those age 65 or over.

== Government ==
The town is governed by a Board consisting of a Supervisor and four Counsel Members. Other elected officials include the Highway Superintendent and Town Clerk.

In 2025, the New York State Commission on Judicial Conduct determined that town justice John M. Skinner “did not understand the role of a judge" and recommended his removal. After an appeal, he resigned in April 2026. He was replaced by Gene Doremus, who had been the Town Court Clerk.

== Communities and locations in Columbia ==
- Cedarville – A hamlet at the western town line on County Road 18.
- Columbia Center – A hamlet near the middle of the town at the junction of County Roads 18 and 101.
- Dennison Corners – A hamlet on NY-28 at the northern town line.
- Elizabethtown – A hamlet in the northern part of the town, south of North Columbia at the junction of County Roads 43 and 123.
- Getman Corners – A hamlet on NY-28, south of Dennison Corners.
- Jones Hill – An elevation located east of Cedarville.
- Kingdom – A hamlet at the eastern town line, southeast of Getman Corners.
- Millers Mills – A location north of Millers Mills Crossing, located west of Unadilla Lake.
- Millers Mills Crossing – A hamlet in the southwestern corner of the town.
- Monkey Mountain – An elevation located southwest of Columbia Center.
- North Columbia – A hamlet in the northwestern part of the town.
- Orendorf Corners – A location north of South Columbia on NY-28 at County Road 18.
- Richfield Hill – An elevation located south of Millers Mills. Partially in the Town of Richfield.
- Schuyler Corners *ndash; A location north of South Columbia, located on NY-28.
- South Columbia – A hamlet in the southeastern part of the town on NY-28.
- Spinnerville – A hamlet east of North Columbia and west of Dennison Corners, located near the northern town line.
- Spoon Hill – An elevation located north-northwest of Columbia Center.
- Unadilla Lake – A small lake formed by the widening of the Unadilla River in the southwestern part of the town.
- Youngs Crossing – A hamlet near the southern town line, west of McCoon Crossing.

== See also ==
- Herkimer County Historical Society
