= Newstead, New York =

- Town
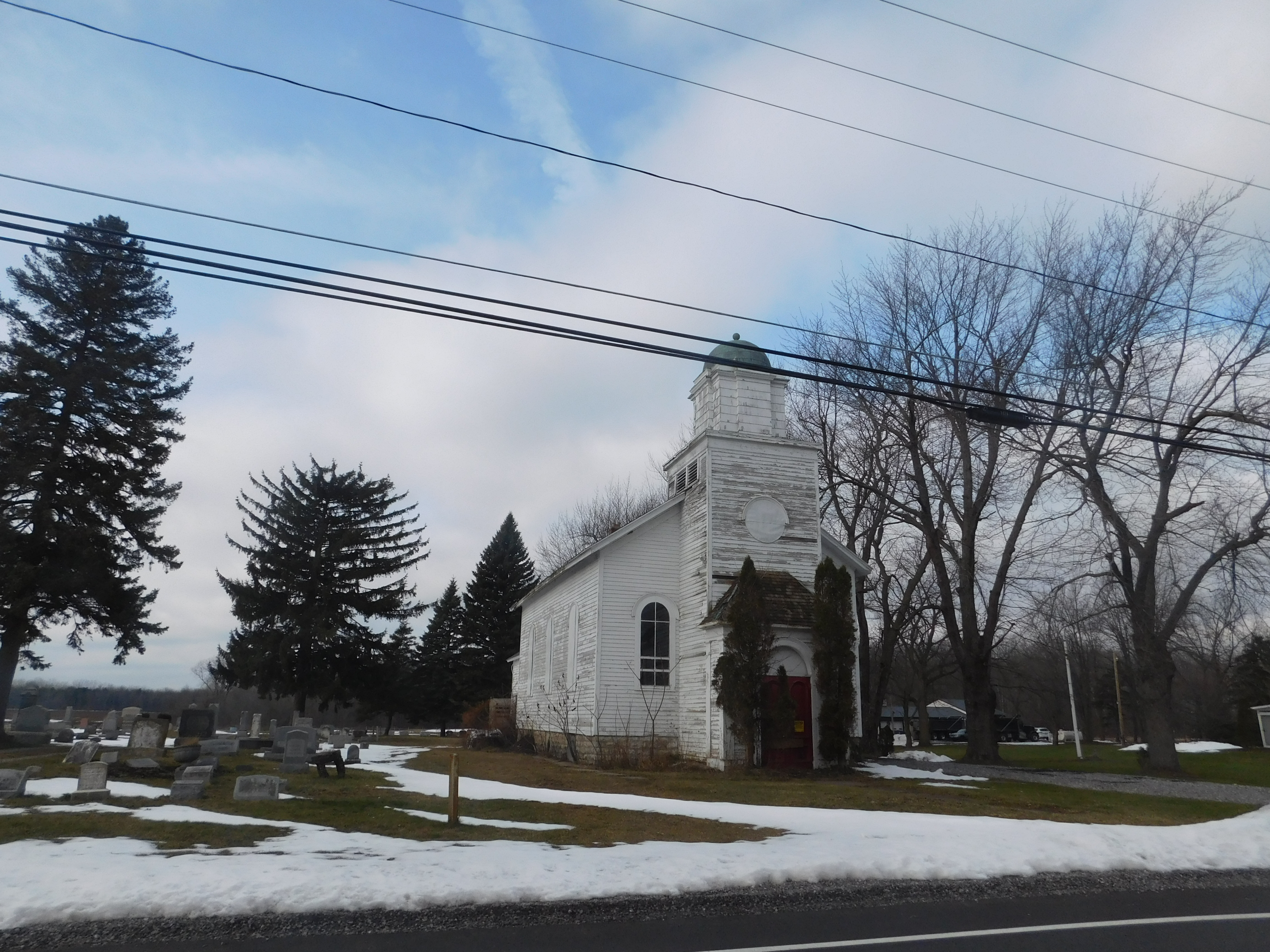
- Abandoned church

- Seal

- Location in Erie County and the state of New York.

- Location of New York in the United States
- Coordinates: 43°00′49″N 78°30′54″W
- Country: United States
- State: New York
- County: Erie County
- Incorporated: 1823
- Named for: Newstead Abbey, England

Government
  - Town Supervisor: Dawn D. Izydorczak Town Council: John Jendrowski; Joe Dugan; Edmund Burke; Patricia Pope

Area
  - Total: 51.05 sq mi (132.21 km^{2})
  - Land: 50.76 sq mi (131.46 km^{2})
  - Water: 0.29 sq mi (0.74 km^{2})
- Elevation: 659 ft (201 m)

Population (2020)
  - Total: 8,689 ▲
  - Density: 170.8/sq mi (65.95/km^{2})
- Time zone: UTC-5 (EST)
  - Summer (DST): UTC-4 (EDT)
- ZIP Codes: 14001 (Akron); 14004 (Alden); 14031 (Clarence); 14032 (Clarence Center)
- Area code: 716
- FIPS code: 36-029-50716
- FIPS code: 36-50716
- GNIS feature ID: 0979273
- Website: www.erie.gov/newstead

Newstead is the northeasternmost town in Erie County, New York, United States. The population was 8,689 at the 2020 census. The name is reportedly derived from Newstead Abbey in England.

Newstead is northeast of Buffalo, and its principal community is the village of Akron.

== History ==
The town was first settled circa 1801.

The town of Newstead was established in 1823 as the "Town of Erie" from the eastern part of the town of Clarence. In 1831, the town's name was changed to "Newstead", reportedly on the advice of Abigail Fillmore, who was fond of the poetry of Lord Byron.

A fire in the 1870s destroyed town records, leaving little historical information about the town between 1823 and 1870.

The discovery of gypsum and the growth of the related cement industry helped promote the area.

== Geography ==
According to the United States Census Bureau, the town has a total area of 51.05 square miles (132.21 km^{2}), of which 50.76 square miles (131.46 km^{2}) is land and 0.29 square miles (0.74 km^{2}), or 0.56%, is water.

Newstead is in the northeast corner of the county, and Tonawanda Creek defines the northern boundary.

=== Adjacent towns ===
- Clarence - west
- Royalton in Niagara County - north
- Alabama in Genesee County - east
- Pembroke in Genesee County - east
- Darien in Genesee County - southeast
- Alden - south
- Lancaster - southwest

The village of Akron lies within the town, east of the town's geographic center.

=== Major highways in the Town of Newstead ===
- Interstate 90 (New York State Thruway) (east-west), passes through the southern part of town from Clarence to Pembroke.
- New York State Route 5 (Main St.), east–west highway that passes through the southern part of town from Clarence to Pembroke.
- New York State Route 93 (Maple Rd., Lewis Rd., Buell St. in Newstead; Cedar St., Buffalo St., Buell St. in Akron), north–south highway from Youngstown that travels through Niagara County and into Newstead and has its southern terminus south of Akron at NY 5 (Main Street).

== Demographics ==
Historical population
Census	Pop.	Note	%±
1830	1,926		—
1840	2,653		37.7%
1850	2,899		9.3%
1860	3,162		9.1%
1870	3,380		6.9%
1880	3,570		5.6%
1890	3,721		4.2%
1900	3,884		4.4%
1910	3,607		−7.1%
1920	4,043		12.1%
1930	4,334		7.2%
1940	4,268		−1.5%
1950	4,653		9.0%
1960	5,825		25.2%
1970	6,322		8.5%
1980	7,231		14.4%
1990	7,440		2.9%
2000	8,404		13.0%
2010	8,594		2.3%
2020	8,689		1.1%
U.S. Decennial Census

As of the census of 2000, there were 8,404 people, 3,371 households, and 2,332 families residing in the town. The population density was 164.9 inhabitants per square mile (63.7/km^{2}). There were 3,623 housing units at an average density of 71.1 per square mile (27.5/km^{2}). The racial makeup of the town was 98.20% White, 0.40% African American, 0.77% Native American, 0.12% Asian, 0.10% from other races, and 0.40% from two or more races. Hispanic or Latino of any race were 0.52% of the population.

There were 3,371 households, out of which 30.3% had children under the age of 18 living with them, 57.2% were married couples living together, 8.5% had a female householder with no husband present, and 30.8% were non-families. 26.1% of all households were made up of individuals, and 13.7% had someone living alone who was 65 years of age or older. The average household size was 2.49 and the average family size was 3.02.

In the town, the population was spread out, with 24.0% under the age of 18, 6.9% from 18 to 24, 28.5% from 25 to 44, 23.8% from 45 to 64, and 16.8% who were 65 years of age or older. The median age was 39 years. For every 100 females, there were 95.6 males. For every 100 females age 18 and over, there were 92.3 males.

The median income for a household in the town was $40,580, and the median income for a family was $50,255. Males had a median income of $34,306 versus $24,011 for females. The per capita income for the town was $18,447. About 2.9% of families and 4.2% of the population were below the poverty line, including 3.3% of those under age 18 and 6.1% of those age 65 or over.

== Communities and locations in Newstead ==
- Akron – Village located on NY-93, north of NY-5.
- Akron Airport (9G3) – A general aviation airport on the hilltop east of Akron village.
- Akron Falls County Park – Located within the village of Akron, along the banks of Murder Creek. The park provides picnicking, walking trails, and some sports fields.
- Akron Junction – A former location where a defunct railroad line branched. This location is on a hiking/bicycle trail north of Leisurewood Recreational Community.
- Falkirk – A previous community in Newstead, now absorbed into Akron village.
- Hawkins Corners – A location now of historical interest only, south of Akron.
- Leisurewood Recreational Community – A large seasonal community composed of trailers and recreational vehicles, occupied primarily during the summer months. It is southwest of Akron.
- Murder Creek – A tributary of Tonawanda Creek that flows through the town. The name stems from when an Indian man was killed there.
- Murrays Corner – A hamlet on NY-5 by the intersection of Crittenden Road, southeast of Akron village.
- Sand Hill – A small hamlet in the northwest part of the town, consisting of a few residences and a church. The hamlet is by the intersection of Rapids and Crego roads.
- South Newstead – A location near the border with the town of Alden at the junction of South Newstead and Buckwheat roads. Residences and farms are scattered through the area. Formerly, a post office was located in this area.
- Swifts Mills – A location of historical interest in the north part of the town, located on Murder Creek.
- Tonawanda Reservation – A small inhabited part of this Indian reservation is in the eastern part of the town. Several retail establishments sell discount cigarettes and untaxed gasoline.

== Recreation ==
Newstead and the town of Clarence have constructed several miles of biking and jogging trails that link the towns on a former railroad right-of-way. The Octagon House in the village of Akron is open to visitors who wish to examine this architectural style.

Newstead, because of its vast expanses of open space, has become a popular place for golf course construction.

== Notable people ==
- Jack Davis, industrialist
- Charles F. Tabor, former New York State Attorney General
