= Elizabethtown, Herkimer County, New York =

Elizabethtown, New York
- Hamlet
- Location within New York Location within the United States
- Coordinates: 42°57′58″N 75°04′45″W
- Country: United States
- State: New York
- County: Herkimer
- Town: Columbia
- Elevation: 1,280 ft (390 m)
- Time zone: UTC-5 (Eastern (EST))
  - Summer (DST): UTC-4 (EDT)
- Area codes: 315/680

Elizabethtown is a hamlet located in the Town of Columbia in Herkimer County, New York, United States.
