= Murrays Corner, New York =

Hamlet in New York, United States

Coordinates: 42°59′55″N 78°28′39″W

Murrays Corner is a hamlet in the town of Newstead in Erie County, New York, United States.
