= Akron Junction, New York =

Hamlet in the state of New York, United States

- hamlet
- Location in New York Akron Junction (the United States)
- Coordinates: 43°0′17.21″N 78°32′4.09″W
- Country: United States
- State: New York
- County: Erie
- Town: Newstead
- Elevation: 689 ft (210 m)
- Time zone: UTC-5 (Eastern (EST))
  - Summer (DST): UTC-4 (EDT)
- ZIP code: 14001
- Area code: 716
- GNIS feature ID: 972153

Akron Junction is a hamlet in the town of Newstead in Erie County, New York, United States.
