= Kingdom, New York =

- Hamlet
- Location within New York Location within the United States
- Coordinates: 42°55′44″N 74°58′33″W
- Country: United States
- State: New York
- County: Herkimer
- Towns: Columbia, Warren
- Elevation: 1,594 ft (486 m)
- Time zone: UTC-5 (Eastern (EST))
  - Summer (DST): UTC-4 (EDT)
- Area codes: 315/680

Kingdom is a hamlet located in the towns of Columbia and Warren in Herkimer County, New York, United States.
