= Spafford Valley, New York =

Hamlet in New York, United States

Spafford Valley
- hamlet
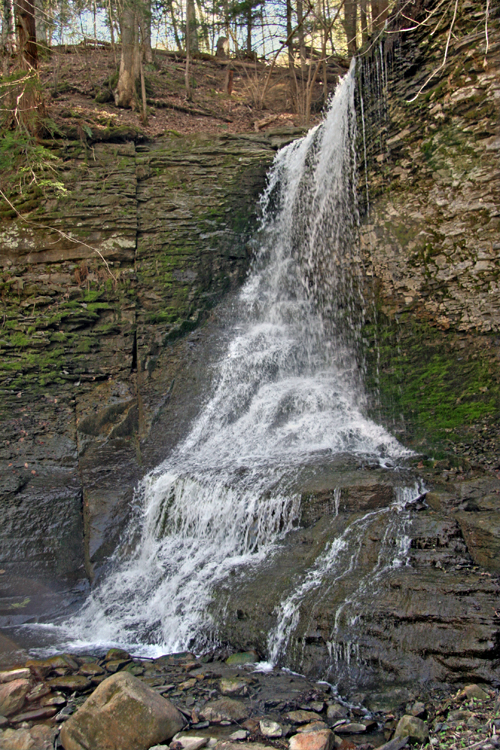
- Bucktail Falls, Spafford Valley
- Interactive map of Spafford Valley
- Coordinates: 42°49′30.24″N 76°14′42.75″W
- Country: United States
- State: New York
- County: Onondaga County

Spafford Valley is a hamlet in Onondaga County, New York, United States, in the Otisco Valley south of Otisco Lake. The hamlet is noted for "The Bucktail," a picturesque gorge with waterfalls.
