= South Jamesport, New York =

- Hamlet
- Location within New York Location within the United States
- Coordinates: 40°56′11″N 72°34′38″W
- Country: United States
- State: New York
- County: Suffolk
- Elevation: 3 ft (0.91 m)
- Time zone: UTC-5 (Eastern (EST))
  - Summer (DST): UTC-4 (EDT)
- ZIP code: 11970
- Area codes: 631 & 934
- GNIS feature ID: 965793

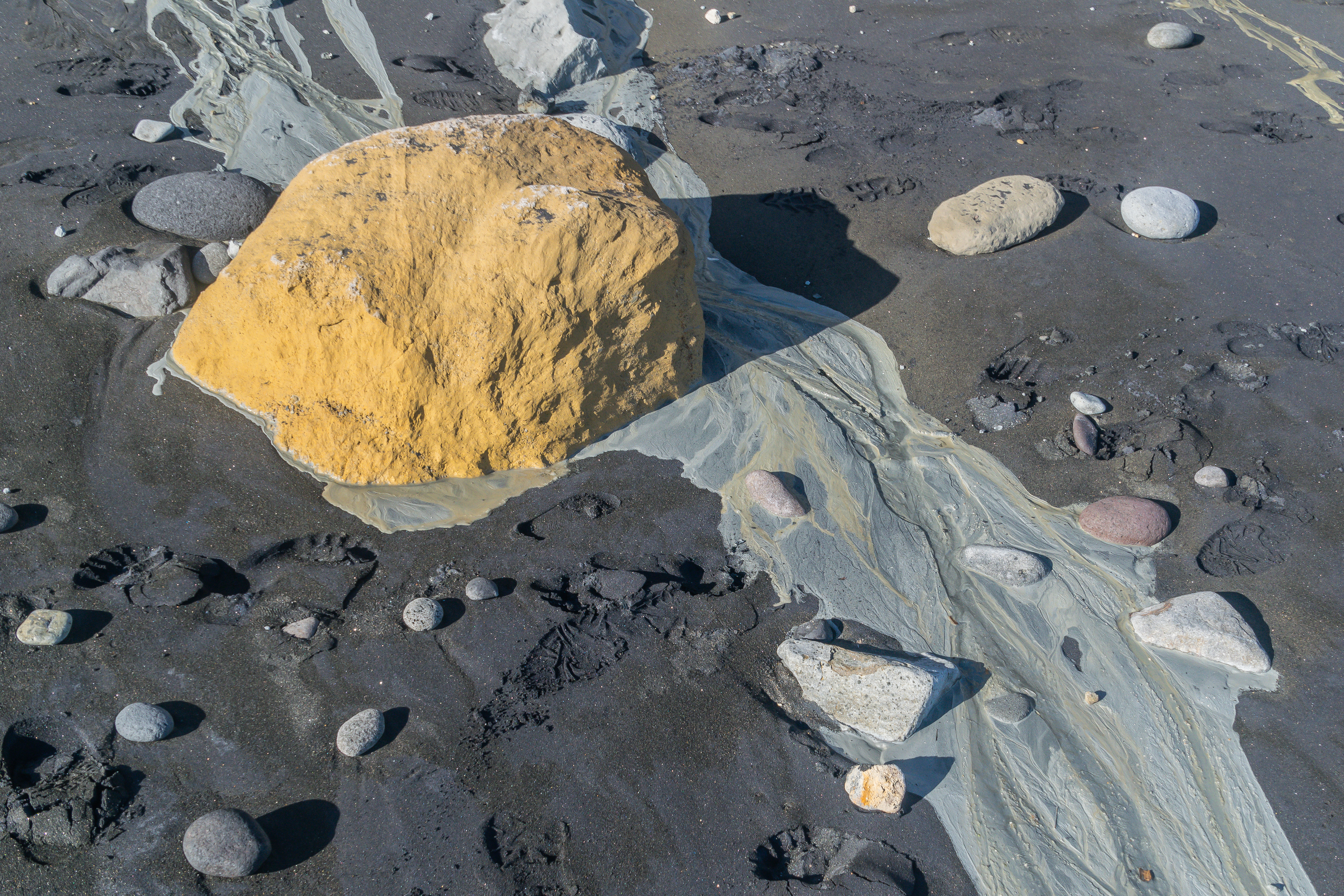

South Jamesport is a hamlet in the town of Riverhead, Suffolk County, New York, United States. The community is located on the north shore of the Great Peconic Bay. South Jamesport has a post office with ZIP code 11970, which opened on February 2, 1893. On South Jamesport beach there are different types of sand, black sand and golden sand.
