= South Centerville, New York =

Hamlet in Orange County, New York

South Centerville
- Hamlet
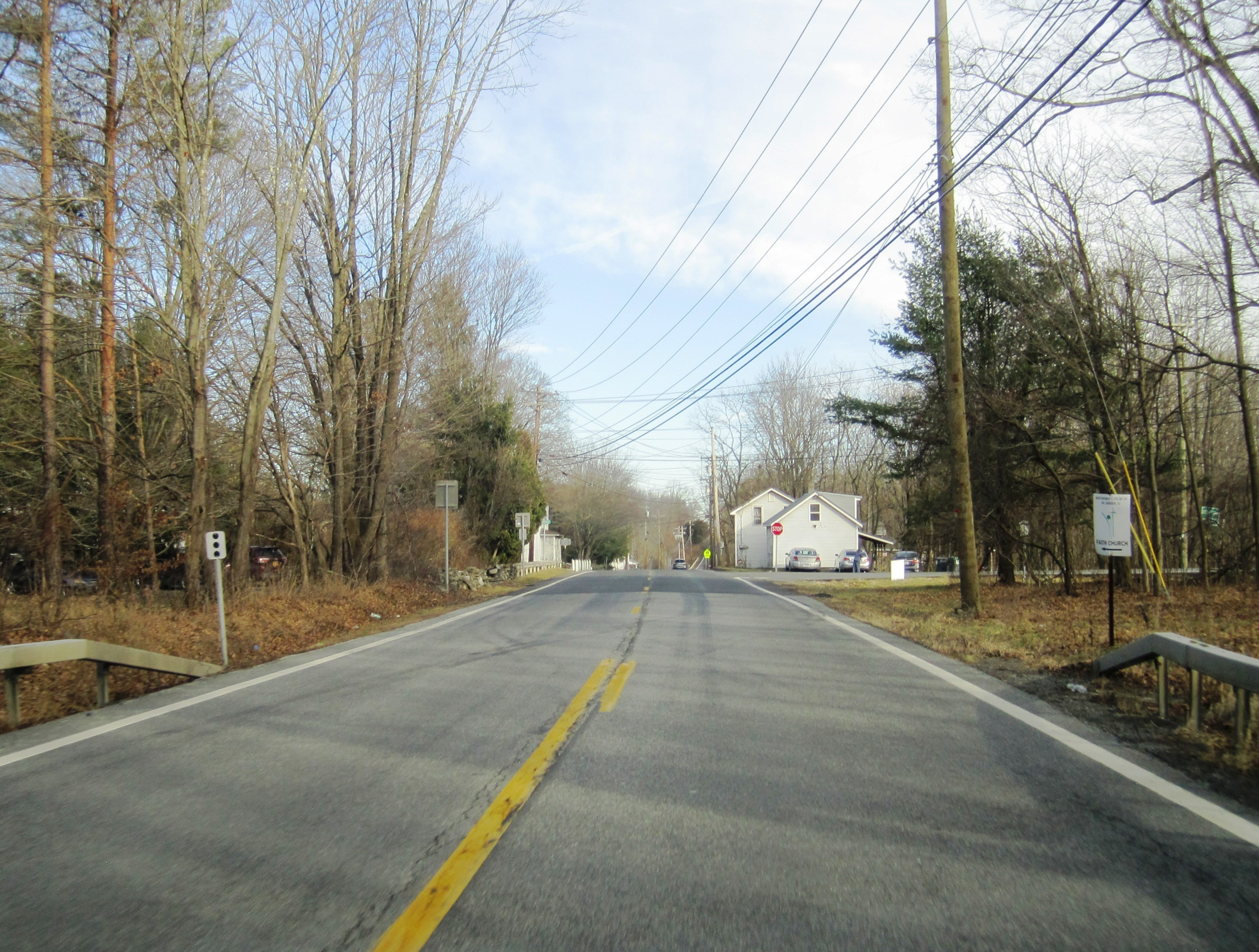
- South Centerville, looking east along US 6.

- Location within New York
- Country: United States
- State: New York
- County: Orange
- Time zone: UTC-5 (Eastern (EST))
  - Summer (DST): UTC-4 (EDT)
- ZIP Code: 10940

South Centerville is a hamlet in the town of Wawayanda, Orange County, in the U.S. state of New York.

== History ==
Variant names were "Centerville" and "South Centreville". A post office called South Centreville was established in 1879, the name was changed to South Centerville in 1893, and the post office closed in 1917. The community was named from its location near the geographical center of Minisink.

South Centerville was featured in a 1997 episode of Late Night with Conan O'Brien, consisting of Conan O'Brien and Andy Richter traveling the town, meeting local residents, and planting a flag with the show's logo.
