= Sunset Beach, New York =

- hamlet
- Location within the state of New York
- Coordinates: 43°18′55″N 78°50′35″W
- Country: United States
- State: New York
- County: Niagara
- Elevation: 344 ft (105 m)
- Time zone: UTC-5 (Eastern (EST))
  - Summer (DST): UTC-4 (EDT)
- ZIP code: 14172
- Area code: 716

Sunset Beach is a hamlet in the town of Wilson in Niagara County, New York, United States. It sits along the shores of Lake Ontario and is part of a region with several other small lakeside communities.
