= South Spafford, New York =

Coordinates: 42°46′46″N 76°13′05″W

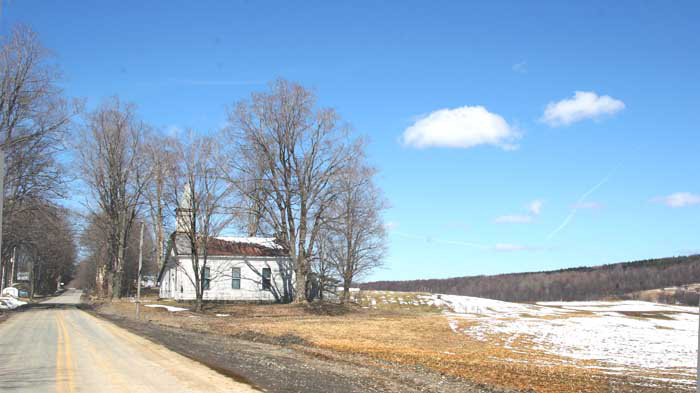
{{South Spafford looking north on Coldbrook Road.

South Spafford is an abandoned hamlet in New York, five miles northwest of Preble, New York. The last service in the village's church was held in October 1996 by Rev R. Bob Teachout. The place is most notable for its scenic situation in the high, remote Coldbrook Valley of the Town of Spafford.
