= Sodom, New York =

Hamlet in New York, United States

- Hamlet
- Interactive map of Sodom, New York
- Coordinates: 41°24′7.34″N 73°35′28.46″W
- Country: United States
- U.S. state: New York
- County: Putnam
- Town: Southeast

Sodom is a hamlet in Putnam County, in the U.S. state of New York.

According to one account, the hamlet was so named on account of the rowdy character of its first inhabitants. A variant name was "Southeast Center", also spelled "South East Centre".

== Gallery ==
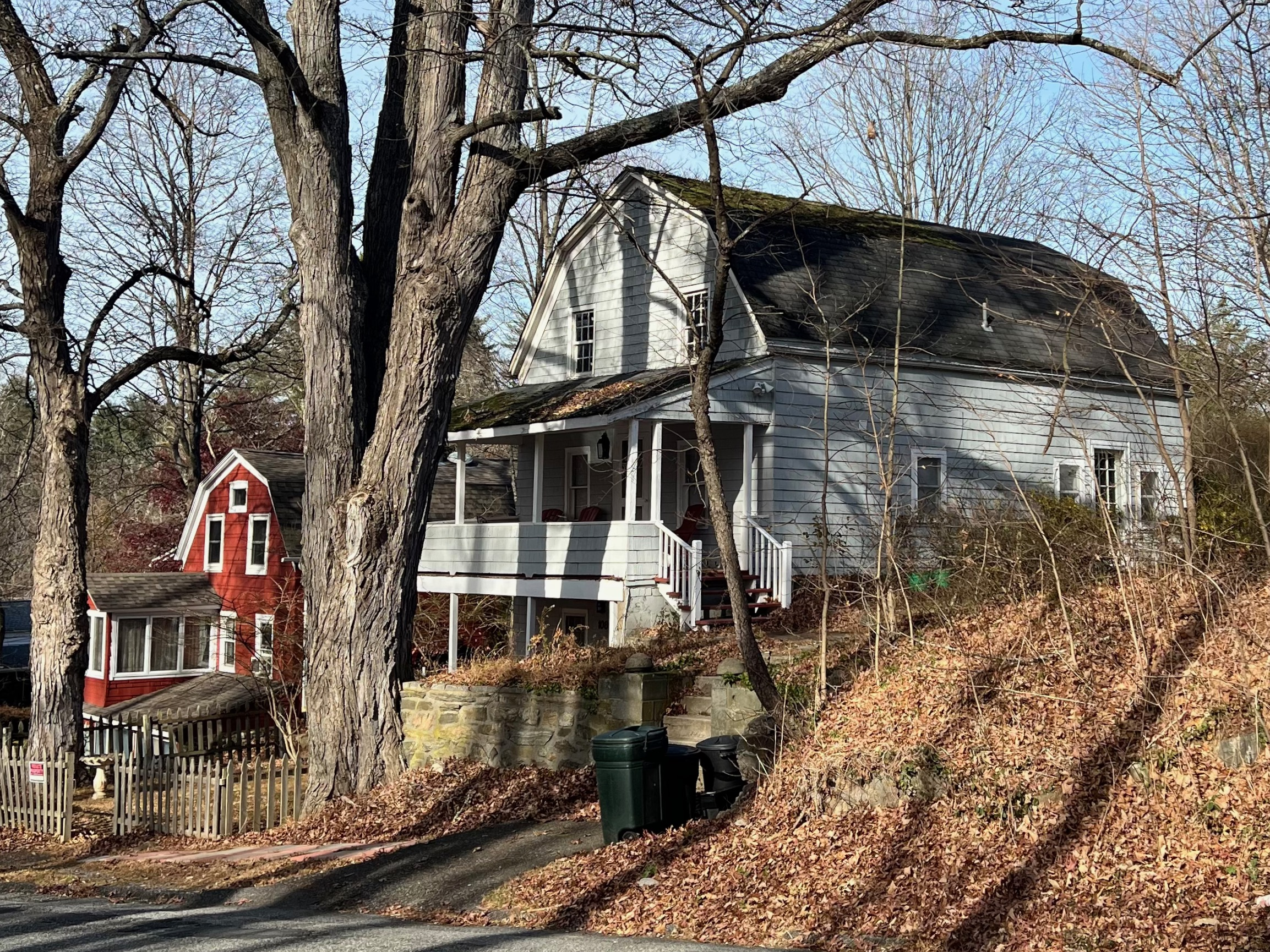

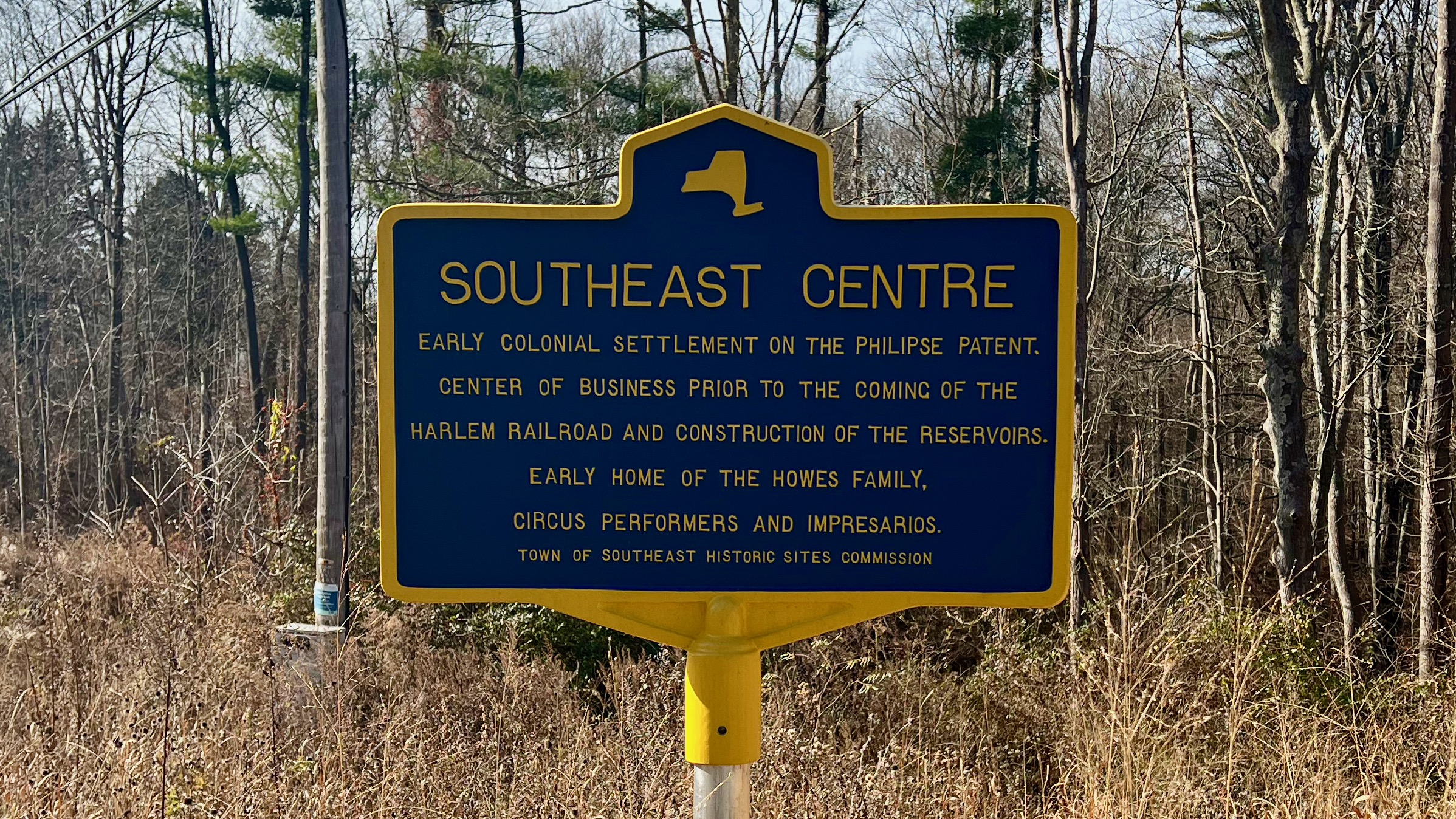

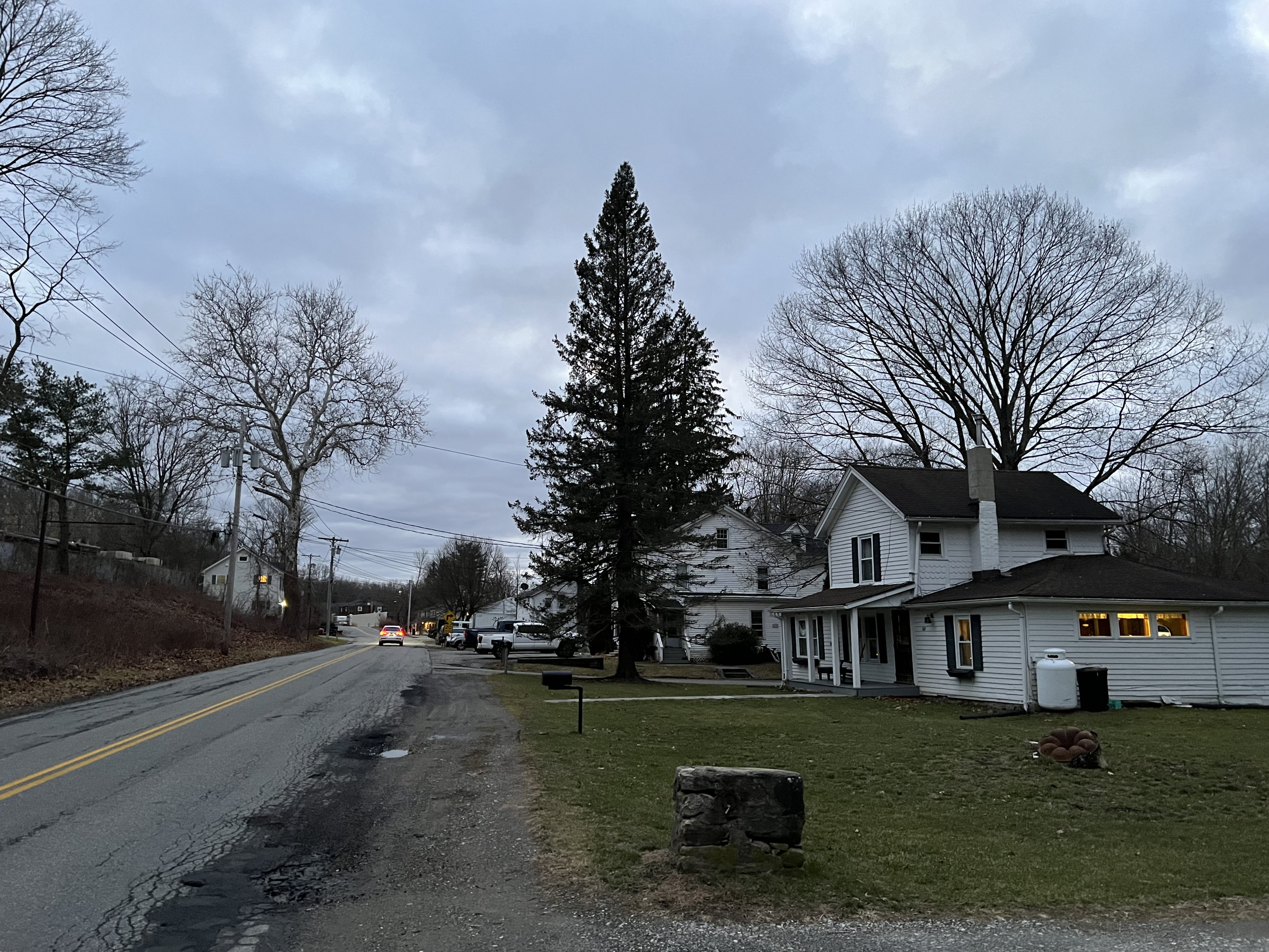
