= South Newstead, New York =

Hamlet in New York, United States

Coordinates: 42°57′44″N 78°30′47″W

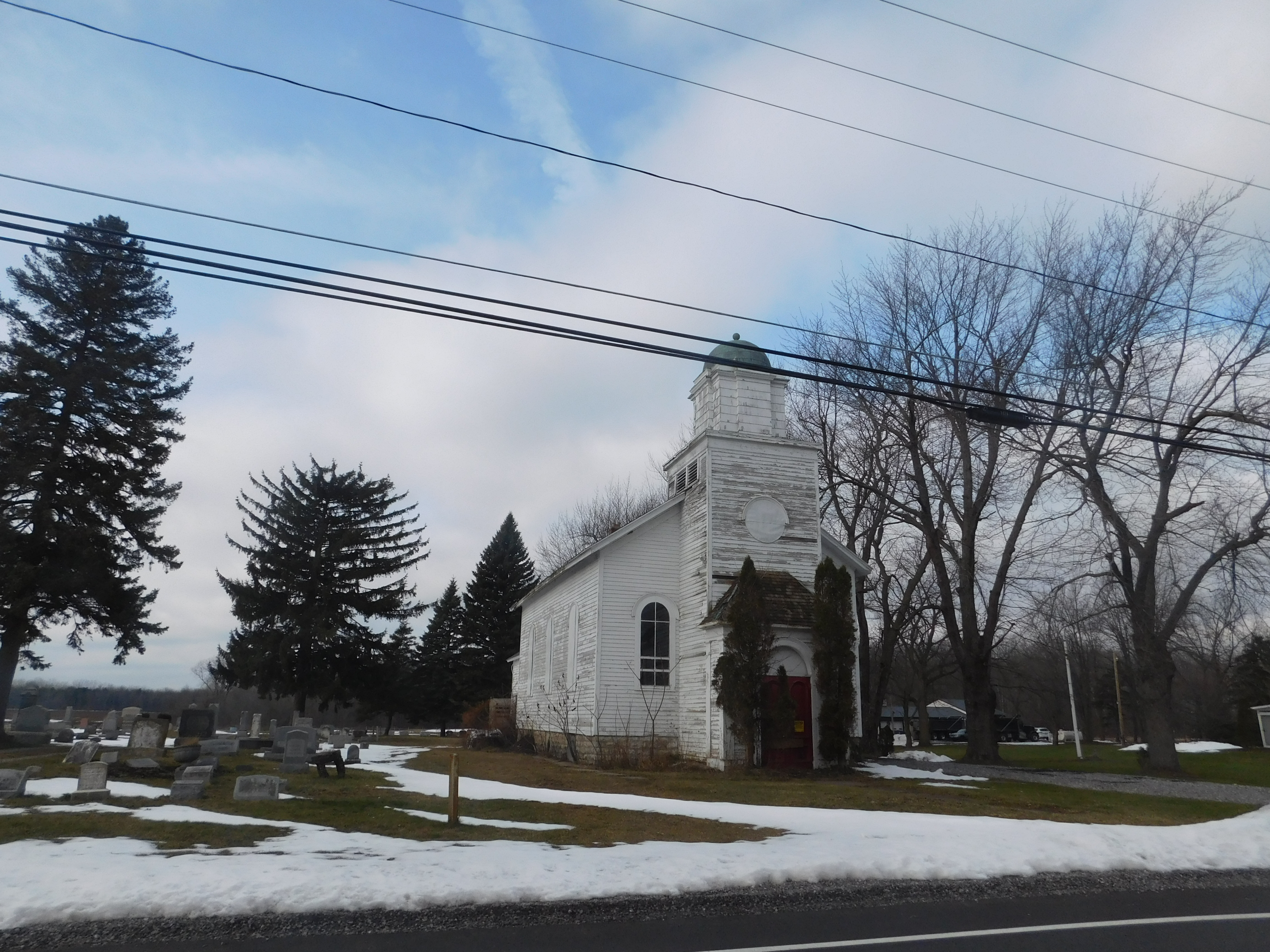
An abandoned church in South Newstead

South Newstead is a hamlet in the town of Newstead in Erie County, New York, United States.
