= Spafford Forest =

Nature reserve in New York, U.S.

Coordinates: 42.7923319°N 76.2210263°W

Spafford Forest is a 701-acre (284 ha) preserve managed by Onondaga County, New York, that provides trails for hiking and dirt biking. It is close to Ripley Hill.

The initial 508 acres (206 ha) of Spafford Forest were purchased by the county from 1952 to 1960. In 1975, the county approved the purchase of another 215 acres (87 ha).
