= Saint Andrew, New York =

Hamlet in Orange County

Coordinates: 41°34′09″N 74°08′44″W

Saint Andrew is a hamlet in Orange County, in the U.S. state of New York.

== History ==
The hamlet of St. Andrew's was founded in the 18th century on land belonging to Henry Wileman's land patent of 3,000 acres and took its name from the St. Andrew's Episcopal Congregation and Church.

The congregation of St. Andrew's existed as early as 1733 and had erected a small log church at the fork in the road now leading from St. Andrew's to Shawangunk and Wal- den. After incorporating in 1770, the congregation constructed a new church "what was considered a very fine edifice" approximately one mile east of the former log church in what would later become the hamlet of St. Andrew's. Ten acres of land for the church, parsonage, and grounds, along with a 240-acre farm, were donated by Peter Dubois and Richard Bradley.

At the beginning of the French and Indian War, an Indian massacre took place in St. Andrews, in which seventeen Indians were killed. During the Revolutionary War, a company of soldiers camped during the winter of 1782 in an area west of the village.

In 1806, "several gun-barrels, and an old wrought hand-grenade, with other warlike implements" were discovered in the cellar of a brick farmhouse nearby, which had decayed due to the removal of lead from the pediment and roof for the casting of musket balls.

A post office called Saint Andrew's was established in 1830, the name changed to Saint Andrew in 1892, and the post office closed in 1903.

Official variant spellings have been "Saint Andrew's" and "Saint Andrews".
