= Sawyer, New York =

Hamlet in New York, United States

Coordinates: 43°03′53″N 78°50′41″W

Sawyer is a hamlet in the town of Wheatfield in Niagara County, New York, United States.
