= North Columbia Academy =

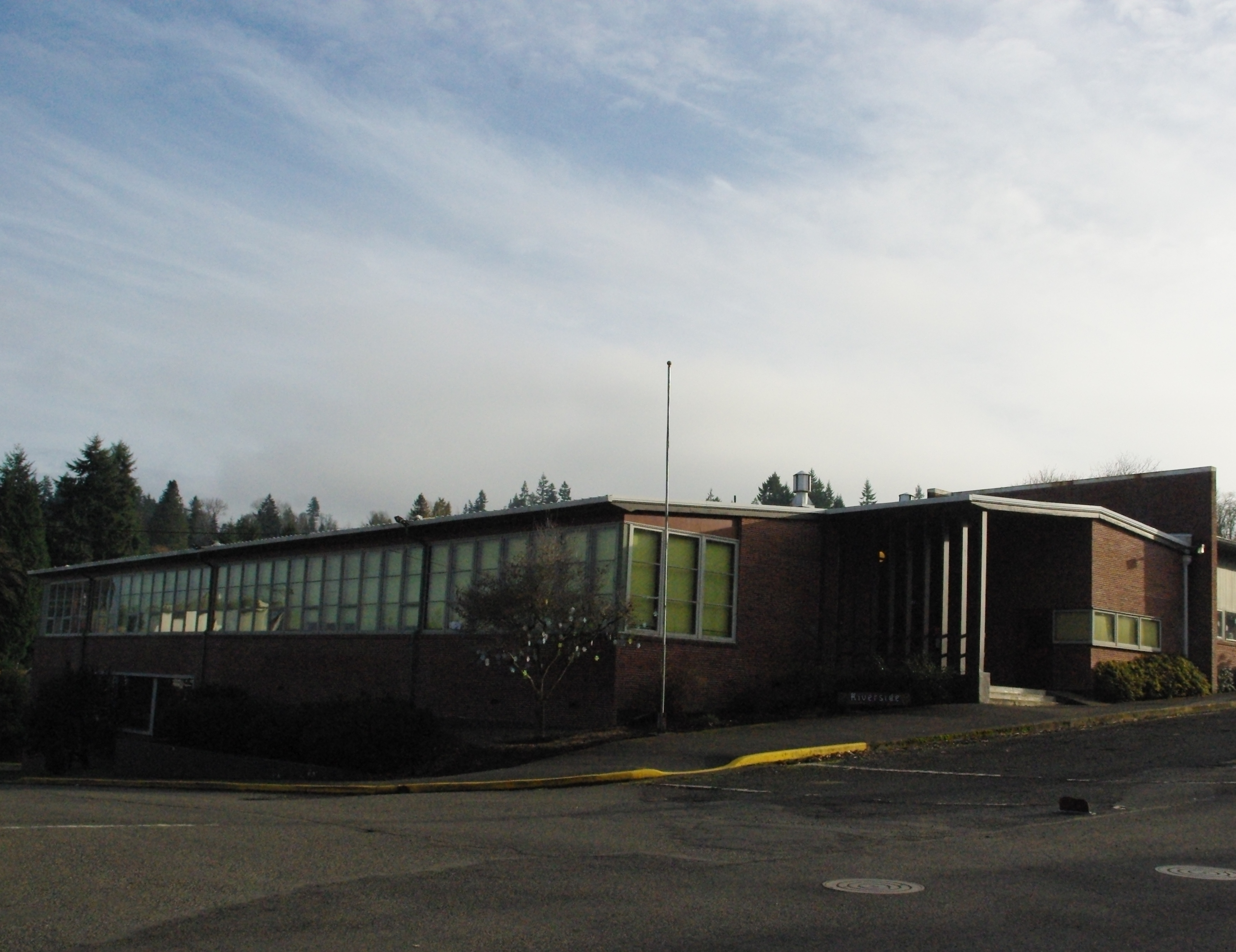

Location
- 305 3rd West, Room 14; Rainier, (Columbia County), Oregon 97048; United States
- Coordinates: 46.088496°N 122.93919°W

Information
- Type: Public
- School district: Rainier School District
- Principal: R. Michael Carter
- Grades: 9-12
- Enrollment: 29
- Website: North Columbia Academy website

North Columbia Academy is a public charter school in Rainier, Oregon, United States.

== Academics ==
In 2008, 40% of the school's seniors received a high school diploma. Of five students, two graduated, two dropped out, and one was still in high school the following year.
