= Swifts Mills, New York =

Hamlet in New York, United States

Coordinates: 43°03′35″N 78°31′06″W

Swifts Mills is a hamlet in the town of Newstead in Erie County, New York, United States.
