= Sand Hill, New York =

Hamlet in New York, United States

Coordinates: 43°03′32″N 78°33′29″W

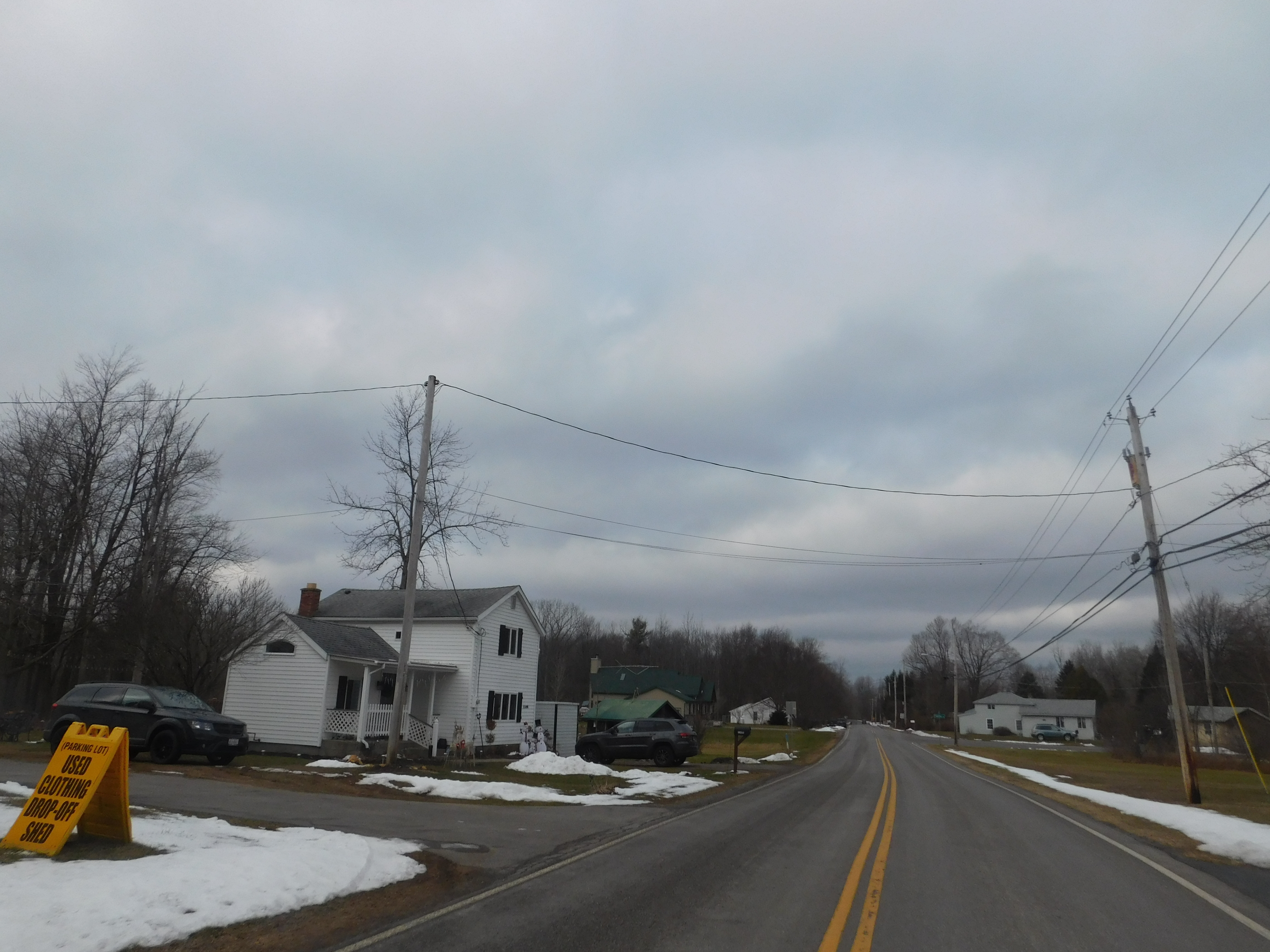
Sand Hill in January 2021

Sand Hill is a hamlet in the town of Newstead in Erie County, New York, United States.
