= Otisco Lake =

Lake in Central New York, United States

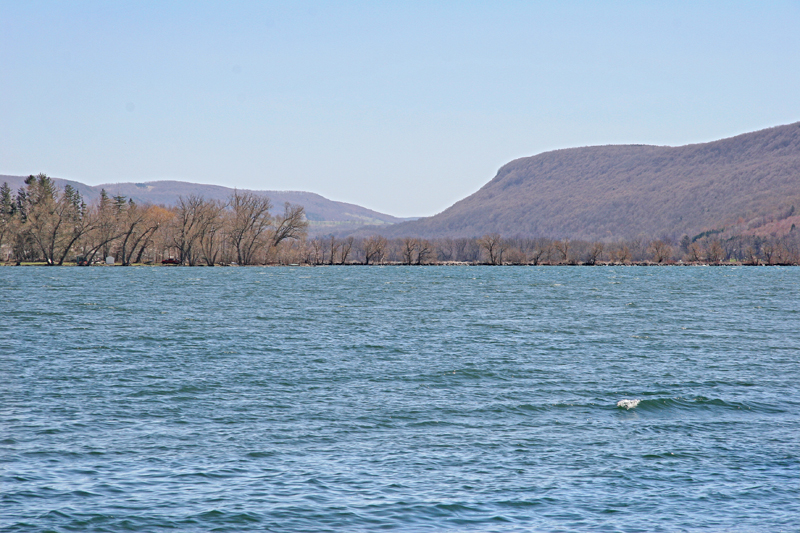
- Otisco Lake, looking south

- Location within New York Otisco Lake (the United States)
- Location: Onondaga County, New York, United States
- Group: Finger Lakes
- Coordinates: 42°51′52″N 76°17′13″W
- Type: Ground moraine
- Primary outflows: Ninemile Creek
- Catchment area: 38.7 sq mi (100 km^{2})
- Basin countries: United States
- Max. length: 5.4 mi (8.7 km)
- Max. width: 0.75 mi (1.21 km)
- Surface area: 2,048 acres (8.29 km^{2})
- Average depth: 33 ft (10 m)
- Max. depth: 66 ft (20 m)
- Water volume: .0191 cu mi (0.080 km^{3})
- Residence time: 1.7 years
- Shore length^{1}: 15.5 mi (24.9 km)
- Surface elevation: 785 ft (239 m)
- ^{1} Shore length is not a well-defined measure.

The eleven Finger Lakes of New York State.

Otisco Lake is a Finger Lake in Onondaga County in central New York state. One of two in the county, it is the easternmost of the chain, and fourth smallest. The 2,048-acre (8.29 km^{2}) lake is located southwest of the city of Syracuse.

== History ==
Otisco Lake's name may have been derived from the Iroquois name for the lake's outlet, Nine Mile Creek, Us-te-ke, meaning "bitter-nut-hickory". At least one older map, published in 1825, has the name spelled as "Ostisco". The name may also have been derived from the word ostickney, meaning "waters much dried away", or from the Onondaga word ostick, meaning "the water is low".

Prior to European settlement, the lake was used by the Onondaga people for seasonal fishing and hunting, however no permanent settlements were known to exist. After the Revolutionary War, lands surrounding Otisco Lake were given to soldiers as payment for their service in the war. The first house was erected near the head of Otisco Lake by Oliver Tuttle in 1804, in what is today the Town of Otisco.

In 1869, Otisco Lake was made larger with the construction of a dam near the lake's outlet, which enabled the lake to be used as a reservoir for the Erie Canal. The dam's construction raised lake levels by nine feet (2.7 m), and flooded a road at the southern end of the lake. To re-build the road, a causeway was built out of hemlock logs. The causeway was damaged by storms and allowed to deteriorate before being reconstructed in 1983.

Otisco Lake has been used as a source for public drinking water for residents in the southern and western half of Onondaga County since 1908. In 1909, lake levels were increased by an additional four feet (1.2 m) when the dam was raised to increase the lake's capacity. Today, the lake's use as a public water supply is managed by the Onondaga County Water Authority. In 2011, Otisco Lake provided 17,280,000 US gallons (65,400,000 L) of water per day.

== Description ==
Otisco Lake is approximately 5.4 miles (8.7 km) long and 0.75 miles (1.21 km) wide at its widest point. The lake has an average depth of 33 feet (10 m) and reaches a maximum depth of 66 feet (20 m). It has a surface area of 2,048 acres (8.29 km^{2}) and can hold 21 billion US gallons (79,000,000 m^{3}) of water. The lake's outflow enters first Onondaga Lake via Ninemile Creek and then Lake Ontario via the Seneca and Oswego rivers.

Otisco Lake is located entirely within Onondaga County and is bordered by the towns of Marcellus, Otisco, and Spafford. Its watershed covers 38.7 square miles (100 km^{2}) of primarily rural land. Forty-two percent of the watershed is agricultural, 33% is forested and 9% is shrubland. Wetlands and open water account for approximately 13% of the watershed. Nearly half of the homes within the lake's watershed are located on or near the lake's shore.

According to the U.S. Environmental Protection Agency, Otisco Lake is affected by nonpoint source pollution from agriculture, residential land use and streambank erosion. Pollution from these sources includes pesticides and fertilizers, sedimentation from erosion and poor tillage practices, and runoff from septic systems, lawns and construction sites. Currently the lake is experiencing severe problems brought on by zebra mussels which were introduced to the lake water via boaters.

== Recreation ==
The closest Finger Lake to the City of Syracuse, Otisco is a popular recreational destination in the summer. A fishing derby is held on the first day of bass season, usually around the end of the second week in June.

A county park and a public boat launch are available, and two private boat launches are located along the southeastern portion of the lake.
