= List of places in New York: N =

This list of current cities, towns, unincorporated communities, counties, and other recognized places in the U.S. state of New York also includes information on the number and names of counties in which the place lies, and its lower and upper zip code bounds, if applicable.

List of places in New York: A | B | C | D | E | F | G | H | I | J | K | L | M | N | O | P | Q | R | S | T | U | V | W | X | Y | Z

Name of place	Counties	Principal county	Lower zip code	Upper zip code
Nanticoke	1	Broome County	13802	
Nanuet	1	Rockland County	10954	
Napanoch	1	Ulster County	12458	
Napeague	1	Suffolk County	11930	
Naples	1	Ontario County	14512	
Napoli	1	Cattaraugus County	14755	
Narrowsburg	1	Sullivan County	12764	
Nashville	1	Chautauqua County	14062	
Nashville	1	Niagara County		
Nassau	1	Rensselaer County	12123	
Nassau	1	Richmond County		
Nassau Boulevard	1	Nassau County		
Nassau Farms	1	Suffolk County	11935	
Nassau Lake	1	Rensselaer County		
Nassau Point	1	Suffolk County	11935	
Nassau Shores	1	Nassau County	11758	
Natural Bridge	1	Jefferson County	13665	
Natural Bridge	1	Lewis County		
Natural Dam	1	St. Lawrence County	13642	
Naumburg	1	Lewis County	13620	
Nauraushaun	1	Rockland County	10965	
Navarino	1	Onondaga County	13108	
Nazareth University	1	Monroe County	14610	
Nedrow	1	Onondaga County	13120	
Neelytown	1	Orange County		
Nehasane	1	Hamilton County		
Nelliston	1	Montgomery County	13410	
Nelson	1	Madison County	13035	
Nelson Corners	1	Putnam County		
Nelsonville	1	Putnam County	10516	
Nepera Park	1	Westchester County		
Neponsit	1	Queens County	11694	
Nepperhan	1	Westchester County		
Nesconset	1	Suffolk County	11767	
Netherwood	1	Dutchess County		
Neversink	1	Sullivan County	12765	
Nevis	1	Columbia County	12583	
New Albion	1	Cattaraugus County	14719	
Newark	1	Wayne County	14513	
Newark Valley	1	Tioga County	13811	
New Baltimore	1	Greene County	12124	
New Berlin	1	Chenango County	13411	
New Berlin Junction	1	Chenango County	13733	
New Boston	1	Cortland County		
New Boston	1	Lewis County	13626	
New Bremen	1	Lewis County	13367	
Newbridge	1	St. Lawrence County		
New Brighton	1	Richmond County	10310	
New Britain	1	Columbia County		
Newburg	1	Wyoming County	14550	
Newburgh	1	Orange County	12550	
Newburgh Junction	1	Orange County		
Newburgh West	1	Orange County		
New Campbellwood Wye	1	Lewis County		
New Cassel	1	Nassau County	11590	
New Castle	1	Westchester County		
New Centerville	1	Oswego County	13142	
New City	1	Rockland County	10956	
New City Junction	1	Rockland County		
New City Park	1	Rockland County	10956	
Newcomb	1	Essex County	12879	
New Concord	1	Columbia County	12060	
New Connecticut	1	Tioga County		
New Dorp	1	Richmond County	10306	
New Dorp Beach	1	Richmond County	10306	
New Ebenezer	1	Erie County	14224	
New Falconwood	1	Erie County	14072	
Newfane	1	Niagara County	14108	
Newfield	1	Tompkins County	14867	
Newfield Hamlet	1	Tompkins County		
New Forge	1	Columbia County		
New Hackensack	1	Dutchess County	12590	
New Hamburg	1	Dutchess County	12590	
New Hampton	1	Orange County	10958	
New Hampton-Denton	1	Orange County		
New Hartford	1	Oneida County	13413	
New Haven	1	Oswego County	13121	
New Hempstead	1	Rockland County	10977	
New Hope	1	Cayuga County	13118	
New Hudson	1	Allegany County		
New Hurley	1	Ulster County	12525	
New Hyde Park	1	Nassau County	11040	
Newieden	1	Sullivan County		
New Ireland	1	Broome County	13905	
New Kingston	1	Delaware County	12459	
Newkirk	1	Fulton County		
Newkirk	1	Kings County	11226	
New Lebanon	1	Columbia County	12125	
New Lebanon Center	1	Columbia County	12125	
New Lisbon	1	Otsego County	13415	
New London	1	Oneida County		
New Lots	1	Kings County	11208	
Newmans Corner	1	Broome County		
New Market	1	Niagara County	14301	
New Milford	1	Orange County	10959	
New Ohio	1	Broome County		
New Oregon	1	Erie County	14057	
New Paltz	1	Ulster County	12561	
Newport	1	Herkimer County	13416	
Newport	1	Monroe County	14617	
Newport	1	Onondaga County	13164	
Newport	1	Orange County		
New Rochelle	1	Westchester County	10801	05
New Russia	1	Essex County	12964	
Newrys	1	Greene County		
New Salem	1	Albany County	12186	
New Salem	1	Ulster County	12401	
New Scotland	1	Albany County	12127	
New Scriba	1	Oswego County		
Newsday	1	Suffolk County	11747	
New Springville	1	Richmond County	10313	
New Square	1	Rockland County	10977	
Newstead	1	Erie County		
New Suffolk	1	Suffolk County	11956	
Newton Falls	1	St. Lawrence County	13666	
Newton Hook	1	Columbia County	12173	
Newtonville	1	Albany County	12128	
Newtown	1	Erie County		
Newtown	1	Saratoga County		
Newtown	1	Suffolk County	11946	
New Utrecht	1	Kings County		
New Vernon	1	Orange County	10940	
Newville	1	Herkimer County	13365	
New Windsor	1	Orange County	12553	
New Windsor Center	1	Orange County		
New Woodstock	1	Madison County	13122	
New York City	5	Bronx County	10000	99
New York City	5	Kings County	10000	99
New York City	5	New York County	10000	99
New York City	5	Queens County	10000	99
New York City	5	Richmond County	10000	99
New York Mills	1	Oneida County	13417	
New York Mills Gardens	1	Oneida County	13492	
Niagara	1	Niagara County		
Niagara Falls	1	Niagara County	14301	05
Niagara Falls International Airport	1	Niagara County	14304	
Niagara Junction	1	Erie County		
Niagara Square	1	Erie County	14201	
Niagara Town	1	Niagara County		
Niagara University	1	Niagara County	14109	
Nichols	1	Steuben County	16920	
Nichols	1	Tioga County	13812	
Nichols Corners	1	Onondaga County		
Nichols Run	1	Cattaraugus County		
Nichols Siding	1	Queens County		
Nicholsville	1	Oswego County		
Nicholville	1	St. Lawrence County	12965	
Niets Crest	1	Chautauqua County	14710	
Nile	1	Allegany County	14739	
Niles	1	Cayuga County	13152	
Nimmonsburg	1	Broome County	13901	
Ninety Six Corners	1	Oneida County		
Nineveh	1	Broome County	13813	
Nineveh Junction	1	Chenango County	13730	
Niobe	1	Chautauqua County	14758	
Niskayuna	1	Schenectady County	12309	
Nissequogue	1	Suffolk County	11780	
Niverville	1	Columbia County	12130	
Nobleboro	1	Herkimer County	13324	
Noble Shores	1	Oswego County		
Norfolk	1	St. Lawrence County	13667	
Norfolk Center	1	St. Lawrence County		
Normansville	1	Albany County	12054	
Norrie Heights	1	Dutchess County	12580	
North	1	Westchester County	10703	
North Afton	1	Chenango County	13730	
North Alexander	1	Genesee County		
North Almond	1	Allegany County		
North Amboy	1	Oswego County		
North Amityville	1	Suffolk County	11701	
Northampton	1	Fulton County		
Northampton	1	Suffolk County	11901	
North Argyle	1	Washington County	12809	
North Avon	1	Livingston County		
North Babylon	1	Suffolk County	11703	
North Bailey	1	Erie County	14226	
North Baldwin	1	Nassau County	11510	
North Ballston Spa	1	Saratoga County		
North Bangor	1	Franklin County	12966	
North Barton	1	Tioga County		
North Bay	1	Oneida County	13123	
North Bay Shore	1	Suffolk County	11706	
North Beach	1	Queens County	11369	
North Belle Isle	1	Onondaga County		
North Bellmore	1	Nassau County	11710	
North Bellport	1	Suffolk County	11713	
North Bergen	1	Genesee County	14416	
North Bethlehem	1	Albany County	12208	
North Blenheim	1	Schoharie County	12131	
North Bloomfield	1	Ontario County	14472	
North Bolton	1	Warren County		
North Boston	1	Erie County	14110	
North Boylston	1	Oswego County		
North Branch	1	Sullivan County	12766	
North Bridgewater	1	Oneida County	13318	
North Broadalbin	1	Fulton County	12025	
North Brookfield	1	Madison County	13418	
North Burke	1	Franklin County	12917	
North Bush	1	Fulton County	12095	
North Cambridge	1	Washington County		
North Cameron	1	Steuben County	14819	
North Castle	1	Westchester County		
North Cazenovia	1	Madison County	13035	
North Chatham	1	Columbia County	12132	
North Chemung	1	Chemung County	14861	
North Chili	1	Monroe County	14514	
North Chittenango	1	Madison County	13037	
North Clove	1	Dutchess County		
North Clymer	1	Chautauqua County	14759	
North Cohocton	1	Steuben County	14868	
North Colesville	1	Broome County		
North Collins	1	Erie County	14111	
North Columbia	1	Herkimer County	13357	
North Constantia	1	Oswego County		
North Corners	1	St. Lawrence County	13658	
North Creek	1	Warren County	12853	
North Croghan	1	Jefferson County		
North Cuba	1	Allegany County	14727	
North Dansville	1	Livingston County		
North Darien	1	Genesee County	14036	
North Dock	1	Orange County		
North East	1	Dutchess County		
Northeast Center	1	Dutchess County	12546	
Northeast Henrietta	1	Monroe County	14534	
Northeast Ithaca	1	Tompkins County	14850	
North East Junction	1	Chautauqua County		
North Easton	1	Washington County	12834	
North Edmeston	1	Otsego County		
North Elba	1	Essex County		
North End	1	Orange County	10940	
North Evans	1	Erie County	14112	
North Fair Haven	1	Cayuga County	13064	
North Fenton	1	Broome County	13746	
Northfield	1	Delaware County	13856	
North Forest Acres	1	Erie County		
North Frankfort	1	Herkimer County		
North Franklin	1	Delaware County	13820	
North Gage	1	Oneida County	13502	
North Gainesville	1	Wyoming County	14550	
North Galway	1	Saratoga County		
North Gates	1	Monroe County		
North Germantown	1	Columbia County	12526	
North Gouverneur	1	St. Lawrence County		
North Granville	1	Washington County	12854	
North Great River	1	Suffolk County	11722	
North Greece	1	Monroe County	14515	
North Greenbush	1	Rensselaer County		
North Greenfield	1	Saratoga County		
North Greenwich	1	Washington County	12834	
North Hamlin	1	Monroe County		
North Hammond	1	St. Lawrence County		
North Hannibal	1	Oswego County	13126	
North Harmony	1	Chautauqua County		
North Harpersfield	1	Delaware County	12093	
North Hartland	1	Niagara County	14008	
North Haven	1	Suffolk County	11963	
North Hebron	1	Washington County	12832	
North Hempstead	1	Nassau County		
North Highland	1	Putnam County	10516	
North Hills	1	Nassau County	11040	
North Hillsdale	1	Columbia County	12529	
North Hoosick	1	Rensselaer County	12133	
North Hornell	1	Steuben County	14843	
North Hudson	1	Essex County	12855	
North Hudson Falls	1	Washington County		
North Huron	1	Wayne County		
North Ilion	1	Herkimer County	13340	
North Jasper	1	Steuben County	14819	
North Java	1	Wyoming County		
North Java	1	Wyoming County	14113	
North Jay	1	Essex County	12941	
North Kortright	1	Delaware County	13750	
North Lansing	1	Tompkins County	13073	
North Larchmont	1	Westchester County		
North Lawrence	1	St. Lawrence County	12967	
North Leroy	1	Genesee County		
North Lexington	1	Greene County		
North Lindenhurst	1	Suffolk County	11757	
North Litchfield	1	Herkimer County	13340	
North Lynbrook	1	Nassau County	11563	
North Macedon	1	Wayne County		
North Manlius	1	Onondaga County	13082	
North Massapequa	1	Nassau County	11758	
North Merrick	1	Nassau County	11566	
North Milton	1	Saratoga County		
North Nassau	1	Rensselaer County		
North New Hyde Park	1	Nassau County	11040	
North Norwich	1	Chenango County	13814	
North Norwich	1	Chenango County		
North Olean	1	Cattaraugus County	14760	
North Osceola	1	Lewis County		
North Patchogue	1	Suffolk County	11772	
North Pelham	1	Westchester County	10803	
North Pembroke	1	Genesee County	14020	
North Petersburg	1	Rensselaer County	12138	
North Pharsalia	1	Chenango County	13844	
North Pitcher	1	Chenango County	13124	
North Pole	1	Essex County	12946	
Northport	1	Suffolk County	11768	
Northport	1	Suffolk County		
North Port Byron	1	Cayuga County		
North Reading	1	Schuyler County		
North Ridge	1	Niagara County	14094	
North Ridgeway	1	Orleans County		
North River	1	Warren County	12856	
North Rockville Centre	1	Nassau County	11570	
North Rose	1	Wayne County	14516	
North Roslyn	1	Nassau County		
North Rush	1	Monroe County	14543	
North Russell	1	St. Lawrence County	13617	
North Salem	1	Westchester County	10560	
North Sanford	1	Broome County	13754	
North Schodack	1	Rensselaer County		
North Scriba	1	Oswego County		
North Sea	1	Suffolk County	11968	
North Seaford	1	Nassau County	11783	
North Settlement	1	Greene County	12496	
North Sheldon	1	Wyoming County		
North Shore Beach	1	Suffolk County	11778	
Northside	1	Steuben County	14830	
North Smithtown	1	Suffolk County	11787	
North Spencer	1	Tioga County	14883	
North Stephentown	1	Rensselaer County	12168	
North Sterling	1	Cayuga County		
North Stockholm	1	St. Lawrence County	13668	
North Syracuse	1	Onondaga County	13212	
North Tarrytown	1	Westchester County	10591	
North Thurston	1	Steuben County		
North Tonawanda	1	Niagara County	14120	
Northtown	1	Erie County	14226	
Northtown Plaza	1	Erie County		
Northumberland	1	Saratoga County	12871	
North Urbana	1	Steuben County		
North Valley Stream	1	Nassau County	11580	
North Victory	1	Cayuga County	13111	
Northville	1	Fulton County	12134	
Northville	1	Suffolk County	11901	
North Volney	1	Oswego County		
North Wantagh	1	Nassau County	11793	
North Waverly	1	Tioga County	14892	
North Weedsport	1	Cayuga County		
Northwest Corners	1	Chenango County		
North Western	1	Oneida County	13419	
Northwest Harbor	1	Suffolk County		
Northwest Ithaca	1	Tompkins County		
Northwest Landing	1	Suffolk County		
North White Plains	1	Westchester County	10603	
North Wilmurt	1	Herkimer County	13438	
North Wilna	1	Jefferson County		
North Winfield	1	Herkimer County	13491	
North Wolcott	1	Wayne County	14590	
Northwood	1	Herkimer County		
North Woodmere	1	Nassau County	11581	
Northwoods Club	1	Essex County		
North Yonkers	1	Westchester County		
Norton Hill	1	Greene County	12135	
Norton Summit	1	Allegany County		
Norway	1	Herkimer County	13416	
Norwich	1	Chenango County	13815	
Norwich Corners	1	Herkimer County	13456	
Norwood	1	St. Lawrence County	13668	
Noseville	1	Jefferson County		
Nostrand	1	Kings County	11235	
Nostrand Avenue	1	Kings County		
Nottingham Estates	1	Niagara County	14094	
Noxon	1	Dutchess County		
Noyack	1	Suffolk County	11963	
Nubia	1	Tompkins County		
Number Forty	1	New York County	10001	
Number Four	1	Lewis County	13367	
Nunda	1	Livingston County	14517	
Nyack	1	Rockland County	10960	
