= Clarence Center, New York =

- Census-designated place
- Location in Erie County and the state of New York
- Coordinates: 43°0′40″N 78°38′5″W
- Country: United States
- State: New York
- County: Erie
- Town: Clarence

Area
  - Total: 2.26 sq mi (5.85 km^{2})
  - Land: 2.26 sq mi (5.85 km^{2})
  - Water: 0 sq mi (0.00 km^{2})
- Elevation: 633 ft (193 m)

Population (2021)
  - Total: 3,337
  - Density: 1,153.7/sq mi (445.44/km^{2})
- Time zone: UTC-5 (Eastern (EST))
  - Summer (DST): UTC-4 (EDT)
- ZIP Codes: 14032 (Clarence Center); 14031 (Clarence)
- Area code: 716
- FIPS code: 36-15836
- GNIS feature ID: 0946736

Clarence Center is an affluent hamlet and census-designated place (CDP) in the town of Clarence in Erie County, New York, United States. Clarence Center (14032) is the most expensive zip code in all of Western New York and Central New York. It is the second most expensive zip code in Upstate New York with only 12866 (Saratoga Springs) having a higher average home price. The population was 3,337 as of 2021. It is part of the Buffalo-Niagara Falls metropolitan area.

Clarence Center, within the south-central part of the town, is the location of most of the town government facilities, although the actual town hall is within the Clarence postal zone.

Clarence Center is also one of the postal zones in the town with a ZIP code of 14032. This area comprises most of the northern part of the town.

== History ==
The community was founded in 1823 as Van Tines Corners. The community was the first in the town of Clarence to have access to a rail line, with the "Peanut" line being pulled through the community in 1853, the station was named "Clarence Center," Railroad service was cut off on December 31, 1977, and today the line has been mostly ripped up, replaced by a cycling trail, referred to as the "Peanut" line, an homage to the original "Peanut" line, on which rail came to the community.

=== Colgan Air Flight 3407 crash ===
On February 12, 2009 at 10:20 pm, a Continental Connection flight operated by Colgan Air went down in Clarence Center, killing all 44 passengers and five crew members, along with one resident on the ground whose house the plane impacted. The plane, a Bombardier Dash 8 Q400 74-seat turboprop, had logged only 1819 hours, having been delivered in 2008. Up to a week after the crash, the entire neighborhood was closed off because of the numerous residents wanting to see the crash site.

== Geography ==
Clarence Center is located at 43°0′40″N 78°38′5″W (43.011158, -78.634749). According to the United States Census Bureau, the CDP has a total area of 2.1 square miles (5.4 km^{2}), all land.

As suggested by its name, Clarence Center lies near the middle of the town.

== Demographics ==
Historical population
Census	Pop.	Note	%±
2020	2,605		—
U.S. Decennial Census

=== 2020 census ===
As of the 2020 census, Clarence Center had a population of 2,605. The median age was 44.7 years. 25.1% of residents were under the age of 18 and 18.8% of residents were 65 years of age or older. For every 100 females there were 90.0 males, and for every 100 females age 18 and over there were 86.2 males age 18 and over.

90.1% of residents lived in urban areas, while 9.9% lived in rural areas.

There were 961 households in Clarence Center, of which 34.2% had children under the age of 18 living in them. Of all households, 64.1% were married-couple households, 8.8% were households with a male householder and no spouse or partner present, and 23.0% were households with a female householder and no spouse or partner present. About 20.8% of all households were made up of individuals and 13.5% had someone living alone who was 65 years of age or older.

There were 994 housing units, of which 3.3% were vacant. The homeowner vacancy rate was 0.3% and the rental vacancy rate was 3.1%.

Racial composition as of the 2020 census
Race	Number	Percent
White	2,371	91.0%
Black or African American	20	0.8%
American Indian and Alaska Native	3	0.1%
Asian	102	3.9%
Native Hawaiian and Other Pacific Islander	0	0.0%
Some other race	14	0.5%
Two or more races	95	3.6%
Hispanic or Latino (of any race)	84	3.2%

=== 2000 census ===
As of the 2000 census, there were 1,747 people, 622 households, and 508 families residing in the hamlet. The population density was 822.5 inhabitants per square mile (317.6/km^{2}). There were 634 housing units at an average density of 298.5 per square mile (115.3/km^{2}). The racial makeup of the CDP was 98.28% White, 0.52% African American, 0.17% Native American, 0.17% Asian, 0.11% Pacific Islander, 0.29% from other races, and 0.46% from two or more races. Hispanic or Latino of any race were 0.97% of the population.

There were 622 households, out of which 41.0% had children under the age of 18 living with them, 69.9% were married couples living together, 9.2% had a female householder with no husband present, and 18.2% were non-families. 14.6% of all households were made up of individuals, and 7.1% had someone living alone who was 65 years of age or older. The average household size was 2.81 and the average family size was 3.13.

In the community, the population was spread out, with 28.6% under the age of 18, 6.4% from 18 to 24, 29.8% from 25 to 44, 21.5% from 45 to 64, and 13.7% who were 65 years of age or older. The median age was 37 years. For every 100 females, there were 95.6 males. For every 100 females age 18 and over, there were 88.5 males.

The median income for a household in the hamlet was $66,311, and the median income for a family was $70,179. Males had a median income of $53,542 versus $27,266 for females. The per capita income for the CDP was $25,363. About 1.7% of families and 1.0% of the population were below the poverty line, including none of those under age 18 and 6.3% of those age 65 or over.

== Characteristics ==
The heart of the community is the more heavily settled area by the intersection of Clarence Center and Goodrich Roads. This location is sometimes referred to as "the four corners" or merely "the corners". There is a business on each corner, currently a coffee shop, a bank, a day care center, and a small cluster of gift shops.

Although Clarence Center occupies most of the northern part of the town, the population is less than the part of the town that is called Clarence.

A hiking/biking trail connects Clarence Center to Akron, New York, to the east and to NY Route 78, Transit Road, to the west.

The J. Eshelman and Company Store at 6000 Goodrich Rd., was listed on the National Register of Historic Places in 1982.

== Education ==
It is in the Clarence Central School District.

East of the four corners is the Clarence Center Elementary School, which serves most of the northern part of the town.

== Notable people ==
- Dancer Neil Haskell is a Clarence Center native. He is an original cast member of the Broadway musical Hamilton: An American Musical.
- Retired National Hockey League player Marcel Dionne has a residence in Clarence Center.
- Billy Rafter, Hall of Fame auto racing driver
