= Harris Hill, New York =

Hamlet in New York State

- Census-designated place
- Location in Erie County and the state of New York
- Coordinates: 42°58′1″N 78°40′40″W
- Country: United States
- State: New York
- County: Erie
- Town: Clarence
- Named after: Asa Harris

Area
  - Total: 4.04 sq mi (10.46 km^{2})
  - Land: 4.04 sq mi (10.46 km^{2})
  - Water: 0 sq mi (0.00 km^{2})
- Elevation: 728 ft (222 m)

Population (2020)
  - Total: 5,839
  - Density: 1,445.3/sq mi (558.04/km^{2})
- Time zone: UTC-5 (Eastern (EST))
  - Summer (DST): UTC-4 (EDT)
- ZIP Codes: 14221 (Williamsville); 14031 (Clarence)
- FIPS code: 36-32391
- GNIS feature ID: 0952264

Harris Hill is a hamlet and census-designated place (CDP) located in the town of Clarence in Erie County, New York, United States. As of the 2020 census, Harris Hill had a population of 5,839. It is part of the Buffalo-Niagara Falls metropolitan area. The region is named after Asa Harris, a former officer in the American Colonial Army, who established a tavern near the top of a low hill northeast of Buffalo.

== Geography ==
Harris Hill is located at 42°58′1″N 78°40′40″W (42.967058, -78.677828). Harris Hill's ZIP code 14221 is shared with nearby Williamsville.

According to the United States Census Bureau, the CDP has a total area of 4.0 square miles (10 km^{2}), all land.

Harris Hill is located in the southwest corner of the town, just north of the northern Lancaster town line, and is centered on the intersection of Main Street (NY Route 5) and Harris Hill Road.

Just to the southeast of Harris Hill, is a large crushed stone quarry located in the town of Lancaster. The quarry plunges some 30 meters into the bedrock. The quarry, now owned by Buffalo Crushed Stone, was opened in 1904. Buffalo Crushed Stone is located on the south side of Wehrle Drive, just east of Harris Hill Road in Lancaster.

== History ==
Asa Harris's Tavern was a stop on the Underground Railroad. Freed slaves would sneak under Main Street (present-day NY Route 5) through limestone caves and exit north at the bottom of the Onondaga Formation into a swampy forest. The tavern has since been re-purposed as the Home Town Cleaners. It has since been renamed Reads Dry Cleaning & Shirt Laundry.

== Demographics ==
Historical population
Census	Pop.	Note	%±
2010	5,508		—
2020	5,839		6.0%
U.S. Decennial Census

=== 2020 census ===
As of the 2020 census, Harris Hill had a population of 5,839. The median age was 44.9 years. 19.0% of residents were under the age of 18 and 21.1% of residents were 65 years of age or older. For every 100 females there were 93.7 males, and for every 100 females age 18 and over there were 90.6 males age 18 and over.

100.0% of residents lived in urban areas, while 0.0% lived in rural areas.

There were 2,486 households in Harris Hill, of which 26.1% had children under the age of 18 living in them. Of all households, 53.9% were married-couple households, 14.2% were households with a male householder and no spouse or partner present, and 25.2% were households with a female householder and no spouse or partner present. About 27.4% of all households were made up of individuals and 14.4% had someone living alone who was 65 years of age or older.

There were 2,594 housing units, of which 4.2% were vacant. The homeowner vacancy rate was 0.5% and the rental vacancy rate was 4.9%.

Racial composition as of the 2020 census
Race	Number	Percent
White	5,083	87.1%
Black or African American	125	2.1%
American Indian and Alaska Native	6	0.1%
Asian	340	5.8%
Native Hawaiian and Other Pacific Islander	0	0.0%
Some other race	36	0.6%
Two or more races	249	4.3%
Hispanic or Latino (of any race)	149	2.6%

=== 2000 census ===
As of the census of 2000, there were 4,881 people, 1,859 households, and 1,435 families residing in the community. The population density was 1,207.0 inhabitants per square mile (466.0/km^{2}). There were 1,992 housing units at an average density of 492.6 per square mile (190.2/km^{2}). The racial makeup of the CDP was 97.38% White, 0.51% African American, 0.14% Native American, 1.25% Asian, 0.06% Pacific Islander, 0.39% from other races, and 0.27% from two or more races. Hispanic or Latino of any race were 0.82% of the population.

There were 1,859 households, out of which 32.7% had children under the age of 18 living with them, 67.6% were married couples living together, 6.7% had a female householder with no husband present, and 22.8% were non-families. 19.9% of all households were made up of individuals, and 11.0% had someone living alone who was 65 years of age or older. The average household size was 2.62 and the average family size was 3.04.

In the community, the population was spread out, with 25.4% under the age of 18, 5.0% from 18 to 24, 24.7% from 25 to 44, 26.1% from 45 to 64, and 18.8% who were 65 years of age or older. The median age was 42 years. For every 100 females, there were 93.8 males. For every 100 females age 18 and over, there were 92.3 males.

The median income for a household in the area was $62,500, and the median income for a family was $66,971. Males had a median income of $52,478 versus $31,910 for females. The per capita income for the CDP was $29,056. About 1.4% of families and 1.5% of the population were below the poverty line, including 0.7% of those under age 18 and 0.8% of those age 65 or over.

== Education ==
Most of the CDP is served by the Clarence Central School District, while a portion is in Williamsville Central School District.
