= Amherst, New York =

- Town
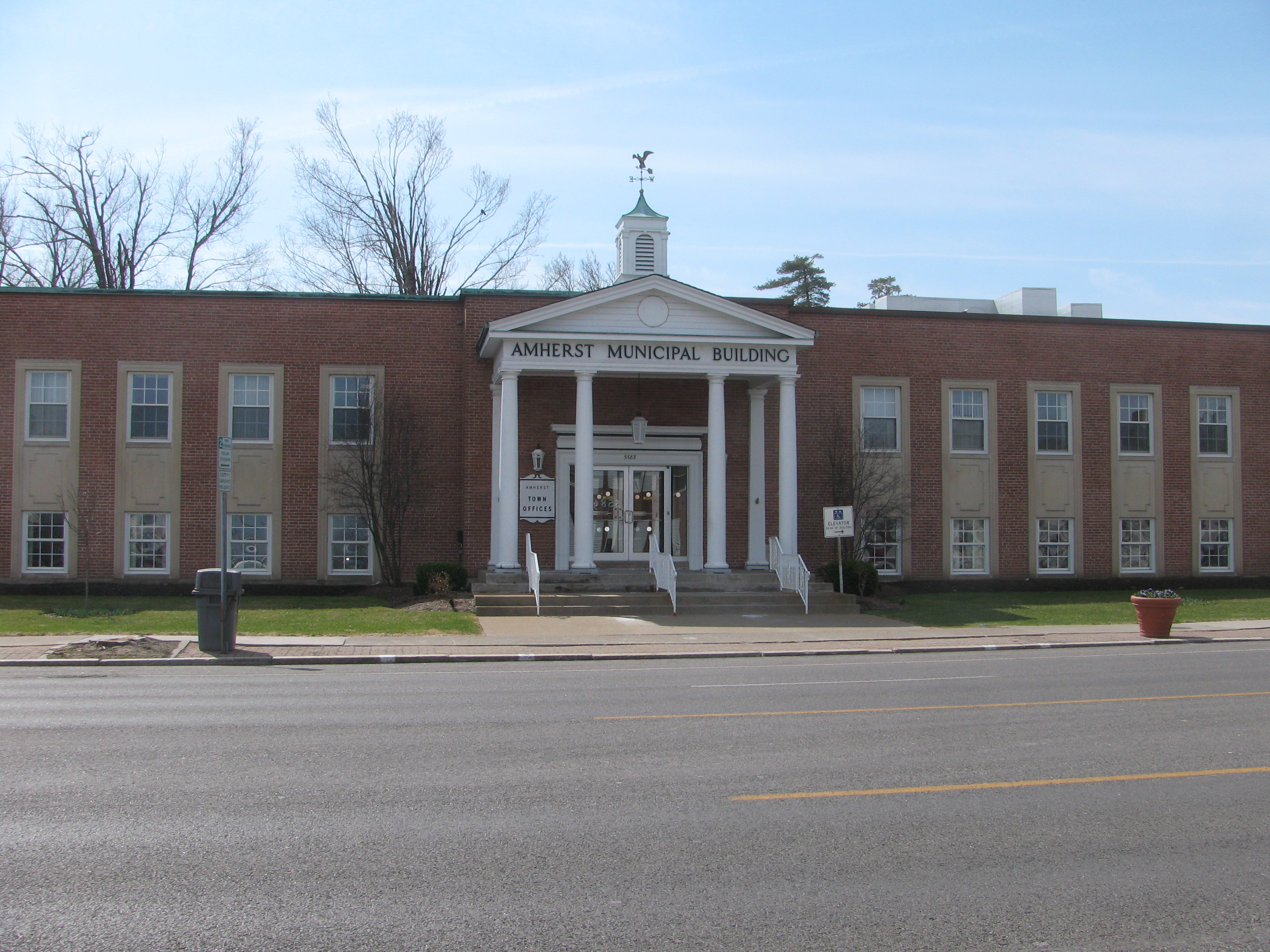
- Amherst Municipal Building

- Flag Seal

- Location of Amherst in Erie County, New York (left) and of Erie County in New York state (right)

- Location within New York Location within the United States Location within North America
- Coordinates: 42°58′42″N 78°48′00″W
- Country: United States
- State: New York
- County: Erie
- Incorporated: April 10, 1818
- Named for: Jeffery Amherst, 1st Baron Amherst

Government
  - Type: Town council
  - Supervisor: Shawn A. Lavin (D)
  - Deputy Supervisor: Angela Marinucci (D)
  - Councilmembers: List: John Davis (D); Jack Kavanaugh (D); Michael Szukala (D)
  - Clerk: Francina J. Spoth

Area
  - Total: 53.58 sq mi (138.78 km^{2})
  - Land: 53.20 sq mi (137.78 km^{2})
  - Water: 0.39 sq mi (1.00 km^{2}) 0.73%
- Elevation: 594 ft (181 m)

Population (2020)
  - Total: ▲129,595
  - Estimate (2019): 126,082
  - Density: 2,364.6/sq mi (912.96/km^{2})
- Time zone: UTC-5 (EST)
  - Summer (DST): UTC-4 (EDT)
- ZIP Codes: 14068, 14221, 14226, 14228, 14231, 14260, 14261 (Amherst); 14051 (East Amherst)
- Area code: 716
- FIPS code: 36-029-02000
- Website: www.amherst.ny.us

Amherst (/ˈæmhərst/) is a town in Erie County, New York, United States. It is a suburb of Buffalo. As of 2020, the town had a total population of 129,595. This represents an increase from 122,366 as reported in the 2010 census. It is the 14th most populated municipality in New York.

The second-largest in area and the most populous suburb of Buffalo, the town of Amherst encompasses the village of Williamsville as well as the hamlets of Eggertsville, Getzville, Snyder, Swormville, and East Amherst. The town is in the northern part of Erie County and borders a section of the Erie Canal.

Amherst is home to the north campus of the University at Buffalo, a campus of Erie Community College, a satellite campus of Bryant & Stratton College, and Daemen University.

== History ==
Amherst was created by the State of New York on April 10, 1818, from part of the town of Buffalo (later the city of Buffalo), which itself had previously been created from the town of Clarence. Amherst was named after Lord Jeffrey Amherst, commander-in-chief of the British army in North America from 1758 to 1763. Timothy S. Hopkins was elected the first supervisor of the town in 1819. Part of Amherst was later separated to form the town of Cheektowaga on March 22, 1839.

The opening of the Erie Canal in 1825 spurred Amherst's growth, bringing with it with new settlers and increased commerce. German immigrants settled in the northern part of the town as farmers, attracted by the fertile land in the area. The town's water resources encouraged the development of grist mills, saw mills, and other factories along Ellicott Creek. Several communities and hamlets started to develop around this time, such as Williamsville (1810s), Eggertsville and Snyder (1830s), East Amherst and Swormville (1850s), and Getzville (1860s).

== Geography ==
According to the United States Census Bureau, the town has a total area of 53.6 square miles (138.8 km^{2}), of which 53.2 square miles (137.8 km^{2}) is land and 0.39 square miles (1.0 km^{2}), or 0.73%, is water.

Much of Amherst was originally floodplain and marshland, portions of which have been drained in recent years to facilitate development of new homes and businesses. The central and southern parts of the town are heavily suburbanized. Despite this development, the hamlets of Eggertsville and Snyder and the village of Williamsville have managed to retain much of their original character. The northern part of the town is still relatively undeveloped, with the prominent exception of the portions along Niagara Falls Boulevard (U.S. Route 62) bordering the towns of Tonawanda and Wheatfield. Some sections of northern and eastern Amherst have experienced problems with collapsing residential foundations as a result of unstable soil conditions. A few active farms may still be found in the northern part of the town.

Amherst is bordered on the north by Tonawanda Creek and Niagara County. Ellicott Creek flows through the town.

=== Adjacent cities and towns ===
- Niagara County, Town of Pendleton - north
- Niagara County, City of North Tonawanda - northwest
- Town of Tonawanda - west
- City of Buffalo - southwest
- Town of Lancaster - southeast
- Town of Cheektowaga - south
- Town of Clarence - east

=== Neighborhoods ===
Areas within Amherst are referred to by the former post office station names and are not legally incorporated. During the 1990s, many of these regional post offices were closed and consolidated into the central Amherst 14226 post office on Bailey Avenue, leaving only a Williamsville (14221) post office on Sheridan Drive, a Getzville (14068) post office on Millersport Highway, and an East Amherst (14051) post office on Transit Road. Mailing addresses to areas within the town are Amherst, East Amherst, Eggertsville, Getzville, Snyder, and Williamsville. These postal districts are still recognized by the post office and widely referred to by citizens.

Some of these mailing addresses overlap: some areas of Clarence directly east of Transit Road have Williamsville addresses, although for the purposes of taxes, schools and community resources, these people are residents of the Town of Clarence.

The areas listed below are governed and run by the Town of Amherst except for the Village of Williamsville, an independent political entity.

- Eggertsville -- a hamlet in the southwest part of the town, bordering on Buffalo and centered around Eggert Road. Daemen University is located on Main Street (Route 5). The community is named after early postmaster Christian Eggert.
- Getzville -- a location near the center of the town adjacent to Campbell Boulevard (Route 270) and Dodge Road. The name comes from early resident Joseph Getz.
- Audubon - A location in the center of the town situated around John James Audubon Parkway. The town police, courthouse, and main library are located here.
- East Amherst (formerly Transit Station) -- An unincorporated community, or hamlet, in the eastern part of the town, shared with the Town of Clarence.
- North Bailey -- A location at the junction of Bailey Avenue and Maple Road.
- Snyder (originally Snyderville after postmaster Michael Snyder) -- A suburban community located between Eggertsville and the village of Williamsville.
- Swormville - A hamlet in the eastern part of the town, shared with the Town of Clarence. Named for Adam Schworm, prominent landowner and businessman.
- Williamsville - an incorporated village within Amherst, located in the southern part of the town.

=== Climate ===
Average high temperatures from May through October range from 60 to 81 degrees. Average high temperatures from November through March range from 31 to 47 degrees.

== Demographics ==
Historical population
Census	Pop.	Note	%±
1820	768		—
1830	2,489		224.1%
1840	2,451		−1.5%
1850	4,153		69.4%
1860	5,086		22.5%
1870	5,265		3.5%
1880	4,319		−18.0%
1890	4,014		−7.1%
1900	4,223		5.2%
1910	4,629		9.6%
1920	6,286		35.8%
1930	13,181		109.7%
1940	19,356		46.8%
1950	31,407		62.3%
1960	57,439		82.9%
1970	90,734		58.0%
1980	108,706		19.8%
1990	111,740		2.8%
2000	116,510		4.3%
2010	122,366		5.0%
2020	129,595		5.9%
Historical Population Figures

As of the census of 2010, there were 122,366 people, 48,894 households, and 29,840 families residing in the town. There were 51,179 housing units. The racial makeup of the town was 83.8% White, 5.7% African American, 0.2% Native American, 7.9% Asian, 0.0% Pacific Islander, 0.5% from other races, and 1.8% from two or more races. Hispanic or Latino of any race were 2.3% of the population.

There were 48,894 households, out of which 26.0% had children under the age of 18 living with them, 49.4% were married couples living together, 8.9% had a female householder with no husband present, and 39.0% were non-families. 27.1% of all households were made up of individuals, and 31.6% had someone living alone who was 65 years of age or older. The average household size was 2.33 and the average family size was 2.98.

The median income for a household in the town was $55,427, and the median income for a family was $68,951. Males had a median income of $51,667 versus $32,030 for females. The per capita income for the town was $27,647. About 4.2% of families and 6.4% of the population were below the poverty line, including 6.6% of those under age 18 and 5.4% of those age 65 or over.

51.7% of residents (aged 25 and over) have obtained a Bachelor's degree or higher, including 26.7% with a Graduate or professional degree.

== Economy ==
National Fuel and Life Storage are headquartered in Williamsville.

== Arts and culture ==
Many festivals are celebrated in Amherst throughout the year. The town is home to the Buffalo Niagara Heritage Village.

The Town of Amherst Archival Research Center is located within the Buffalo Niagara Historical Village, located at 3755 Tonawanda Creek Rd, Amherst NY 14228. It was formerly located at the Harlem Road Community Center, 4255 Harlem Road, Amherst NY 14226 (previous to that it was housed in the Former Reformed Mennonite Church which was listed on the National Register of Historic Places in 2003.)

== Sports ==
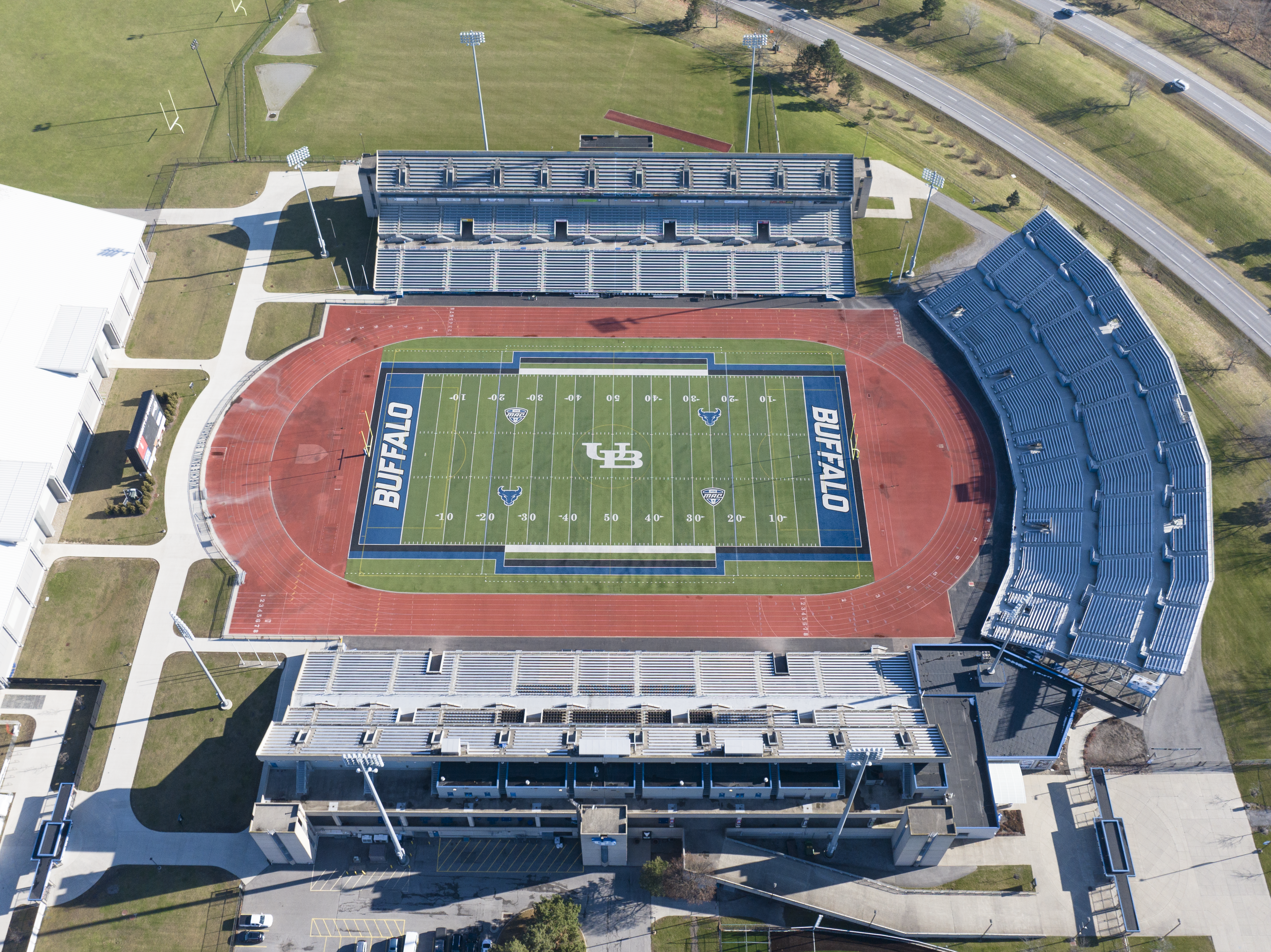
Broadview Stadium

Amherst is home to the Broadview Stadium, Broadview Arena, and Amherst Audubon Field, all utilized by the University at Buffalo Buffalo Bulls.

The Northtown Center is the town's ice hockey arena. The arena is the home of the Buffalo Beauts of the National Women's Hockey League, the University at Buffalo Bulls men's ice hockey team, and the Buffalo Wings, a professional inline hockey team competing in Major League Roller Hockey.

== Government ==
=== Crime and public safety ===
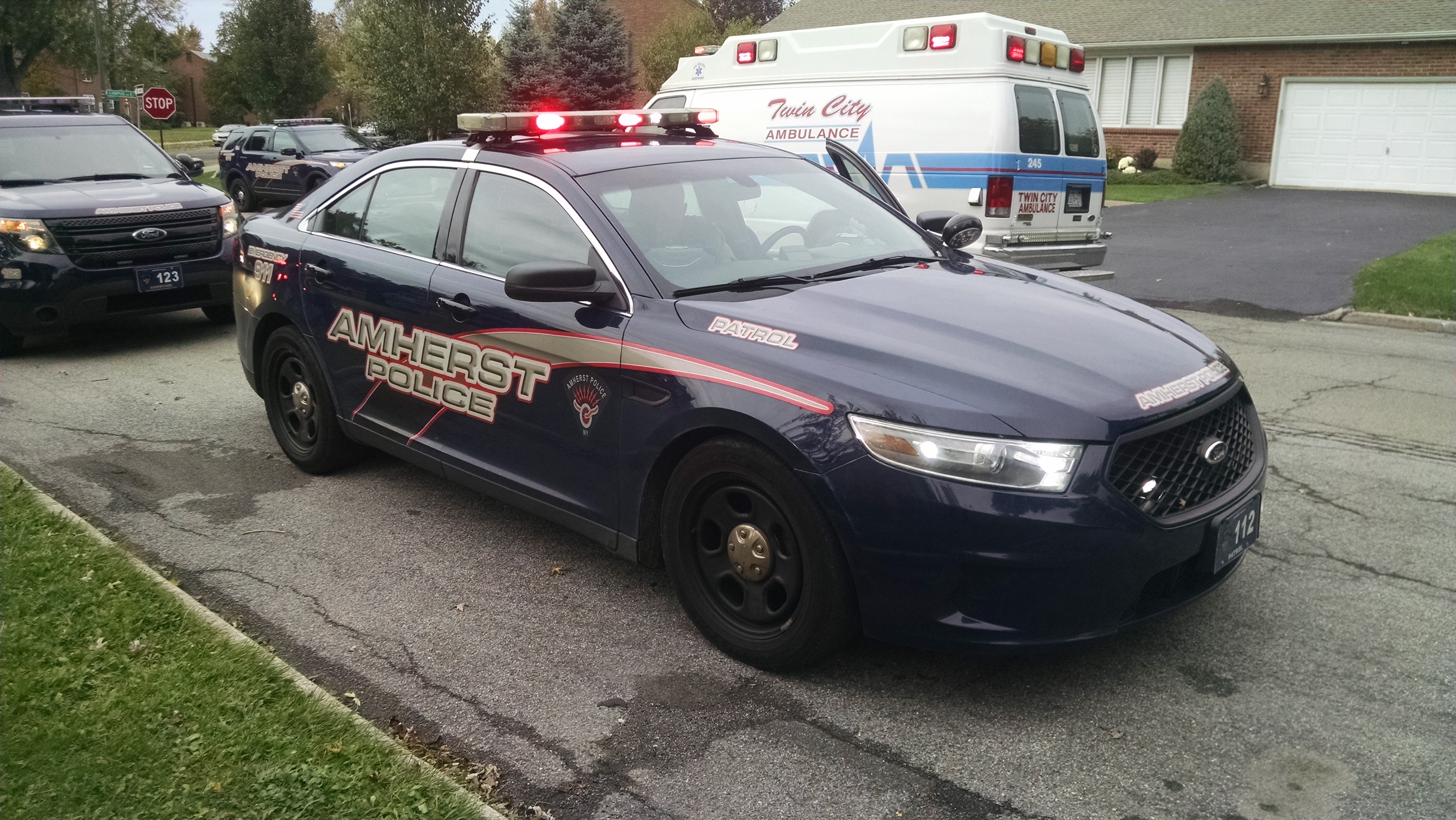
Town of Amherst police Ford Taurus

As of 2014, the Amherst Police Department employed 154 officers and 35 full and part-time civilian employees including the Chief, Assistant Chief, and eight captains.

== Education ==
=== Higher education ===
There are five separate higher educational institutions with campuses in the town.

- The North Campus of the University at Buffalo, a nationally ranked tier 1 research university.

All university programs apart from architecture, planning, nursing, dentistry, medicine, pharmacy, and public health reside here.

- Daemen University
- One of three campuses of Erie Community College
- Bryant and Stratton College
- A satellite campus of Canisius College

=== Public schools ===
There are four separate public school districts within the town.

- Williamsville Central School District

The largest district and comprises the eastern half of the town along with portions of the Town of Clarence.

- Amherst Central School District

Covering the southwestern portion of the town with its core in the Eggertsville and Snyder areas. It operates Amherst Central High School.

- Sweet Home Central School District

Covering the northwestern portion of the town along with portions of the Town of Tonawanda with its core in West Amherst and Getzville.

- Clarence Central School District

A small southeastern part of the town.

== Media ==
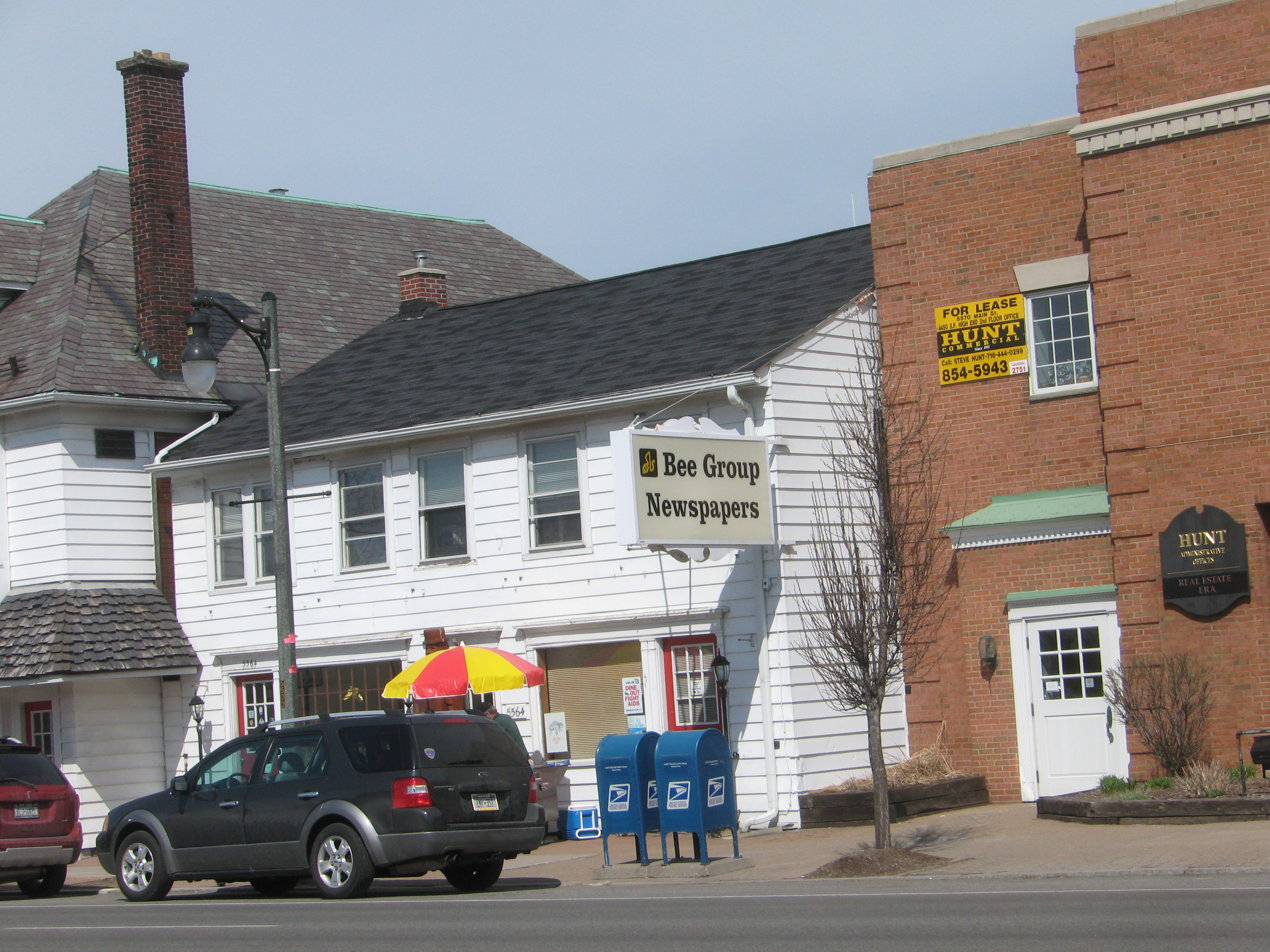
The Amherst Bee installed Amherst's first telephone line.

Amherst is served by the Amherst Bee newspaper. In 1969 Paul Kurtz founded the publishing house Prometheus Books in Amherst.

== Infrastructure ==
- Interstate 90 (New York State Thruway) passes through the southern part of town.
- Interstate 290 (Youngmann Memorial Highway) travels through the town diagonally from I-90 to US 62 and beyond to Tonawanda
- Interstate 990 (Lockport Expressway), located entirely within the Town of Amherst, runs in a roughly north–south direction through the southwest and central part of Amherst until it ends at Millersport Highway (NY 263).
- U.S. Route 62 marks the western town line as Niagara Falls Boulevard as the route heads north, then as Sheridan Drive then Bailey Avenue heading south out of town.
- New York State Route 5 (Main Street) passes through the town.
- New York State Route 78 (Transit Road) marks the eastern town line.
- New York State Route 240 (Harlem Road) is a north–south road from Sheridan Drive (NY 324) south heading out of town.
- New York State Route 263 (Grover Cleveland Highway, Millersport Highway) is a north–south road from Bailey Avenue (US 62) to Transit Road. (NY 78).
- New York State Route 270 (Campbell Boulevard) is a north–south road from Millersport Highway (NY 263) north out of town.
- New York State Route 277 (North Forest Road, Union Road) is a north–south road from Sheridan Drive (NY 324) south out of town.
- New York State Route 324 (Sheridan Drive) is an east–west road through the town from Niagara Falls Boulevard (US 62) east out of town.

Millard Filmore Suburban Hospital is located in the center of town on Maple Road.

== Notable people ==
• Neil Abercrombie, former governor of Hawaii

- Anita Álvarez, Olympic synchronized swimmer
- Eric Andersen, singer-songwriter, grew up in the hamlet of Snyder
- Ronald C. Brock, adjutant general of New York
- Richard J. Burke, journalist, poet, and playwright
- John W. Cudmore, surgeon and US Army major general
- Jack Davis, industrialist and politician
- Al Dekdebrun, former pro football quarterback and Amherst Town Supervisor
- Dan Gronkowski, former NFL tight end
- Rob Gronkowski, former NFL tight end for the New England Patriots and the Tampa Bay Buccaneers
- Jeffrey Gundlach, bond manager, graduated from Amherst High School
- Chris Hajt, former NHL player
- James P. Hayes, former New York state assemblyman
- Dan Herbeck, journalist for The Buffalo News
- Marc Evan Jackson, comedian
- Carrie Keagan, TV personality
- Bruce Kershner, environmentalist
- Andy Kulberg, rock and blues bassist
- Nick Langworthy, U.S. Congressional Rep.
- Joe Mack, 2021 1st-round draft pick, playing catcher for the Miami Marlins
- Wendie Malick, actress
- Thomas McCollum, professional hockey player
- Norman McCombs, businessman
- Joe Mesi, professional boxer, attended Sweet Home High School
- Ian Murphy, alternative journalist and satirist
- Harry Neale, hockey broadcaster and former NHL coach
- Keith O'Neil, former NFL player
- Brooks Orpik, NHL defenseman
- Wayne Patrick, former NFL player
- Michael Ranzenhofer, New York state senator
- Edward Rath III, New York state senator
- Mike Robitaille, former NHL player and current Sabres broadcaster
- Kyle Roche, attorney
- Mark Rubin, former NFL player
- Hugh B. Scott, judge
- Billy Sheehan, rock bassist
- Barnett Slepian, physician murdered by anti-abortion terrorist James Charles Kopp
- John Stevens, 2004 American Idol finalist
- Satish K. Tripathi, president of the State University of New York at Buffalo
- James Whitmore, actor, attended Amherst High School
- Gordon Yaeger, notable pilot of the Bell Rocket Belt

== See also ==
- List of Designated Historic Properties in Amherst, New York
