= East Amherst, New York =

Coordinates: 43°01′06″N 78°41′48″W

- Hamlet
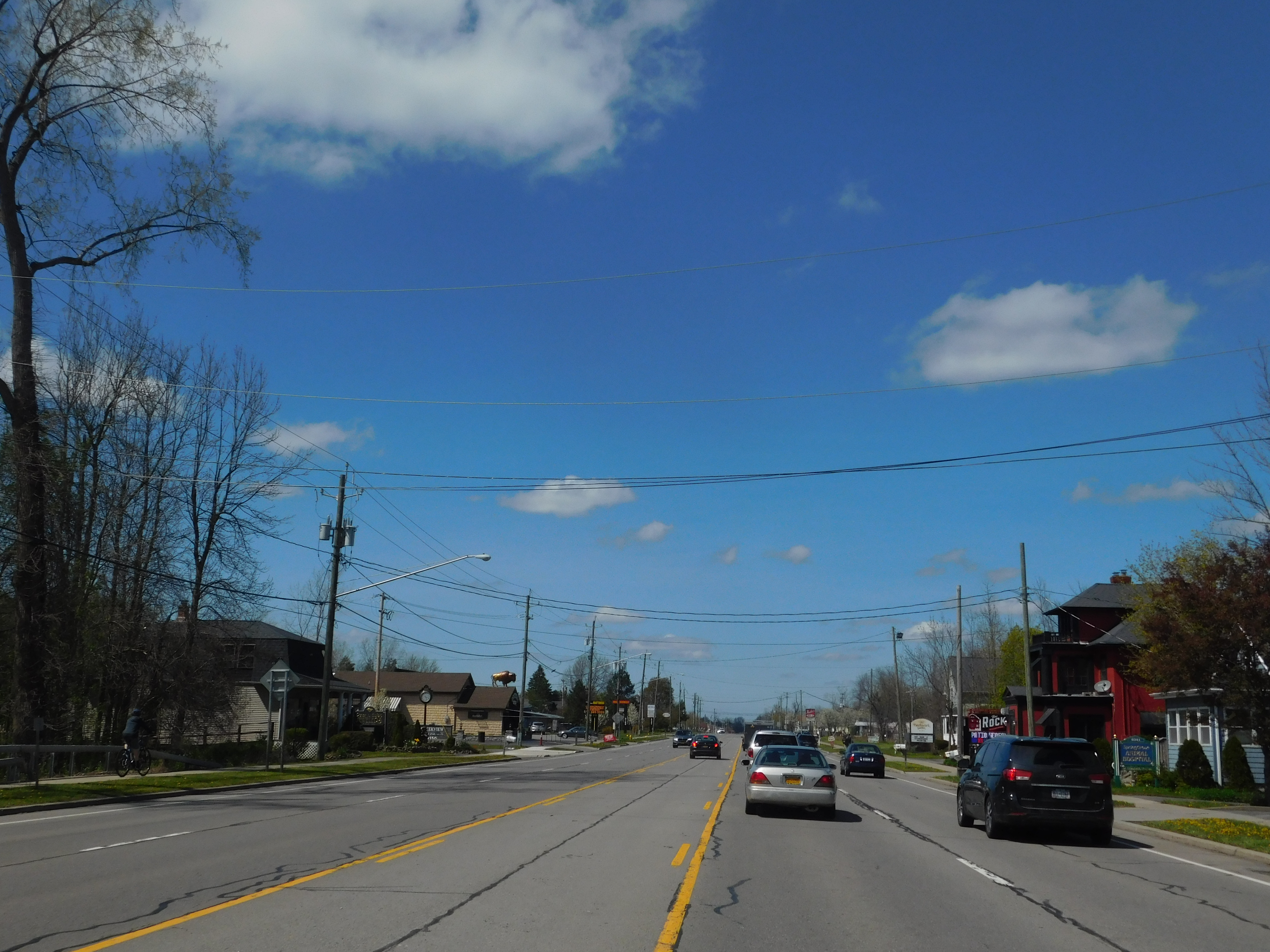
- NY 78 in East Amherst
- Interactive map of East Amherst, New York
- Country: United States
- State: New York
- County: Erie
- Town: Amherst, Clarence
- Elevation: 694.98 ft (211.83 m)

Population
  - Total: 24,914
- Time zone: UTC-5 Eastern Standard Time
- Area code: 716
- Average Household Income: $113,750

East Amherst is a suburban hamlet located 16 miles (26 km) northeast of downtown Buffalo, in Erie County, New York, United States. It straddles the towns of Amherst and Clarence, and comprises the majority of ZIP code 14051.

== History ==
East Amherst is a wealthy suburb centered in an area originally known as Transit Station, a name that has its origins in the railroad station of the New York Central "Peanut Line", so called from its narrow gauge tracks, that crossed Transit Road just north of Muegel Road. The New York Central Railway arrived in the area in 1854, with the completion of the Canandaigua and Niagara Falls railroads. By 1858, the completion of the railroad spurred the development of the area and other hamlets, such as Transit Station, now East Amherst, and Getzville. As its farmlands were developed into residential subdivisions, East Amherst began to emerge as the most frequently used name for the area.

Today, East Amherst is home to the headquarters of fast food chain Mighty Taco, founded in 1973 in Buffalo. The administrative office of the Williamsville Central School District is located in East Amherst as well as 3 of the District's 13 school buildings.

== Fire and police services ==
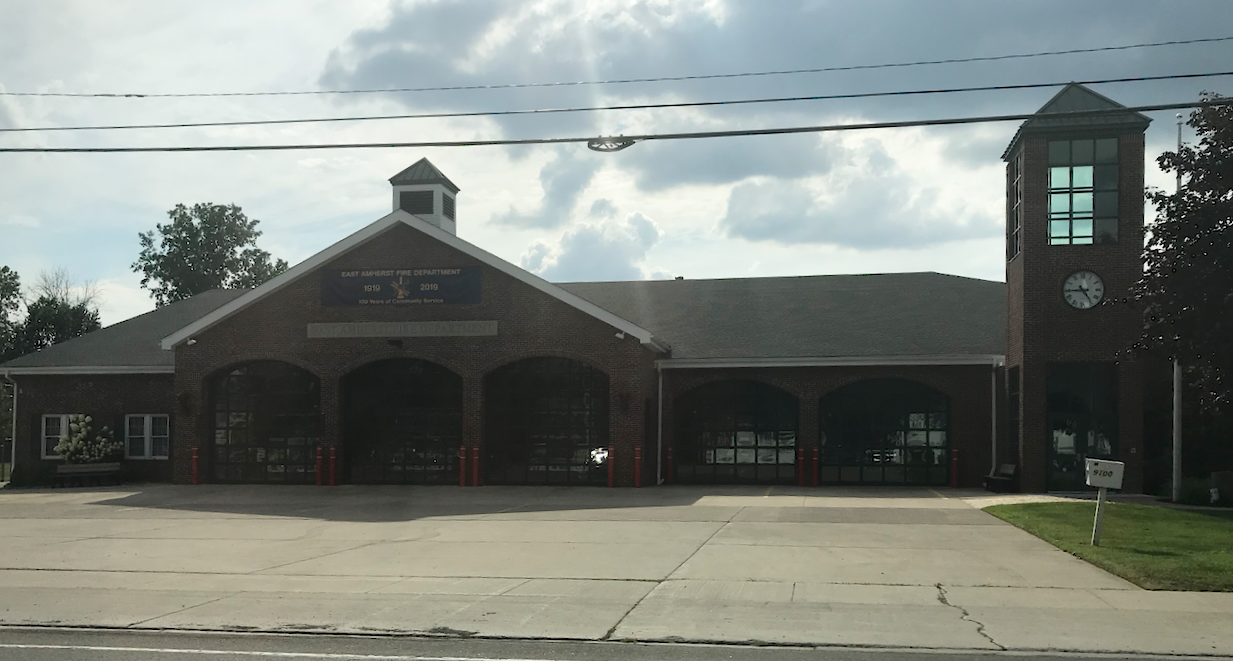
The East Amherst Fire Department

Fire protection is primarily provided by the East Amherst Fire Department, as well as by Swormville Fire Company and Clarence Center Volunteer Fire Company.

The part of East Amherst within the town of Amherst is served by the Amherst Police Department. The part within the town of Clarence is served by the New York State Police and the Erie County Sheriff's Department.

== Notable people ==
- Dave Andreychuk, NHL player
- Scotty Bowman, Hall of Fame hockey coach
- Nick DeSimone. NHL player
- Connor Fields, Professional lacrosse player in the Premier Lacrosse League
- John Koelmel, former CEO of First Niagara Bank
- Joe Mack, MLB catcher
- Brooks Orpik, NHL player
- Jason Pominville, NHL player
- Shane Sims, NHL player
- Raymond Walter, New York State Assemblyman
