= Gordon Yaeger =

American rocket pilot

Gordon R. Yaeger (1927-2005) is known for piloting the Bell Rocket Belt at the 1964 New York City World Fair, in the James Bond movie Thunderball, in The Reluctant Astronaut starring Don Knotts, and on the TV shows Gilligan's Island and Lost in Space.

Yaeger was born on May 5, 1927, and went to Burgard High School in Buffalo, New York, before attending the University at Buffalo and UCLA. He moved his family to Amherst, New York in 1955. He worked for Bell Aircraft Corporation in Wheatfield, New York.

In 2008, the Town of Amherst named a street after him.

On January 23, 2005, Yaeger died in Buffalo Hospice in Cheektowaga aged 77 after a long illness. He left behind his wife Nancy, eight children and 15 grandchildren.
