= J. Eshelman and Company Store =

Historic commercial building in New York, United States

- U.S. National Register of Historic Places
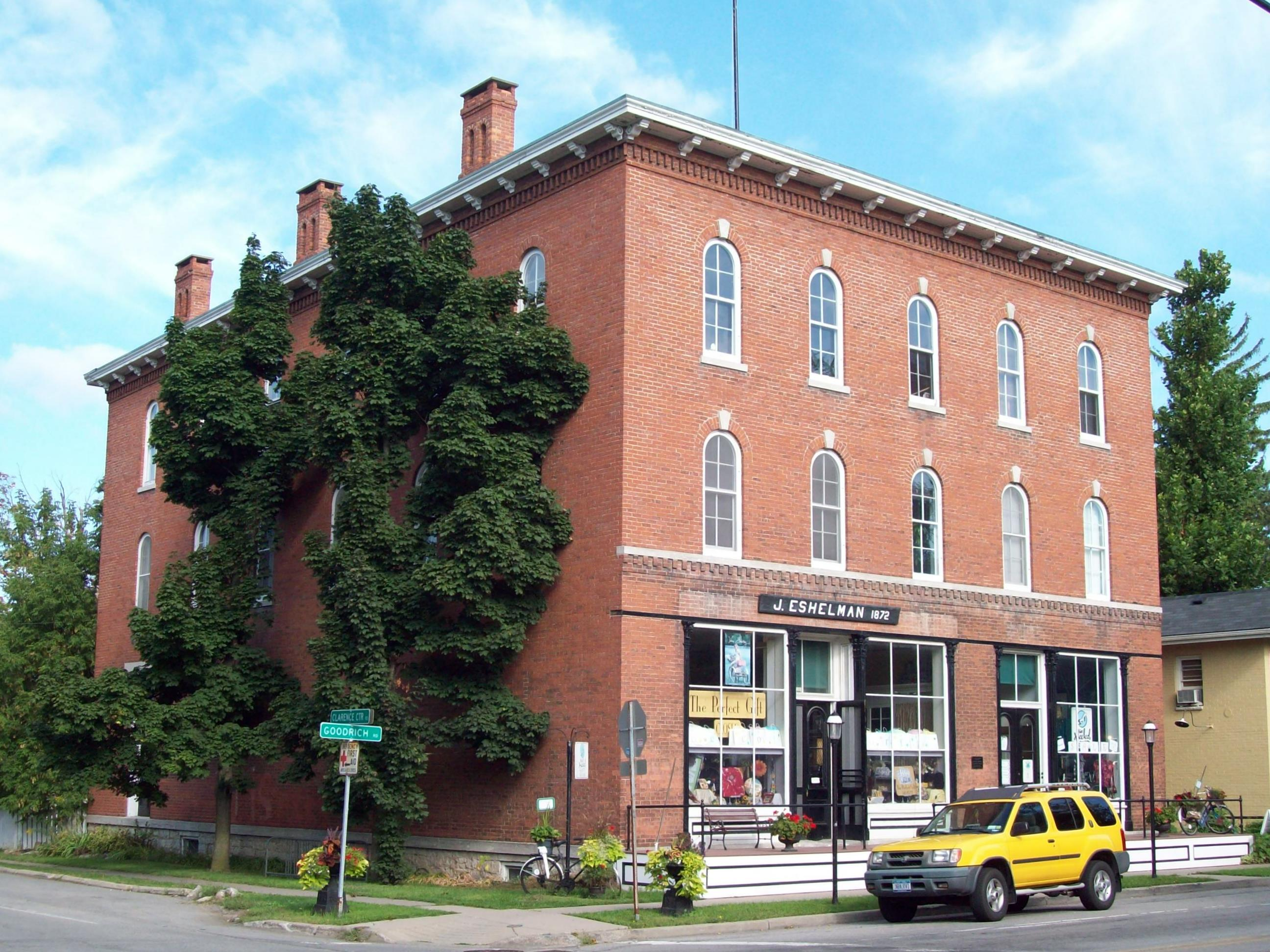
- J. Eshelman and Company Store, August 2010

- Location within New York Location within the United States
- Location: 6000 Goodrich Rd., Clarence Center, New York
- Coordinates: 43°0′38″N 78°38′15″W
- Built: 1872
- Architectural style: Italianate
- NRHP reference No.: 82003356
- Added to NRHP: May 06, 1982

J. Eshelman and Company Store, also known as The Square Deal Store, is a historic general store located at Clarence Center in Erie County, New York. It is a three-story, brick and cast iron commercial building constructed in the Italianate style in 1872. It exemplifies the type of brick and cast iron commercial building common to the region from the 1850s to the 1880s.

It was listed on the National Register of Historic Places in 1982.
