= John Koelmel =

John R. Koelmel
- Born: Buffalo, New York
- Education: College of the Holy Cross (BA)
- Known for: Former Chief Executive Officer, President, First Niagara Bank (2006-2013); Former President of LECOM Harborcenter
- Spouse: Marsha Koelmel

John R. Koelmel is board chairman at Kaleida Health and chairman of the New York Power Authority.

== First Niagara ==
Koelmel served as the former president and chief executive officer of the Buffalo based First Niagara Bank and its parent, First Niagara Financial Group, serving in that capacity from December 2006 to March 2013. A career Certified Public Accountant, Koelmel joined First Niagara in January 2004, initially serving as Chief Financial Officer. Prior to joining First Niagara, he spent 26 years (1976–2000) with KPMG, reaching the position of the Managing Partner of its Upstate New York operations. Koelmel then joined Financial Institutions, Inc, parent of Five Star Bank, serving as its Chief Administrative Officer until 2002, when he left to become an independent consultant. In his career at First Niagara, Koelmel oversaw the massive expansion of the bank, more than doubling its size during his tenure. He received $3.8 million in total compensation in 2012. He was dismissed on March 19, 2013, amid concerns of languishing stock prices.

== Business roles ==
Koelmel has served on a variety of boards in the Buffalo Area, including Kaleida Health, the Buffalo Niagara Partnership, Great Lakes Health, the New York Bankers Association, and Buffalo Place. In May 2012, he was tapped by New York Governor Andrew Cuomo to head up the New York Power Authority, replacing the outgoing Michael Townsend.

=== HarborCenter ===
Koelmel served as President of LECOM Harborcenter, overseeing the hockey and entertainment complex developed by Buffalo Sabres owners Terry and Kim Pegula. The role lasted 21 months, with Koelmel stepping down abruptly.

== Personal life ==
An Orchard Park, New York native and a graduate of Orchard Park High School, Koelmel graduated from the College of the Holy Cross in 1974 with a Bachelor of Arts Degree in Economics and Accounting. He currently resides in East Amherst, New York with his wife, Marsha and her three children, Jensen, Lauren and Caroline. He also has two adult children.
