= Richard J. Burke =

American journalist

Richard J. Burke (October 9, 1915 – November 4, 1999) was an Irish-American journalist, poet, and playwright. He was born in Buffalo, New York on October 9, 1915, the son of Joseph Raymond Burke and Josephine Catherine Keating. He was married on October 19, 1940, to Josephina Battaglia the daughter of Carmelo Battaglia of Montemaggiore Belsito, Palermo, Sicily, and Antonia Fasulo of Burgio, Agrigento, Sicily.

Burke signed-up with Troop E, 121st Cavalry Regiment, United States National Guard in the 1930s and, after the Guard was federalised, was stationed at Fort McClellan in Alabama from October 15, 1940, until 1941. At the outbreak of World War II, he and his wife moved to New York City where he worked for the United States Office of War Information, handling information for the British, Scandinavian and Russian desks.

In the 1950s, he became News Director of WBEN Radio and WBEN-TV in Buffalo, New York. Later, as a journalist for the Buffalo Evening News, he traveled to Rome for the final session of Vatican II in 1965 and covered Pope Paul's historic appearance before the United Nations. During his 28-year career at the Buffalo newspaper he received numerous awards, including the New York State Associated Press Association Award for a series of articles entitled Free Wheeling in WNY about his 1972 bicycle tour of Western New York. He also wrote a weekly nature column which was illustrated with his own thumbnail sketches.

After retiring from the Buffalo Evening News in 1977 he wrote articles on Spanish galleon hunting and lost treasures for national magazines and researched the Spanish occupation of the Caribbean. He was struck by a speeding motorist in front of his home in Amherst, New York on November 4, 1999. At the time of his death he was working on a screenplay and several plays.
