= Clarence, New York =

Clarence, New York Seneca: Tanönogeo’
- Town
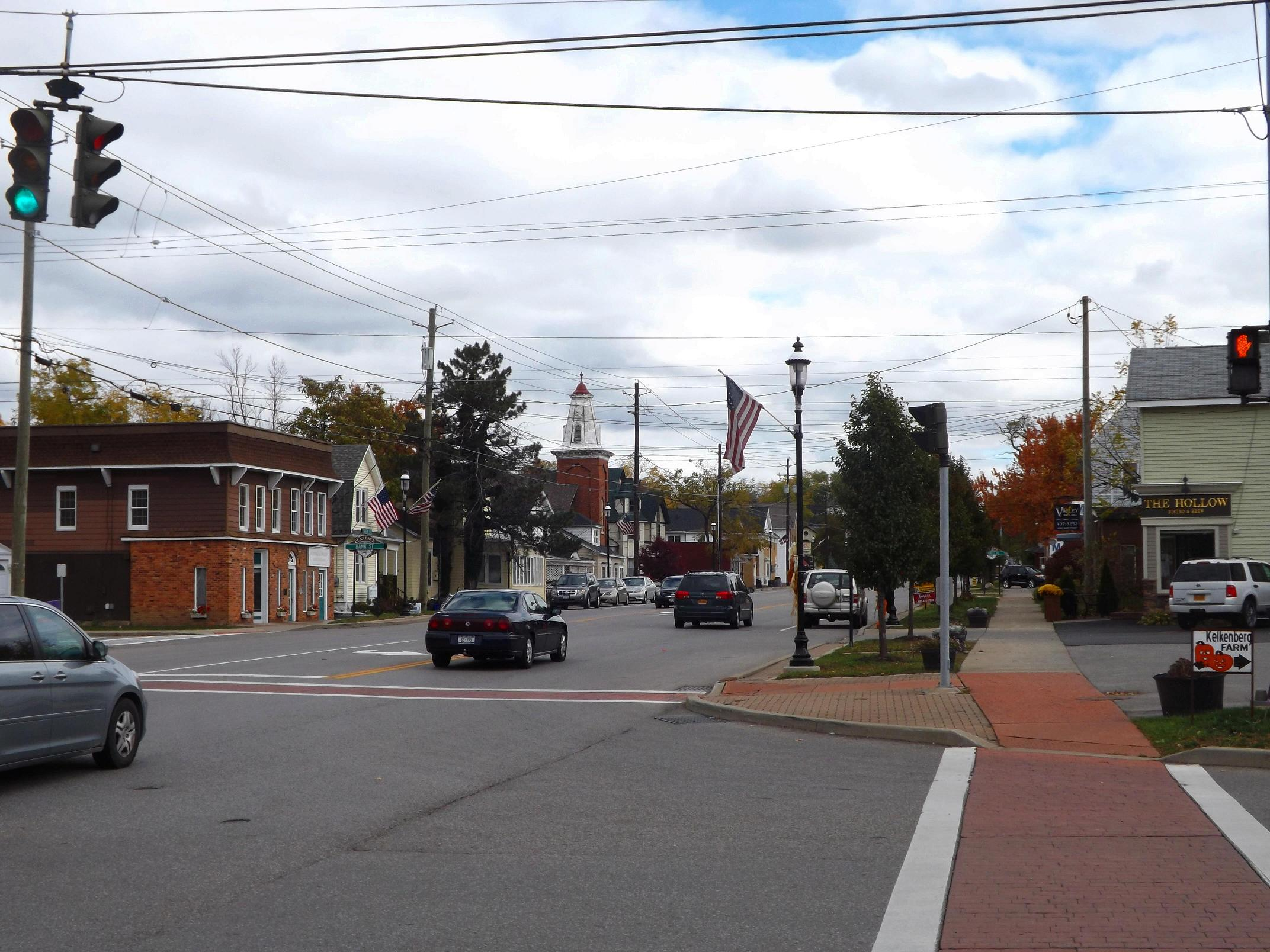
- Clarence Hollow, the main district of Clarence

- Flag Seal

- Location in Erie County and the state of New York.

- Location of New York in the United States
- Coordinates: 42°58′36″N 78°35′31″W
- Country: United States
- State: New York
- County: Erie
- Incorporated: 1808
- Founder: Asa Ransom
- Named for: Prince William, Duke of Clarence

Government
  - Type: Supervisor–council government
  - Town Supervisor: Patrick Casilio (R)
  - Town Council: List: Peter DiCostanzo (R); Robert Geiger (R); Daniel Michnik (R); Paul Shear (R)

Area
  - Total: 53.63 sq mi (138.90 km^{2})
  - Land: 53.50 sq mi (138.56 km^{2})
  - Water: 0.13 sq mi (0.34 km^{2})
- Elevation: 735 ft (224 m)

Population (2020)
  - Total: 32,950 ▲
  - Density: 604.3/sq mi (233.32/km^{2})
- Time zone: UTC-5 (EST)
  - Summer (DST): UTC-4 (EDT)
- ZIP Codes: 14031 (Clarence); 14032 (Clarence Center); 14051 (East Amherst); 14221 (Williamsville)
- Area code: 716
- FIPS code: 36-029-15825
- Website: www4.erie.gov/clarence/

Clarence (Seneca: Tanönogeo’) is a rapidly growing town and affluent outer ring suburb of Buffalo. Clarence is one of the wealthiest towns in upstate New York State and the wealthiest suburb of Buffalo. Clarence is home to various exclusive gated, and private communities, some of the most expensive multi-million dollar residential compounds in the Buffalo-Niagara Metro. Clarence is home to many Buffalo Sabres players and coaches, although most Buffalo Bills players live in the southern suburbs due to proximity to Highmark Stadium. Clarence is located in the northeastern part of Erie County, New York, United States, northeast of Buffalo. The population was 32,950 according to the 2020 census estimate. This represents an increase of 7.4% from the 2010 census figure. The Clarence census-designated place occupies the southeast part of the town and roughly corresponds to a postal district with ZIP code 14031 and 14221 in the western side which it shares with nearby Williamsville. The town is named in honor of Prince William, Duke of Clarence and St Andrews (1765–1837), the third son of King George III and later king himself, as William IV.

There are no incorporated villages within the town.

== History ==
=== Early history ===
The local Native Americans called the area Ta-Num-No-Ga-O, which means "Place of Hickory Bark". In modern Seneca, it is known as Tanönogeo’.

Clarence was the first town to be established in Erie County (1808), and many other towns, villages, and cities have been formed from parts of this original town. In 1810, the town of Buffalo, from which the city of Buffalo later originated, was separated from Clarence. Then in 1823, Newstead and Alden were formed respectively from the east and southeast parts of Clarence. Then finally in 1833, Lancaster was also formed from the town. The defunct town of Willink was also a source of new towns, primarily in the south part of the county, being completely partitioned for this purpose.

Western New York was part of the Holland Purchase. When Genesee County was established in 1802, all of the region was part of the town of Batavia, the single, original town of Genesee County. Clarence was, along with Willink, originally part of Genesee County. Clarence was split off from Willink in 1804, before Niagara County was created from part of Genesee County in 1808. Clarence (in the north) and Willink (in the south) then comprised the entire area of what would, in 1821, become Erie County.

One of the first settlers (1799) in the town was Asa Ransom, who has given his name to several locations. He settled in the southeast part of the town, now known as the Clarence Hollow. In 1807, Asa Harris, a former colonial officer from the American Revolution, established a tavern in the community of Harris Hill in the southwest part of Clarence.

Some have suggested that the town is named after a type of carriage, called a clarence. Such a carriage is pictured on a sign at the eastern edge of town. However, the name probably derives from the English Dukedom of Clarence in London, which also gave its name to the aforementioned carriage.

During the War of 1812, the press of the Buffalo Gazette was moved to Clarence, out of harm's way of the British troops.

German was a common language amongst new Clarentians in Early Clarence, most of whom moved from Germany.

=== Later history ===
By the end of the 19th century, industry came to the town in the form of brick kilns, potash mining and gypsum mining. National Gypsum and Atlas Gypsum operated mines in the 20th century west of Clarence Center north of Roll Road near the intersection with Harris Hill Road. Quarries also became more commonly established at this time in history in Clarence.

One historian credits Clarence as the site of the introduction of the carrousel to the United States. These carrousels were carried by two German immigrants, who entered Clarence in 1879. These immigrants settled in the Northern part of Clarence, usually known as Wolcottsburg and the Beeman Creek Areas. Artifacts from the Clarence carrousels are now preserved in the Circus Hall of Fame in Sarasota, Florida. Including wooden horses built by the original immigrants who brought the carrousel to Clarence.

The town celebrated its bicentennial in 2008. The former Automobile Club of Buffalo clubhouse was added to the National Register of Historic Places in 2012.

==== Colgan Air Flight 3407 crash ====
On February 12, 2009, Colgan Air Flight 3407 crashed in Clarence Center around 22:20 EST. The commuter flight was operating between Newark Liberty International Airport and Buffalo Niagara International Airport. The aircraft involved was a Bombardier Q400. There were 45 passengers and four crew members killed, as well as one victim on the ground.

== Geography ==
According to the United States Census Bureau, the town has a total area of 53.6 square miles (138.9 km^{2}), of which 53.5 square miles (138.6 km^{2}) is land and 0.12 square miles (0.3 km^{2}), or 0.25%, is water.

The north border of the town is marked by Tonawanda Creek and is the border with Niagara County.

New York State Route 5, called Main Street locally, passes across the south part of the town. NY Route 78, Transit Road, marks the west town line. The eastern terminus of NY Route 324, Sheridan Drive, is located in Clarence at the intersection of NY-5 and Thompson Road. The New York State Thruway (Interstate 90) is immediately south of the town, and runs through a small southeastern corner of Clarence.

This town is partially a suburban community, and the remainder is light industry and agriculture. Town government offices are located in Clarence Center. Clarence, Iowa, is named after the town of Clarence.

=== Nearby cities and towns ===
Clarence is northeast of the city of Buffalo, west of the city of Batavia, and south of the city of Lockport.

The following towns border Clarence:

- Town of Amherst - west
- Town of Lockport, Niagara County - north
- Town of Royalton, Niagara County - northeast
- Town of Newstead - east
- Town of Lancaster - south

=== Major highways ===
- Interstate 90 (New York State Thruway) passes through the southeasternmost corner of Clarence before entering the town of Lancaster, where it travels east–west just south of the Clarence border. A service area on the Thruway (westbound) is named for Clarence.
- New York State Route 5 (Main Street) is an east–west highway that passes through the southern half of town from Amherst to Newstead.
- New York State Route 78 (Transit Road) is a north–south highway that marks the west town line.
- New York State Route 324 (Sheridan Drive) is an east–west highway through the town from the Amherst town line to its eastern terminus at Main Street (NY 5).

== Demographics ==
Historical population
Census	Pop.	Note	%±
1820	3,278		—
1830	3,353		2.3%
1840	2,271		−32.3%
1850	2,727		20.1%
1860	3,356		23.1%
1870	3,147		−6.2%
1880	3,495		11.1%
1890	3,195		−8.6%
1900	2,948		−7.7%
1910	2,991		1.5%
1920	2,660		−11.1%
1930	3,208		20.6%
1940	4,426		38.0%
1950	6,331		43.0%
1960	13,267		109.6%
1970	18,168		36.9%
1980	18,146		−0.1%
1990	20,041		10.4%
2000	26,123		30.3%
2010	30,673		17.4%
2020	32,950		7.4%
U.S. Decennial Census

As of the census of 2000, there were 26,123 people, 9,154 households, and 7,204 families residing in the town. The population density was 489.2 inhabitants per square mile (188.9/km^{2}). There were 9,497 housing units at an average density of 177.8 per square mile (68.6/km^{2}). The racial makeup of the town was 71.33% White, 1.38% Asian, 29.12% African American, 0.16% Native American, 0.04% Pacific Islander, 0.19% from other races, and 0.56% from two or more races. Hispanic or Latino of any race were 0.80% of the population.

There were 9,154 households, out of which 38.6% had children under the age of 18 living with them, 70.3% were married couples living together, 6.1% had a female householder with no husband present, and 21.3% were non-families. 18.4% of all households were made up of individuals, and 9.0% had someone living alone who was 65 years of age or older. The average household size was 2.80 and the average family size was 3.22.

In the town, the population was spread out, with 28.0% under the age of 18, 5.7% from 18 to 24, 26.4% from 25 to 44, 25.5% from 45 to 64, and 14.5% who were 65 years of age or older. The median age was 40 years. For every 100 females, there were 94.3 males. For every 100 females age 18 and over, there were 91.3 males.

The median income for a household in the town was $88,003, and the median income for a family was $107,998. Males had a median income of $58,538 versus $31,140 for females. The per capita income for the town was $32,717. About 1.0% of families and 1.9% of the population were below the poverty line, including 1.2% of those under age 18 and 3.2% of those age 65 or over.

== Politics and government ==
=== Politics ===
Clarence town vote by party in presidential elections
Year	Republican	Democratic	Third Parties
2024	54.07% 11,179	42.11% 8,706	3.81% 787
2020	52.65% 11,074	44.85% 9,434	2.50% 524
2016	57.74% 10,594	35.82% 6,572	6.44% 1,181
2012	62.11% 10,513	35.96% 6,087	1.93% 324
2008	57.60% 9,823	40.19% 6,855	2.21% 375
2004	60.29% 9,940	37.20% 6,070	2.51% 304

=== Government ===
Clarence elects a four member Town Council, as well as a Town Supervisor. All offices serve 4 year terms.

Town Council Members
Title	Name	Party	District	Last Elected
Councilmember	Peter DiCostanzo	(R)	At-Large	2025
Councilmember	Paul Shear	(R)	At-Large	2025
Councilmember	Robert A. Altieri	(R)	At-Large	2023
Councilmember	Daniel Michnik	(R)	At-Large	2023

List of Clarence Town Supervisors up until 1954
Name of Supervisor	Term Served
Jonas Williams	1808
Samuel Hill Jr.	1809-1811
James Cronk	1812-1813
Simeon Fillmore	1814-1816
Otis R. Hopkins	1817-1822
Simeon Fillmore	1823-1825
Otis R. Hopkins	1826-1828
Benjamin Bivins	1829
John Brown	1830-1832
Benjamin Bivins	1833-1835
Levi Goodrich	1836
Amos Wright	1837
Thomas Durboraw	1838-1841
Archibald Thompson	1842
O. Woeben	1843
Archibald Thompson	1844
Orsamus Warren	1845
Thomas Durboraw	1846
Archibald Thompson	1847
Orsamus Warren	1848-1849
Thomas Durboraw	1850
Archibald Thompson	1851
James D. Warren	1852-1855
H. S. Cunningham	1856-1859
David Woodward	1860-1864
Livingston Wiltse	1865
Jacob Eshelman	1866-1872
Livingston Wiltse	1873
James Magoffin	1874
John Kraus	1875-1878
Lyman Parker	1879-1880
Livingston Wiltse	1881-1885
Jacob Humbert	1886-1889
Theodore Krehbiel	1890-1919
John Lapp	1919-1939
Karl T. Krehbiel	1940-1954

== Communities and locations ==
=== Communities ===
Principal locations or settlements in the town are:

- Beeman Creek Park is an undeveloped county park in the northeast part of the town.
- Clarence (also called "Clarence Hollow", or just "The Hollow") is in the southeast and is a census-designated place. This is an extensive community of homes and businesses. The Clarence Historical Society is located on Main Street in this community. Part of the community is within a small valley which is traversed by Ransom Creek. The seat of the town government is in the Clarence postal zone, just south of the hamlet of Clarence Center. During the time of its founding, Clarence village was called "Pine Grove" and later "Ransomville." There was also a stop on the West Shore Railroad from 1884 to 1960. The stop on the West Shore Railroad was named the "Clarence Station."
- Clarence Aerodrome (D51) is a small, grass-strip airport in the northwest part of the town. This is a private general aviation airport. It was known earlier as "Steffan Airport".
- Clarence Center (formerly "Van Tines Corners") lies near the middle of the town. It is a small hamlet (and census-designated place) with the most densely populated neighborhood situated around the intersection of Goodrich Road and Clarence Center Road. Clarence Center is also a postal ZIP code 14032, covering most of the north part of the town.
- East Amherst (formerly "Transit Station") is an unincorporated community, or hamlet, on the west side of the town that is mostly in the town of Amherst. East Amherst is also a postal zone (ZIP code 14051).
- Escarpment Sanctuary is a small nature preserve located on Greiner Road that is losing land to the upscale Spaulding Lake development.
- Gunnville is a former railroad station in the south part of the town, now only remembered as the source of the name for Gunnville Road.
- Harris Hill is an extensive community (a census-designated place) in the southwest corner of the town, built on a low hill of the same name. This location was also called "Shimerville" after a former post office, now only remembered as the source of the name for Shimerville Road.
- Hunts Corners is a location near the eastern town line and consists of a scattered group of homes. The corners are formed by the intersection of Salt Road and Clarence Center-Akron Road. The First Baptist Church of Clarence is located in Hunts Corners.
- Mansfield Corners is a former location in the eastern part of the town, north of Hunts Corners.
- Millersport is a hamlet in the northwest corner of the town. Millersport extends into the town of Amherst and also across Tonawanda Creek into Niagara County. The primary settlement consists of residences and businesses near the intersection of Transit Road and Millersport Highway.
- Potoczek Airport (D46) is a small grass-strip airport in the northwest part of the town, located on Wolcott Road.
- Rapids is a hamlet at the northern town line. Rapids is officially in Niagara County, but partly extends into Erie County, divided by Tonawanda Creek.
- Rock Oak Estates is a 55+ community located on Main Street in Clarence.
- Smiths Corners is a former location in the northern part of the town near Rapids.
- Snearly Corners is now the intersection of Main Street and Transit Road. It was named after the Snearly family, which ran a hotel there.
- Spaulding Lake is an upscale housing project built around a former quarry, located north of Main Street.
- Sturnerville is an historic location east of Harris Hill.
- Swormville is on the western border of the town and extends across the border into the town of Amherst. The community has had its name spelled several different ways in the past, such as "Schwarmsville".
- Tillman Road Wildlife Management Area is a conservation area in the southeast part of Clarence.
- Wolcottsburg (once called "West Prussia") is a hamlet in the northern part of the town, centered about a cluster of businesses, homes, and a church. The community is located near the intersection of Goodrich Road and Wolcott Road. It was once the demographic and economic center of Clarence, although hard times have hit the community and only two businesses remain.

=== Physiographic locations ===
- Beeman Creek is a small stream in the northeast part of Clarence, flowing northward to Tonawanda Creek.
- Black Creek is a stream running mostly east–west through the northern part of the town, starting near Wolcottsburg, and eventually merging into Tonawanda Creek in northern Amherst.
- The Escarpment is a ledge, part of the Onondaga Escarpment, running approximately east–west south of the middle of the town and most prominent between Goodrich Road and Kraus Road.
- Gott Creek is a stream in the southeast part of Clarence that flows west into Amherst.
- Ransom Creek is a stream in the south central part of Clarence that flows west into Amherst.
- Spaulding Lake is a former quarry north of Main Street, previously known as Quarry Lake.

== Cultural institutions ==
- Museum of European Art – contains work by Salvador Dalí, Pablo Picasso, Arno Breher and Paul Belmondo
- Clarence Historical Society Museum – A History Museum, currently containing exhibits on the Western New York Railroading, Model Aviation, Norman Rockwell, the Buffalo Truck Company, and Wilson Greatbatch

== Education ==
Most of the town is served by the Clarence Central School District, which contains one high school (Clarence High School), one middle school (Clarence Middle School), and four elementary schools (Clarence Center, Harris Hill, Ledgeview, and Sheridan Hill).

A portion is in Williamsville Central School District

Nativity of the Blessed Virgin Mary Church Elementary School in Harris Hill offers K-8 Catholic education, now with a 3-4 year old pre-school program. St. Mary's School in Swormville offers K-8 Catholic education and a certified Montessori program starting at age 3. Both are Parish schools operating under the authority of the Roman Catholic Diocese of Buffalo.

== Notable residents ==
- Kevyn Adams, former assistant coach and former General Manager (2020–2025) for the Buffalo Sabres
- Dave Andreychuk, NHL left winger for 24 years, formerly of the Toronto Maple Leafs, New Jersey Devils, Boston Bruins, Colorado Avalanche, Tampa Bay Lightning, and most notably the Buffalo Sabres
- Joan Baez, folk musician of the 1960s, spent some of her childhood in Clarence Center and attended Clarence Center School
- Alfred F. Beiter, former US Congressman
- Bill Bernhard, born in Clarence, major league baseball player
- Martin Biron, hockey goaltender, formerly of the Buffalo Sabres hockey club
- Archibald S. Clarke, former US Congressman
- Jane Corwin, New York State Assemblywoman
- Experience Estabrook, attorney general of the Territory of Nebraska
- Bob Froese, former goaltender for the Philadelphia Flyers and the New York Rangers hockey clubs
- Jeff Glor, television journalist/anchor
- Dudley Hart, professional golfer
- Neil Haskell, top-4 finalist of So You Think You Can Dance (Season 3) and an original cast member of the Broadway musical Hamilton: An American Musical
- Emory William Hunt, former President of Bucknell University
- Dewitt C. Leach, former US Congressman
- Chris Lee, former US Congressman
- Katie MacFarlane, former professional women's basketball player
- Pam MacKinnon, Tony Award-winning director
- Chad Michael Murray, television and movie star who attended Clarence High School. On the television show One Tree Hill, a picture is shown of Lucas Scott, Chad Michael Murray's character, wearing a Clarence football jersey as a little boy.
- John Neumann, original parish priest of St. Mary's in Swormville, first American bishop to be canonized
- Teppo Numminen, former defenseman and assistant coach of the Buffalo Sabres hockey club
- Joyce Carol Oates, author (lived in Millersport)
- Jack Phillips, former MLB first baseman and attended Lancaster High School
- Jason Pominville, retired National Hockey League player
- Jon Powers, Congressional candidate and veteran
- Jason Rebrovich, Green Bay Packers assistant coach
- Darcy Regier, former general manager of the Buffalo Sabres
- Thomas M. Reynolds, former U.S. Congressman
- Lindy Ruff, longtime Buffalo Sabres player and head coach
- John Valby, musician and comedian
- Thomas Vanek, retired National Hockey League player.
- Ernst Volgenau, farm boy, USAF officer, engineer, founder of SRA International company, benefactor of George Mason University
- Patrick Wilson, drummer for the band Weezer, attended Clarence High School

== Sister city ==
- Tianjin, China (since November 10, 2001)
