= Wolcottsburg, New York =

Hamlet in New York, United States

Coordinates: 42°03′29″N 78°38′13″W

Wolcottsburg is a hamlet in the town of Clarence in Erie County, New York, United States.

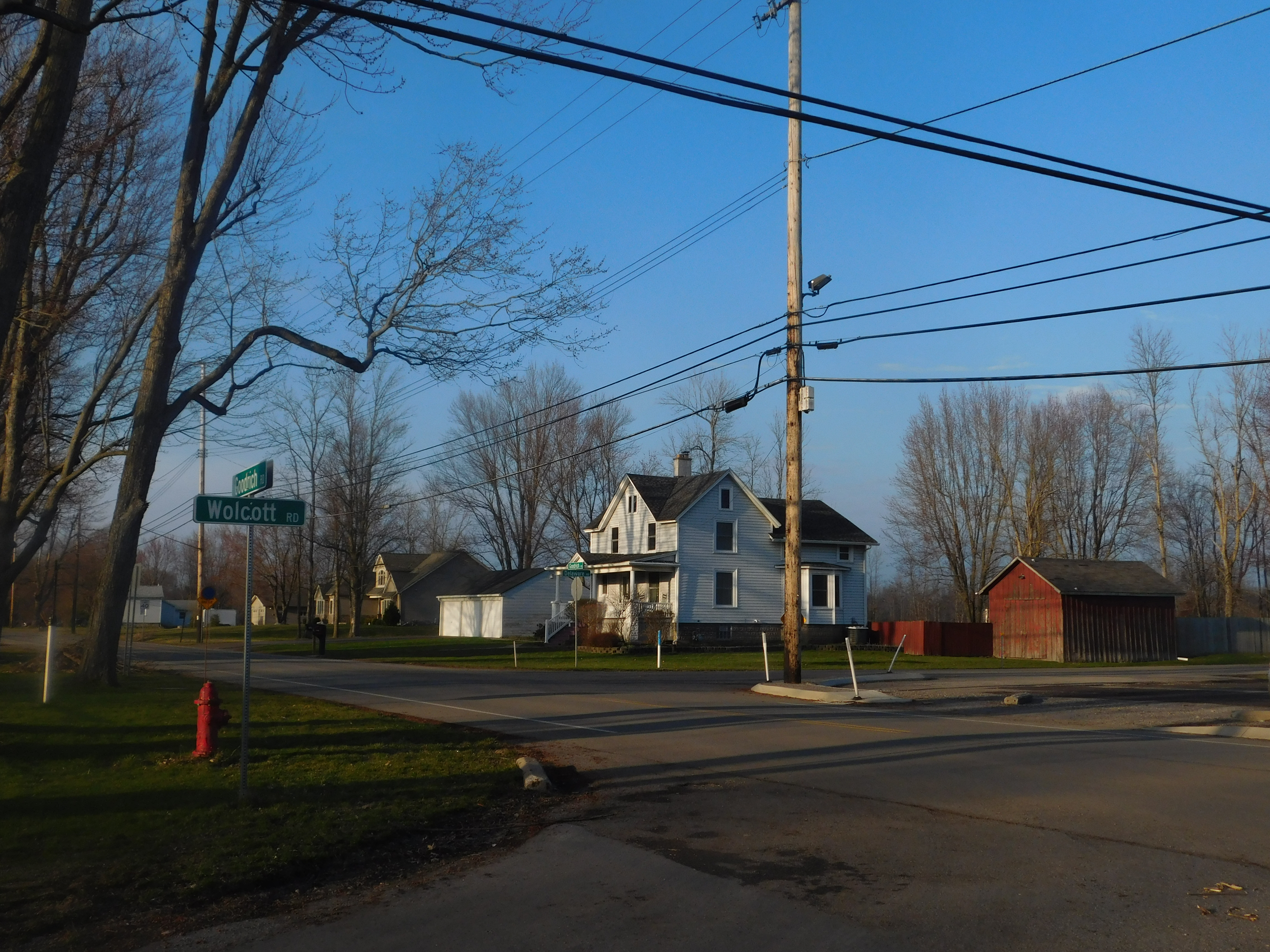
Wolcottsburg in March 2021

== History ==
The settlement was originally known as West Prussia due to the large number of Prussian inhabitants. There is a German Lutheran church at the end of Wolcott Road that was constructed in 1873 and still stands today.

After hard times hit the community, Marvin's Bar & Grill is now the sole remaining business in Wolcottsburg, although there were once two stores and a hotel.

== Geography ==
A small stream, known as Black Creek, runs through the town and ends just after Goodrich Road.

There is a small airstrip located in the western portion of the hamlet.
