= Mighty Taco =

American restaurant chain

- Company type: Private
- Industry: Fast food
- Founded: Buffalo, New York, U.S. (1973; 53 years ago)
- Founder: Dan Scepkowski; Andy Gerovac; Ken Koczur; Bruce Robertson
- Headquarters: East Amherst, New York, U.S.
- Number of locations: 19
- Area served: Western New York
- Products: Tacos, burritos, fajitas,
- Owner: Dan Scepkowski
- Number of employees: ~650
- Website: mightytaco.com

Mighty Taco is a Mexican-style fast-food restaurant chain in the Buffalo, New York, United States, area. Mighty Taco restaurants are owned and operated by Mighty Taco Inc., a privately owned corporation. The Super Mighty, El Niño Burrito, Roastitios and Buffitos are signature products of Mighty Taco. Other menu items include tacos, burritos, fajitas and nachos, as well as vegetarian and meatless options.

== History ==
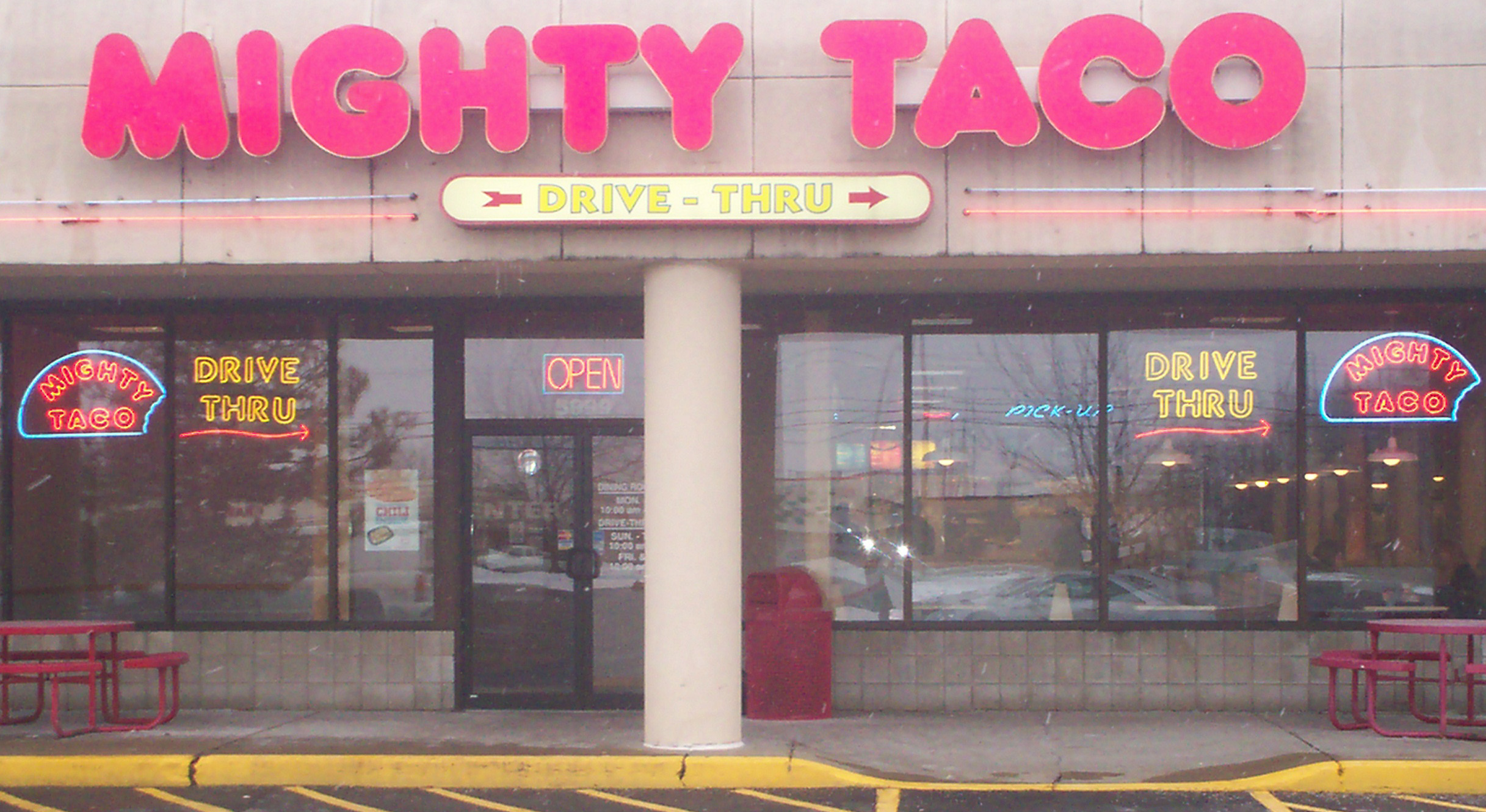
Original Mighty Taco sign, 1975

The first Mighty Taco opened at 1247 Hertel Avenue in Buffalo, on August 31, 1973. There were four owners: Dan Scepkowski, Andy Gerovac, Ken Koczur and Bruce Robertson. Dan Scepkowski is the current owner of the company, having bought out the other founders. As of December 2021, Mighty Taco had 19 locations throughout the Western New York region.

In April 2012, Mighty Taco opened its second location outside the Buffalo market in the Rochester, New York, area (the first one outside the Buffalo market since the closure of the Fredonia, New York, location in 2003). On June 16, 2014, the second Rochester area location opened in Greece. The Greece location was closed as of July 10, 2017. The Henrietta location was closed as of October 1, 2018. On January 25, 2016, the first Mighty Taco in the Syracuse area opened in Cicero. The Cicero location was closed as of December 30, 2016.

On August 31, 2013, Mighty Taco marked its 40th anniversary.

In mid-March 2020, all locations abandoned dine-in service, due to the COVID-19 pandemic. It was reinstated by March 2021.

Until the pandemic, a location was based in the Erie County Medical Center's lobby with two other national fast food outlets. In general, those operations were criticized for being contrary to the health mission of a hospital.

== Fare ==
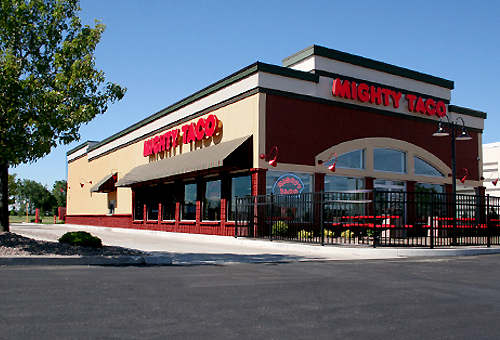
A Mighty Taco in Cheektowaga

=== Chow Down ordering service ===
On October 25, 2010, Mighty Taco began offering an online ordering service called "Chow Down", shipping Mighty Taco Beef and Cheese, or Bean and Cheese Burritos, to anywhere in the United States. This serves as a national catering service that ships the restaurant's food in bulk orders.

== Advertising ==
Mighty Taco is known for having unusual, somewhat surreal TV advertisements, created by Paragon Advertising (which went out of business in 2015). Several of these commercials are also designed to be permissible on commercial-free public television stations, and WNED-TV airs the advertisements when promoting Mighty Taco as a supporter. Their radio advertisements are usually parodies of popular culture, such as prescription drug commercials, with a non sequitur at the end of the commercial directing listeners to Mighty Taco.

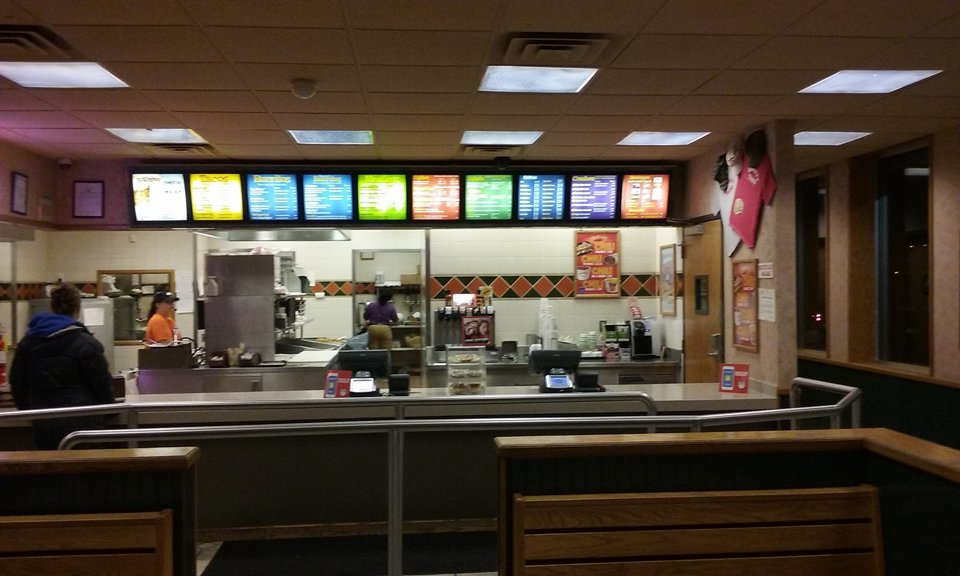
Inside of a Mighty Taco located on Delaware Avenue in Buffalo, New York

In April 2014, Mighty Taco earned international notoriety for their advertising campaign banning Russian President Vladimir Putin from the chain.
