= Buffalo Niagara Heritage Village =

- Location within New York
- Location: Amherst, New York USA
- Coordinates: 43.084192°N 78.728332°W
- Type: Open-air museum
- Collection size: 10 historic buildings, over 40,000 objects
- Director: Carrie Stiver
- Parking: On site (no charge)
- Website: bnhv.org

The Hoover House, one of Amherst Museum's historic buildings.

Buffalo Niagara Heritage Village is an open-air museum located in Amherst, New York. The Museum's mission is to preserve, interpret, and exhibit the agricultural history and rural heritage of the Buffalo Niagara region. A 35-acre (140,000 m^{2}) site, the Museum includes 10 historic buildings moved from their original sites, a main exhibit building, a collections storage facility, the Niederlander Research Library, and a Museum Store.

An educational institution, BNHV was chartered by the State of New York. Formed as a department of the Town of Amherst, the museum was privatized in January 2011. The name changed in 2012.

== Collections ==
Buffalo Niagara Heritage Village is home to a collection of over 40,000 items reflecting the agricultural, domestic, and industrial past of the Buffalo Niagara region. BNHV's collection is composed of artifacts representing the agricultural and industrial trades, heritage crafts, and material culture of 19th- and 20th-century Western New York. Ten historic buildings from the Town of Amherst have been relocated to the 35-acre campus and are available for self-guided and guided tours, which illustrate rural life in 19th-century Buffalo Niagara.

== Guilds ==
Buffalo Niagara Heritage Village offers membership to many robust and active guilds. Membership within our guilds offers opportunities for camaraderie, heritage skill building, and more.

== Events ==
Buffalo Niagara Heritage Village offers community events and workshops throughout the year.
