= Josh Thomas (defensive end) =

American football player (born 1981)

No. 91
- Position: Defensive end

Personal information
- Born: June 26, 1981 (age 45); Plymouth, Massachusetts, U.S.
- Listed height: 6 ft 6 in (1.98 m)
- Listed weight: 271 lb (123 kg)

Career information
- College: Syracuse
- NFL draft: 2004: undrafted

Career history
- Indianapolis Colts (2004–2009)

Awards and highlights
- Super Bowl champion (XLI)

Career NFL statistics
- Total tackles: 123
- Sacks: 6
- Forced fumbles: 1
- Fumble recoveries: 1
- Pass deflections: 4
- Stats at Pro Football Reference

Joshua Lloyd Thomas (born June 26, 1981) is an American former professional football player who was a defensive end for the Indianapolis Colts of the National Football League (NFL). He played college football for the Syracuse Orange and was signed by the Colts as an undrafted free agent in 2004. He later won Super Bowl XLI with them, defeating the Chicago Bears.

== Early life ==
Thomas attended Orchard Park High School in Orchard Park, New York, and played tight end and defensive end. As a senior in 1999, he set a New York State sack record with 23.5 sacks in an 11-game season.

== College career ==
Thomas was a three-year starter at Syracuse University who opened 34 of 36 career games and had 124 career tackles, nine sacks, 23 tackles for losses and two interceptions. In his collegiate debut, he recorded a sack and an interception in a 63–7 win over Buffalo. Thomas started 13 games as a sophomore and posted 46 tackles, seven for losses, and 15 pressures. He started 11 games as a senior, 10 games as a junior when he led DL with six passes defensed and was third on line with 33 tackles and second on the team with eight QB pressures.

== Professional career ==
After going unselected in the 2004 NFL draft, Thomas signed as an undrafted free agent with the Indianapolis Colts on April 26, 2004. As a rookie, he played in the first 11 games before sustaining a season-ending knee injury at Detroit on November 2, 2004. Thomas had 18 tackles, 11 solo, one sack, four pressures and one forced fumble. In 2005, he started two of 12 games at DE and had 29 tackles, 19 solo, eight pressures and three sacks. In 2006, he saw action in 14 games and made 35 tackles, 29 solo, one sack and one fumble recovery. In 2007, he started seven of 15 games, five at LDE and two at RDE, filling in for injured Dwight Freeney and made career-high 55 tackles, 33 solo, 1.0 sack, 14 pressures, one forced fumble and three passes batted. In 2008, he started three of 16 games and had 35 tackles, 26 solo, five pressures and one batted pass.

Thomas was released after the 2008 season. The Colts re-signed him on August 18, 2009. He was re-signed during the season but released again on November 11.

In 2022 Thomas was named by the Indianapolis Star as the best Colt to wear number 91.
