= Swormville, New York =

Hamlet in New York, United States

Coordinates: 43°02′18″N 78°41′50″W

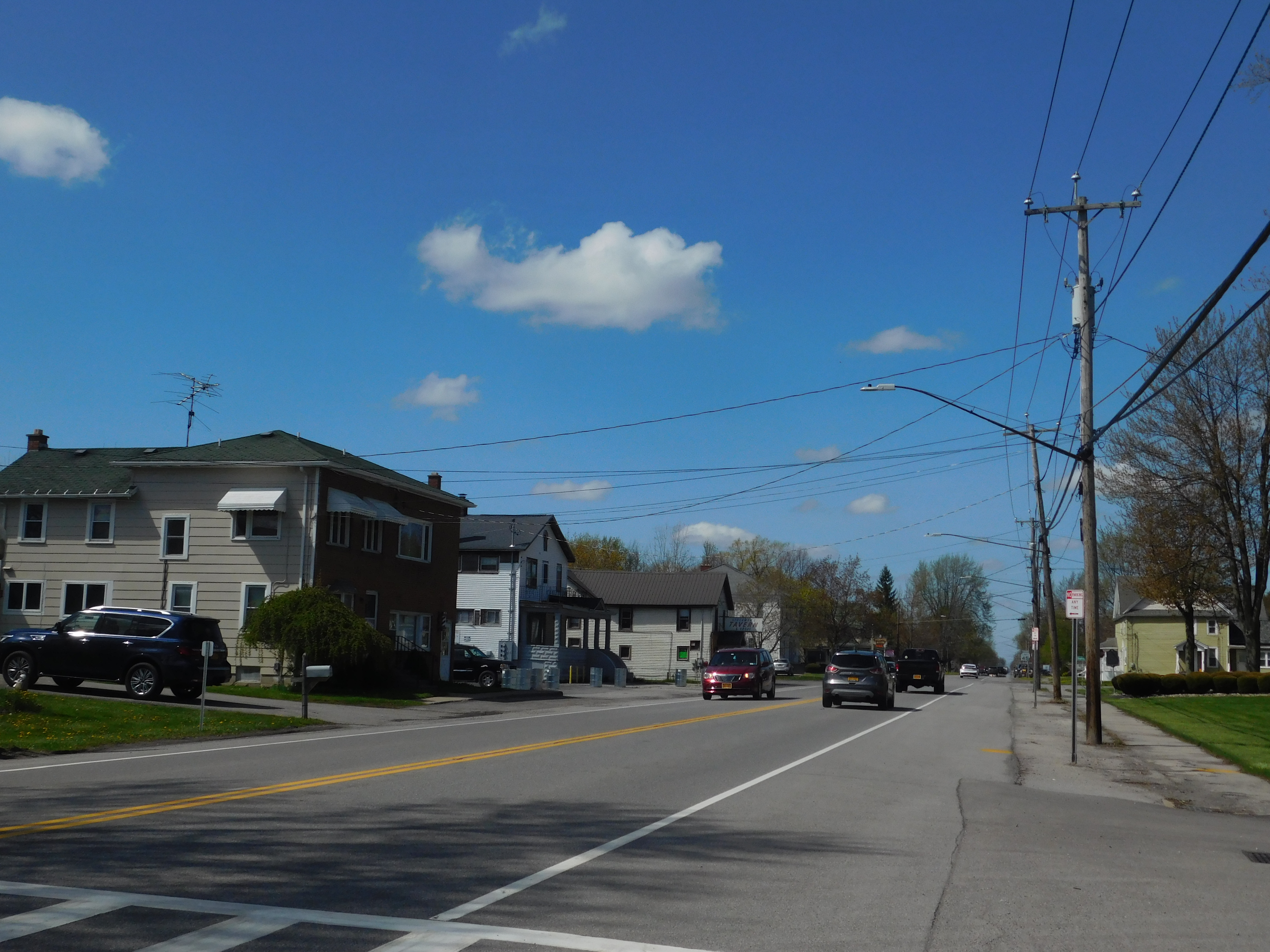
NY 78 northbound in Swormville

Swormville is a hamlet in the eastern part of Amherst and the western part of Clarence, New York, United States.

Named after Adam Schworm, a prominent landowner and businessman who built a store on the Clarence side of Transit Road, Swormville has a population of 17,694. Swormville was originally dubbed "Schwormville," and has also been occasionally referred to as "Swormsville."

== History ==
Bavarian and French immigrants began settling in the Swormville area during the late 1830s following a heavy migration of German people and the subsequent separation of Alden and Newstead. The Rev. John Neumann, a Catholic missionary, founded the "Parish of the Transit", now known as St. Mary's. He used to walk to Swormville from his headquarters in Williamsville. Immigrants from Palma and Motavia began to settle in the area in the 1800s.

== Geography ==
The community is bisected by Transit Road, NY Route 78, an important north-south highway.

Swormville is located in Erie County of Western New York and is northeast of Buffalo.

== Schools ==
St. Mary's School, with students in pre-kindergarten through grade eight, is a Catholic private school and the only school located in Swormville.

The public school system is Williamsville.
