= Orchard Park High School =

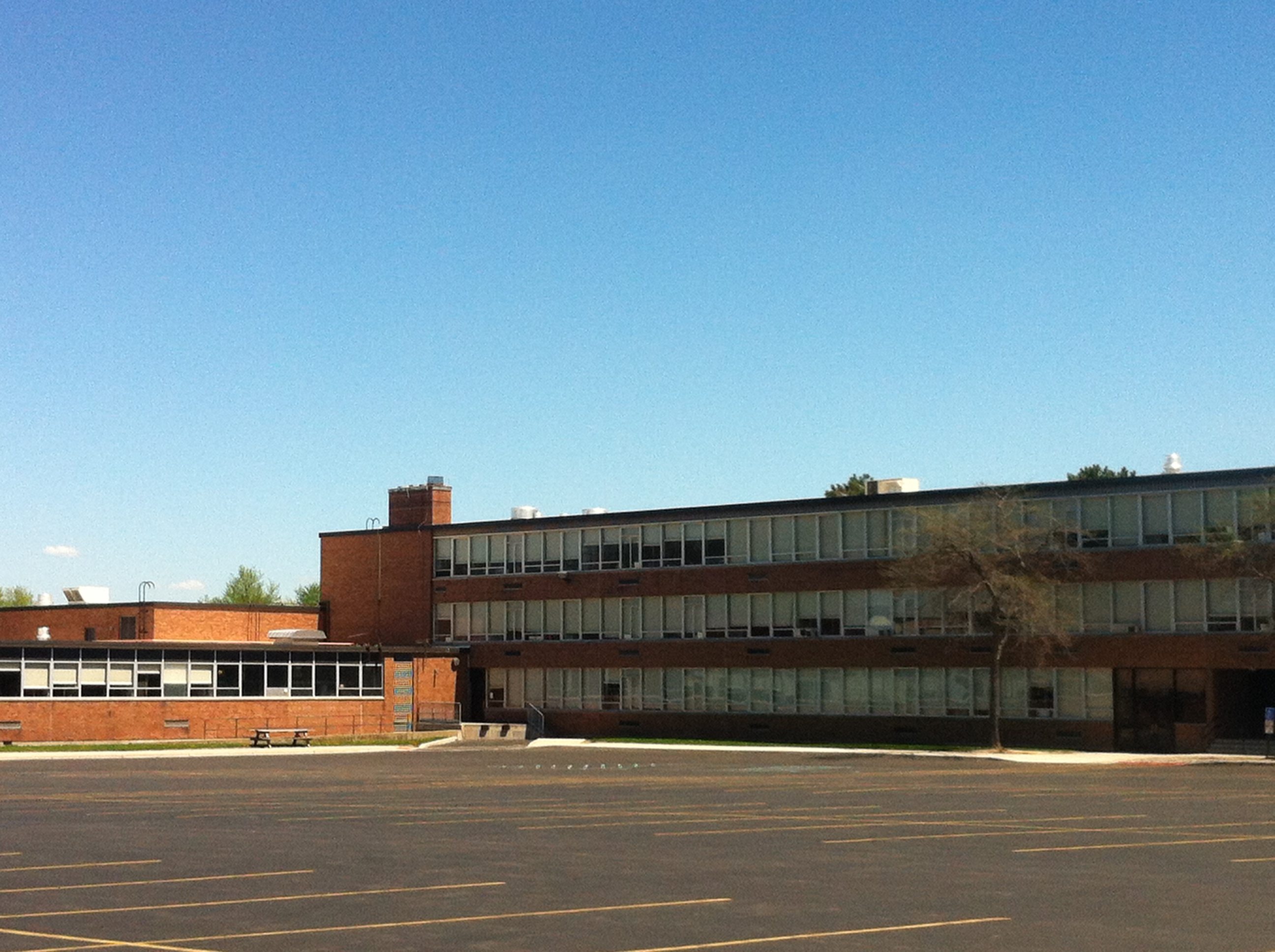

Location
- 4040 Baker Road; Orchard Park, New York 14127; United States; 42°46′25″N 78°43′48″W

Information
- School district: Orchard Park Central School District
- CEEB code: 334325
- Principal: Alexis Langheier
- Teaching staff: 118.73 (FTE) (as of 2023)
- Grades: 9-12
- Enrollment: 1,488 (as of 2023)
- Student to teacher ratio: 11.70 (as of 2023)
- Colors: Maroon and White
- Athletics: NYSPHSAA Section 6
- Mascot: Opie the Quaker
- Team name: Quakers
- Newspaper: The Voice
- Yearbook: The Quaker
- Website: OPHS

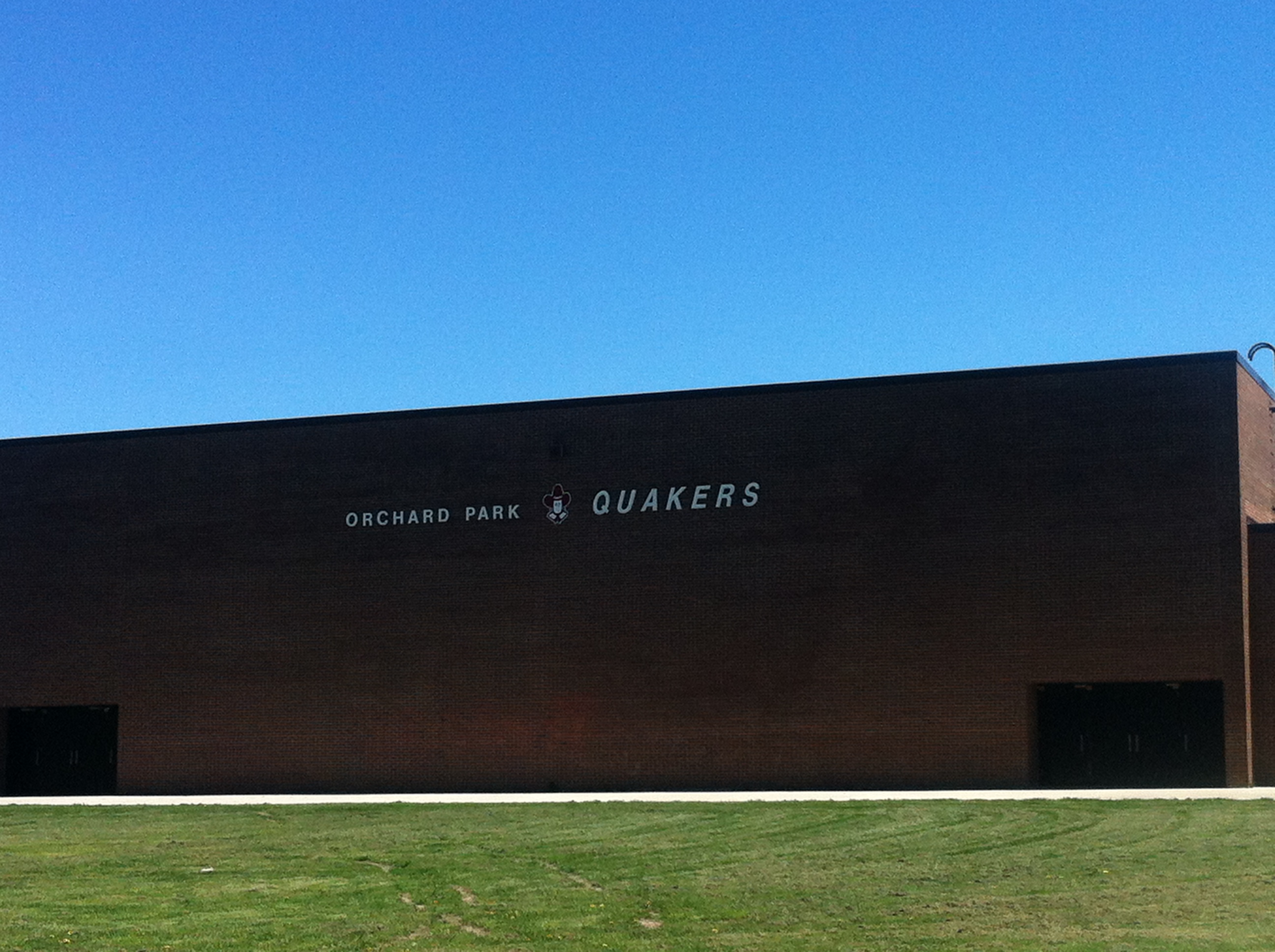
Orchard Park High's gymnasium

Orchard Park High School is a secondary school in Orchard Park, New York. The school has approximately 1725 children in grades 9–12. The students are divided among three houses with a principal for each house and a principal who oversees the entire school.

Orchard Park High School was recognized by the National Blue Ribbon Schools Program in 2016.

== History and Description of Campus ==
The main portion of the current high school building was completed in 1960 and served until 1976 as the junior high school. In 1976, a large addition and renovation process doubled the size of the building, and it became the high school. The old junior high gym became the pool and the gym was added adjacent to it. Also built was a three-story classroom addition and an auditorium adjacent to the original building. (The former high school became a middle school, which currently houses grades 6–8.) A common complaint regarding the building's design is that the narrowest staircase (capable of fitting only two people abreast) is in a central location; heavy between-period traffic often becomes congested in a bottleneck. The building had undergone only minimal refurbishment and changes since the late 1970s until the summer of 2008. Further facility improvement is taking place, which started in April 2023.

=== 2008-2010 Renovations ===
In 2008 renovations began in the science wing, the auditorium, the locker rooms, and turned the stage in the cafeteria into the new weight room. The old weight room is now a technology room. The Freeman entrance was also renovated, adding a larger hallway to the exit as well as a handicap ramp. All the renovations were complete by September 2010.

=== 2023-2025 Renovations ===
In 2023, the district announced their "Investing in Our Future" plan which involved plans for renovating and replacing facilities across the district, including at the high school. The high school renovations include replacement of the athletic field turf, relocation and installment of new bleachers and press boxes around the turf, relocation and installment of a new field house/concession stand, installing new drainage to the practice football field, adding new band rooms and an elevator to the music wing, removing part of the parking lot for a new soccer field, additions to the swimming pool (including changes to the pool, locker rooms, fitness/weight room, and spectator seating), and adding new parking near the pool. The high school renovations are expected to be completed by 2025, with the remaining changes across the district to be completed by 2026.

== School District ==
Orchard Park High School is part of the Orchard Park Central School District, which encompasses students from towns and villages including, Orchard Park, North Boston, Colden, West Falls, and Blasdell.

The school district is broken into 4 elementary schools: Ellicott, South Davis, Eggert, and Windom.

== Curriculum ==
Orchard Park High School offers courses in Art, Business, Math, Science, English, Social Studies, Physical Education, Foreign Language, Technology, Career and Technological Education, and Music. It offers 14 Advanced Placement courses: AP World History, AP European History, AP US History, AP US Government and Politics, AP Macroeconomics, AP Calculus, (AB and BC) AP Latin, AP Spanish, AP French Language, AP Physics, AP Chemistry, AP Computer Science, AP Music Theory, AP English Language and Composition, and AP English Literature and Composition.

== Extracurricular Activities ==
(As of 2024) Student groups, organizations, and activities include Art Club, Aviation Club, Board Game Club, Book Club, Cancer Awareness Club, Chess Club, Computer Club, DECA, Destination Imagination, Drama Club, French Club, Société Honoraire de Français, Gender Equality Club, The Gingerbread House Club, Grammar Club, GSA, History Club, International Club, Latin National Honors Society, Masterminds, Math / Physics Society, Media Productions Club, Medical career Interest Group, Mock Trial Club, Model U.N. Club, National Honor Society, OP Impact, OP Educational Outreach, OP Pride, Pep Club, The Pulse, Racial Equity Alliance, S.A.V.E, Science Club, Sign Language Club, Spanish Culture Club, Spanish National Honor Society, S.T.E.M. Club, Sustainability Club, Technology Club, Tri-M Music Society, Varsity Club, The VOICE, Wellness Club, and Yearbook Club. The school also has an interactive student, teacher, parent, and administrator government program known as STAP-Comm.

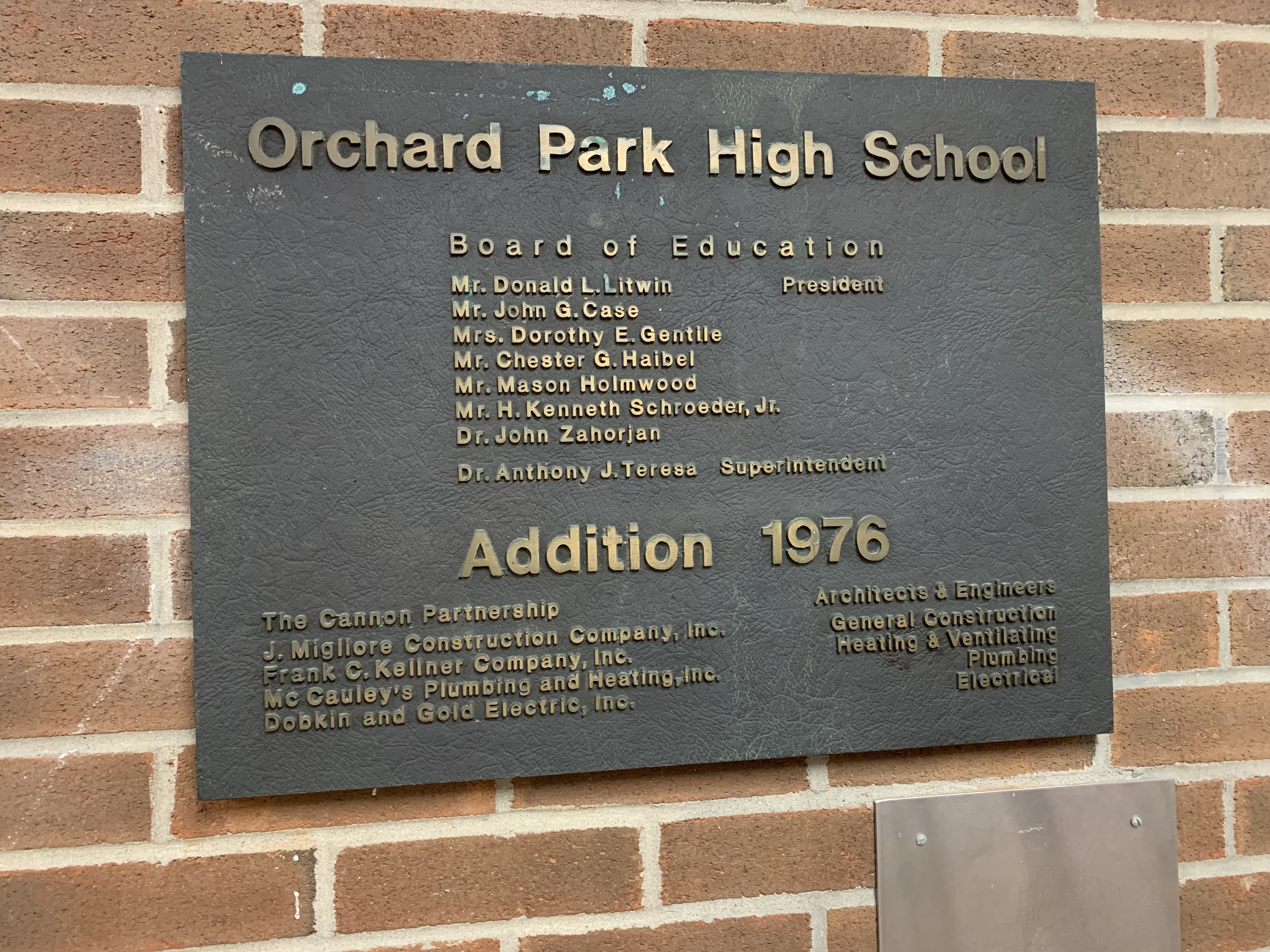
1976 Addition Plaque

=== Athletics ===
Athletic opportunities include Cross-country, indoor track and field, outdoor track and field, softball (2015 Class AA State Champions and 2016 Class AA State Finalists), football (2008 and 2011 Class AA State Champions), wrestling (three wrestlers qualified for us nationals 2012), baseball (1988 New York State Class A Champions) basketball (2010 ECIC Division I Regular Season Champions), archery, swimming and diving (1999-2000 New York State Champions), rifle, bowling, tennis, lacrosse, field hockey, cheer leading, gymnastics, golf (2013-2017 ECIC Team Champions), varsity hockey (2019 Section VI, Far west Regional Champions), club hockey (winner of the last eight "Super Thursdays" for the Southtowns Club Hockey League), and volleyball.

=== Performing Arts ===
Orchard Park is home to the Quaker Marching Band (2007 New York State Field Band Conference Champions), and several additional ensembles including Wind Ensemble, Symphonic Band, Checkmates, Jazz Ensemble, String Orchestra, Full Orchestra, Swing Chorus, Choraliers, Mixed Chorus and Girls' Chorus. Students at Orchard Park High School can also participate in a strong theatrical program well known for their musicals and dramas. In spring of 2014, the Drama Club presented Les Misérables (musical) and received Kenny Awards for Outstanding Production, Rising Star, Best Actor in a Supporting Role, Best Actress in a Supporting Role, and Best Orchestral Performance. The Drama Department also was nominated again in 2017 for their production of Stephen Sondheim's Into the Woods winning for Best Orchestral Performance and Best Scenic Design, whilst still being nominated for Best Costume Design, Best Technical Design and Best Actor in a Supporting Role.

== School Spirit and Traditions ==
The school mascot is Opie the Quaker. The school colors are maroon and white.

=== Homecoming Week ===
Like most schools, O.P.H.S. has a school spirit week on the week before homecoming, with themes such as neon day and school spirit day. On Friday of spirit week the school has a pep rally and a powderpuff flag football game which features the junior girls versus the senior girls. On Saturday of that week there is a parade in the morning, the varsity football game in the afternoon, and the homecoming dance later that night.

=== Faculty Basketball Game ===
In previous years, an annual Faculty Basketball Game was hosted to boost school spirit and to fund raise for charity. Faculty members were drafted to play for one of four teams that correspond with grades 9–12, with the first selection given to the class that raised the most money that year. The event was best known for its electric atmosphere with participating teachers and staff having nicknames like "Crusher" to pump up the crowd. In 2008, legendary football coach Gene Tundo made a dramatic 10 point half-court shot in the waning moments to propel the underdog Freshmen over the Seniors.

== School Media ==
O.P.H.S has social media platforms on Instagram and YouTube. On the school's YouTube account, the school's morning announcements are live streamed along with (as of 2025) local sport reports, fun facts, and short skits made by the students and staff. Various sports and clubs associated with the school also have their own social media accounts on X (formally Twitter), Instagram, and YouTube.

O.P.H.S also has their own newspaper, newsletter, magazine, and yearbook. The Voice is the school's online newspaper written by students, which features various articles ranging from local sports to student photography. The Quaker Gazette is the school's monthly newsletter that features announcements, news, and reminders. The Pulse is the school's annual magazine released every June, which features poetry, stories, pictures, and artwork from students. The Quaker is the school's yearbook released every June, which features highlights of the year, including (but not limited to) students/faculty, clubs, events, and sports.

== Notable alumni ==
- Chuck Bullough, former NFL player, Syracuse Defensive Coordinator
- Jim Burt, former NFL player
- Jon Corto, Former NFL special teams player, Buffalo Bills
- Brian Dux, BBL MVP
- Dave Hollins, Former MLB third baseman, now Baltimore Orioles scout
- Rick James, American singer-songwriter, multi-instrumentalist and producer.
- John Koelmel, Former CEO of First Niagara Bank
- Larry Pfohl (Lex Luger), professional wrestler
- Ron Pitts, former NFL player, now NFL on FOX Sports broadcaster
- William Sadler, Saturn Award-winning actor
- Todd Schlopy, former NFL player, Buffalo Bills
- Josh Thomas, Indianapolis Colts defensive end
- Craig Wolfley, former NFL player, brother of Ron Wolfley.
- Ron Wolfley, former NFL player, brother of Craig Wolfley.
- Tim Bender, Snowmobile Hall of Fame member.
