= North Bailey, New York =

Hamlet in New York, United States

Coordinates: 42°59′26″N 78°48′16″W

North Bailey is a hamlet in the town of Amherst in Erie County, New York, United States.
