= Former Reformed Mennonite Church =

Historic church in New York, United States

- U.S. National Register of Historic Places
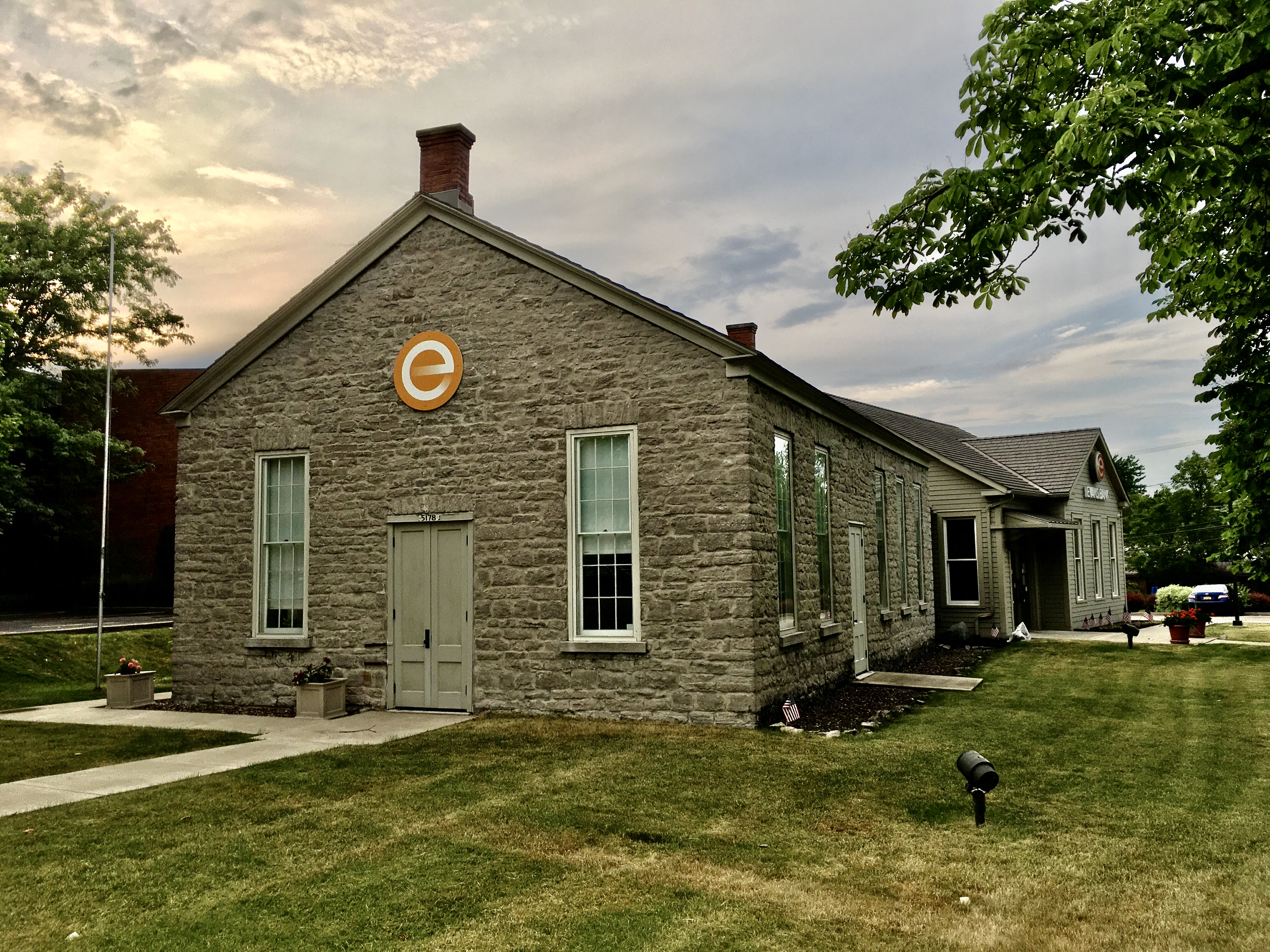
- Former Reformed Mennonite Church, June 2020

- Location within New York Location within the United States
- Nearest city: Williamsville, New York
- Coordinates: 42°57′39″N 78°45′35″W
- Built: 1834
- Architectural style: Greek Revival
- NRHP reference No.: 03000596
- Added to NRHP: July 03, 2003

Former Reformed Mennonite Church is a historic Reformed Mennonite church located at Amherst, New York in Erie County, New York. It is a Greek Revival style structure constructed in 1834. It served as a house of worship until 1981. It is now occupied by an Evans Bank branch.

It was listed on the National Register of Historic Places in 2003.
