= North Java, New York =

- Hamlet
- Location within New York Location within the United States
- Coordinates: 42°41′01″N 78°20′16″W
- Country: United States
- State: New York
- County: Wyoming
- Elevation: 1,562 ft (476 m)
- Time zone: UTC-5 (Eastern (EST))
  - Summer (DST): UTC-4 (EDT)
- ZIP code: 14113
- Area code: 585
- GNIS feature ID: 958831

North Java is a hamlet in Wyoming County, New York, United States. The community is located along New York State Route 98, 11.1 miles (17.9 km) west-southwest of Warsaw. North Java has a post office with ZIP code 14113, which opened on July 29, 1845.
