= Clarence (CDP), New York =

Clarence, New York
- Census-designated place
- Location in Erie County and the state of New York
- Coordinates: 42°58′49″N 78°35′30″W
- Country: United States
- State: New York
- County: Erie
- Town: Clarence

Area
  - Total: 2.91 sq mi (7.53 km^{2})
  - Land: 2.85 sq mi (7.37 km^{2})
  - Water: 0.066 sq mi (0.17 km^{2})
- Elevation: 705 ft (215 m)

Population (2020)
  - Total: 2,733
  - Density: 961.0/sq mi (371.04/km^{2})
- Time zone: UTC-5 (Eastern (EST))
  - Summer (DST): UTC-4 (EDT)
- ZIP Code: 14031
- Area code: 716
- FIPS code: 36-15814
- GNIS feature ID: 0946735

Clarence is a hamlet and census-designated place (CDP) within the highly affluent and rapidly growing town of Clarence in Erie County, New York, United States. The population was 2,646 at the 2010 census.

Clarence is part of the Buffalo-Niagara Falls metropolitan area.

== Geography ==
The Clarence CDP is located at 42°58′49″N 78°35′30″W (42.98054, -78.59177), in the southeastern part of the town of Clarence. New York State Route 5, Main Street, passes east–west through the center of the CDP.

The hamlet is also called "Clarence Hollow", or just "The Hollow", due its location centered at the base of an indentation in the Onondaga Escarpment formed by Ransom Creek. The Clarence Historical Society is located on Main Street. During the time of its founding, Clarence village was called "Pine Grove" and later "Ransomville".

According to the United States Census Bureau, the CDP has a total area of 2.91 square miles (7.54 km^{2}), of which 2.85 square miles (7.37 km^{2}) is land and 0.066 square miles (0.17 km^{2}), or 2.23%, is water.

== Demographics ==
Historical population
| Census | Pop. | Note | %± |
|---|---|---|---|
| 2020 | 2,733 | | — |
U.S. Decennial Census

== Education ==
The CDP is within the Clarence Central School District.
