= List of places in New York: O =

This list of current cities, towns, unincorporated communities, counties, and other recognized places in the U.S. state of New York also includes information on the number and names of counties in which the place lies, and its lower and upper zip code bounds, if applicable.

List of places in New York: A | B | C | D | E | F | G | H | I | J | K | L | M | N | O | P | Q | R | S | T | U | V | W | X | Y | Z

| Name of place | Counties | Principal county | Lower zip code | Upper zip code |
|---|---|---|---|---|
| Oak Beach | 1 | Suffolk County | 11702 | |
| Oakbrook | 1 | Rockland County | 10954 | |
| Oakdale | 1 | Broome County | 13790 | |
| Oakdale | 1 | Columbia County | | |
| Oakdale | 1 | Suffolk County | 11769 | |
| Oakes | 1 | Ulster County | | |
| Oakfield | 1 | Genesee County | 14125 | |
| Oakfield | 1 | Genesee County | | |
| Oak Hill | 1 | Greene County | 12460 | |
| Oak Hill | 1 | Washington County | | |
| Oakland | 1 | Livingston County | 14517 | |
| Oakland Gardens | 1 | Queens County | 11364 | |
| Oakland Valley | 1 | Sullivan County | | |
| Oak Orchard | 1 | Onondaga County | | |
| Oak Orchard | 1 | Orleans County | 14103 | |
| Oak Point | 1 | Bronx County | 10455 | |
| Oak Point | 1 | St. Lawrence County | 13646 | |
| Oak Ridge | 1 | Montgomery County | 12066 | |
| Oakridge | 1 | Onondaga County | 13088 | |
| Oaks Corners | 1 | Ontario County | 14518 | |
| Oak Summit | 1 | Dutchess County | 12545 | |
| Oaksville | 1 | Otsego County | 13337 | |
| Oakvale | 1 | St. Lawrence County | | |
| Oakville | 1 | Suffolk County | | |
| Oakwood | 1 | Cayuga County | 13021 | |
| Oakwood | 1 | Richmond County | 10301 | |
| Oakwood Beach | 1 | Richmond County | 10301 | |
| Oakwood Heights | 1 | Richmond County | 10301 | |
| Oakwood Heights Station | 1 | Richmond County | | |
| Oatka | 1 | Wyoming County | 14530 | |
| Obernburg | 1 | Sullivan County | 12767 | |
| Obi | 1 | Allegany County | 14715 | |
| Occanum | 1 | Broome County | 13865 | |
| Ocean Bay Park | 1 | Suffolk County | 11706 | |
| Ocean Beach | 1 | Suffolk County | 11770 | |
| Oceanside | 1 | Nassau County | 11572 | |
| Oceola Lake | 1 | Westchester County | | |
| Odell | 1 | Sullivan County | | |
| Odessa | 1 | Schuyler County | 14869 | |
| Ogden | 1 | Bronx County | 10452 | |
| Ogden | 1 | Monroe County | | |
| Ogden Center | 1 | Monroe County | | |
| Ogdensburg | 1 | St. Lawrence County | 13669 | |
| Ogdensburg International Airport | 1 | St. Lawrence County | | |
| Ohio | 1 | Herkimer County | 13324 | |
| Ohio | 1 | Herkimer County | | |
| Ohioville | 1 | Ulster County | 12561 | |
| Oil Springs Indian Reservation | 2 | Allegany County | 14081 | |
| Oil Springs Indian Reservation | 2 | Cattaraugus County | 14081 | |
| Oil Springs Indian Reservation | 1 | Allegany County | 14081 | |
| Oil Springs Indian Reservation | 1 | Cattaraugus County | 14081 | |
| Oklahoma | 1 | Monroe County | 14580 | |
| Oklahoma Beach | 1 | Monroe County | | |
| Olcott | 1 | Niagara County | 14126 | |
| Old Bethpage | 1 | Nassau County | 11804 | |
| Old Bethpage Branch | 1 | Nassau County | 11804 | |
| Old Brookville | 1 | Nassau County | 11545 | |
| Old Campbellwood Wye | 1 | Lewis County | | |
| Old Central Bridge | 1 | Schoharie County | 12035 | |
| Old Chatham | 1 | Columbia County | 12136 | |
| Old Chelsa | 1 | New York County | 10011 | |
| Old City | 1 | Herkimer County | | |
| Old De Kalb | 1 | St. Lawrence County | | |
| Old Field | 1 | Suffolk County | 11733 | |
| Old Field South | 1 | Suffolk County | 11790 | |
| Old Forge | 1 | Herkimer County | 13420 | |
| Old Forge-Thendara | 1 | Herkimer County | 13420 | |
| Old Mastic | 1 | Suffolk County | | |
| Old Northport | 1 | Nassau County | | |
| Old Orchard | 1 | Livingston County | 14487 | |
| Old Orchard Cove | 1 | Livingston County | | |
| Old Orchard Point | 1 | Livingston County | | |
| Old Town | 1 | Richmond County | | |
| Old Town Station | 1 | Richmond County | | |
| Old Village | 1 | Nassau County | 11023 | |
| Old Westbury | 1 | Nassau County | 11568 | |
| Olean | 1 | Cattaraugus County | 14760 | |
| Olean | 1 | Cattaraugus County | | |
| Olive | 1 | Ulster County | | |
| Olivebridge | 1 | Ulster County | 12461 | |
| Oliverea | 1 | Ulster County | 12410 | |
| Olmstedville | 1 | Essex County | 12857 | |
| Omar | 1 | Jefferson County | 13656 | |
| Omi | 1 | Columbia County | | |
| Omro | 1 | Cayuga County | | |
| Onativia | 1 | Onondaga County | 13084 | |
| Onchiota | 1 | Franklin County | 12968 | |
| Ondawa | 1 | Washington County | | |
| One Hundred Thirty Eighth | 1 | New York County | 10001 | |
| Oneida | 1 | Madison County | 13421 | |
| Oneida Castle | 1 | Oneida County | 13421 | |
| Oneida Corners | 1 | Warren County | | |
| Oneida County Airport | 1 | Oneida County | 13424 | |
| Oneida Indian Reservation | 1 | Madison County | | |
| Oneida Lake Beach East | 1 | Madison County | | |
| Oneida Lake Beach West | 1 | Madison County | | |
| Oneida Valley | 1 | Madison County | | |
| Oneonta | 1 | Otsego County | 13820 | |
| Oneonta | 1 | Otsego County | | |
| Onesquethaw | 1 | Albany County | 12067 | |
| Oniad Lake | 1 | Dutchess County | 12590 | |
| Oniontown | 1 | Dutchess County | | |
| Oniontown | 1 | Madison County | | |
| Onleys Station | 1 | Orange County | 10940 | |
| Onondaga | 1 | Onondaga County | 13215 | |
| Onondaga | 1 | Onondaga County | | |
| Onondaga Castle | 1 | Onondaga County | | |
| Onondaga Hill | 1 | Onondaga County | | |
| Onondaga Indian Reservation | 1 | Onondaga County | 13120 | |
| Onoville | 1 | Cattaraugus County | | |
| Ontario | 1 | Wayne County | 14519 | |
| Ontario | 1 | Wayne County | | |
| Ontario Beach | 1 | Monroe County | | |
| Ontario Center | 1 | Wayne County | 14520 | |
| Ontario on the Lake | 1 | Wayne County | 14519 | |
| Onteo Beach | 1 | Monroe County | | |
| Onteora Park | 1 | Greene County | 12485 | |
| Oot Park | 1 | Onondaga County | 13057 | |
| Open Meadows | 1 | Chautauqua County | 14710 | |
| Oppenheim | 1 | Fulton County | 13329 | |
| Oppenheim | 1 | Fulton County | | |
| Oquaga | 1 | Broome County | | |
| Oquaga Lake | 1 | Broome County | 13754 | |
| Oramel | 1 | Allegany County | 14711 | |
| Oran | 1 | Onondaga County | 13125 | |
| Orange | 1 | Schuyler County | | |
| Orangeburg | 1 | Rockland County | 10962 | |
| Orange Lake | 1 | Orange County | 12550 | |
| Orangeport | 1 | Niagara County | 14067 | |
| Orangetown | 1 | Rockland County | | |
| Orangeville | 1 | Wyoming County | | |
| Orangeville Center | 1 | Wyoming County | 14011 | |
| Orangeville Corners | 1 | Wyoming County | 14167 | |
| Orchard Knoll | 1 | Chemung County | 14845 | |
| Orchard Park | 1 | Erie County | 14127 | |
| Orchard Park | 1 | Erie County | | |
| Orchard Terrace | 1 | Chautauqua County | | |
| Orchard Village | 1 | Onondaga County | 13031 | |
| Oregon | 1 | Fulton County | | |
| Oregon | 1 | Suffolk County | 11952 | |
| Oregon | 1 | Warren County | | |
| Orient | 1 | Suffolk County | 11957 | |
| Orienta | 1 | Westchester County | 10543 | |
| Oriental Park | 1 | Chautauqua County | 14712 | |
| Orient Point | 1 | Suffolk County | 11957 | |
| Oriskany | 1 | Oneida County | 13424 | |
| Oriskany Falls | 1 | Oneida County | 13425 | |
| Orlando | 1 | Cattaraugus County | 14755 | |
| Orleans | 1 | Jefferson County | | |
| Orleans | 1 | Ontario County | 14432 | |
| Orleans Corners | 1 | Jefferson County | | |
| Orleans Four Corners | 1 | Jefferson County | 13656 | |
| Orrs Mill | 1 | Orange County | | |
| Orwell | 1 | Oswego County | 13426 | |
| Orwell | 1 | Oswego County | | |
| Oscawana | 1 | Westchester County | 10520 | |
| Oscawana Corners | 1 | Putnam County | | |
| Oscawana Lake | 1 | Putnam County | 10579 | |
| Osceola | 1 | Lewis County | 13316 | |
| Osceola | 1 | Lewis County | | |
| Ossian | 1 | Livingston County | | |
| Ossian | 1 | Livingston County | | |
| Ossian Center | 1 | Livingston County | 14437 | |
| Ossining | 1 | Westchester County | 10562 | |
| Ossining | 1 | Westchester County | | |
| Oswegatchie | 1 | St. Lawrence County | 13670 | |
| Oswegatchie | 1 | St. Lawrence County | | |
| Oswego | 1 | Oswego County | 13126 | |
| Oswego | 1 | Oswego County | | |
| Oswego Beach | 1 | Oswego County | | |
| Oswego Bitter | 1 | Onondaga County | 13031 | |
| Oswego Center | 1 | Oswego County | 13126 | |
| Otego | 1 | Otsego County | 13825 | |
| Otego | 1 | Otsego County | | |
| Otis | 1 | Monroe County | | |
| Otisco | 1 | Onondaga County | 13159 | |
| Otisco | 1 | Onondaga County | | |
| Otisco Valley | 1 | Onondaga County | 13110 | |
| Otisville | 1 | Orange County | 10963 | |
| Otsdawa | 1 | Otsego County | 13825 | |
| Otsego | 1 | Otsego County | | |
| Otselic | 1 | Chenango County | 13129 | |
| Otselic | 1 | Chenango County | | |
| Otselic Center | 1 | Chenango County | 12129 | |
| Otter Creek | 1 | Lewis County | 13343 | |
| Otter Hook | 1 | Greene County | | |
| Otter Kill | 1 | Orange County | | |
| Otter Lake | 1 | Oneida County | 13338 | |
| Ott Meadows | 1 | Onondaga County | 13088 | |
| Otto | 1 | Cattaraugus County | 14766 | |
| Otto | 1 | Cattaraugus County | | |
| Otto Mills | 1 | Oswego County | | |
| Ouaquaga | 1 | Broome County | 13826 | |
| Overlook | 1 | Saratoga County | 12822 | |
| Ovid | 1 | Seneca County | 14521 | |
| Ovid | 1 | Seneca County | | |
| Ovid Center | 1 | Seneca County | 14847 | |
| Ovington | 1 | Kings County | 11220 | |
| Owasco | 1 | Cayuga County | 13130 | |
| Owasco | 1 | Cayuga County | | |
| Owasco Hill | 1 | Cayuga County | | |
| Owasco Lake Station | 1 | Cayuga County | | |
| Owego | 1 | Tioga County | 13827 | |
| Owego | 1 | Tioga County | | |
| Owens Corners | 1 | St. Lawrence County | | |
| Owens Mills | 1 | Chemung County | 14825 | |
| Owls Head | 1 | Franklin County | 12969 | |
| Owls Nest | 1 | Wayne County | | |
| Owlsville | 1 | Schoharie County | | |
| Oxbow | 1 | Jefferson County | 13671 | |
| Oxford | 1 | Chenango County | 13830 | |
| Oxford | 1 | Chenango County | | |
| Oxford | 1 | Orange County | 10918 | |
| Oxford Depot | 1 | Orange County | | |
| Oyster Bay | 1 | Nassau County | 11771 | |
| Oyster Bay | 1 | Nassau County | | |
| Oyster Bay Cove | 1 | Nassau County | 11771 | |
| Ozone Park | 1 | Queens County | 11416 | |
