= Tabor-Wing House =

Historic house in New York, United States

- U.S. National Register of Historic Places
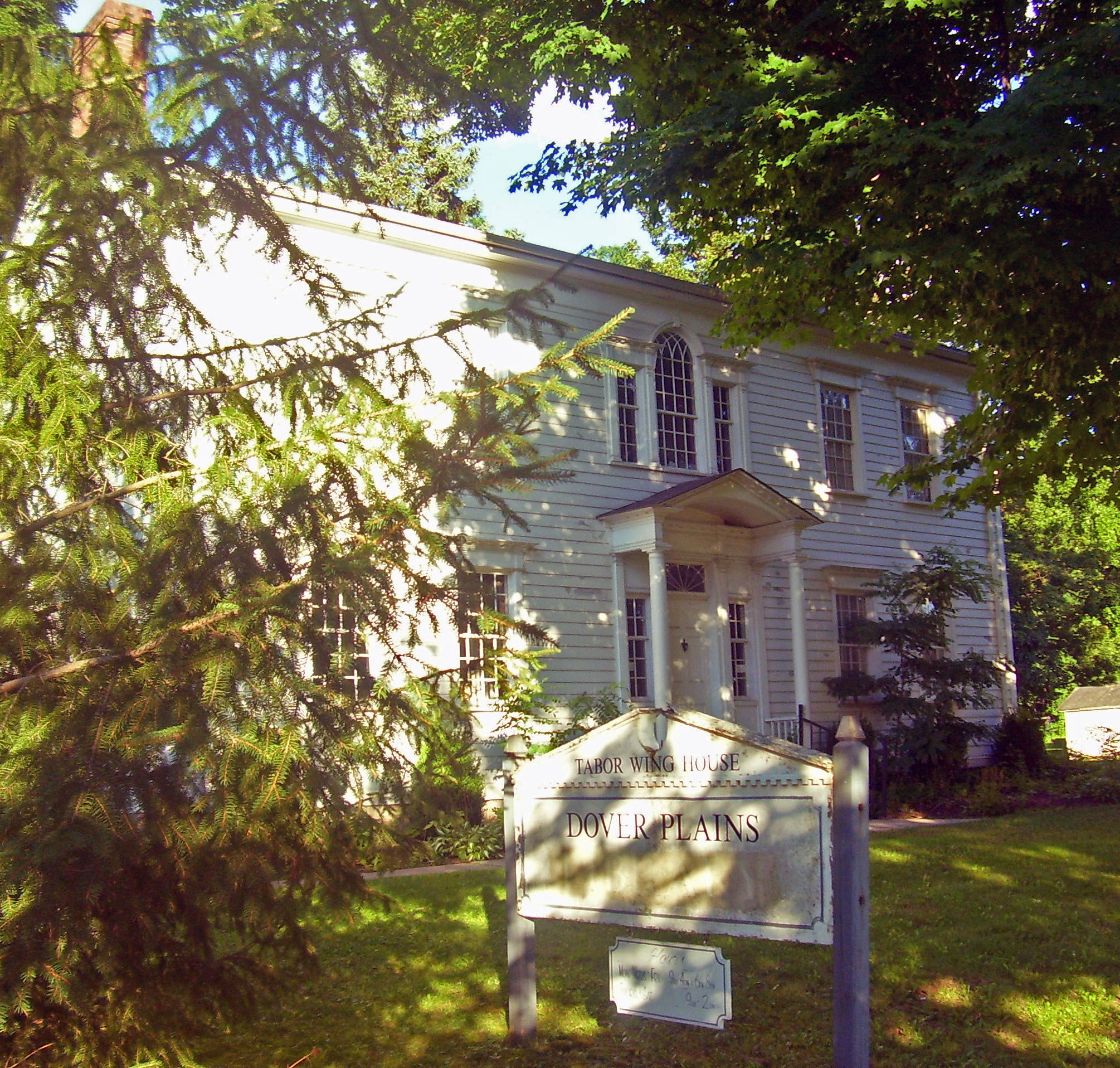
- West elevation, 2008

- Location within New York Location within the United States
- Interactive map showing the location of Tabor-Wing House
- Location: Dover Plains, NY
- Nearest city: Poughkeepsie, New York
- Coordinates: 41°44′18″N 73°34′45″W
- Area: 0.5 acres (2,000 m^{2})
- Built: ca. 1810
- Architectural style: Federal
- NRHP reference No.: 82003355
- Added to NRHP: 1982

The Tabor-Wing House is located on NY 22 in Dover Plains, New York, United States. It is a frame house built in 1810 by a prominent family in the area, relatively intact today.

It has an unusual amount of decoration for a Federal-style building. Because of that, and its importance in local history, the Tabor-Wing House was listed on the National Register of Historic Places in 1982 by founding member and current Town Historian, Caroline Reichenberg. Between 1979 and 2003 it was also the home of the Dover Plains Library.

After the library moved out, the Dover Historical Society donated the building to the Town of Dover, which began a restoration that finished in 2006. Today it is used for some municipal government offices and as a local history museum.

== Building ==
The house sits on a half-acre 2,000 m^{2} triangular lot at the junction of NY 22 and North Nellie Hill Road, which becomes Cemetery Road south of the house. It has a two-story, five-bay main block with a smaller wing, both supported by a full stone basement. The main block is sided in clapboard, while the wing uses flush boards. The gabled asphalt-shingled roofs have chimneys at all three ends and a very gentle pitch.

The western (front) facade is heavily ornamented. A small porch with pedimented roof shelters a centrally located main entrance topped by a leaded glass transom and flanked by sidelights and fluted pilasters rising to a dentilled entablature with modillioned cornice. Above the entrance is a tripartite Palladian window. The other windows' trim echoes the main entrance, as do the paired rounded-arch windows in the attic on the north and south profiles. The smaller kitchen wing has no decoration. Its roof covers a porch on the south.

Inside, the entrance hallway divides two large parlors with much original finishing, including carved moldings and mantels, original wall and ceiling plaster and flooring. The original fireplace and bake oven are still in the kitchen wing.

== Aesthetics ==
The house's ornamentation is unusual for Federal style homes in general, not just in the Hudson Valley. That quality is balanced by the overall form, very much in keeping with regional building traditions. These reflect the aspirations and tastes of its builders at that time in history.

Wakefield Worcester, who visited the house for the Historic American Buildings Survey in 1937, wondered if the builder might have been a cabinetmaker due to the high level of exterior detail. He found it a stark contrast to the relatively bare interior.

== History ==
Thomas Tabor, the builder of the house, had come to the future Town of Dover as a young boy with his father from Rhode Island in 1748, when it was largely uninhabited by European settlers. His father willed him his landholdings, including all of present-day Dover Plains, upon his death in 1782. After building the house around 1810, shortly after the town was established, he in turn willed it to his daughter Sally. She was married to Mahlon Wing, another of the area's prominent landowners for whom the hamlet of Wingdale is named.

Wing descendants would occupy the house for over 75 years, from 1839 until 1926 until Theodore Wing's widow Mary died in 1926. In 1928 the house was sold to Frank and Mae Connell. Shortly afterwards, modern oil heating was installed. It was acquired in May, 1977 by the Dover Historical Society, which made many improvements to its infrastructure before it was put into service as a library.

In 2003 the library moved out to larger quarters and the Historical Society donated it to the town. It began making improvements to the interior, restoring it to its original appearance and appropriate period furnishings. After it completed those restorations in 2006, it moved some of its offices in.
