= Drag strip =

Drag strip (or Dragstrip) may refer to:

- Dragstrip, track used for drag racing
- Drag Strip (Transformers), Transformer character who is one of the Stunticons
- Videocart-9: Drag Strip, drag racing video game released for the Fairchild Channel F in 1976

== See also ==
- Dover Drag Strip
- Lions Drag Strip
- Hilo Dragstrip
