= Drag =

Drag or The Drag may refer to:

== Places ==
- Drag, Norway, a village in Tysfjord municipality, Nordland, Norway
- Drág, the Hungarian name for Dragu Commune in Sălaj County, Romania
- Drag (Austin, Texas), the portion of Guadalupe Street adjacent to the University of Texas at Austin

== Science and technology ==
- Drag (physics), the force which resists motion of an object through a fluid
  - Aerodynamic drag, the aerodynamic force which resists motion of an aircraft or other object through the air
  - Drag parachute, a parachute to reduce the speed of vehicles
  - Drag coefficient
- Drag and drop, a computer input gesture
- Drag harrow, in agriculture, a heavy type of harrow used to break up soil
- Drag system, a mechanical means of applying variable pressure to a fishing rod reel in order to act as a friction brake
- Police drag, a small dredge used to recover objects or bodies lost in shallow water
- Drag, older name for grapnel anchor
- Drag, older name for horse-drawn carriage

== Arts and entertainment ==
=== Performance ===
- Drag (entertainment), a form of exaggerated femininity or masculinity
- Drag: Combing Through the Big Wigs of Show Business, a history book of drag queens by Frank DeCaro

=== Film and theatre ===
- The Drag (play), a Mae West play
- Drag (1929 film), a drama film directed by Frank Lloyd
- Drag (2026 film), an upcoming American comedy horror thriller film
- The Drag (film), a 1966 Canadian animated short

=== Music ===
- To drag, in music, to play slower than the indicated tempo
- Drag (percussion), in drumming, one of the 26 rudiments, or basic patterns used in rudimental drumming

==== Artists ====
- Drag (band), an Australian band

==== Genres ====
- Witch house (genre), a subgenre of dark electronic music also known as drag
- Slow drag (dance), a genre of blues dancing

==== Recordings ====
- Drag (k.d. lang album), a 1997 album by k.d. lang
- Drag (Red Aunts album), an album by the Red Aunts
- "Drag", a song by King Adora released on the single "Drag/9" Of Pure Malice"
- "The Drag", a song by Ty Segall from the album Ty Segall
- "Drag", a song by Hole released on the single "Malibu"
- "Drag", a song by Lagwagon from the album Hang
- "Drag", a song by Ronnie Linares and The Del-Aires
- "Drag", a song by Steve Wynn
- "Drag", a single by Day Wave
- "Drag", a song by Grey Daze

== Sport ==
- Drag (route), in American football
- Drag racing, a form of automobile racing
- Drag suit, a type of training swimwear.
- Drag hunting, a form of hunting with hounds

== Other uses ==
- Drag (carriage), a type of horse-drawn coach
- A deep inhalation of a cigarette, in slang
- Dragging death, a death caused by someone being dragged behind or underneath a moving vehicle or animal.

== See also ==
- Drag strip (disambiguation)
