= Oniontown, New York =

Community in Dutchess County, New York, US

Coordinates: 41.722515°N 73.581233°W

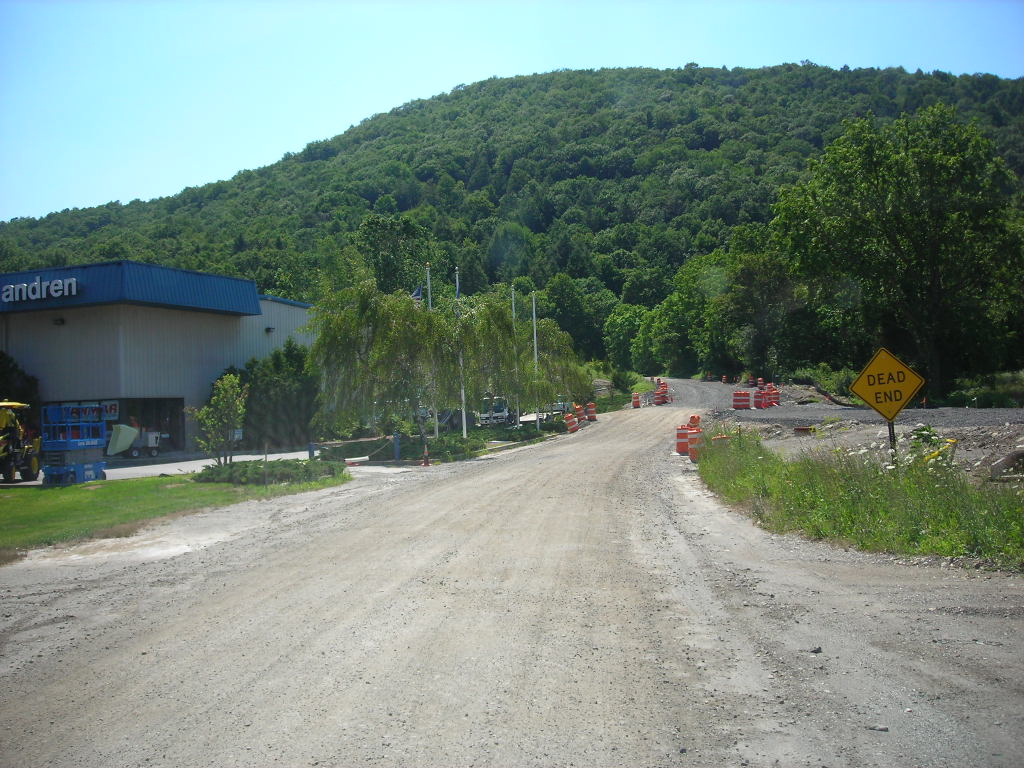
Oniontown Road

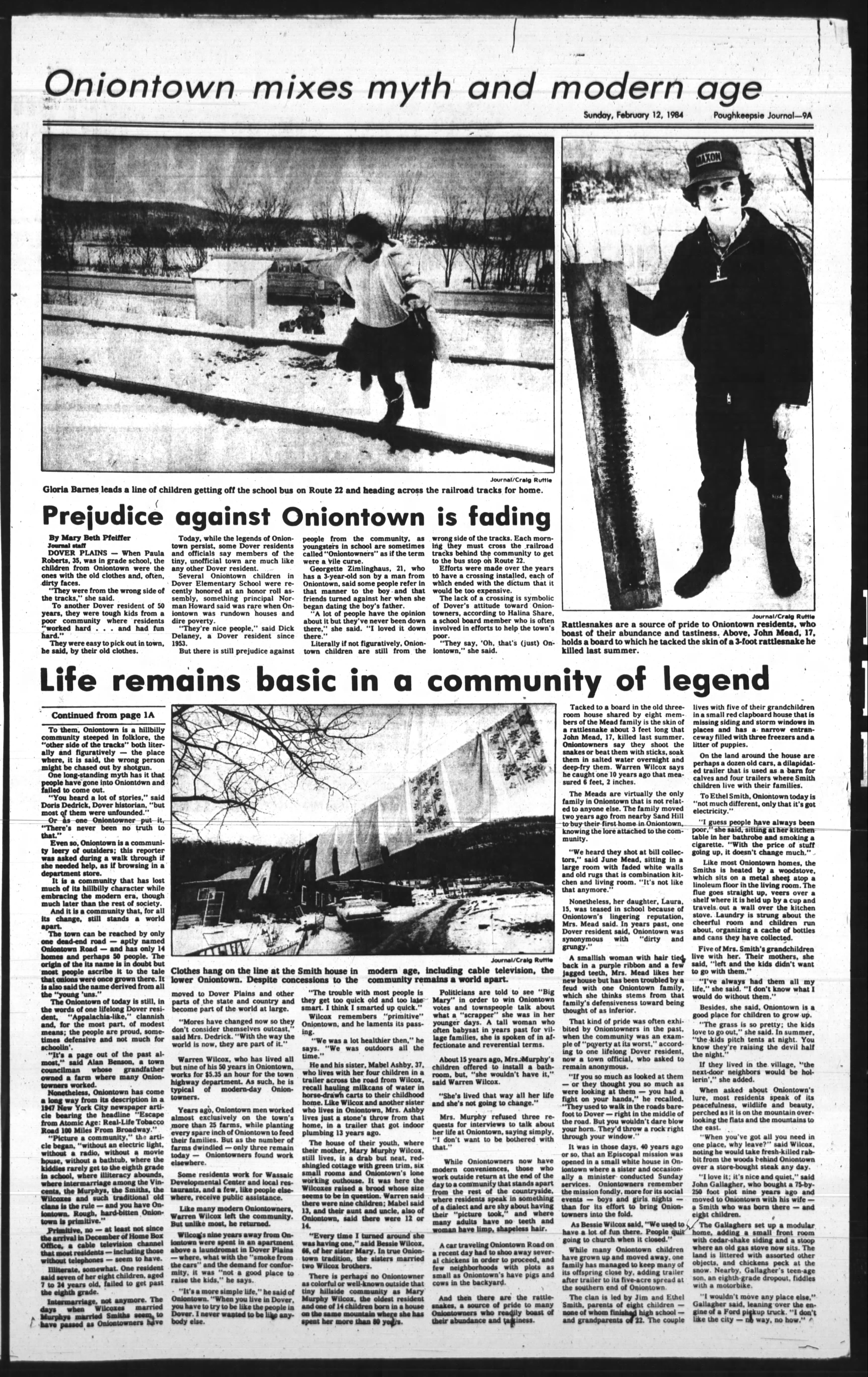
Oniontown mixes myth and modern age

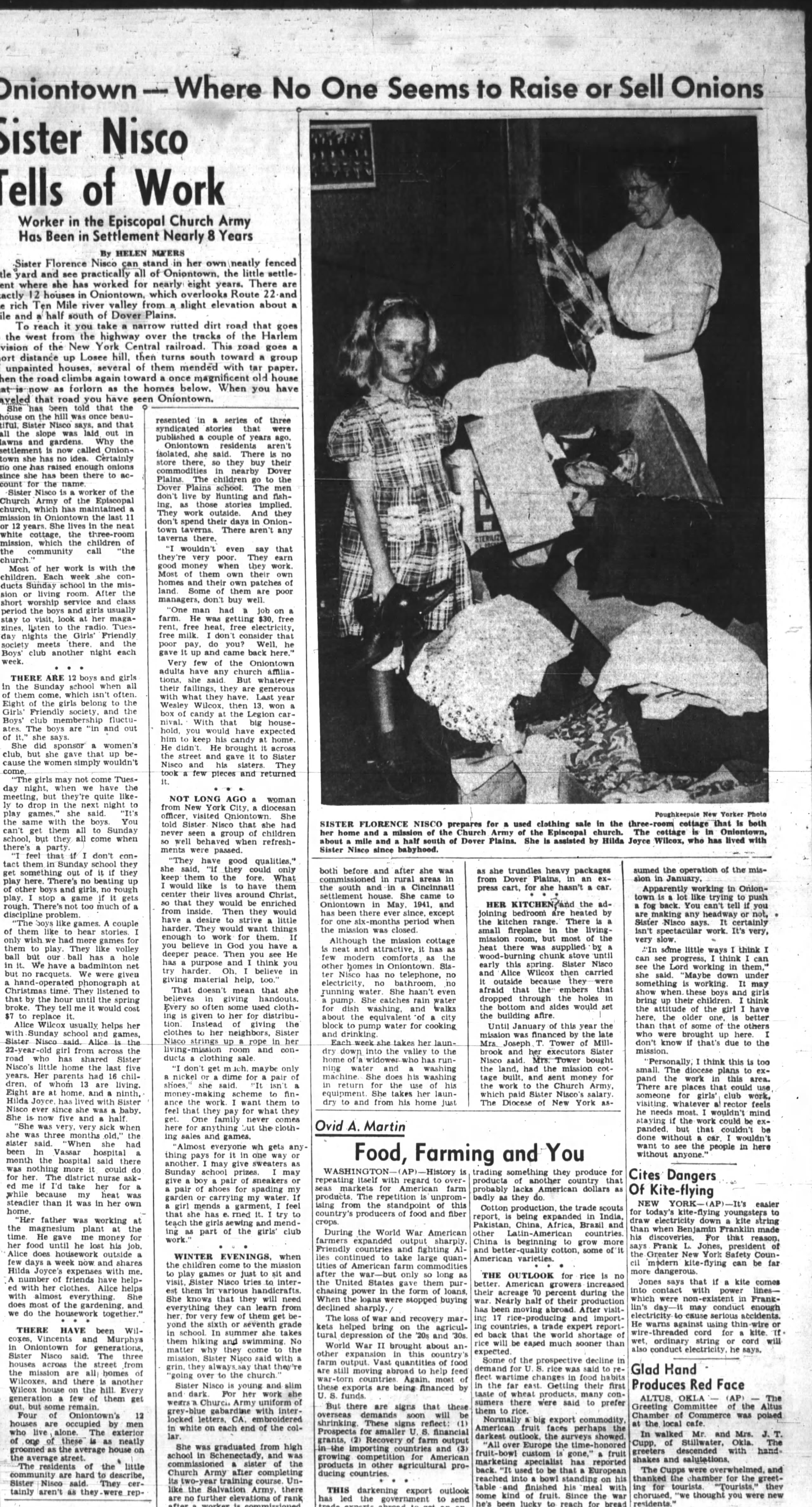
Oniontown – Where No One Seems to Raise or Sell Onions

Oniontown is a road and community in Dutchess County, New York, United States, located 1.5 miles south of the hamlet of Dover Plains, in the town of Dover, partially known for the historically off-putting demeanor of its residents towards outsiders.

In 1947, International News Service reporter James L. Kilgallen voyaged into Oniontown and wrote three articles about the place including; "Escape from Atomic Age: Real Life Tobacco Road 100 Miles from Broadway".

It was briefly the subject of worldwide media attention in 2008, when a derisive video about the area published on YouTube led to visiting outsiders being attacked.
