= Second Baptist Church of Dover =

Historic church in New York, United States

- U.S. National Register of Historic Places
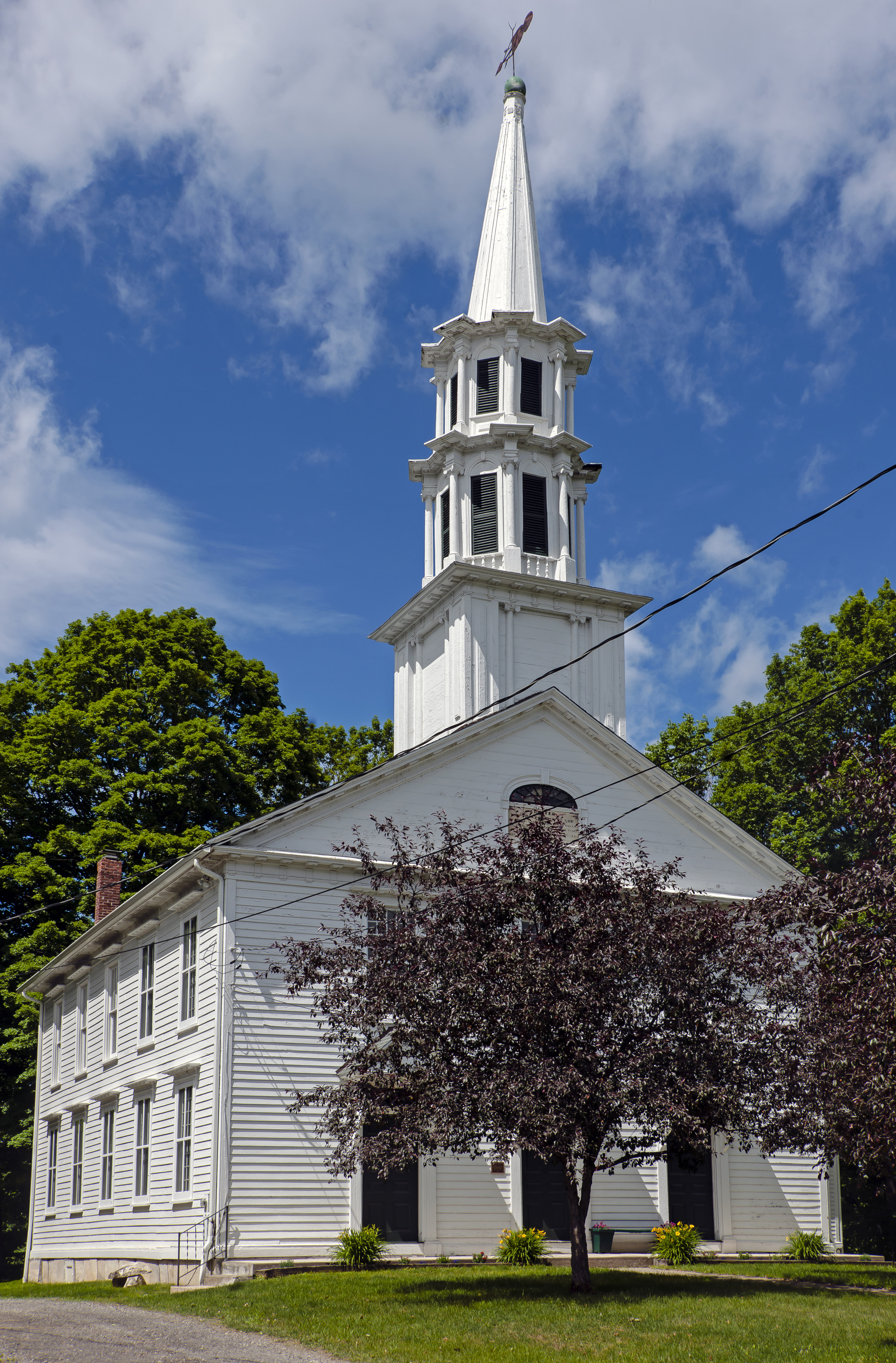
- West profile and south elevation, 2016

- Location within New York Location within the United States
- Location: 29 Mill St., Dover Plains, New York
- Coordinates: 41°44′27″N 73°34′43″W
- Area: 0.9 acres (0.36 ha)
- NRHP reference No.: 10000589
- Added to NRHP: August 30, 2010

Second Baptist Church of Dover is a historic Baptist church in Dover Plains in Dutchess County, New York. It was originally conceived and erected in the 1830s. It is a heavy timber-frame structure on a foundation formed of dressed ashlar marble. Renovations occurred in 1868 and 1887. It has a gable roof and features a three-stage bell tower with steeple and crowning weather vane.

It was added to the National Register of Historic Places in 2010.

== See also ==
- National Register of Historic Places listings in Dutchess County, New York
