= Wingdale, New York =

- Census-designated place
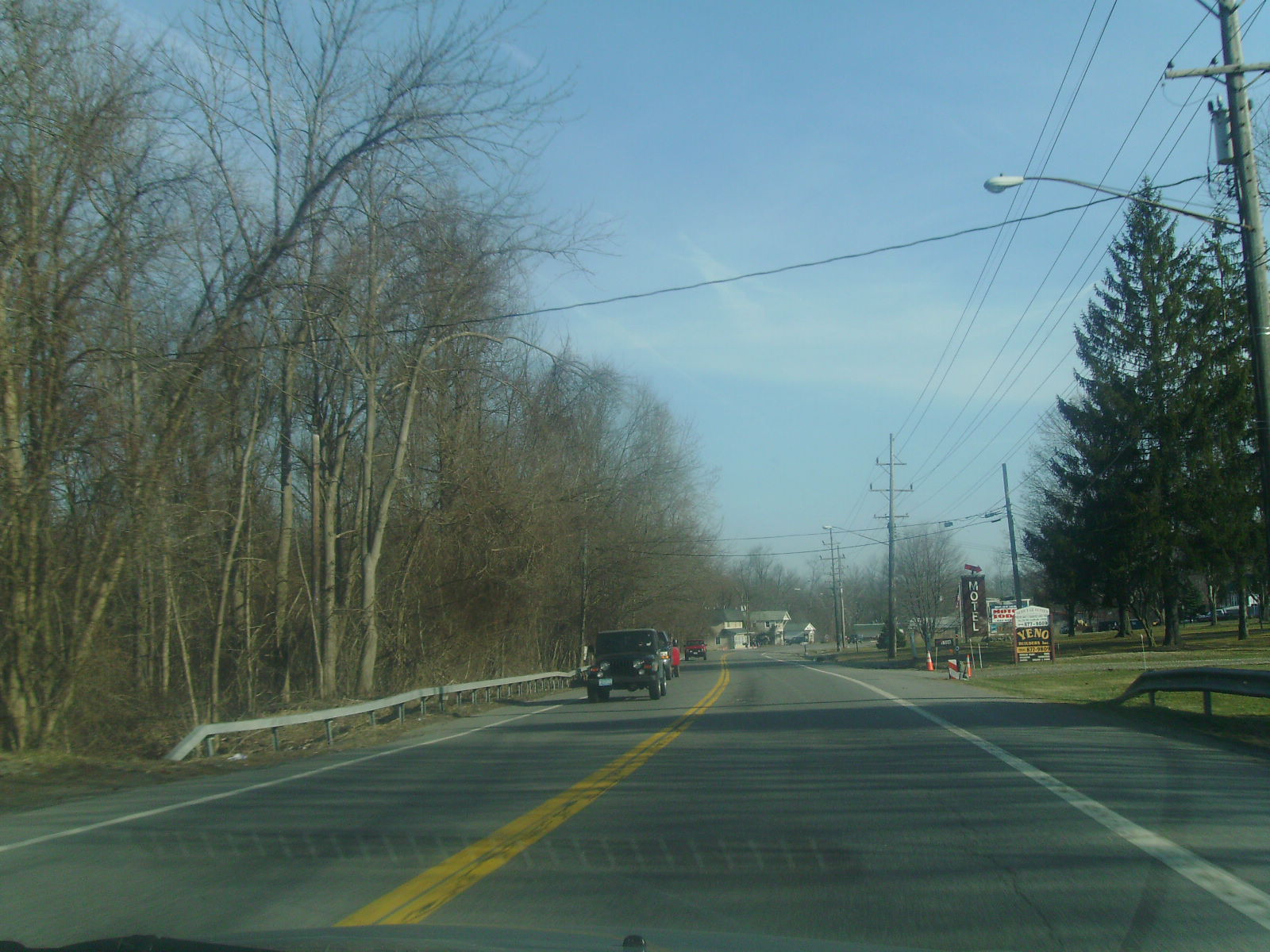
- Northbound NY 22 and eastbound NY 55 as they pass through Wingdale

- Location within New York Location within the United States
- Coordinates: 41°38′48″N 73°34′4″W
- Country: United States
- State: New York
- County: Dutchess
- Town: Dover

Area
  - Total: 2.60 sq mi (6.73 km^{2})
  - Land: 2.57 sq mi (6.65 km^{2})
  - Water: 0.031 sq mi (0.08 km^{2})
- Elevation: 425 ft (130 m)

Population (2020)
  - Total: 1,051
  - Density: 409.5/sq mi (158.11/km^{2})
- Time zone: UTC-5 (Eastern (EST))
  - Summer (DST): UTC-4 (EDT)
- ZIP Code: 12594
- Area code: 845
- FIPS code: 36-82579
- GNIS feature ID: 2806935

Wingdale is a hamlet and census-designated place (CDP) in the town of Dover in Dutchess County, New York, United States. It was first listed as a CDP prior to the 2020 census. As of the 2020 census, Wingdale had a population of 1,051.

The community is in southeastern Dutchess County, in the southern part of Dover. The hamlet of Wingdale is in the northern part of the CDP, while the Evangelical Center is in the south, on the grounds of the former Harlem Valley State Hospital, and scattered housing occupies the hills in the eastern part of the CDP. The Swamp River, a north-flowing tributary of the Tenmile River, part of the Housatonic River watershed, runs through the center of the CDP.

New York State Route 22 runs through the CDP, passing east of Wingdale hamlet. The highway leads north 7 miles (11 km) to Dover Plains and south the same distance to Pawling. State Route 55 runs concurrently with NY 22 to the south, but turns east at Wingdale and leads 6 miles (10 km) to Gaylordsville, Connecticut. Wingdale is 21 miles (34 km) east of Poughkeepsie and 23 miles (37 km) northwest of Danbury, Connecticut.

The Metro-North Harlem Valley–Wingdale station is located between the Evangelical Center and the Harlem Valley Golf Course in the southern part of the CDP.

== Demographics ==
Historical population
Census	Pop.	Note	%±
2020	1,051		—
U.S. Decennial Census

== Attractions ==
Wingdale is the former home of the Dover Drag Strip, a dragstrip that existed from 1961 to 1976.
