= Caroline Congdon =

American poet

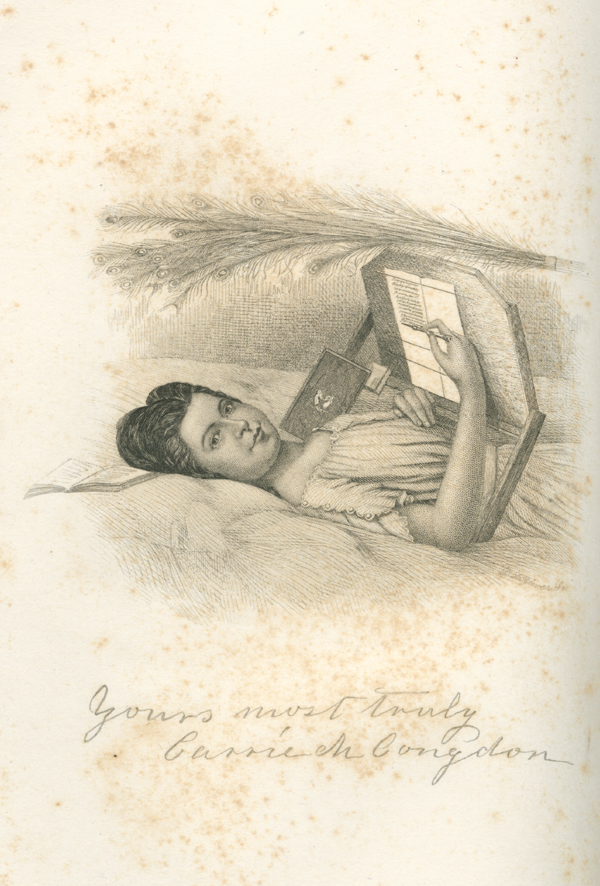
Portrait of Caroline Congdon from the frontispiece of The Guardian Angel

Caroline M. Congdon (1841/2 - March 1, 1860) was an American poet. She sometimes styled herself "Connie" in her writing.

Congdon was a native of Onondaga County, New York, and lived for most of her life in the town of Amber. One of five siblings, early in her childhood her father died, and the family was left with little money. Caroline was educated at home and in the local district school, and early displayed a taste for intellectual pursuits, but she suffered from chronic poor health, including a fever and paralysis which left her bedridden at the age of fourteen. Left only with the use of her hand, she began to write poetry, using a pencil and a specially-made upside-down table which held the paper in place over her head and chest. In this manner she produced enough poems to fill a volume, The Guardian Angel, which was published in 1856 and which featured as a frontispiece a portrait of Congdon in her bed. The poems range from shorter works on a variety of topics to long, narrative pieces on romantic subjects; the book also contains a poem on an abolitionist subject. In the preface she asked "the Critic to spare my little book, and the tender-hearted Reader to drop a tear of sympathy for its afflicted Authoress"; she died four years after the book's publication. She is buried in the village cemetery in Amber.
