= Harlem Valley State Hospital =

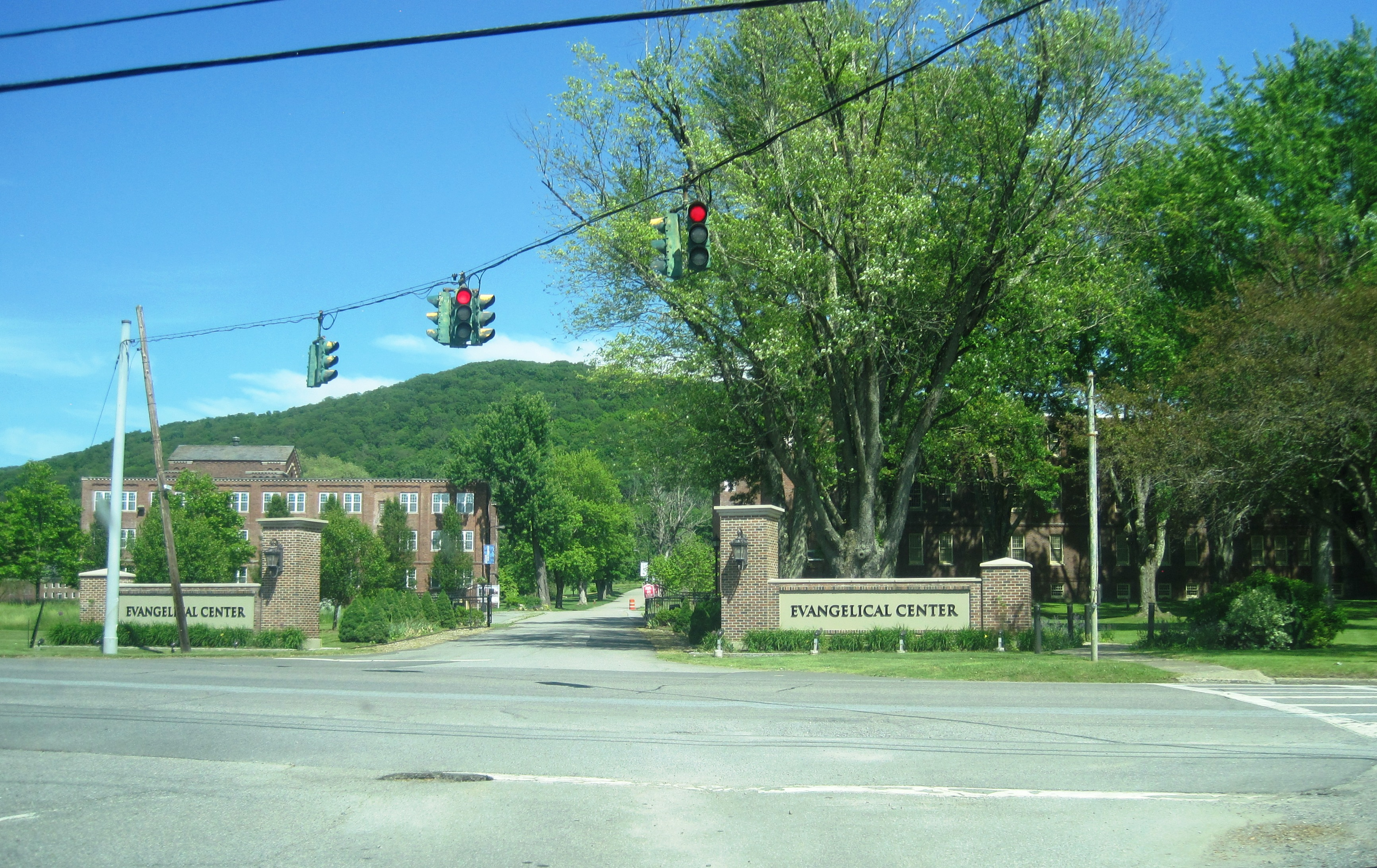
- Main entrance to the former hospital, now Evangelical Center of Olivet University in June 2024

Geography
- Location: Dover, New York, United States
- Coordinates: 41.63734°N 73.57229°W

History
- Opened: 1924
- Closed: 1994

Links
- Lists: Hospitals in New York State

Harlem Valley State Hospital, south of the hamlet of Wingdale in the town of Dover, was a New York State psychiatric hospital that operated from 1924 to 1994.

== History ==
The grounds were originally slated to be a correctional facility, Wingdale Prison, but complaints by the local population caused a re-purposing of the buildings (under construction) into a state hospital. It is located on NY 22/55 opposite the Harlem Valley–Wingdale station on the Metro-North Harlem Line.

The hospital was closed in 1994 due to budget cuts and was sold to a Long Island-based housing developer, the Benjamin Companies. However, the Benjamin Companies gave up on its plans to pursue the Dover Knolls project - comprising development of a golf-course housing community surrounded by commercial, office, and retail development - when the Great Recession hit and just before the housing market collapsed.

== Current ownership ==
In August 2013, Olivet Management LLC, a newly formed real estate development and management company, bought from the Long Island developer the Benjamin Companies 503 acres on the east side(approximately half the property) for $20 million, to be used as an upstate campus for Olivet University.

Opinions on Olivet's purchase of the property were mixed: on one hand, Business Insider reported in 2014, "Wingdale residents are actually excited about the arrival of Olivet," expectant that "the college will draw new jobs and commerce to the town." On the other, David Allee, a photographer and former urban planner who captured pictures of the "massive campus with dozens of decayed buildings" before Olivet University refurbished the property, thought Olivet's plan to use the existing structures was a bad idea. He observed: "It's become a hazardous waste site. The buildings were so full of asbestos and mold that I'm shocked anybody thinks they could rehab them." In fact, in response to a complaint levied on October 23, 2013, OSHA fined Olivet Management $2.3 million for knowingly exposing workers to asbestos and lead during the renovation of the property and ultimately placed Olivet in OSHA's Severe Violator Enforcement Program. Additionally, multiple news outlets have cited several controversies about the school and its founder, David Jang.

On October 27, 2015, Olivet University obtained from the New York State Education Department the right to open and operate an academic institution in Dover and in 2016 began offering courses at the new campus, dubbed "Olivet Center". The Metro-North station adjacent to the campus, formerly called "Harlem Valley-State Hospital", has been renamed "Harlem Valley-Wingdale".

In 2022 Olivet was forced to close the University when the State of New York decided to not renew the license due to issues regarding its finances (tax liens, civil lawsuits for defaulting on contracted payment terms, failure to pay workers compensation insurance, and the criminal case in which Olivet pled guilty to falsification of business records and conspiracy). Olivet renamed the campus "Evangelical Center".
