= Hilo Dragstrip =

Dragstrip in Hilo, Hawaii

Coordinates: 19°40′53″N 155°1′49″W

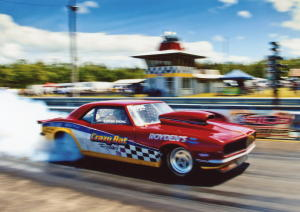
The car named "Crazy Rat"

Hilo Dragstrip is a dragstrip located just southeast of Hilo, Hawaii at . It is also called the Pana‘ewa Drag Strip. Hilo dragstrip opened in 1978, and is now operated by the County of Hawaiʻi. The Big Island Auto Club and the Hawaii Drag Racing League race at the strip. The biggest race events at the Hilo Drag Strip are the BIAC Memorial Day Drags and the BIAC Tommy Thompson Labor Day Drags. The track is sanctioned by the International Hot Rod Association (IHRA) (HDRL) (since 2003) and American Hot Rod Association (AHRA) (BIAC) (since 2015) International Hot Rod Motocross and kart racing tracks.
