= Otisco, New York =

- Town
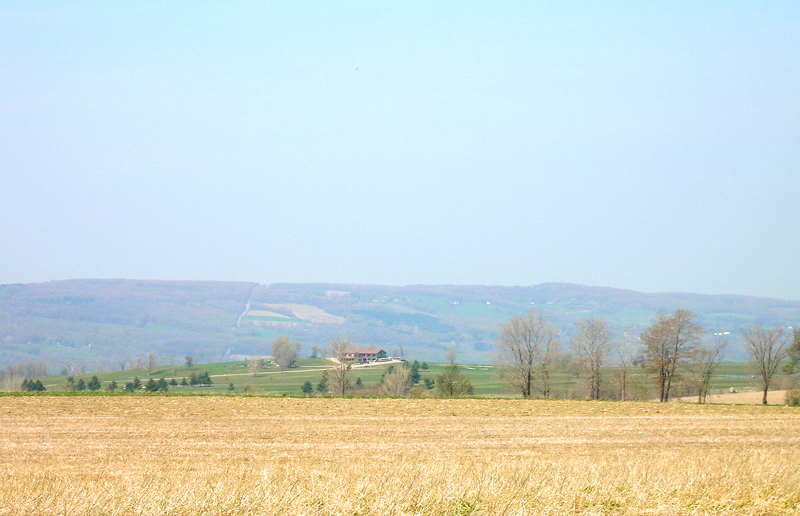
- Otisco countryside

- Location in Onondaga County and the state of New York.
- Coordinates: 42°52′N 76°14′W
- Country: United States
- State: New York
- County: Onondaga

Government
  - Type: Town Council
  - Town Supervisor: Glenn R. Hall (R)
  - Town Council: Members' List: • Teal Trendowski (R); • Steven Loetterle (R); • H. Stanley Edinger (R); • George O. Cook (R)

Area
  - Total: 31.16 sq mi (80.71 km^{2})
  - Land: 29.53 sq mi (76.49 km^{2})
  - Water: 1.63 sq mi (4.22 km^{2})
- Elevation: 1,460 ft (445 m)

Population (2020)
  - Total: 2,368
  - Density: 80.18/sq mi (30.96/km^{2})
- Time zone: UTC-5 (Eastern (EST))
  - Summer (DST): UTC-4 (EDT)
- ZIP code: 13159
- Area code: 315
- FIPS code: 36-55651
- GNIS feature ID: 0979328
- Website: Town website

Otisco is a town in Onondaga County, New York, United States. As of the 2020 Census, the population was 2,368. Otisco is in the southwestern part of the county, situated at the northern edge of the Appalachian Highlands, where an escarpment declines to the Lake Ontario plain and the city of Syracuse five miles to the north.

== History ==
The town was part of the former Central New York Military Tract. The town was first settled by outsiders around 1798, but permanent settlement began around 1801. The Town of Otisco was formed in 1806 from parts of other towns: Pompey, Marcellus, and Tully.

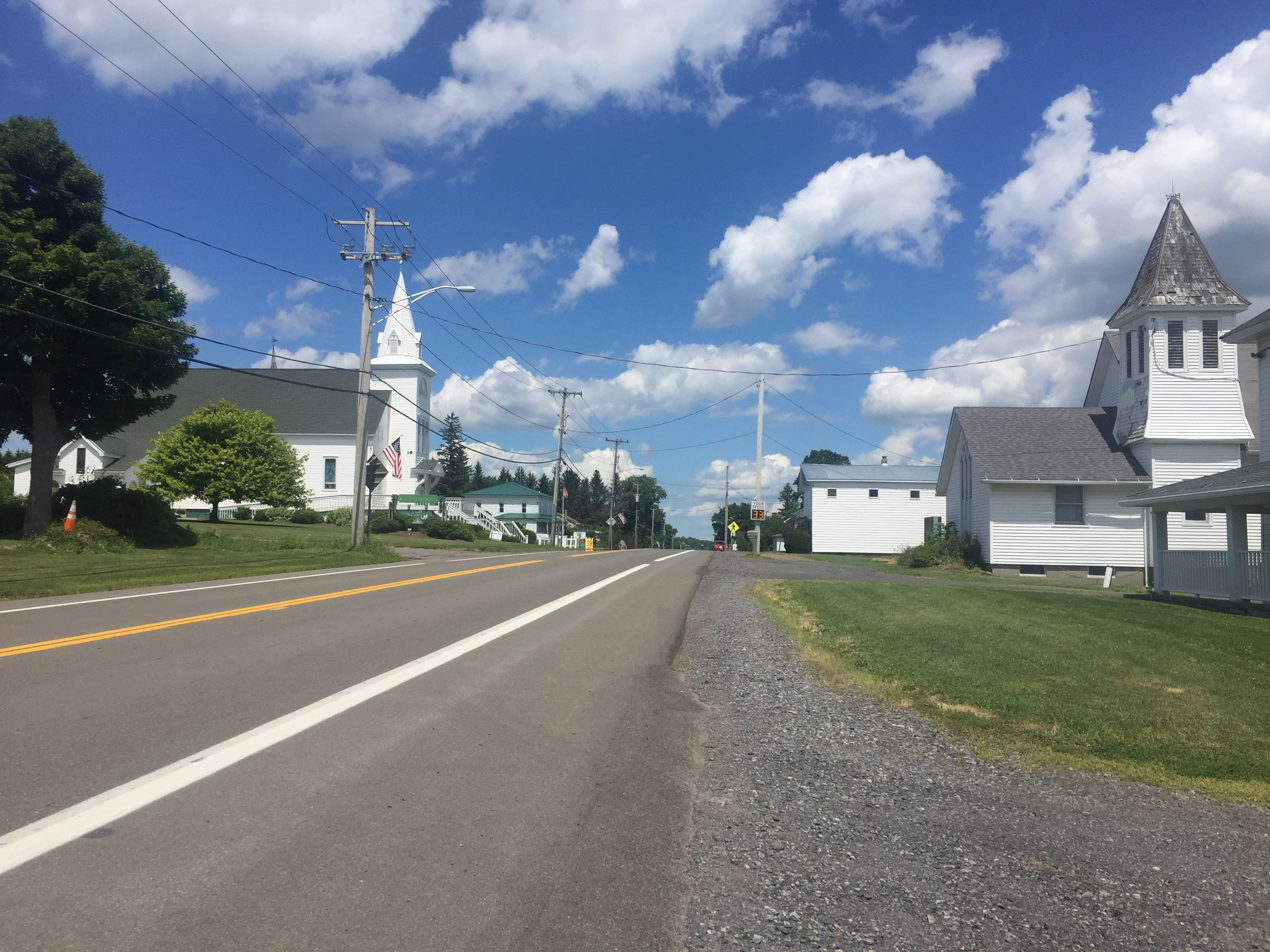
Two of the three or more historic churches in hamlet of Otisco

The name "Otisco" may have been derived from the Iroquois name for Nine Mile Creek, Us-te-ke, meaning "bitter-nut-hickory". At least one older map, published in 1825, has the name spelled as "Ostisco". The name may also have been derived from the word ostickney, meaning "waters much dried away", or from the Onondaga word ostick, meaning "the water is low".

== Geography ==
According to the United States Census Bureau, the town has a total area of 31.2 square miles (81 km^{2}), of which 29.6 square miles (77 km^{2}) is land and 1.5 square miles (3.9 km^{2}) (4.94%) is water.

Otisco is in the Finger Lakes District of New York and borders Otisco Lake.

New York State Route 80 is a north-south highway in the town. A short part of US Route 20 crosses the northeastern corner of the town.

== Demographics ==
Historical population
Census	Pop.	Note	%±
1820	1,726		—
1830	1,938		12.3%
1840	1,906		−1.7%
1850	1,804		−5.4%
1860	1,848		2.4%
1870	1,602		−13.3%
1880	1,558		−2.7%
1890	1,326		−14.9%
1900	1,202		−9.4%
1910	1,066		−11.3%
1920	914		−14.3%
1930	871		−4.7%
1940	873		0.2%
1950	975		11.7%
1960	1,188		21.8%
1970	1,470		23.7%
1980	2,112		43.7%
1990	2,255		6.8%
2000	2,561		13.6%
2010	2,541		−0.8%
2020	2,368		−6.8%
U.S. Decennial Census

As of the census of 2000, there were 2,561 people, 922 households, and 693 families residing in the town. The population density was 86.4 inhabitants per square mile (33.4/km^{2}). There were 1,200 housing units at an average density of 40.5 per square mile (15.6/km^{2}). The racial makeup of the town was 97.27% White, 0.23% African American, 0.31% Native American, 0.62% Asian, 0.16% from other races, and 1.41% from two or more races. Hispanic or Latino of any race were 0.47% of the population.

There were 922 households, out of which 42.2% had children under the age of 18 living with them, 61.4% were married couples living together, 8.2% had a female householder with no husband present, and 24.8% were non-families. 18.9% of all households were made up of individuals, and 6.3% had someone living alone who was 65 years of age or older. The average household size was 2.78 and the average family size was 3.22.

In the town, the population was spread out, with 31.2% under the age of 18, 6.4% from 18 to 24, 31.0% from 25 to 44, 21.8% from 45 to 64, and 9.6% who were 65 years of age or older. The median age was 36 years. For every 100 females, there were 103.6 males. For every 100 females age 18 and over, there were 102.8 males.

The median income for a household in the town was $44,643, and the median income for a family was $49,318. Males had a median income of $39,656 versus $26,463 for females. The per capita income for the town was $19,726. About 3.2% of families and 5.7% of the population were below the poverty line, including 8.3% of those under age 18 and 1.6% of those age 65 or over.

== Notable people ==
- Caroline Congdon, poet, long resident in Amber
- R. Walter Riehlman, former US Congressman

== Communities and locations in Otisco ==
- Amber – A hamlet in the northwestern part of Otisco by Otisco Lake.
- Amber Brook – A stream flowing into Otisco Lake by Amber.
- Bay Shores – A lakeside hamlet north of Rice Grove.
- Bear Mountain (the blue hole) – An elevation in the northeast, once known for the number of bears; the blue hole is a water hole on the mountain that is known for its swift current and waterfalls.
- Case – A location in the northeastern part of Otisco, south of Maple Grove.
- Gamble Mill – A hamlet between Otisco hamlet and Rice Grove.
- Heath Grove – A location south of Amber.
- Maple Grove – A hamlet in the northeastern part of Otisco.
- Otisco – The hamlet of Otisco.
- Otisco Valley – A hamlet near the town line in the southwestern part of Otisco.
- Rice Grove – A hamlet in the southwestern part of the town, on Otisco Lake, west of Otisco hamlet.
- Williams Grove – A lakeshore hamlet south of Rice Grove.
