= Dover Drag Strip =

Former dragstrip in Wingdale, New York

Coordinates: 41.652°N 73.584°W

Dover Drag Strip, opened in May 1961 and closed in 1976, and was a dragstrip for quarter-mile drag racing in Wingdale, New York. The track was touted as "the smoothest, most state-of-the-art facility" of its kind at the time. The track featured epoxy-based asphalt, 60 feet wide. It had its own "timing tower" that had the timing equipment, and served as the operations center, with operators calling the Elapsed Time [ET] and MPH of each pair of racers via intercom to the "times slip booth" at the other end of the track. This is also where the track announcer entertained and informed the spectators of the action. All this was considered "new technology" in 1961. By 1964, the flag starter was replaced with a homebuilt "Christmas Tree", with multiple colored lights, counting down each start. This was one of the first of its type in the entire nation.

The track was founded and operated by Brookfield gas station owner Chet Anderson and his partner, Joe Archiere, of Germantown, Connecticut. It filled the regional gap left by the closing of the Car Club Racing at Montgomery, New York, airport. Dover preceded the other tracks to follow suit, famous in the area, namely Connecticut Dragway (now closed) and the still operational Lebanon Valley Track, near Albany. Racers from as far as Maine, Massachusetts and New Jersey would regularly frequent the strip.

Dover was host to exhibition runs by the Legendary Don ‘Big Daddy” Garlits, California's “T.V Tommy Ivo”, the original Batmobile and Jet Cars. Average car entries of over 400 were common with upwards of 4,000 spectators on special events. There has been continued interest in this now defunct track, thanks to the ongoing Dover Drag Strip Nostalgia reunion every year.
