= Dover, New York =

- Town
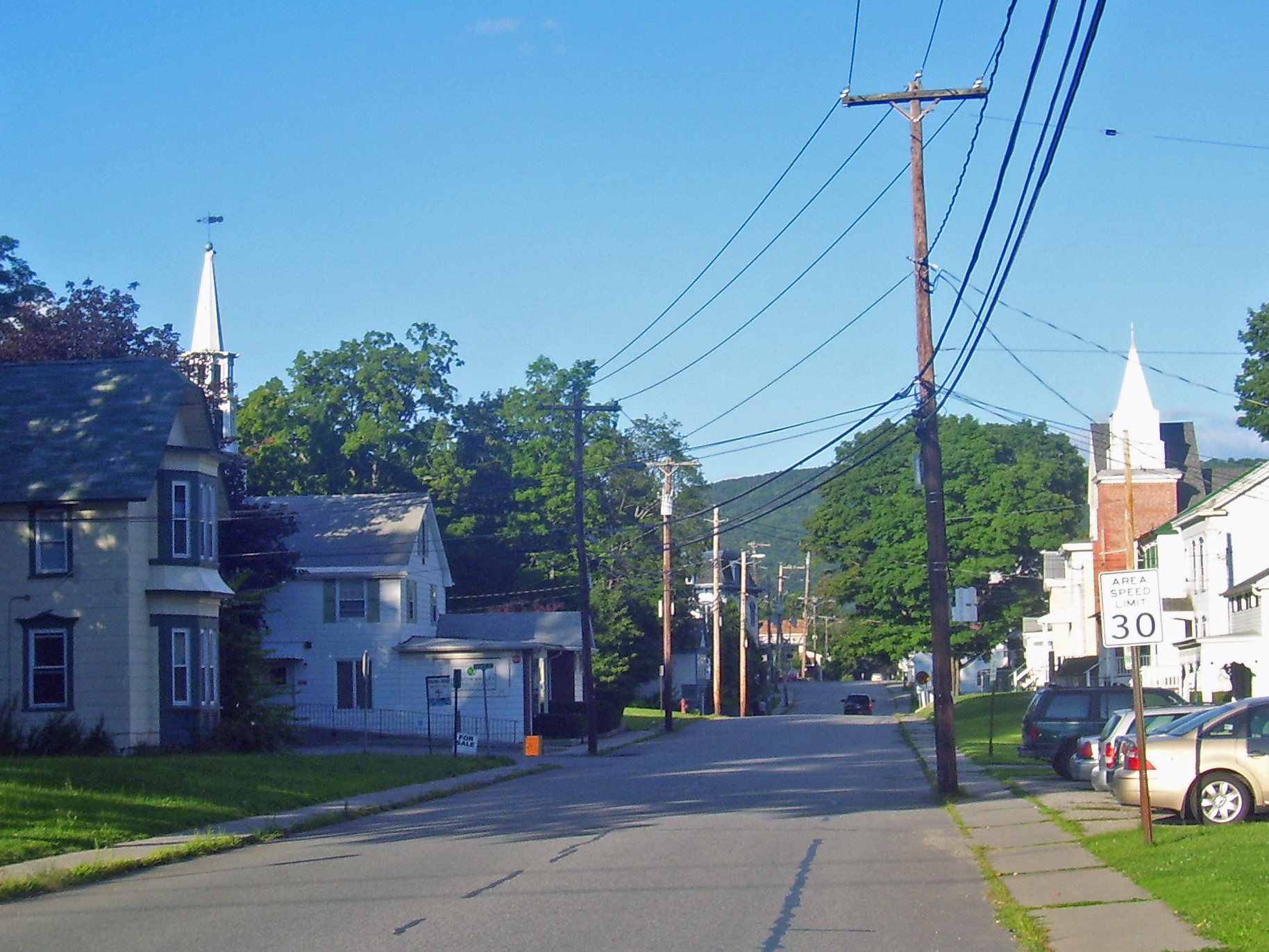
- Downtown Dover Plains

- Seal

- Location of Dover, New York
- Coordinates: 41°41′22″N 73°34′51″W
- Country: United States
- State: New York
- County: Dutchess

Government
  - Type: Town Council
  - Town Supervisor: Richard C. Yeno (R)
  - Town Council: Members' List: • Redmond Abrams (R); • Andrew House (R); • Jane Meunier (D); • Richard Yeno (R)

Area
  - Total: 56.33 sq mi (145.90 km^{2})
  - Land: 55.18 sq mi (142.92 km^{2})
  - Water: 1.15 sq mi (2.98 km^{2})
- Elevation: 568 ft (173 m)

Population (2020)
  - Total: 8,415
  - Density: 152.5/sq mi (58.88/km^{2})
- Time zone: UTC-5 (Eastern (EST))
  - Summer (DST): UTC-4 (EDT)
- ZIP Codes: 12522 (Dover Plains); 12594 (Wingdale); 12564 (Pawling); 12592 (Wassaic)
- FIPS code: 36-027-20819
- GNIS feature ID: 0978906
- Website: www.doverny.gov

Dover is a town in Dutchess County, New York, United States. The population was 8,415 at the 2020 census. The town was named after Dover in England, the home town of an early settler.

The town of Dover is located on the eastern boundary of the county, north of Pawling, south of Amenia, and west of the state of Connecticut.

== History ==
In 1637, the Pequot people had been driven from their former homes in Connecticut and settled in what is now Dover. They were led by Gideon Mauwee for part of their time in this location.

The town was formed in 1807 from part of the town of Pawling. The first town meeting took place in the home of John Preston, an early settler. That home, built circa 1730, is now an inn and restaurant known as Old Drovers Inn.

The Harlem Valley Psychiatric Center (1924–1994) was a major source of employment for Dover and the surrounding areas. When the center was closed in 1994, many businesses in the area were hit hard. Many of the brick and marble buildings on the grounds still stand. The property and buildings were purchased in 2003 by the Benjamin Development Corporation. It was acquired by Olivet University in 2013 and now serves as the Evangelical Center. The buildings are currently being renovated and restored.

== Geography ==
According to the United States Census Bureau, the town has a total area of 56.3 square miles (145.9 km^{2}), of which 55.2 square miles (142.9 km^{2}) is land and 1.2 square miles (3.0 km^{2}), or 2.04%, is water. The town is drained by the Ten Mile River, which flows from the north through the center of town, then turns east into Connecticut and joins the Housatonic River.

The eastern town line is the border of Connecticut.

The Appalachian Trail passes through the town.

== Government and emergency services ==
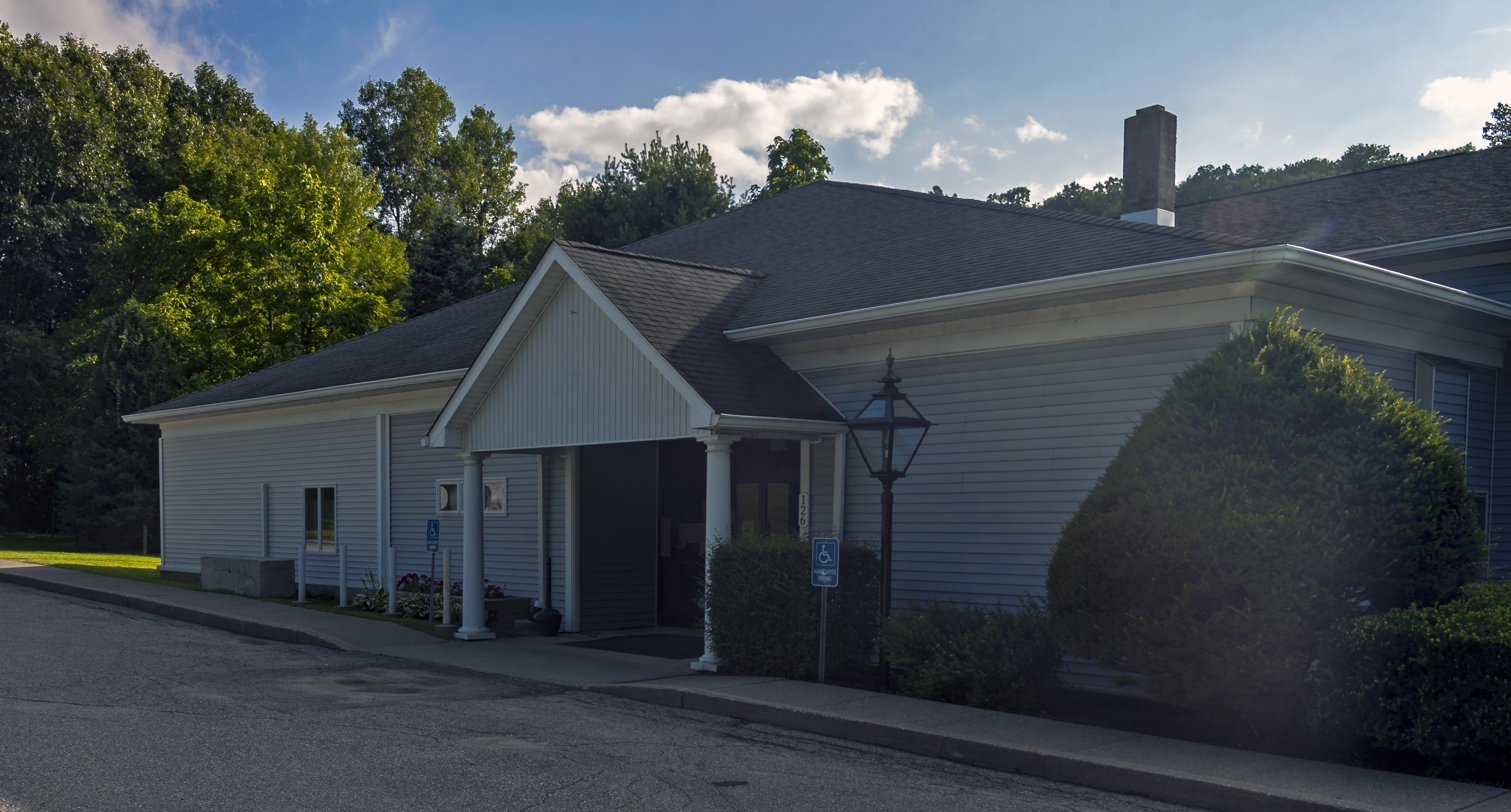
Town hall

The legislature and executive powers of the government of Dover are invested in the Town Board, consisting of the Town Supervisor, currently, elected to a two-year term, and four council members, each elected to four-year terms. The Town Board is accountable for the health, safety and welfare of all citizens. The body is responsible for adopting and amending the Town Comprehensive or Master Plan, and can adopt zoning and land use regulations or issue other permits in addition to performing various administrative functions.

=== Volunteer boards ===
The town government includes the following appointed boards:

The Architectural and Community Appearance Review Board reviews all proposals for all construction in excess of 1,000 square feet (93 m^{2}) of gross floor area and all signs to be erected on reviewed structures. Single-family residence proposals, two-family residence proposals and residence accessory structure proposals are normally not reviewed, except in special circumstances.

The Conservation Advisory Council advises the Town Board on matters affecting the preservation, quality and use of the natural resources and environment of the Town of Dover. The Superintendent appoints the CAC Chair, Evan van Hook.

The Planning Board considers site plans, subdivision proposals and special use permits. The Planning Board also reports on the adoption of official maps and amendments to zoning ordinance.

The Zoning Board of Appeals interprets zoning laws and considers variance requests, which are requests for relief from zoning law.

=== Departments ===
Departments of the town government include the following.

The Town of Dover Supervisor is currently Richard C. Yeno and the Town Board consists of four elected councilmembers.

The Town of Dover Town Clerk is currently Katie Palmer House. The Town Clerk is responsible for maintaining all town records and town residents and the public with a variety of services including obtaining marriage licenses and vital records; issuing dog licenses, DEC sportsmen (hunting and fishing) licenses, accessible parking permits and fulfills municipal FOIL requests.

The Assessor Department deal with tax-exemption and assessment related grievances.

The Building Department deals with building permits and code enforcement. This department can utilize inspections for enforcement.

The Highway Department is led by the Highway Superintendent who is an independent elected official. This department deals with road maintenance, road construction and road closures.

Recreation is headed by the Recreation Director who coordinates the public recreational services provided by or through the town such as Town Basketball, the public pool and the town day camp for children entering grades Pre-K to Sixth that is run at the public pool facility.

The Tax Collector or "Receiver of Taxes" is responsible for collection of town and county property taxes and is an independent elected official.

The Justice Court is the local court for the town of Dover which handles local issues such as traffic violations. Both town justices are elected officials.

== Demographics ==
Historical population
Census	Pop.	Note	%±
1820	2,193		—
1830	2,198		0.2%
1840	2,000		−9.0%
1850	2,146		7.3%
1860	2,305		7.4%
1870	2,279		−1.1%
1880	2,281		0.1%
1890	1,863		−18.3%
1900	1,959		5.2%
1910	2,016		2.9%
1920	1,710		−15.2%
1930	3,775		120.8%
1940	7,385		95.6%
1950	7,460		1.0%
1960	8,776		17.6%
1970	8,475		−3.4%
1980	7,261		−14.3%
1990	7,778		7.1%
2000	8,565		10.1%
2010	8,699		1.6%
2020	8,415		−3.3%
U.S. Decennial Census

As of the census of 2000, there were 8,565 people, 3,034 households, and 2,157 families residing in the town. The population density was 153.8 inhabitants per square mile (59.4/km^{2}). There were 3,266 housing units at an average density of 58.6 per square mile (22.6/km^{2}). The racial makeup of the town was 89.71% white, 5.5% African American, .33% Native American, .99% Asian, .06% Pacific Islander, 1.52% from other races, and 1.89% from two or more races. Hispanic or Latino of any race were 5.65% of the population.

There were 3,034 households, out of which 38.6% had children under the age of 18 living with them, 55.8% were married couples living together, 10.2% had a female householder with no husband present, and 28.9% were non-families. Of all households, 23.3% were made up of individuals, and 7.1% had someone living alone who was 65 years of age or older. The average household size was 2.74 and the average family size was 3.27.

In the town, the population was spread out, with 29.2% under the age of 18, 7.4% from 18 to 24, 32.2% from 25 to 44, 22.2% from 45 to 64, and 9.1% who were 65 years of age or older. The median age was 36 years. For every 100 females, there were 106.4 males. For every 100 females age 18 and over, there were 101.7 males.

The median income for a household in the town was $50,361, and the median income for a family was $57,979. Males had a median income of $40,885 versus $28,542 for females. The per capita income for the town was $21,250. About 6.3% of families and 8.4% of the population were below the poverty line, including 10.6% of those under age 18 and 6.5% of those age 65 or over.

== Transportation ==
=== Road ===
Although Dover has no major highways, it does have two major thoroughfares. Route 22 crosses from the Pawling town line in the south to the Amenia town line in the north. Route 343 goes through town as well. In 2006, the NYSDOT administered the repaving of Route 22 through the town. The prime contractor was Callanan Industries, Inc., an Albany, New York based contractor. In 2007, repaving continued north from the town line into Amenia, New York with other contractors - Peckham Road Corp. in Wassaic and A. Colarusso & Son Inc., a Hudson, New York based contractor for the portion north of Wassaic.

=== Rail ===
Metro-North Railroad's Harlem Line runs through Dover with two rail commuter rail stations in town, with service to New York City. The Harlem Valley – Wingdale station is at the former State Hospital and Route 22, and the Dover Plains station is right in the town center. Trains leave every two hours in each direction during middays, evenings and weekends. In rush hours, service in the peak direction operates about every 30 minutes.

=== Bus ===
Dover is served by Dutchess County Public Transit's route "D" bus.

== Communities and locations in Dover ==
- Bains Corner: An area east of Dover Plains.
- Chestnut Ridge: An area in the northwestern part of the town.
- Dogtail Corners: An area in the southeastern part of the town.
- Dover Furnace: An area in the central part of the town, south of Dover Plains, west of Route 22.
- Dover Plains: A hamlet in the northeastern section of the town.
- Duell Hollow: An area in the southeastern corner of the town.
- Ellis Pond: A small lake in the southeastern section of the town.
- Lake Weil: A small manmade lake in the southeastern part of the town.
- Oniontown: A community in the northern part of town.
- South Dover: A hamlet in the eastern part of the town.
- Webatuck: An area in the southeastern part of the town on Route 55.
- Wingdale: A hamlet in the southern part of the town on Route 22.

== Camps ==
Camp Ramah in the Berkshires is located in Wingdale on Lake Ellis.

== Electric power facilities ==
=== Cricket Valley Energy Center ===
Pursuant to Article 10 of the Public Service Law, Cricket Valley Energy Center LLC was granted a Certificate of Public Convenience and Necessity to build a 1,000-megawatt (MW) combined cycle natural gas powered plant in 2013. An Article VII Certificate of Environmental Compatibility and Public Need was granted on April 20, 2016, to build 345-kV transmission lines to interconnect to the site. The 1,100-MW project went into service in April 2020. There are three combustion turbines whose exhaust creates steam to drive a steam turbine. All of the turbines are manufactured by General Electric. It uses an air-cooled condenser to reduce water draw. It is located on a 193-acre former industrial area, the former Mid-Hudson Recycling Center, which was destroyed in a massive 1996 fire. It is fueled by natural gas supplied from a trunk pipeline, one of many that are located along the east coast. Its power is sold into the electric wholesale market administered by the NYISO.
