= Dover Plains, New York =

- Census-designated place
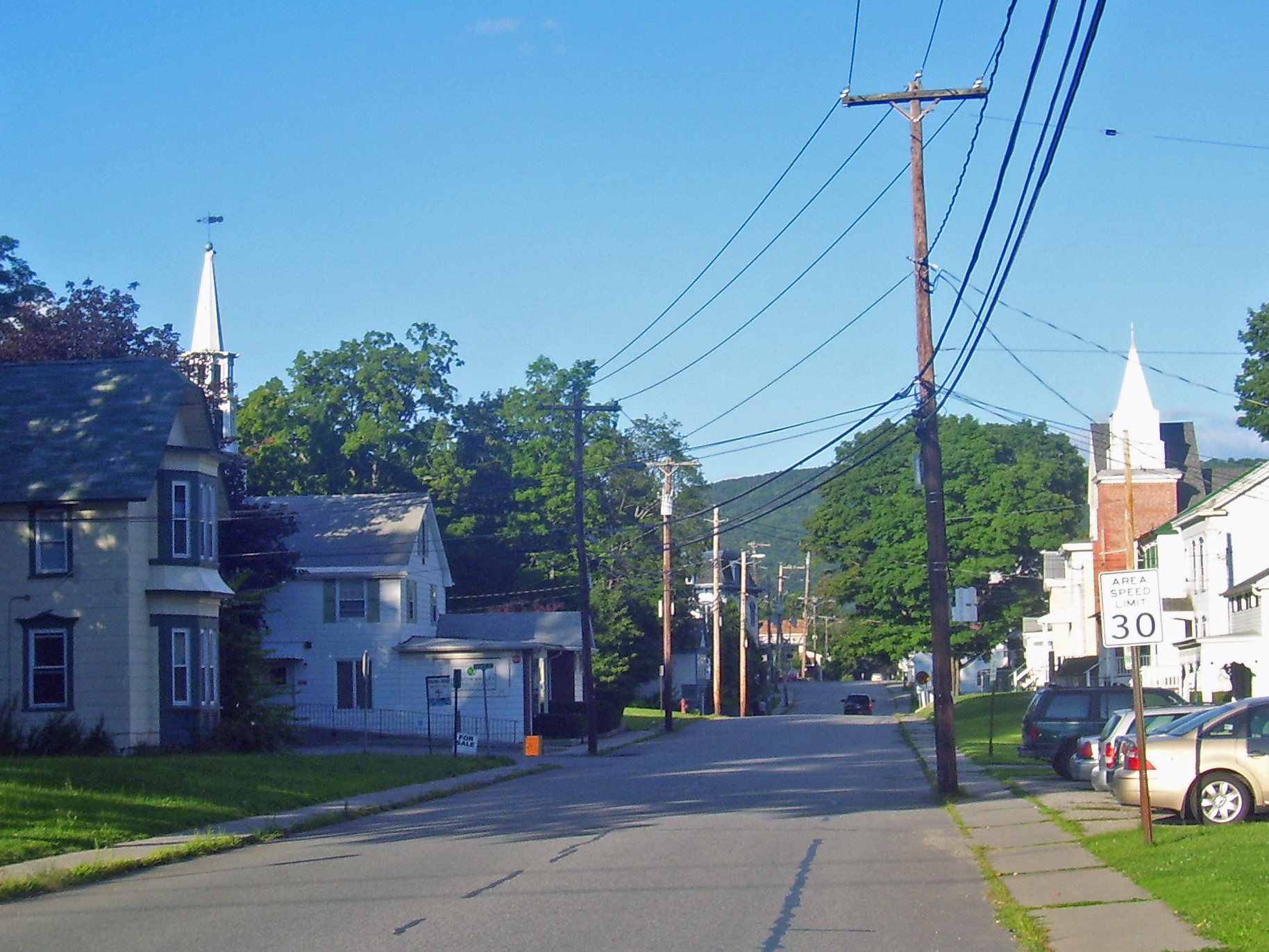
- East view along Mill Street

- Location of Dover Plains, New York
- Coordinates: 41°44′27″N 73°34′35″W
- Country: United States
- State: New York
- County: Dutchess
- Town: Dover

Area
  - Total: 0.70 sq mi (1.82 km^{2})
  - Land: 0.68 sq mi (1.77 km^{2})
  - Water: 0.019 sq mi (0.05 km^{2})
- Elevation: 400 ft (120 m)

Population (2020)
  - Total: 1,322
  - Density: 1,933.0/sq mi (746.32/km^{2})
- Time zone: UTC-5 (Eastern (EST))
  - Summer (DST): UTC-4 (EDT)
- ZIP code: 12522
- Area code: 845
- FIPS code: 36-20841
- GNIS feature ID: 0948613

Dover Plains is a hamlet and census-designated place (CDP) in Dutchess County, New York, United States. The population was 1,322 at the 2020 census. It is part of the Kiryas Joel–Poughkeepsie–Newburgh, NY Metropolitan Statistical Area.

Dover Plains is in the northern part of the town of Dover on NY Route 22.

Metro-North Railroad has a Harlem Line station here, bringing commuters to New York City. This station was the line's northern terminus until 1852 when the line was carried farther north to Chatham.

== History ==
It is not known when or by whom the first settlement was made in Dover Plains. Lawrence and Joseph ran the first store under the name Belding & Co. In 1802 the village had less than a dozen buildings. In 1806 Jonathan Mabbett and James Ketcham bought out the Beldings and ran the business under the name Mabbett & Ketcham. When the town of Dover was formed from the town of Pawling, James Ketcham became the first town clerk.

George Casey was the first postmaster. Mail was delivered on horseback. When Casey left, James Ketcham was appointed to succeed him; he held the post for thirty years until he was replaced during the administration of President James K. Polk. James Ketcham served in the War of 1812. He was Town Supervisor for five years and a member of the State Legislature in 1814. Dr. Thomas Hammond was a surgeon during the war. He commenced his practice in Dover Plains in 1824 and continued to 1869.

The Dover Plains Hotel was built by Beldin Dutcher in 1848. George Robson built Preston's Hotel, also in 1848. The Dover Plains Military Academy was established in 1880 by Arthur E. Bangs. This was the same year that the New York and Harlem Railroad extended the line from Croton Falls to Dover Plains.

In 1882 the postmaster was George T. Belding; the post office operated out of his store. James Ketcham's grandsons, William and John, were farmers who also had a successful marble business. At the time of the Civil War, John H. Ketcham was appointed to the War Committee for Dutchess and Columbia counties, and commissioned to raise a regiment. The 150th New York Infantry saw action at Gettysburg and during Sherman's March to the Sea. Wounded at Argyle Island, John H. Ketcham rose through the ranks to Brigadier general, later brevetted Major general. After leaving the service, he served at least seven terms in Congress. Dr. George Marvin Wellman came to Dover Plains in 1869, having served during the war as Ward Master in the hospitals in Washington, D.C.

David Maher was born in Ireland and came to Dover Plains in 1862. He owned the Dover Plains Marble Works. The weekly Dover Press was established in 1878 by Samuel B. Shaw. Seth Deacon's Dover Plains Review was established in 1908 and ran about a year. The Dover Plains Bank was organized in 1857 with officers David L. Belding as president and John H. Ketcham Vice President. It re-organized in 1865 as a national bank. The Reading Room Association was organized in 1877 by the Rev. James M. Bruce and others. Samuel B. Shaw was the first secretary. The Dover Plains Library was established about 1899.

The J.H. Ketcham Hose Co. was organized in 1903. Dr. George B. Chapman owned Midfield Dairy Farm. He served on the Board of Education in 1908 when the new Union Free School at Dover was established. The McDermott Milk Company had a large factory at Dover Plains, processing 100 cans of milk a day. Hall & Ferguson's cold storage plant had a capacity for 15,000 barrels of fruit.

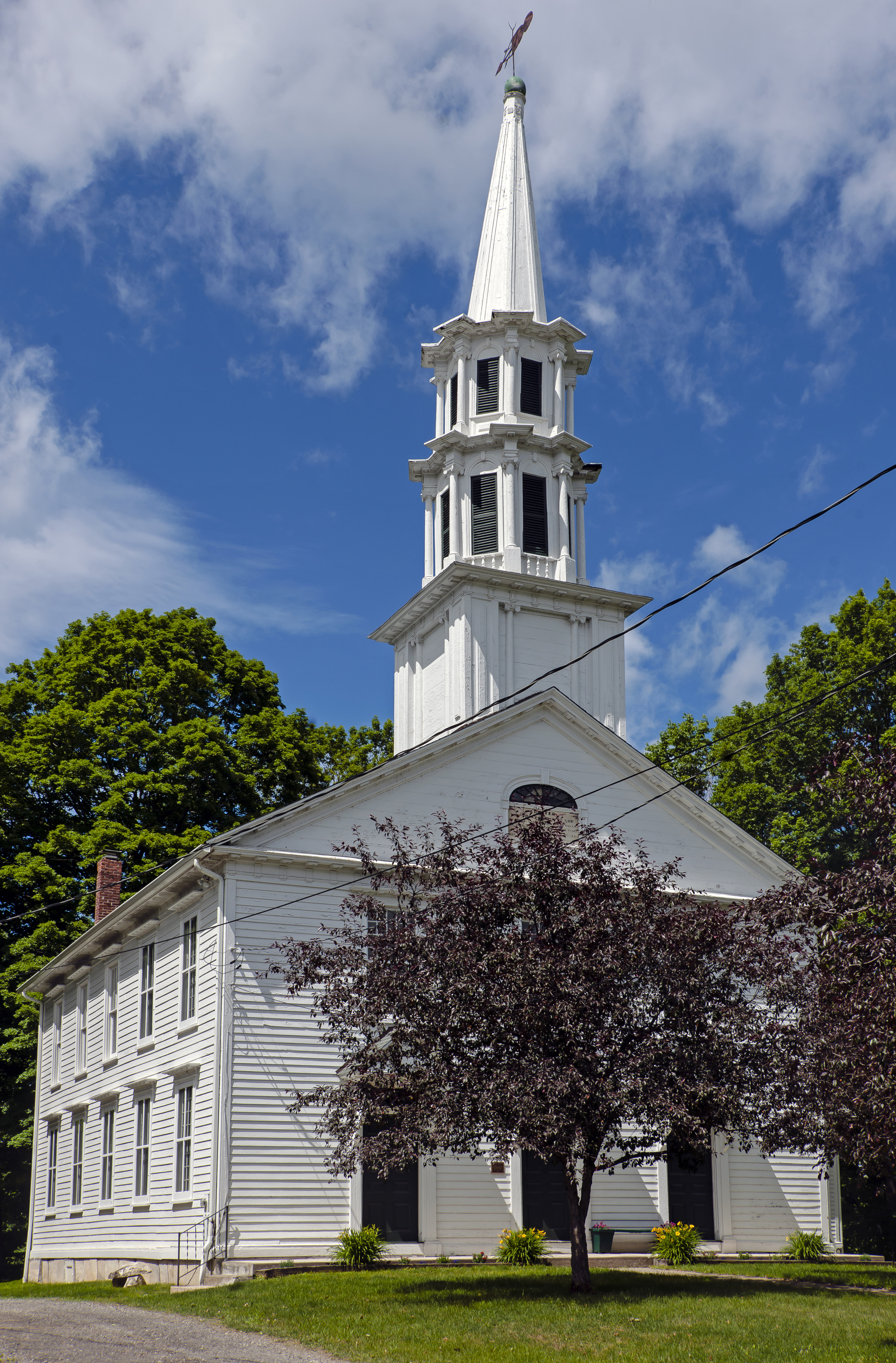
Second Baptist Church of Dover Plains

=== Historic Buildings ===
==== Second Dover Baptist Church ====
The Second Baptist Church of Dover was organized in 1794. It developed from the First Baptist Church in Pawlingstown (South Dover). elder Seth Higby was the first pastor. Meetings were held in an empty pre-Revolutionary house built for the Dutch Reformed Church on the site of the later Valley View Cemetery. The church building was dedicated in 1833. It was added to the National Register of Historic Places in 2010.

==== Tabor-Wing House ====
The Tabor-Wing House was built in 1810 by Thomas Tabor. Tabor came Dover as a young boy with his father from Rhode Island in 1748, when it was largely uninhabited by European settlers. His father willed him his landholdings, including all of present-day Dover Plains, upon his death in 1782. Thomas in turn willed it to his daughter Sally, who married Mahlon Wing. It was acquired in the late 1970s by the Dover Historical Society, and put into service as a library. In 2001 the library moved to larger quarters and the Historical Society donated the Tabor-Wing House to the town, which now uses it for offices and a local history room.

=== Churches ===
==== Methodist Episcopal ====
The Methodist Episcopal Church of Dover Plains was organized in 1852.

==== St. James Episcopal Church ====
St. James Episcopal Church was built by Rector Alexander Hamilton in 1904.

== Geography ==
Dover Plains is located in eastern Dutchess County at 41°44′43″N 73°34′47″W (41.745294, -73.579831), in the northern part of the town of Dover.

According to the United States Census Bureau, the CDP has a total area of 0.69 square miles (1.8 km^{2}), of which 0.02 square miles (0.04 km^{2}), or 2.19%, is water. Dover Plains is in the valley of the Ten Mile River.

== Demographics ==
Historical population
Census	Pop.	Note	%±
2000	1,996		—
2010	1,323		−33.7%
2020	1,322		−0.1%
U.S. Decennial Census

As of the census of 2000, there were 1996 people, 834 households, and 503 families residing in the CDP. The population density was 1,639.8 inhabitants per square mile (633.1/km^{2}). There were 892 housing units at an average density of 732.8 per square mile (282.9/km^{2}). The racial makeup of the CDP was 93.79% White, 2.40% African American, 0.30% Native American, 1.25% Asian, 0.10% Pacific Islander, 0.40% from other races, and 1.75% from two or more races. Hispanic or Latino of any race were 4.61% of the population.

There were 834 households, out of which 28.5% had children under the age of 18 living with them, 44.5% were married couples living together, 11.2% had a female householder with no husband present, and 39.6% were non-families. 34.9% of all households were made up of individuals, and 17.0% had someone living alone who was 65 years of age or older. The average household size was 2.35 and the average family size was 3.02.

In the CDP, the population was spread out, with 23.0% under the age of 18, 6.9% from 18 to 24, 27.3% from 25 to 44, 22.1% from 45 to 64, and 20.7% who were 65 years of age or older. The median age was 41 years. For every 100 females, there were 98.8 males. For every 100 females age 18 and over, there were 95.3 males.

The median income for a household in the CDP was $31,979, and the median income for a family was $45,586. Males had a median income of $36,442 versus $26,776 for females. The per capita income for the CDP was $20,676. About 8.6% of families and 13.4% of the population were below the poverty line, including 11.9% of those under age 18 and 15.1% of those age 65 or over.

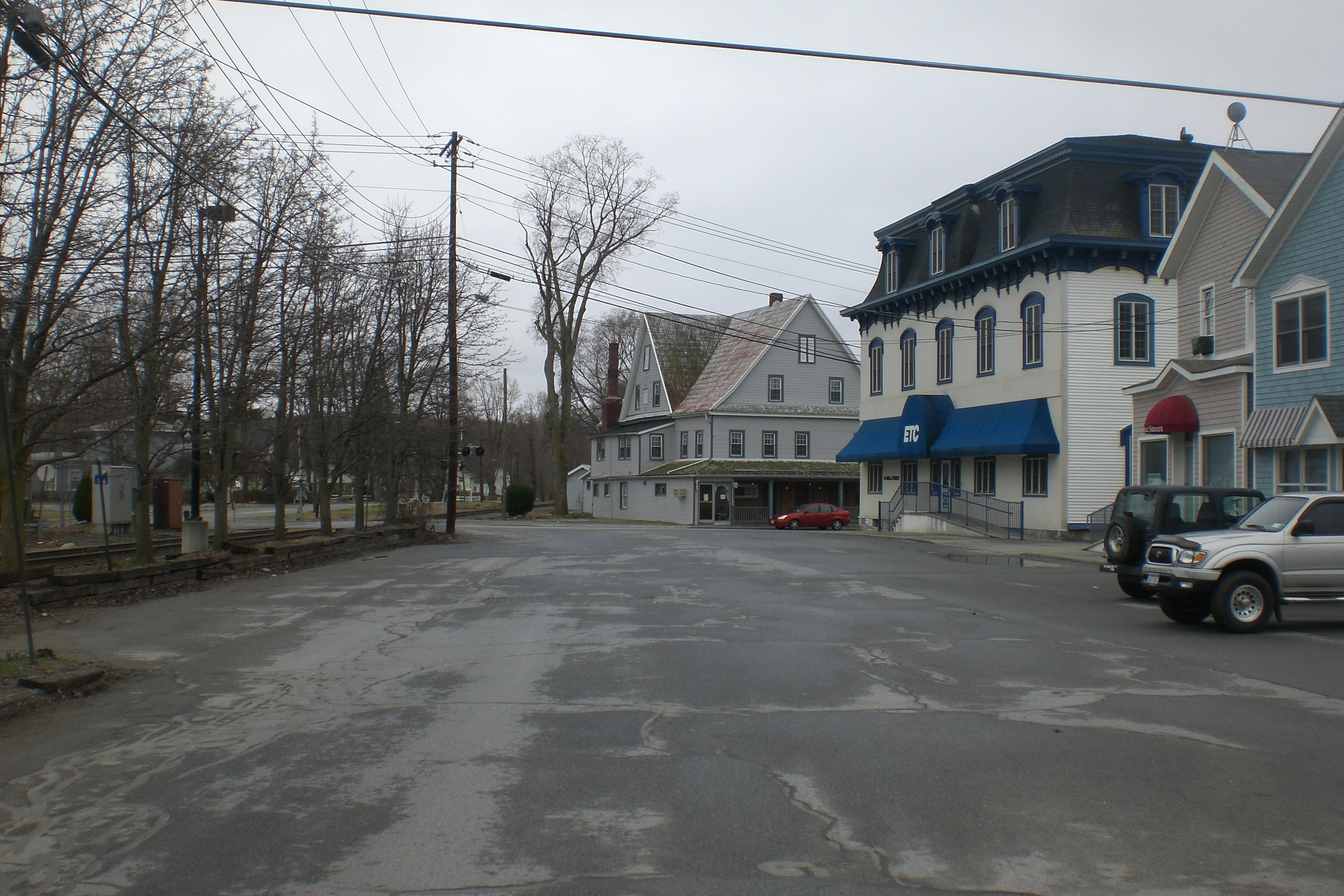
Downtown near train station
