= Cripple (disambiguation) =

A cripple is a person or animal with a physical disability; the term is now pejorative when referring to a person.

Cripple may also refer to:

== Streams in the United States ==
- Cripple Creek (Colorado)
- Cripple Creek (New York)
- Cripple Creek (East Fork Stones River), Tennessee
- Cripple Creek (Virginia)

== Other uses ==
- Cripple Clarence Lofton, stage name of Albert or Clarence Clemens (died 1957), American boogie-woogie pianist and singer
- "Krøblingen" ("The Cripple"), an 1872 short story by Hans Christian Andersen
- Cripple Dick, a strong beer brewed by the St Austell Brewery
- Cripple studs, a type of wall studs.
- "Cripples", a supposed nickname for Crips in its early history.
- A nickname for locomotives and railroad cars in a cripple track.

== See also ==
- Hermann of Reichenau (1013–1054), Benedectine monk known as Hermann the Cripple
- Charles "Charley the Cripple" Vitoffsky, a member of the Yiddish Black Hand New York City crime gang
- Crippled
- Crippler
