= Cripple Creek =

Cripple Creek may refer to:

== Populated places in the United States ==
- Cripple Creek, Colorado, a statutory city and county seat
- Cripple Creek, Virginia, an unincorporated community

== Streams in the United States ==
- Cripple Creek (Colorado)
- Cripple Creek (New York)
- Cripple Creek (East Fork Stones River), Tennessee
- Cripple Creek (Virginia)

== Songs ==
- "Cripple Creek" (folk song), a traditional folk song
- "Cripple Creek" by Skip Spence on the album Oar
- "Cripple Creek Ferry", by Neil Young on his album After the Gold Rush
- "Up on Cripple Creek", by The Band on the album The Band

== Films ==
- Cripple Creek (film), a 1952 Western
