= Trout Brook (Otsego Lake tributary) =

Trout Brook White Creek
- Location of the mouth of Trout Brook Trout Brook (Otsego Lake tributary) (the United States)

Location
- Country: United States
- State: New York
- Region: Central New York Region
- County: Otsego
- Town: Springfield

Physical characteristics
- Source: Allen Lake
  - location: Southeast of Richfield Springs
  - coordinates: 42°49′38″N 74°56′59″W
  - elevation: 1,640 ft (500 m)
- Mouth: Otsego Lake
  - location: South of Springfield Center
  - coordinates: 42°48′26″N 74°53′45″W
  - elevation: 1,191 ft (363 m)

Basin features
- Progression: Trout Brook → Otsego Lake → Susquehanna River → Chesapeake Bay → Atlantic Ocean

Trout Brook, also known as White Creek, is a river that is located in northern Otsego County, New York. The river starts at the outlet of Allen Lake and flows southeast before flowing into Otsego Lake south of Springfield Center. It is a third-order tributary on the northwest side of Otsego Lake and has an average gradient of 96 feet/mile.
