= Cripple Creek (New York) =

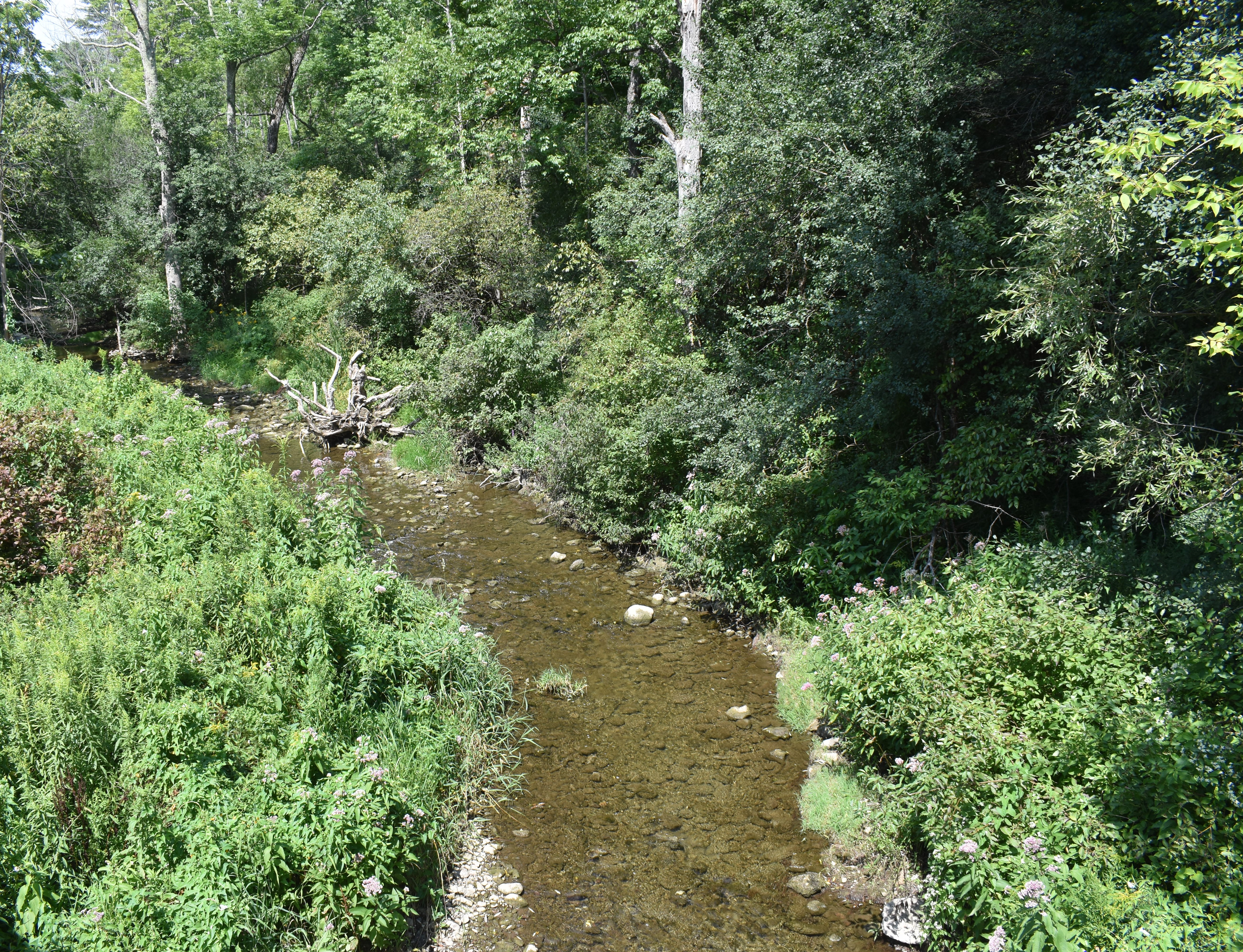
- Cripple Creek at Bartlett Road

- Location of the mouth of Cripple Creek Cripple Creek (New York) (the United States)

Location
- Country: United States
- State: New York
- Counties: Herkimer, Otsego
- Towns: Warren, Springfield

Physical characteristics
- Source
  - location: Northeast of Warren
  - coordinates: 42°51′17″N 74°54′35″W
  - elevation: 1,348 feet (411 m)
- Mouth: Otsego Lake
  - location: South of Springfield Center
  - coordinates: 42°48′46″N 74°53′40″W
  - elevation: 1,194 ft (364 m)
- Length: 2.1 miles (3.4 km)
- Basin size: 17.6 sq mi (46 km^{2})

Basin features
- Progression: Cripple Creek → Otsego Lake → Susquehanna River → Chesapeake Bay → Atlantic Ocean

Cripple Creek is a river in southern Herkimer County and northern Otsego County in the state of New York. It begins northeast of Warren and flows through Weaver Lake then Young Lake before flowing into Otsego Lake south of Springfield Center. Was formally referred to as Lawyers Creek.

== Course ==
Cripple Creek flows through Clarke Pond before discharging into Otsego Lake.
