= Weaver Lake (New York) =

Lake in Herkimer County, New York, US

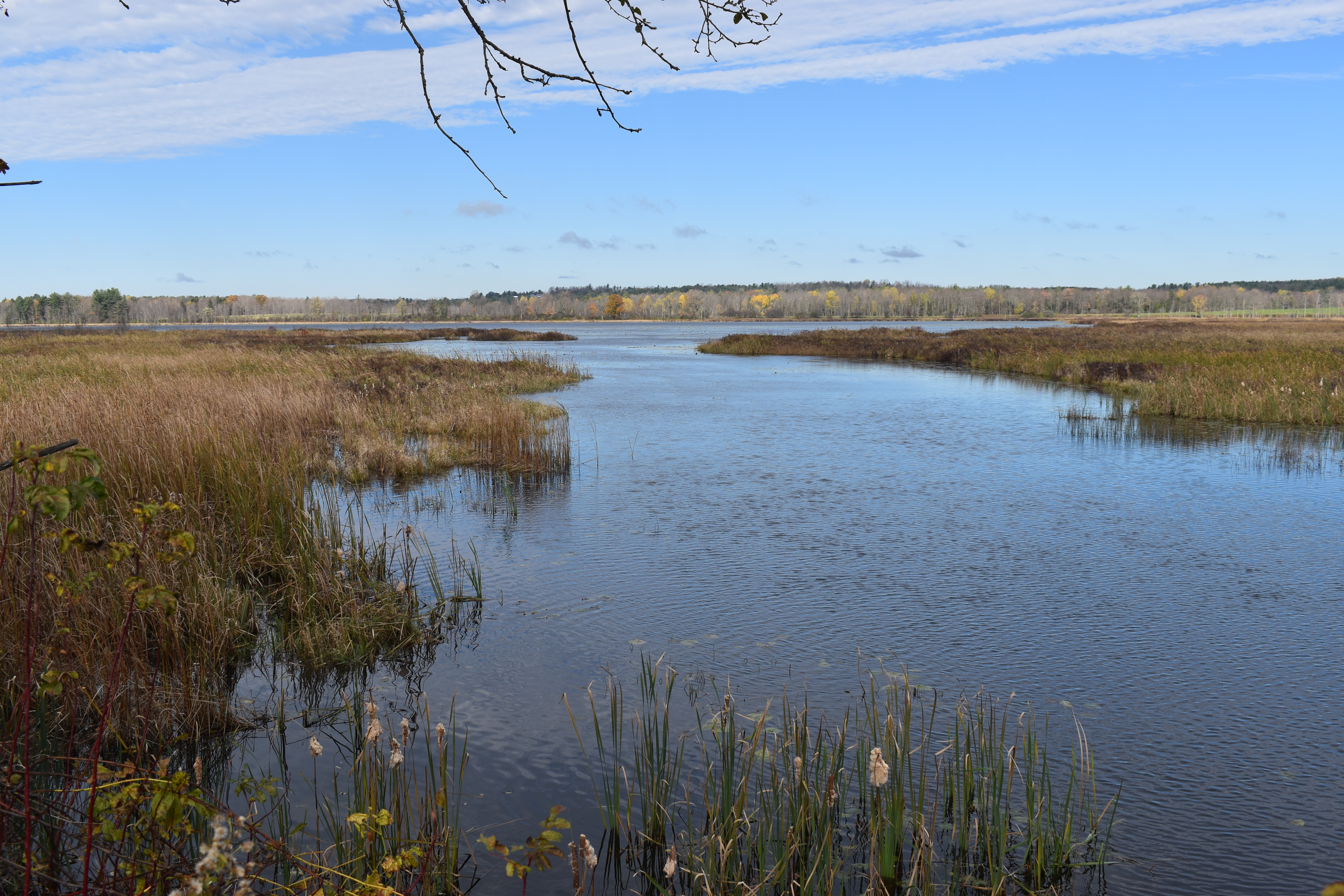
- Weaver Lake from boat launch

- Location within New York Weaver Lake (the United States)
- Location: Warren, Herkimer County, New York
- Coordinates: 42°51′14″N 74°55′53″W
- Primary inflows: Cripple Creek, Maumee Swamp
- Primary outflows: Cripple Creek
- Surface area: 76.9 acres (31.1 ha)
- Average depth: 7.1 feet (2.2 m)
- Max. depth: 11 feet (3.4 m)
- Water volume: 178,036,363 US gallons (673,940.95 m^{3})
- Shore length^{1}: 1.9 miles (3.1 km)
- Surface elevation: 1,348 feet (411 m)
- ^{1} Shore length is not a well-defined measure.

Weaver Lake, also called Weavers Lake, is located in the town of Warren in Herkimer County, New York. Maumee Swamp is located north of and drains into Weaver Lake. Weaver Lake is north of and drains into Young Lake. Weaver and Young Lakes are collectively known as either "Waiontha Lakes" or "the Little Lakes". Waiontha Mountain, located southwest was named after the Waiontha Lakes.

== Fishing ==
Fish species present in the lake are black crappie, brown bullhead, chain pickerel, golden shiner, largemouth bass, pumpkinseed sunfish, rock bass, white sucker, and yellow perch. There is a New York State Department of Environmental Conservation (NYSDEC) hand launch west of the hamlet of Warren on US 20, and only electric motors are allowed.
