= Samuel P. Kenyon =

American soldier who fought in the American Civil War

- Born: 1846; Ira, New York
- Died: June 14, 1884 (aged 37–38); Cullen, New York
- Burial place: Richfield Springs, New York
- Military career
- Allegiance: United States of America
- Branch: United States Army
- Service years: 1864 - 1865
- Rank: Quartermaster Sergeant
- Units: (New York (state)) Company B, 24th New York Cavalry
- Conflicts: Battle of Sailor's Creek; American Civil War
- Awards: Medal of Honor

Samuel P. Kenyon (1846 – June 14, 1884) was an American soldier who fought in the American Civil War. Kenyon received his country's highest award for bravery during combat, the Medal of Honor. Kenyon's medal was won for his capturing a flag at the Battle of Sailor's Creek, Virginia on April 6, 1865 He was honored with the award on May 3, 1865.

Kenyon was born in Ira, New York, the son of Rev. Henry and Betsy (nee Brown) Kenyon. He joined the 24th New York Cavalry from Augusta, New York in February 1864. He was transferred to the 1st New York Provisional Cavalry in June 1865, and mustered out with this regiment the following month. Kenyon was buried at Lakeview Cemetery in Richfield Springs, New York.

== Medal of Honor citation ==
The President of the United States of America, in the name of Congress, takes pleasure in presenting the Medal of Honor to Private Samuel P. Kenyon, United States Army, for extraordinary heroism on 6 April 1865, while serving with Company B, 24th New York Cavalry, in action at Deatonsville (Sailor's Creek), Virginia, for capture of battle flag.

== See also ==
- List of American Civil War Medal of Honor recipients: G–L
