= Young Lake =

Lake in Herkimer County, New York, United States

Youngs Lake
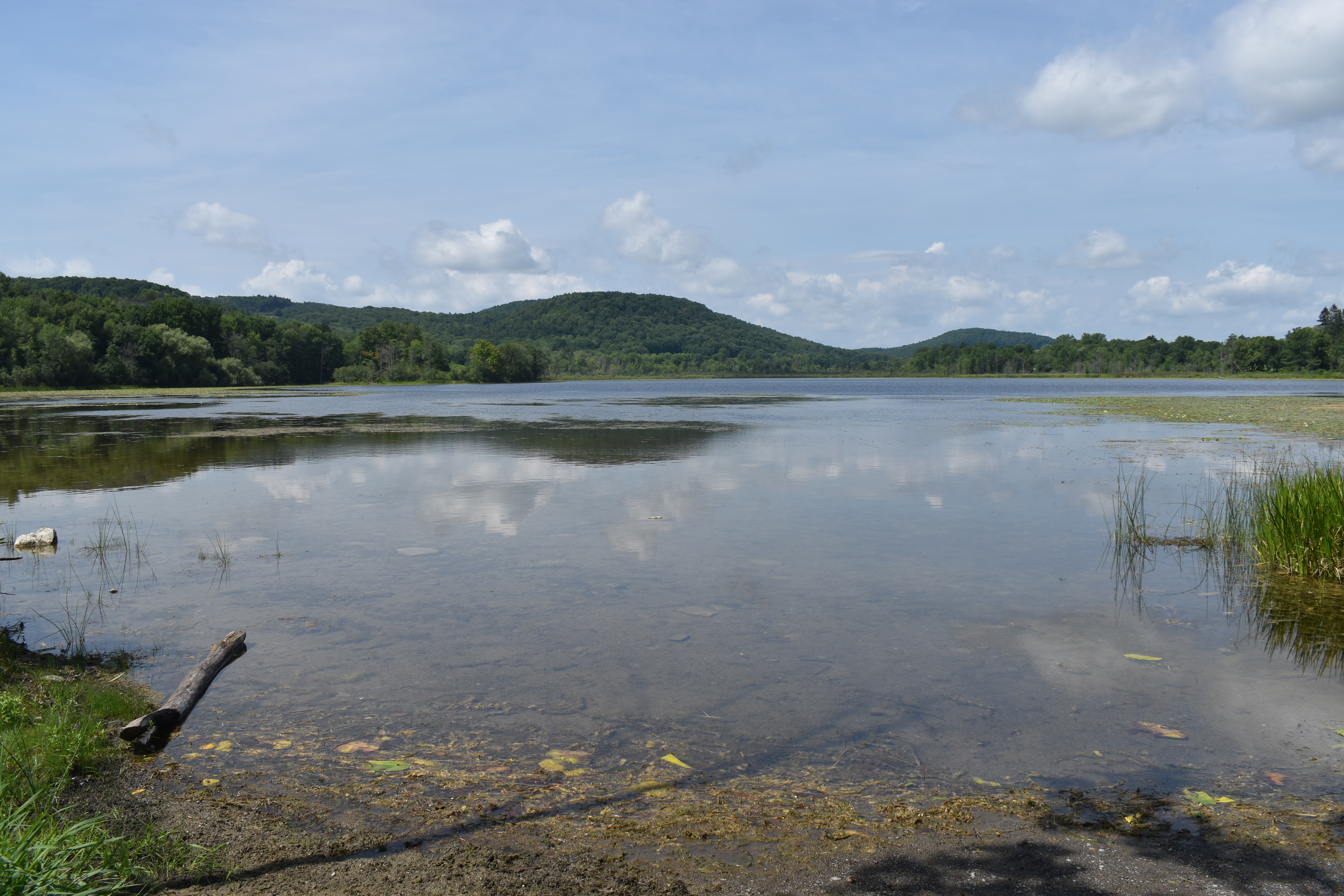
- Youngs Lake from eastern shore

- Location within New York Youngs Lake (the United States)
- Location: Warren, Herkimer County, New York
- Coordinates: 42°50′38″N 74°55′14″W
- Primary inflows: Cripple Creek
- Primary outflows: Cripple Creek
- Surface area: 19.19 acres (0.0777 km^{2})
- Average depth: 10.11 feet (3.08 m)
- Max. depth: 17 feet (5.2 m)
- Water volume: 63,285,194 US gallons (239,560.52 m^{3})
- Surface elevation: 1,345 feet (410 m)

Youngs Lake is located in the town of Warren in Herkimer County, New York. Weaver Lake is north of and drains into Youngs Lake. Youngs Lake is south of Weaver Lake, the two are collectively known as either "Waiontha Lakes" or "the Little Lakes". Waiontha Mountain, located west was named after the Waiontha Lakes.

== Fishing ==
Most of the fishing done on the lake is done in the winter months in the form of ice fishing. Fish species present in the lake are blue gill, yellow perch and black crappie.
