= Weatherby Pond =

Lake in New York, United States

- Location of Weatherby Pond within New York State
- Location: Herkimer County, New York
- Coordinates: 42°51′52″N 74°58′22″W
- Surface area: 4 acres (1.6 ha)
- Surface elevation: 1,335 feet (407 m)
- Settlements: Richfield Springs, New York

Weatherby Pond is a small lake located northeast of the Village of Richfield Springs in the Town of Warren in Herkimer County, New York. It was the original water supply for the Village of Richfield Springs before Allen Lake was purchased by the village.
