= Warren Ferris House =

Historic house in New York, United States

- U.S. National Register of Historic Places
- Location within New York Location within the United States
- Location: 7637 NY Route 80, Springfield Center, New York
- Area: 1 acre (0.40 ha)
- Built: 1894
- Architectural style: Queen Anne
- NRHP reference No.: 16000063
- Added to NRHP: March 08, 2016

The Warren Ferris House is a historic home located in Springfield Center, New York. It was built in 1894 by Warren Ferris. It is a two and one-half story tall wood-framed building on a cut-stone foundation, in the Queen Anne style. The building is characterized by irregular massing, as it is divided into four distinct sections, decreasing in size from front to rear. There is also a contemporary carriage house also constructed in 1894.

It was added to the National Register of Historic Places in 2016.
