= Springfield Center Elementary School =

- U.S. National Register of Historic Places
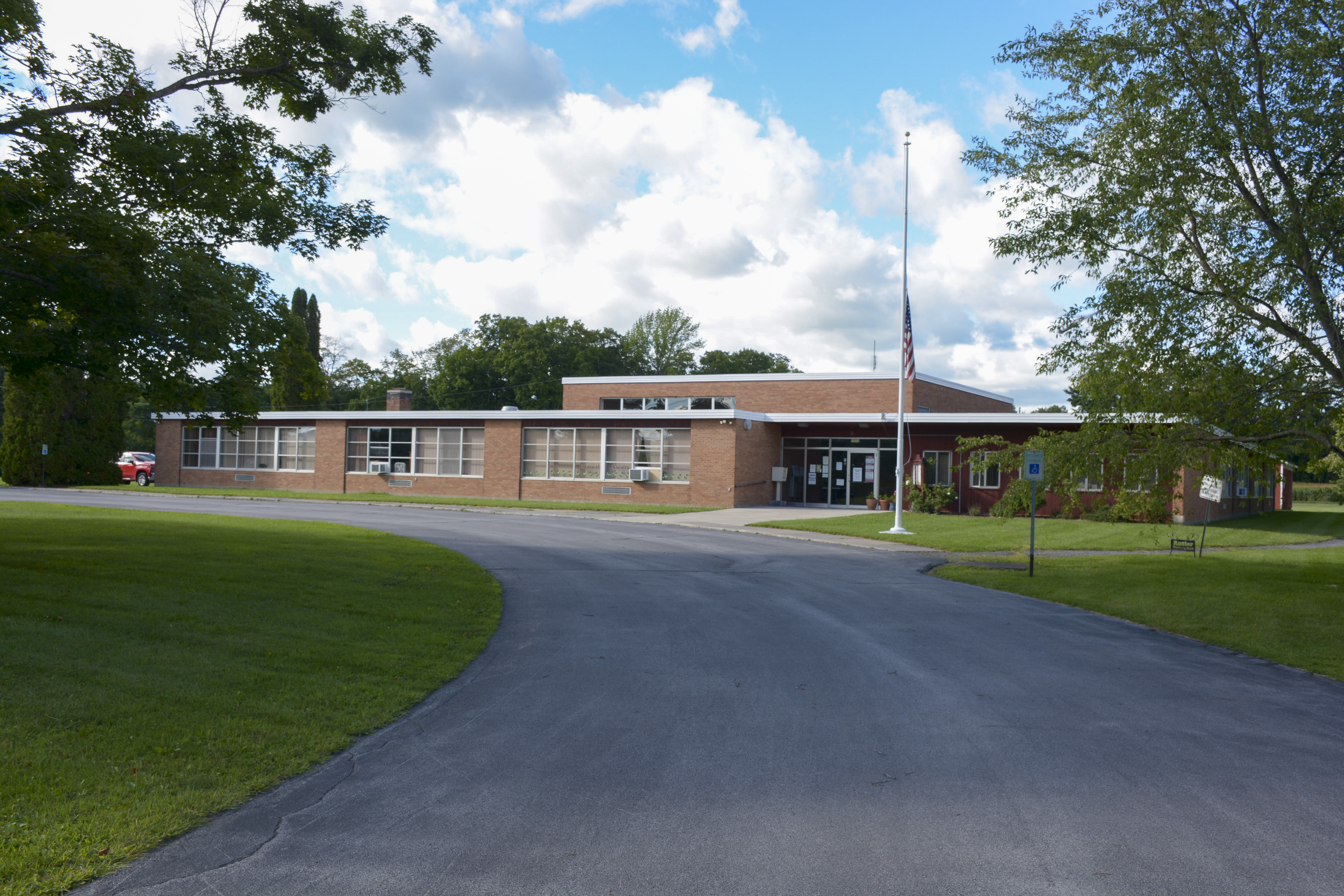

- Location within New York Location within the United States
- Location: 129 County Road 29A; Springfield Center, New York
- Coordinates: 42°49′56″N 74°51′46″W
- Area: 9.23 acres (3.74 ha)
- Built: 1958
- Architect: Myron A. Jordan
- Architectural style: Modern Movement
- NRHP reference No.: 11000601
- Added to NRHP: August 24, 2011

Springfield Center Elementary School is a historic elementary school located at Springfield Center in Otsego County, New York. It was built in 1958, and is a one-story, L-shaped, Modern Movement style school building. It is a steel-frame building faced in brick and with a flat roof. It features long continuous bands of windows. The school closed in 1989, and the building houses the town court, offices, and library.

It was listed on the National Register of Historic Places in 2011.
