= Maumee Swamp =

- Location within New York
- Location: Herkimer County, New York
- Nearest city: Warren, New York
- Coordinates: 42°51′39″N 74°56′16″W

Maumee Swamp is located north of and drains into Weaver Lake. It is located northwest of Warren, New York.
