= Warren, New York =

Town in Herkimer County, New York, US

- Town
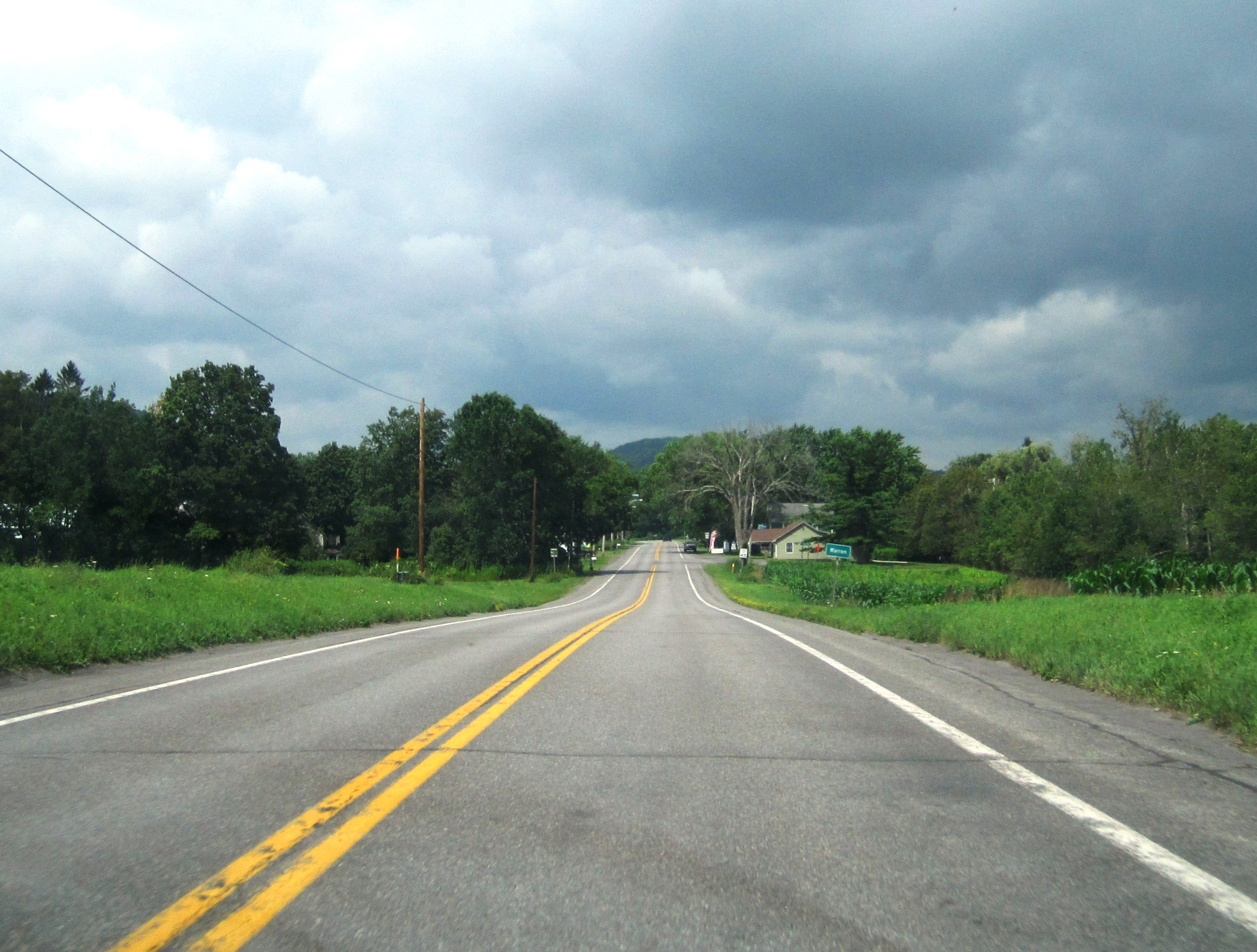
- Hamlet of Warren within the town along US 20 westbound

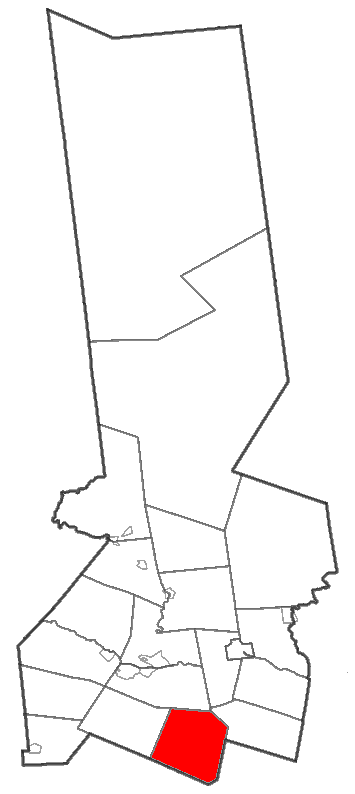
- Location of Warren in Herkimer County

- Location within New York Location within the United States
- Coordinates: 42°53′15″N 74°56′7″W
- Country: United States
- State: New York
- County: Herkimer

Government
  - Type: Town Council
  - Town Supervisor: Richard A. Jack (R)
  - Town Council: Members' List: • Leslie Miller (Agriculture); • Donald Oldick (Pine Tree); • Roger S. Vaughn (R); • Dorayne Peplinski (We the People)

Area
  - Total: 38.37 sq mi (99.38 km^{2})
  - Land: 38.05 sq mi (98.55 km^{2})
  - Water: 0.32 sq mi (0.83 km^{2})
- Elevation: 1,457 ft (444 m)

Population (2010)
  - Total: 1,143
  - Estimate (2016): 1,106
  - Density: 29.1/sq mi (11.22/km^{2})
- Time zone: UTC-5 (Eastern (EST))
  - Summer (DST): UTC-4 (EDT)
- ZIP Codes: 13361 (Jordanville); 13407 (Mohawk); 13439 (Richfield Springs)
- FIPS code: 36-043-78278
- GNIS feature ID: 0979597
- Website: https://townofwarren.net/

There is also a Warren County, and a hamlet of Warren.

Warren is a town in Herkimer County, New York, United States. The population was 1,143 at the 2010 census. The town is named after General Joseph Warren, who was killed at the Battle of Bunker Hill. Warren is in the south part of Herkimer County. US 20 passes across the town.

== History ==
The area was first settled prior to 1776. The town of Warren was created in 1796 from the town of German Flatts. In 1812, part of Warren was used to form the newer town of Columbia. The population of Warren in 1865 was 1,611. Sunset Hill was added to the National Register of Historic Places in 2007.

== Geography ==
According to the United States Census Bureau, the town has a total area of 38.1 square miles (98.7 km^{2}), of which 37.8 square miles (97.9 km^{2}) are land and 0.3 square miles (0.8 km^{2}), or 0.84%, are water. The town is northeast of Canadarago Lake and Richfield Springs. The southern and eastern town lines are the border of Otsego County.

== Demographics ==
Historical population
| Census | Pop. | Note | %± |
|---|---|---|---|
| 1820 | 2,015 | | — |
| 1830 | 2,084 | | 3.4% |
| 1840 | 2,003 | | −3.9% |
| 1850 | 1,756 | | −12.3% |
| 1860 | 1,812 | | 3.2% |
| 1870 | 1,503 | | −17.1% |
| 1880 | 1,430 | | −4.9% |
| 1890 | 1,339 | | −6.4% |
| 1900 | 1,240 | | −7.4% |
| 1910 | 1,071 | | −13.6% |
| 1920 | 959 | | −10.5% |
| 1930 | 974 | | 1.6% |
| 1940 | 873 | | −10.4% |
| 1950 | 956 | | 9.5% |
| 1960 | 918 | | −4.0% |
| 1970 | 978 | | 6.5% |
| 1980 | 1,065 | | 8.9% |
| 1990 | 1,077 | | 1.1% |
| 2000 | 1,133 | | 5.2% |
| 2010 | 1,143 | | 0.9% |
| 2016 (est.) | 1,106 | | −3.2% |
U.S. Decennial Census

As of the census of 2000, there were 1,136 people, 390 households, and 290 families residing in the town. The population density was 29.8 inhabitants per square mile (11.5/km^{2}). There were 440 housing units at an average density of 11.5 per square mile (4.4/km^{2}). The racial makeup of the town was 97.10% White, 0.62% African American, 0.26% Native American, 0.26% Asian, 0.18% from other races, and 1.58% from two or more races. Hispanic or Latino of any race were 1.32% of the population.

There were 390 households, out of which 32.3% had children under the age of 18 living with them, 63.3% were married couples living together, 5.1% had a female householder with no husband present, and 25.6% were non-families. 22.3% of all households were made up of individuals, and 10.8% had someone living alone who was 65 years of age or older. The average household size was 2.69 and the average family size was 3.09.

In the town, the population was spread out, with 23.0% under the age of 18, 10.0% from 18 to 24, 27.5% from 25 to 44, 24.3% from 45 to 64, and 15.2% who were 65 years of age or older. The median age was 39 years. For every 100 females, there were 125.8 males. For every 100 females age 18 and over, there were 127.9 males.

The median income for a household in the town was $36,548, and the median income for a family was $39,118. Males had a median income of $27,000 versus $19,297 for females. The per capita income for the town was $13,840. About 8.5% of families and 12.3% of the population were below the poverty line, including 14.0% of those under age 18 and 11.2% of those age 65 or over.

== Communities and locations in Warren ==
- Crains Corners – A location east of Jordanville.
- Cullen – A location south of Jordanville. The Church of the Good Shepherd was listed on the National Register of Historic Places in 1997.
- Harter Hill – An elevation located north of Jordanville.
- Holy Trinity Monastery – A Russian orthodox monastery near Jordanville.
- Jordanville – The hamlet of Jordanville is in the northwestern part of the town.
- Kingdom – A hamlet at the town line, northwest of Jordanville; partially in the Town of Columbia.
- Maumee Swamp – A swamp located north of Weaver Lake.
- Merry Hill – An elevation located northeast of the hamlet of Warren.
- Mud Lake – A small lake located southeast of Crains Corners.
- Murray Hill – An elevation located north of Crains Corners.
- Warren – The hamlet of Warren is in the southeastern part of the town on Route 20. It was previously called "Little Lakes."
- Weatherby Pond – A pond located west-northwest of the hamlet of Warren.
- Weaver Lake – A small lake northwest of Warren village.
- Young Lake – A small lake south of Warren village.

== Notable person ==
- Roxalana Druse, who was convicted of murdering her husband, William Druse, with the help of her daughter and nephew. Mrs. Druse was executed in 1887 by hanging.
