= Church of the Good Shepherd (Cullen, New York) =

Historic church in New York, United States

- U.S. National Register of Historic Places
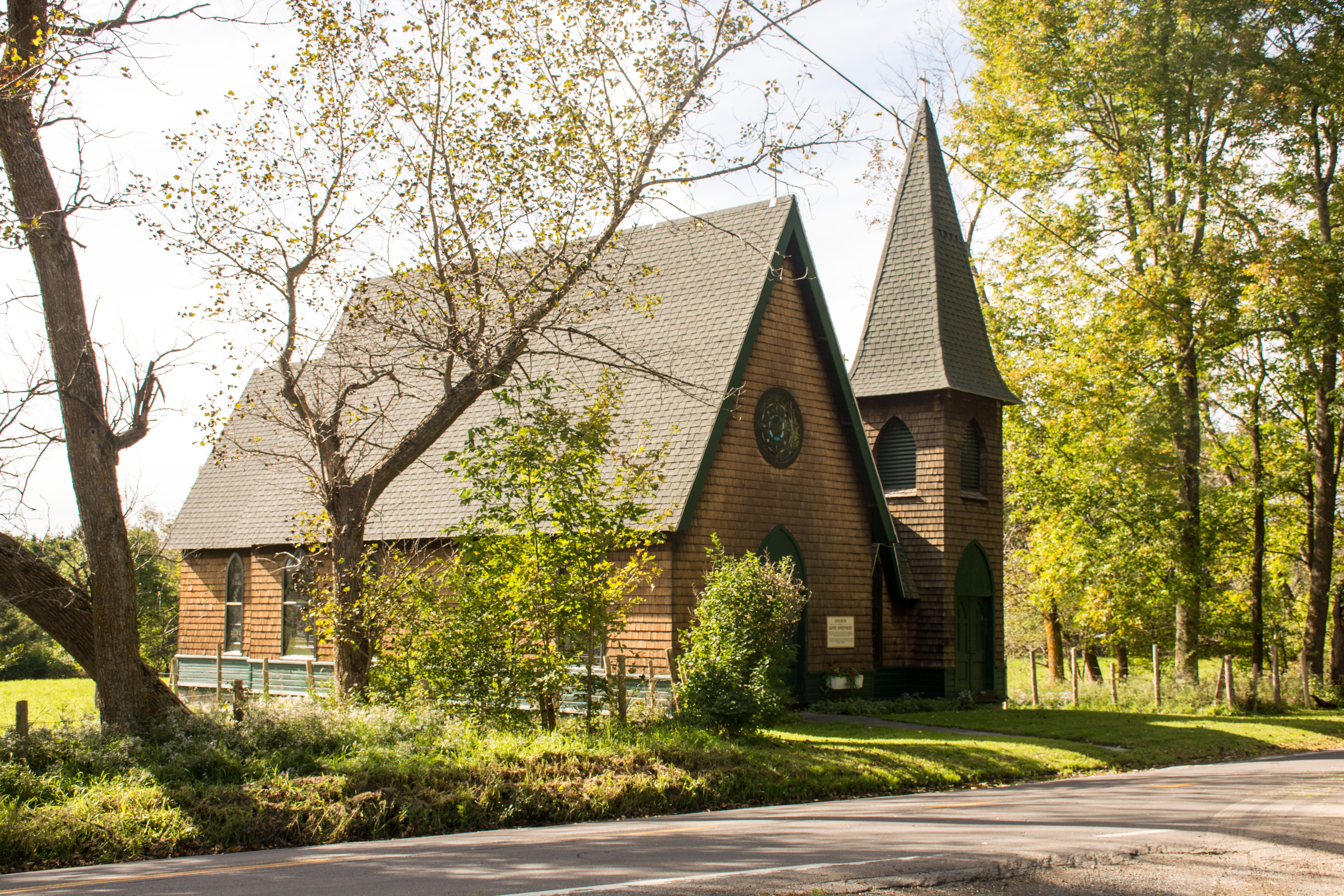

- Location within New York Location within the United States
- Nearest city: Cullen, New York
- Coordinates: 42°52′57″N 74°57′48″W
- Area: less than one acre
- Built: 1892
- Architectural style: Late Victorian, Gothic
- NRHP reference No.: 97000943
- Added to NRHP: August 21, 1997

Church of the Good Shepherd is a historic Episcopal, rural family chapel at Cullen in Herkimer County, New York. It was built in 1892 and consists of a rectangular nave with gable ends and a separate square tower connected by a hyphen. The wood-frame structure with horizontal sheathing is on a foundation of rough cut stone. It features Gothic details. It was built by Dunham J. Crain for his family estate "Cullenwood."

It was listed on the National Register of Historic Places in 1997.
