= St. Mary's Episcopal Church (Springfield Center, New York) =

Historic church in New York, United States

- St. Mary's Episcopal Church Complex
- U.S. National Register of Historic Places
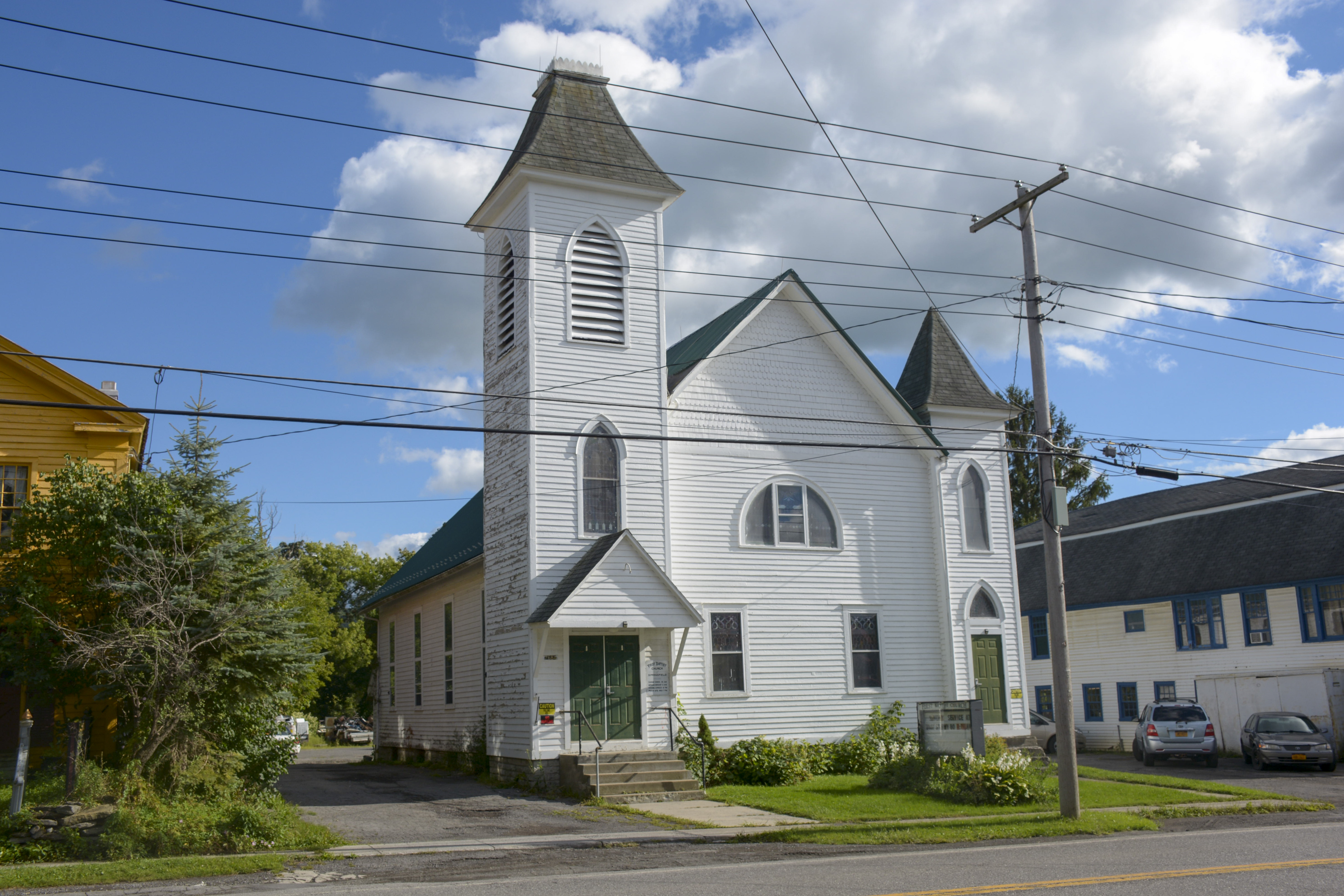

- Location within New York Location within the United States
- Location: 7690 NY 80; Springfield Center, New York
- Coordinates: 42°49′45″N 74°52′44″W
- Area: 2.4 acres (0.97 ha)
- Built: 1899, 1902, 1910-1911
- Architect: C.C. Edgerton
- Architectural style: Late Victorian, Late 19th and 20th Century Revivals
- NRHP reference No.: 15000094
- Added to NRHP: March 17, 2015

St. Mary's Episcopal Church is a parish of the Episcopal Church located at Springfield Center, Otsego County, New York, in the Diocese of Albany. It is known for its historic church, built in 1889, and moved to its present site in 1902.

== History ==
Episcopal worship in the area began in the spring of 1875, when the Rev. E. Folsom Baker, rector of St. Paul’s Church in East Springfield, began holding occasional services. An official mission in Springfield Center was not established until 1889, and the cornerstone for the new church was laid on September 21. The congregation was elevated to a full parish in 1899.

== Architecture ==
The complex also includes the parish hall, the rectory, and the wagon shed. The fin-de-siècle church building exhibits an unusual combination of Shingle and Gothic Revival styles and designed to evoke the feel of a medieval English chapel. The rectory was built in 1902, and is a two-story, Queen Anne style frame dwelling with a one-story wraparound porch. The parish hall was built in 1910–1911, and is a two-story, Gothic Revival style stuccoed and shingled building that complements the church. The group was added to the National Register of Historic Places in 2015 as St. Mary's Episcopal Church Complex.
