= Allen Lake (New York) =

Lake in Otsego County, New York

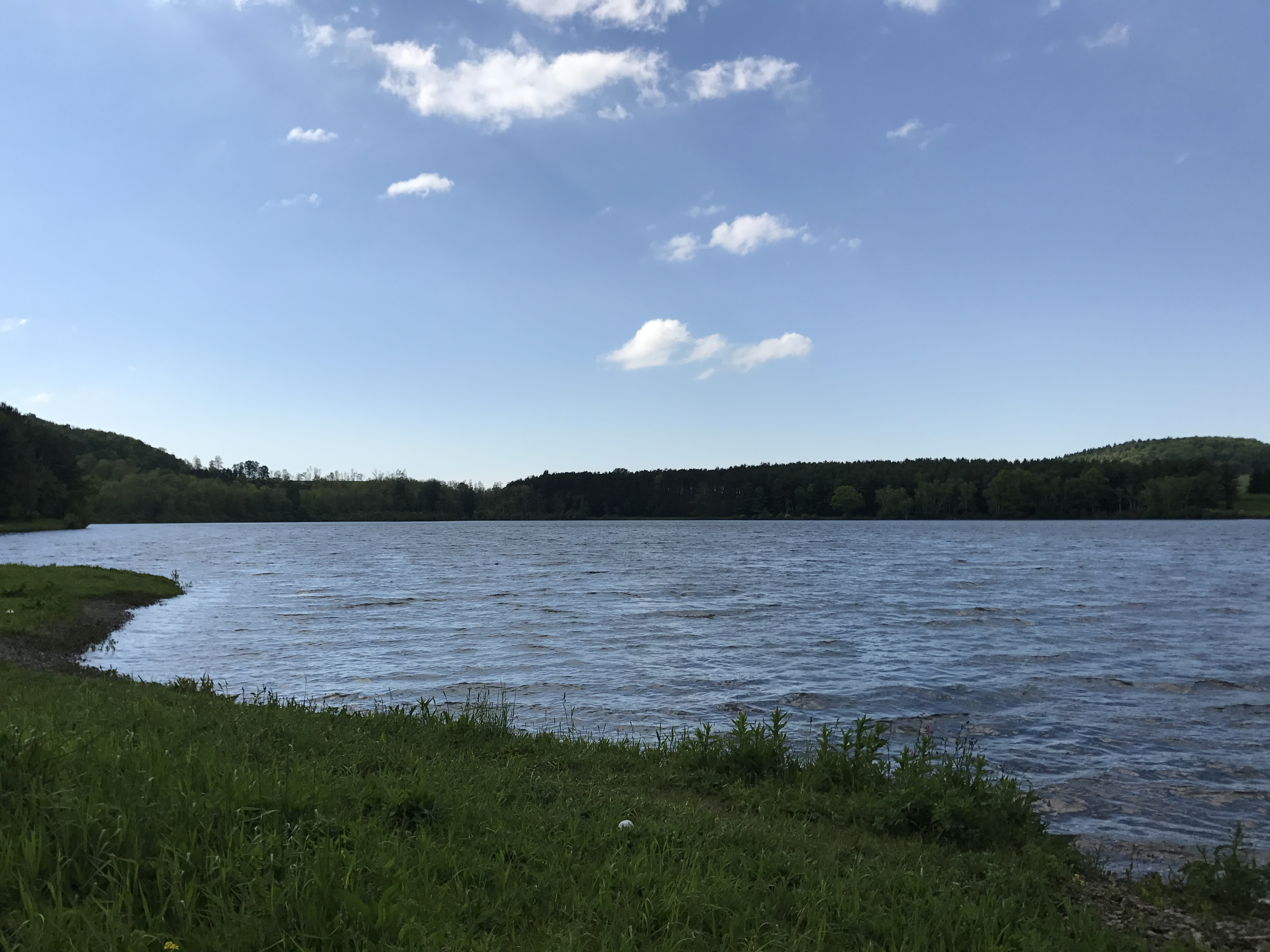

- Location within New York Allen Lake (the United States)
- Location: SE of Richfield Springs, New York
- Coordinates: 42°49′47″N 74°57′06″W
- Type: Lake
- Primary outflows: Trout Brook, Richfield water supply intake line
- Catchment area: 1.03 square miles (2.7 km^{2})
- Surface area: 60 acres (0.094 mi^{2})
- Surface elevation: 1,640 feet (500 m)

Allen Lake is a lake located southeast of the Village of Richfield Springs in northern Otsego County, New York. It is a natural lake, but a low earthen dam and concrete spillway were installed to raise the lake level. The main outflow is Trout Brook, also known as White Creek, which flows into Otsego Lake. Allen Lake is the water supply for Richfield Springs.

== History ==
By 1820, fresh water was being shipped in to the Village of Richfield Springs from Weatherby Pond to the north. As the village grew, it required a steadier supply of fresh water. At first water came from the two holding reservoirs along US Route 20 east of Richfield Springs. This was still not enough water, and Allen Lake was purchased by the village. At first a steam pump pumped the water above ground but later it was buried and tunnelled through the divide so it could be gravity fed. Most of the main cast iron transmission line from the old steam pump location to the village was installed in 1880, with the exception of the roughly 1,690-foot-long (520 m) section that was tunnelled through the divide in the 1920s, so that it could be gravity fed. The tunnelled portion ranges from 20-to-90-foot-deep (6.1 to 27.4 m). The current intake was built in the 1970s, and is composed of a 12 inches (30 cm) diameter cast iron pipe that is run from the old steam pump location on the eastern shore, where the main pipe exits the lake, out into the lake roughly 100 feet (30 m) to the intake structure that extends upward 3 feet (0.91 m) from the lake bottom. In 1994, when the present water plant was built, pumps were added, although it could still be gravity fed.

== Lower reservoirs ==
There are two small reservoirs located directly east of the village along US 20. The upper reservoir, at an elevation of 1,494 feet (455 m), is used to hold most of the water coming through the pipe from Allen Lake. It is kept full by throttling a manual valve on a branch line coming off the main line from Allen Lake. The water travels through the aerial fountain on the upper reservoir to aerate the raw water. The lower reservoir which is seldom used, at an elevation of 1,491 feet (454 m), is kept full by an uncontrolled overflow pipe from the upper reservoir.
