= Waiontha Mountain =

Mountain in New York, United States

- Location within New York Location within the United States

Highest point
- Elevation: 1,972 feet (601 m)
- Coordinates: 42°50′32″N 74°56′58″W

Geography
- Location: SE of Richfield Springs, New York, U.S.
- Topo map: USGS Richfield Springs

Waiontha Mountain is a small mountain chain in the Central New York Region of New York. It is made of two main elevations the tallest being 1,972 feet (601 m). It is located in the Town of Springfield, east of Richfield Springs and north of Allen Lake. Wilders Hill is located northwest of Waiontha Mountain. Several lakes are at the base of the mountain.
