= Crippler =

Crippler or Cripplers may refer to:

- Any disease such as Poliomyelitis with a disabling effect
- cripplers, small bore guns excluded from grouse shooting
- Horse crippler cactus, Homalocephala texensis
- Crippler (character), a fictional character in Marvel Comics
- The Crippler, nickname of professional wrestler Chris Benoit
- The Crippler, nickname of professional wrestler Ray Stevens
- The Crippler, nickname of mixed martial artist Chris Leben
- Cripplers (EP), by the hardcore punk band This Is Hell.
- Cripplers, a possible etymology of the Crips street gang
