= Cripple Creek (Colorado) =

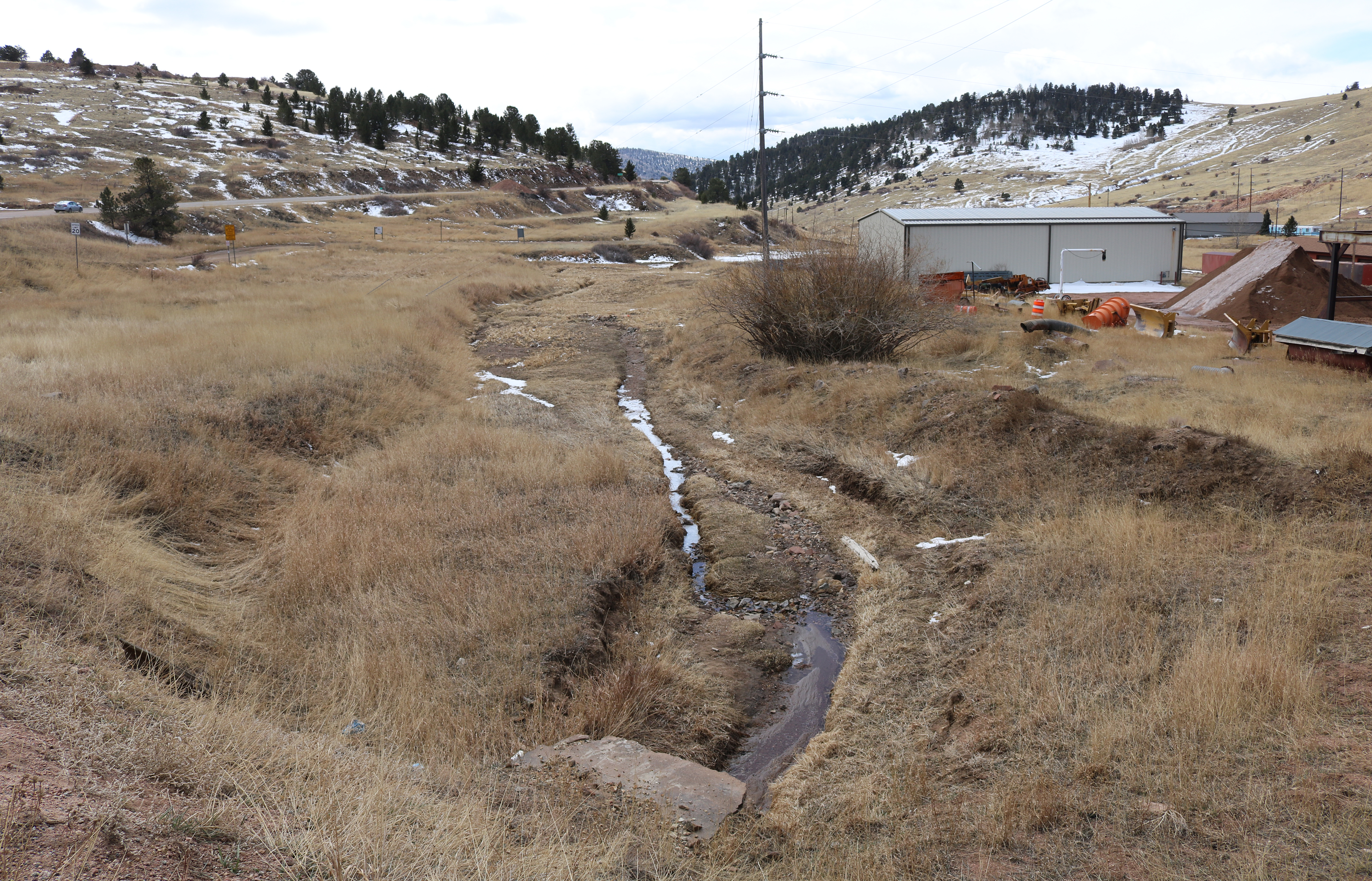
- The creek flowing south from Cripple Creek

Physical characteristics
- Mouth
  - location: Confluence with Fourmile Creek
  - coordinates: 38.6664°N 105.2286°W
  - elevation: 6,845 ft (2,086 m)

Basin features
- Progression: Fourmile Creek—Arkansas—Mississippi

Cripple Creek is a stream in the U.S. state of Colorado.

Cripple Creek was named for the fact livestock frequently became injured crossing the stream.

It passes through the city limits of Cripple Creek, Colorado, although portions of the original creekbed are no longer visible due to construction of casinos and parking lots.

It receives the outflow of the Roosevelt Tunnel, a drainage tunnel that lowered the water table by 1,500 feet throughout the Cripple Creek gold mining district.

== See also ==
- List of rivers of Colorado
