= Warren (hamlet), New York =

Hamlet in Herkimer County, New York, US

Warren, New York
- Hamlet
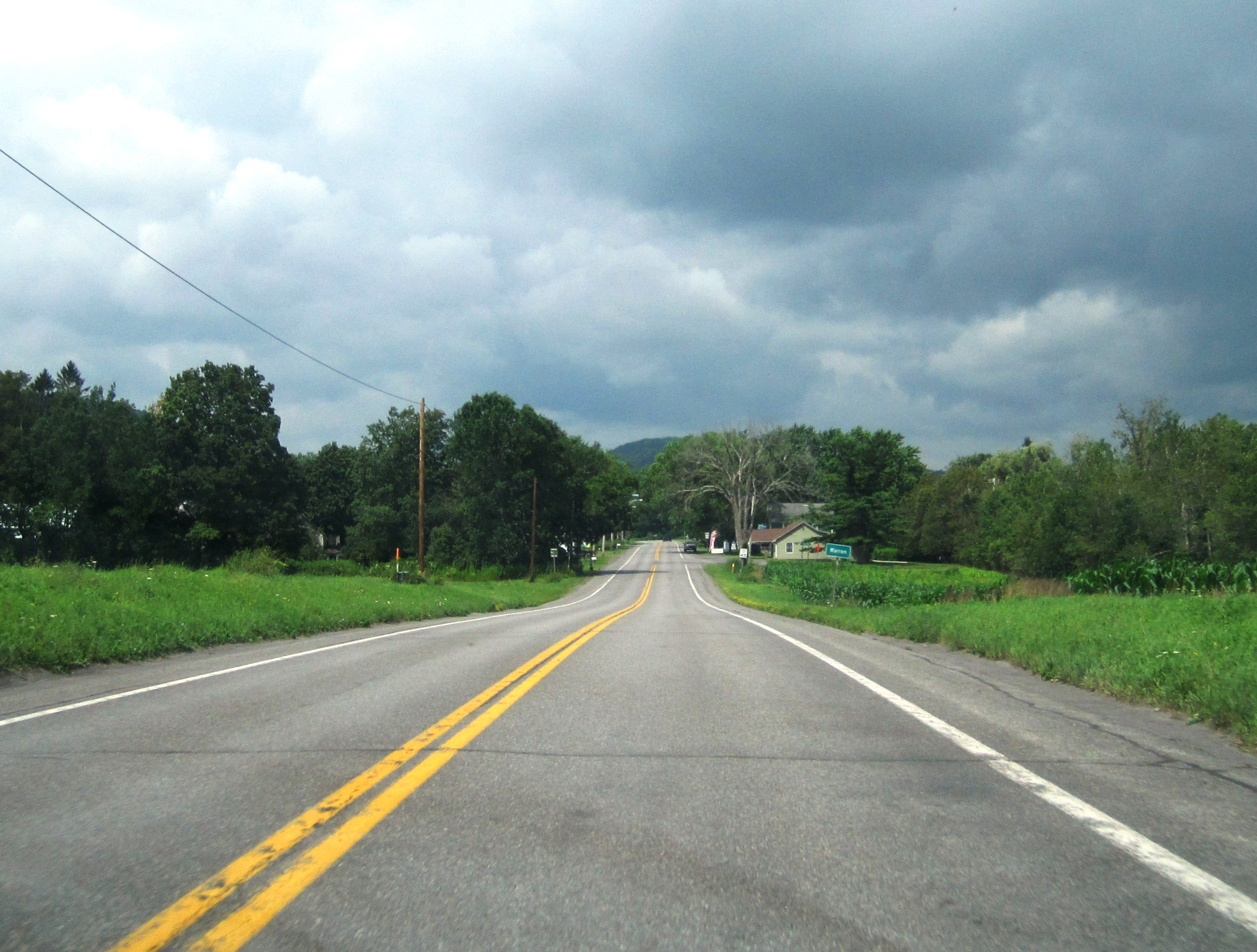
- Entering hamlet of Warren along US 20 westbound

- Location within New York Location within the United States
- Coordinates: 42°50′50″N 74°55′16″W
- Country: United States
- State: New York
- County: Herkimer
- Town: Warren
- Elevation: 1,371 ft (418 m)
- Time zone: UTC-5 (Eastern (EST))
  - Summer (DST): UTC-4 (EDT)
- ZIP code: 13439
- Area code: 315

Warren, previously called Little Lakes, is a hamlet located east of Richfield Springs, on US 20 in Herkimer County, New York, United States. The hamlet is in the town of Warren.
