= Cripple Creek (Virginia) =

Coordinates: 36°51′22.44″N 80°56′21.29″W

Location
- Country: United States

Physical characteristics
- Source
  - location: Virginia

Basin features
- River system: New River

Cripple Creek is a river in Virginia, United States.

== See also ==
- List of rivers of Virginia
