= Springfield Center, New York =

- Hamlet and CDP
- Location within New York
- Coordinates: 42°49′44″N 74°52′36″W
- Country: United States
- State: New York
- County: Otsego
- Town: Springfield

Area
  - Total: 4.82 sq mi (12.49 km^{2})
  - Land: 4.81 sq mi (12.47 km^{2})
  - Water: 0.0077 sq mi (0.02 km^{2})
- Elevation: 1,260 ft (380 m)
- Time zone: UTC-5 (Eastern (EST))
  - Summer (DST): UTC-4 (EDT)
- ZIP code: 13468
- Area code: 607
- GNIS feature ID: 966098

Springfield Center is a hamlet (and census-designated place) in the town of Springfield, Otsego County, New York, United States. As of the 2020 census, Springfield Center had a population of 336. Springfield Center is located on New York State Route 80, 9.2 miles (14.8 km) north-northeast of the Village of Cooperstown. Springfield Center has a post office with ZIP code 13468, which opened on July 16, 1850.

The Springfield Center Elementary School was listed on the National Register of Historic Places in 2011, the St. Mary's Episcopal Church Complex in 2015, and the Warren Ferris House in 2016.
