= Cripple Creek (East Fork Stones River tributary) =

Stream in Tennessee, U.S.

Coordinates: 35°52′50″N 86°15′51″W

Cripple Creek is a stream in the U.S. state of Tennessee. It is a tributary of East Fork Stones River.

Cripple Creek was named after a pioneer incident in which a man was injured crossing the stream.

== See also ==
- List of rivers of Tennessee
