= New York State Route 10 =

Highway in New York

New York State Route 10
- NY 10 highlighted in red, and NY 10A highlighted in blue

Route information
- Maintained by NYSDOT and the village of Canajoharie
- Length: 155.27 mi (249.88 km)
- Existed: 1924–present

Major junctions
- South end: Future I-86 / NY 8 / NY 17 in Deposit
- NY 8 in Deposit; NY 28 in Delhi; NY 23 in Stamford; I-88 / NY 7 in Richmondville; US 20 in Sharon Springs; NY 5 in Palatine Bridge
- North end: NY 8 in Arietta

Location
- Country: United States
- State: New York
- Counties: Delaware, Schoharie, Montgomery, Fulton, Hamilton

Highway system
- New York Highways; Interstate; US; State; Reference; Parkways
← NY 9X	→ US 11

New York State Route 10 (NY 10) is a north–south state highway in the Central New York and North Country regions of New York in the United States. It extends for 155 miles (249 km) from the Quickway (NY 17) (Future Interstate 86) in Deposit, Delaware County to NY 8 at Higgins Bay, a hamlet in the Hamilton County town of Arietta. NY 10 begins concurrent with NY 8. While NY 8 follows a more westerly alignment between Deposit and Higgins Bay via Utica, NY 10 veers to the east, serving Delhi, Cobleskill, and Canajoharie. Along the way, the road intersects Interstate 88 (I-88) near Cobleskill and U.S. Route 20 (US 20) in Sharon Springs.

NY 10 was assigned in 1924; however, it initially followed a completely different alignment than it does today. At the time, it began at the New Jersey state line in Rockland County and followed modern US 9W north to Albany. From here, it continued to Saranac Lake via Schenectady, Saratoga Springs, Lake George, Chestertown, North Creek, Long Lake, and Tupper Lake. It was extended northeast to Plattsburgh by 1926 but truncated to Schenectady in 1927. In the 1930 renumbering of state highways in New York, all of NY 10 south of Long Lake and north of Lake Clear Junction was moved onto a new, more westerly alignment through the state. The route was cut back to its current northern terminus in Arietta c. 1960.

== Route description ==
=== Southern Tier ===
NY 10 begins concurrent with NY 8 at an interchange with the Quickway (NY 17) (future I-86) southeast of the village of Deposit near the Broome-Delaware County line. The two routes continue north along the eastern extents of Deposit to the banks of the west branch of the Delaware River, where NY 8 breaks from NY 10 to cross over the river. NY 10, however, continues northeast along the riverbank, passing south of the Cannonsville Dam and the resulting Cannonsville Reservoir behind it. Near the midpoint of the water body, NY 10 crosses over the reservoir on the Cannonsville Bridge and proceeds to follow the northern edge of the reservoir. As the reservoir begins to narrow, NY 10 intersects NY 268, a connector route leading south to the village of Hancock.

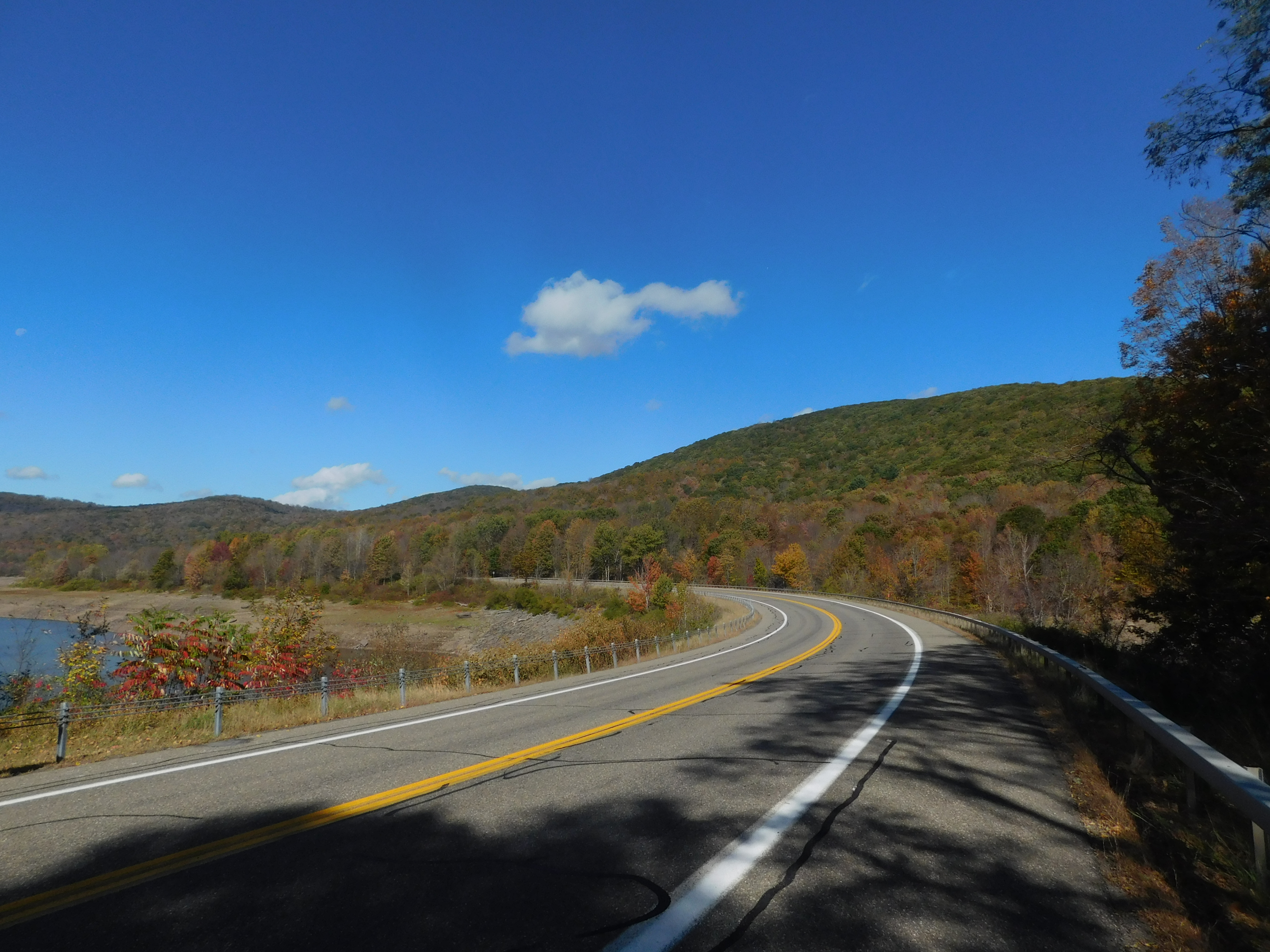
NY 10 southbound at Dryden Brook in the town of Tompkins

Past the end of the reservoir, NY 10 continues northeast in the vicinity of the Delaware River to Walton, a village located directly on the banks of the river. Within the village limits, NY 10 overlaps NY 206 along Delaware Street before separating from the route and proceeding east out of the village. NY 10 remains alongside the Delaware as it continues northeast to Delhi, the home of the State University of New York at Delhi. After passing along the eastern edge of the campus, NY 10 intersects and briefly overlaps NY 28 through the village center before quietly leaving the area.

14 miles (23 km) northeast of Delhi in northeastern Delaware County, NY 10 passes through both Hobart and Stamford, a pair of villages located on the northernmost few miles of the Delaware's west branch. In the latter, NY 10 meets NY 23. North of Stamford in Schoharie County, NY 10 turns northeast, bypassing the 2,900-foot (880 m) tall Mine Hill, home to the source of the west branch of the Delaware. At the northern edge of the hill, NY 10 curves back to the northwest to serve the Jefferson hamlet of the same name.

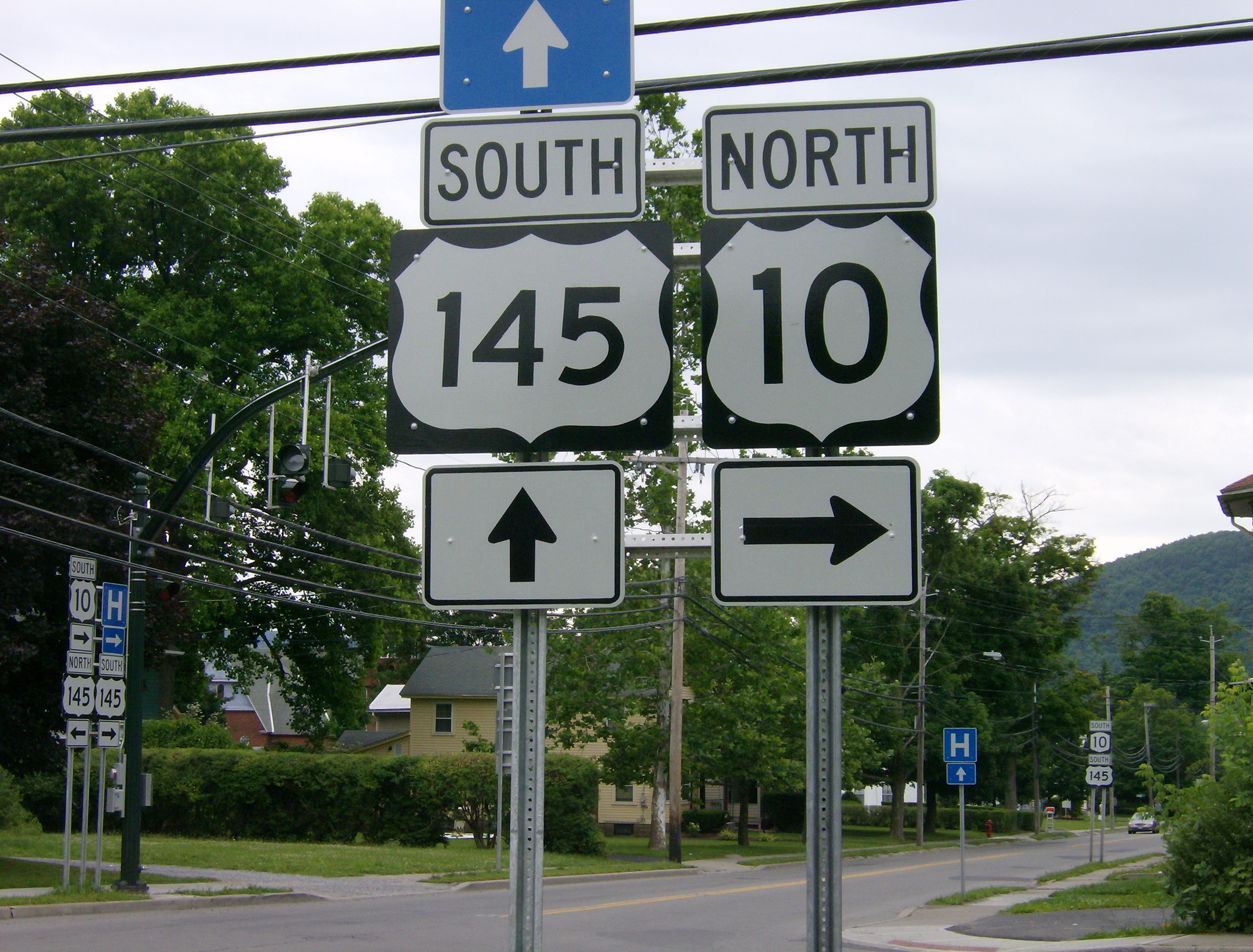
Erroneous U.S. Route shields at the north end of NY 10's overlap with NY 145 in Cobleskill

Outside of Jefferson, NY 10 continues onward through rural Schoharie County, passing through only small roadside hamlets before entering the village of Richmondville, a community situated on NY 7 and the Cobleskill Creek. NY 10 bypasses the village to the southeast, however, and intersects both NY 7 and I-88, the limited-access highway that parallels much of NY 7, east of the village center. NY 10 turns east, overlapping NY 7 through the State University of New York at Cobleskill campus and into Cobleskill, where NY 7 and NY 10 intersect NY 145 at Grand Street. Here, NY 10, as well as NY 145 (which is concurrent with NY 7 east of this point), leave NY 7 and continue north for two blocks before NY 10 leaves NY 145 and heads west out of the village on Elm Street.

Between Cobleskill and Sharon Springs, NY 10 proceeds northwest through rural terrain once more, with the points of interest limited to a small number of hamlets. Midway between the two locations in Seward, NY 10 intersects NY 165, a connector leading to Cooperstown via NY 166 and Otsego County's County Route 52 (CR 52). In Sharon Springs, a village situated in northwest Schoharie County, NY 10 intersects US 20. Shortly after exiting the village, NY 10 passes into Montgomery County.

=== Montgomery, Fulton and Hamilton Counties ===
Just across the county line, NY 10 passes through the village of Ames, a small community situated south of Canajoharie Creek at the junction of NY 10, CR 88 and CR 89. NY 10 crosses over the creek shortly afterward and follows the waterway downhill. Upon entering the village of Canajoharie, NY 10 uses Reed Street, Walnut Street, and Rock Street which form a switchback to ease the descent before entering a valley containing the conjoined Mohawk River and Erie Canal and the New York State Thruway (I-90).

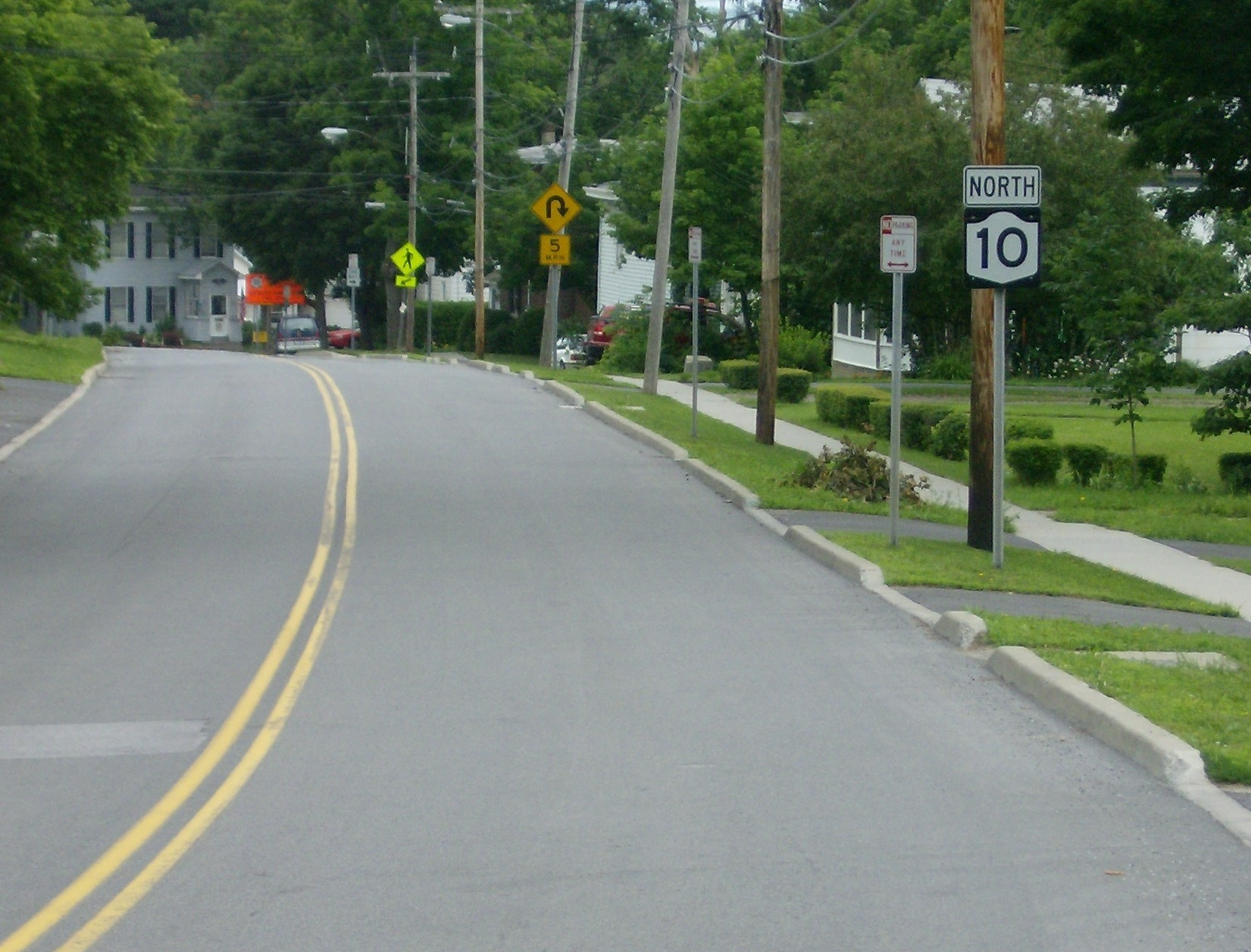
In Canajoharie, NY 10 descends a steep elevation using streets to form a switchback

Downtown, maintenance of NY 10 shifts from the New York State Department of Transportation (NYSDOT) to the village at Mohawk Street. The highway remains locally owned for three blocks to Incinerator Road, where the route becomes state-maintained once more. During this stretch, NY 10 intersects NY 5S at Main Street. North of Incinerator Road, the route passes under the Thruway before crossing into the neighboring village of Palatine Bridge at the midpoint of the Mohawk River. On the northern riverbank, NY 10 meets NY 5 and overlaps the route westward for a block before continuing northward into the largely rural town of Palatine.

6.0 miles (9.7 km) from Palatine Bridge, NY 10 passes into the Fulton County town of Ephratah and intersects NY 67 just inside the county line. NY 67 turns north, joining NY 10 to the community of Ephratah, where it splits from NY 10 and heads east to Johnstown. NY 10, however, continues northward in the vicinity of Caroga Creek to an intersection with NY 29 near the hamlet of Garoga. The two routes join for roughly 1.5 miles (2.4 km) before separating as the roadway crosses over the Blue Line into Adirondack Park.

==== Adirondack Park ====
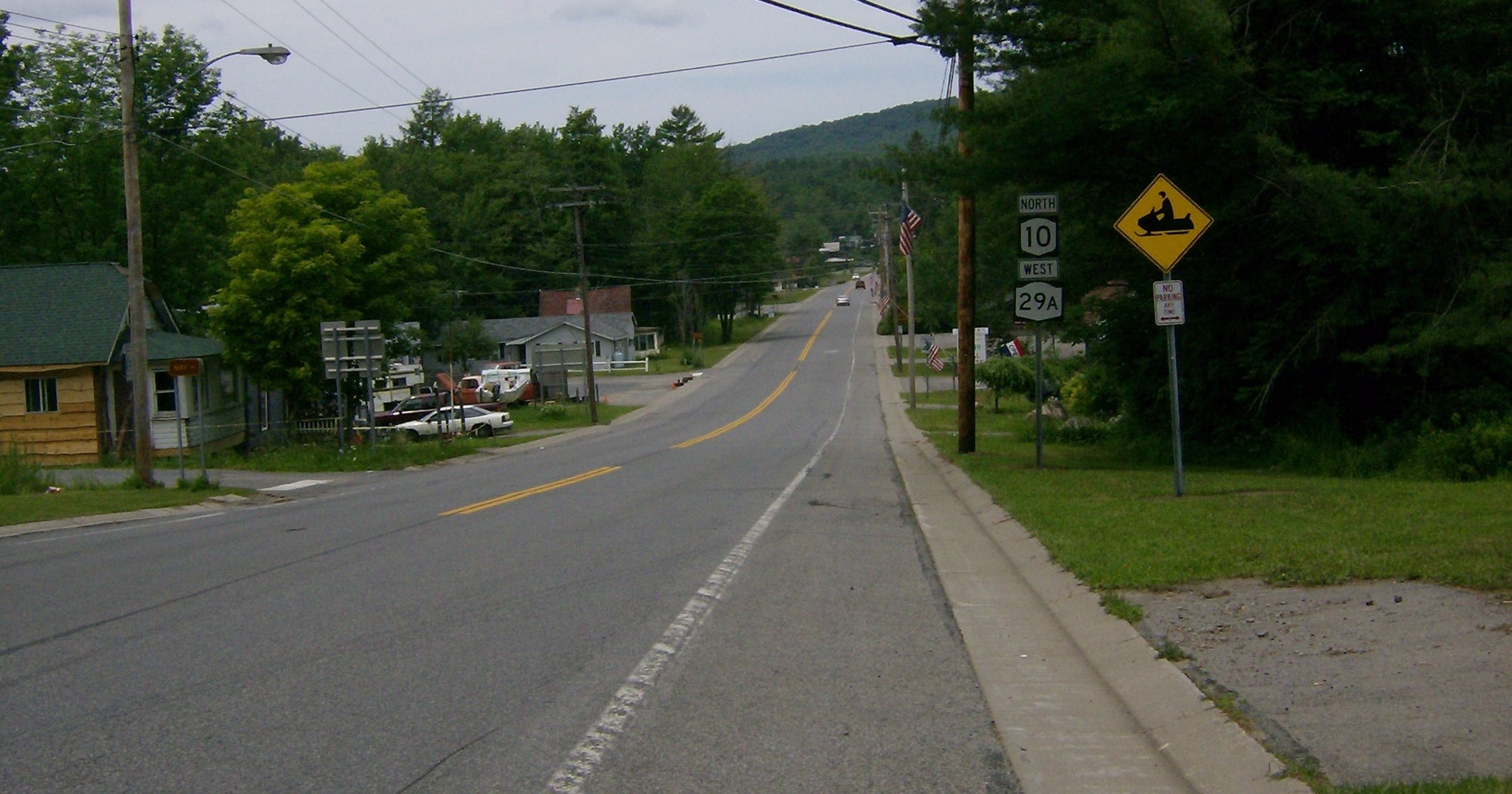
NY 10 overlaps NY 29A passing through Caroga Lake

North of Rockwood, the community centered around the northern split of the overlap between NY 10 and NY 29, NY 10 intersects NY 10A, an alternate route around Rockwood Lake to the east. Farther north, NY 10 enters Caroga Lake, a community situated on the eastern edges of West and East Caroga lakes. In the center of the hamlet, NY 10 meets NY 29A and follows the route out of the area. Together, NY 10 and NY 29A head northward through a region dotted with small lakes, as well as the larger Canada Lake, before splitting in the vicinity of Pine Lake.

Farther north, NY 10 passes directly between the Stoner Lakes, a pair of small water bodies separated by only NY 10, just south of where it crosses into Hamilton County. For most of its run through the county, NY 10 parallels a waterbody, namely the west branch of the Sacandaga River to where the Piseco Outlet flows into it, then the Piseco Outlet north to Big Bay near the community of Higgins Bay. NY 10 terminates soon after at an intersection with NY 8 south of Piseco Lake, west of Spy Lake, and southwest of Higgins Bay.

== History ==
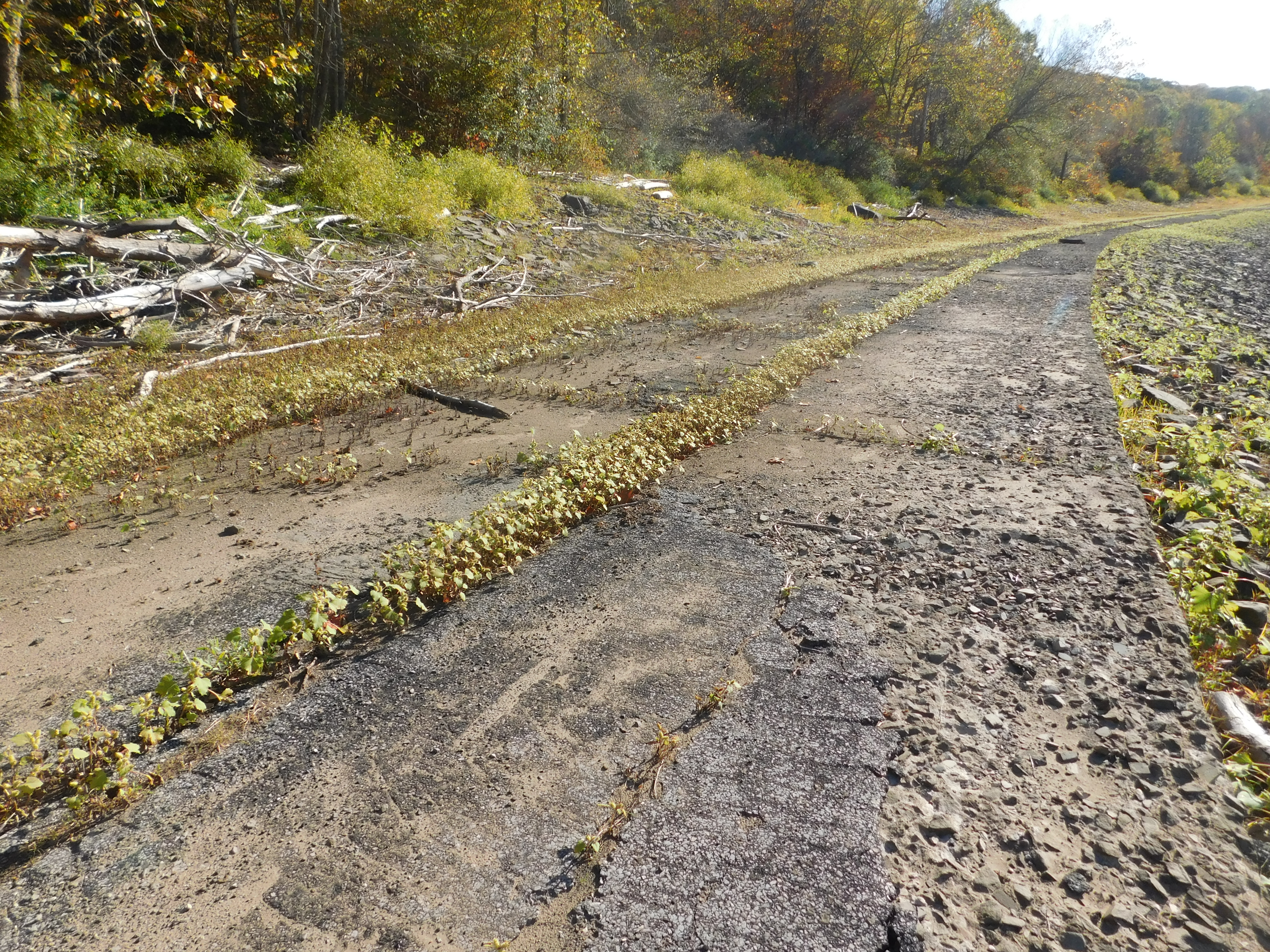
The original alignment of NY 10 in Tompkins normally covered by the waters of the Cannonsville Reservoir

In 1908, the New York State Legislature designated the primary north–south roadway along the west bank of the Hudson River from the New Jersey state line near New York City to Albany, now largely US 9W, as Route 3, an unsigned legislative route. When the first set of posted routes in New York were assigned in 1924, all of legislative Route 3 became part of the new NY 10, which initially began at the New Jersey state line and ended in Saranac Lake. North of Albany, the route followed modern NY 5, NY 50, and NY 9N through Schenectady and Saratoga Springs to reach the North Country at Lake George. Past this point, NY 10 continued north on what is now US 9, NY 8, NY 28, NY 28N, and NY 30 to Tupper Lake via Chestertown, Wevertown, North Creek, and Long Lake. At Tupper Lake, the route headed east on current NY 3 to Wawbeek before taking a more circuitous route to Saranac Lake by way of modern NY 30, NY 186, and NY 86.

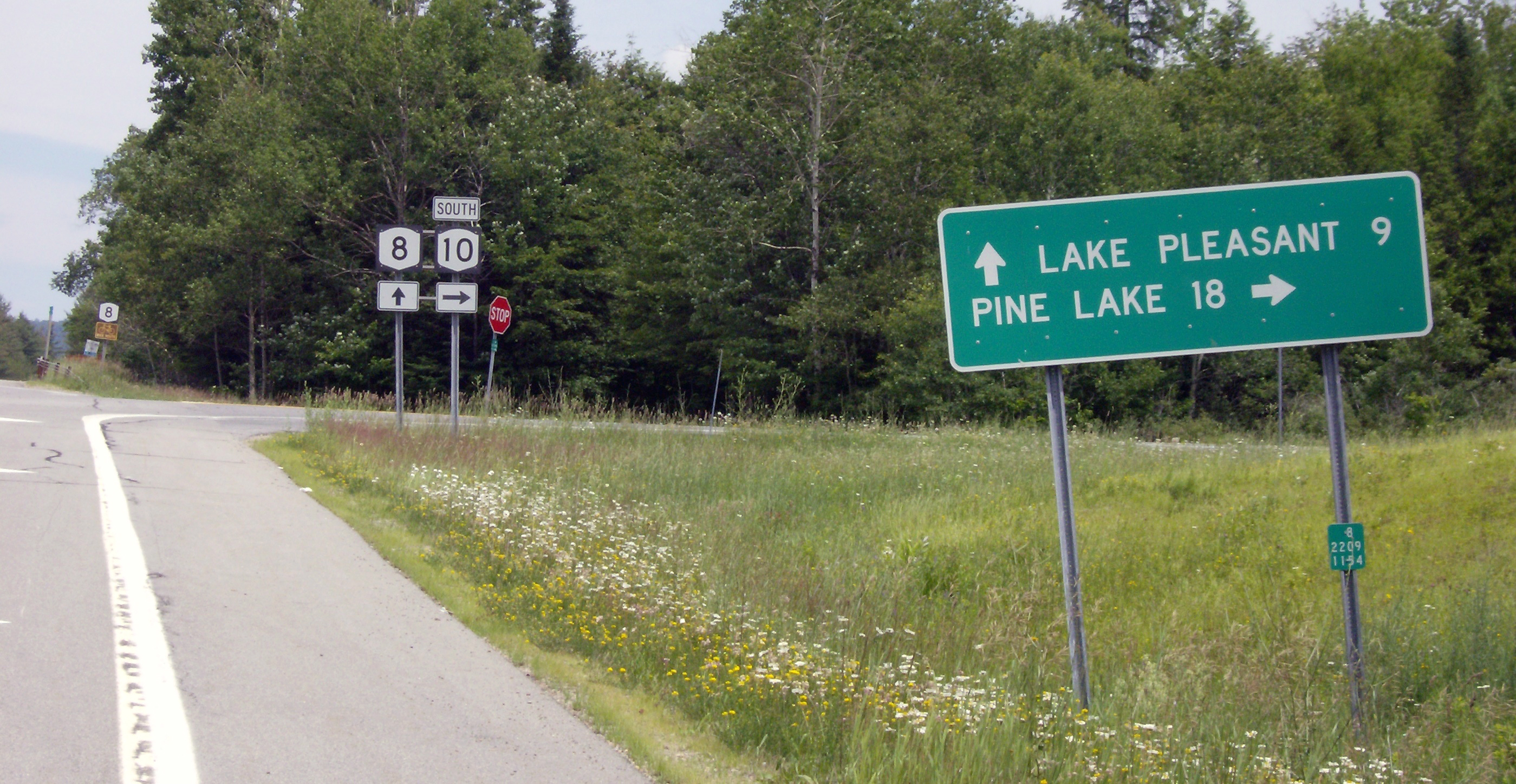
NY 8 at the current northern terminus of NY 10 in Arietta

The first change to the routing of NY 10 came by 1926 when NY 10 was extended northeastward over modern NY 3 to Plattsburgh, where it terminated at NY 30 (now NY 22). The route was truncated one year later when US 9W was assigned to the portion of NY 10 between New Jersey and Albany. NY 10 was subsequently truncated to the former western terminus of its overlap with NY 5 in Schenectady. In the 1930 renumbering of state highways in New York, NY 10 was significantly reconfigured to begin in Deposit and end at the Canadian border north of Malone. The only segment of NY 10 not altered by the realignment, which utilized a combination of previously numbered routes and unsigned roadways, was the piece between Long Lake and Lake Clear Junction.

From Deposit to Stamford, NY 10 supplanted NY 51, a highway assigned in the mid-1920s. Farther north, the portion from Palatine Bridge to Indian Lake was originally part of NY 80, a route created in the late 1920s. Past Indian Lake, NY 10 followed what had been part of NY 10A to Long Lake, where it connected to its pre-1930 alignment. The section of modern NY 10 between Stamford and Palatine Bridge was previously unnumbered. North of Lake Clear Junction, the route followed the pre-1930 routing of NY 3 from Paul Smiths to Malone and two previously unnumbered highways between Lake Clear Junction and Paul Smiths and from Malone to the Canadian border. NY 10 was truncated to its current northern terminus in Arietta and largely replaced with NY 30 north of Speculator c. 1960.

== Major intersections ==
County	Location	mi	km	Destinations	Notes
Delaware	Town of Deposit	0.00	0.00	Future I-86 / NY 17 – New York City, Binghamton NY 8 begins	Southern terminus; southern terminus of NY 8; diamond interchange; exit 84 on NY 17
Delaware	Town of Deposit	2.14	3.44	NY 8 north – Oquaga Creek State Park, Sidney	North end of NY 8 overlap; hamlet of Stilesville
Delaware	Tompkins	15.69	25.25	NY 268 south – Hancock	Northern terminus of NY 268
Delaware	Village of Walton	26.71	42.99	NY 206 west – Bainbridge	South end of NY 206 overlap
Delaware	Village of Walton	27.20	43.77	NY 206 east – Fairgrounds, Downsville	North end of NY 206 overlap
Delaware	Village of Delhi	43.75	70.41	NY 28 south (Kingston Street) – Andes	South end of NY 28 overlap
Delaware	Village of Delhi	44.03	70.86	NY 28 north (Meredith Street) – Oneonta	North end of NY 28 overlap
Delaware	Village of Stamford	64.01	103.01	NY 23 – Oneonta, Grand Gorge	
Schoharie	Town of Richmondville	84.17	135.46	I-88 / NY 7 west – Cobleskill, Albany, Binghamton, Richmondville	South end of NY 7 overlap; exit 20 on I-88
Schoharie	Town of Richmondville	86.70	139.53	To I-88 – Oneonta, Binghamton, Albany	Access via NY 992L
Schoharie	Village of Cobleskill	88.67	142.70	NY 7 east / NY 145 south (East Main Street)	North end of NY 7 overlap; south end of NY 145 overlap
Schoharie	Village of Cobleskill	88.89	143.05	NY 145 north (North Grand Street)	North end of NY 145 overlap
Schoharie	Seward	95.92	154.37	NY 165 west – Seward, Roseboom	Eastern terminus of NY 165
Schoharie	Sharon Springs	102.11	164.33	US 20 – Cherry Valley, Sharon	
Montgomery	Town of Canajoharie	108.35	174.37	NY 163 west – Sprout Brook	Eastern terminus of NY 163
Montgomery	Village of Canajoharie	112.75	181.45	NY 5S to I-90 / New York Thruway	
Montgomery	Palatine Bridge	113.08	181.98	NY 5 east – Fonda	South end of NY 5 overlap
Montgomery	Palatine Bridge	113.25	182.26	NY 5 west – Nelliston	North end of NY 5 overlap
Fulton	Ephratah	119.84	192.86	NY 67 west	South end of NY 67 overlap
Fulton	Ephratah	121.47	195.49	NY 67 east – Johnstown	North end of NY 67 overlap; hamlet of Ephratah
Fulton	Ephratah	124.52	200.40	NY 29 west – Dolgeville, Salisbury, Middleville	South end of NY 29 overlap
Fulton	Ephratah	125.78	202.42	NY 29 east – Johnstown	North end of NY 29 overlap; hamlet of Rockwood
Fulton	Town of Caroga	127.40	205.03	NY 10A south – Johnstown	Northern terminus of NY 10A
Fulton	Town of Caroga	132.31	212.93	NY 29A east – Gloversville	South end of NY 29A overlap; hamlet of Caroga Lake
Fulton	Town of Caroga	132.44	213.14	CR 112 – Bleecker, Benson, Northville, Mayfield, Edinburg, Corinth, Hadley, Lake Luzerne, Lake George	
Fulton	Town of Caroga	137.66	221.54	NY 29A west – Stratford, Salisbury, Middleville	North end of NY 29A overlap
Hamilton	Arietta	155.27	249.88	NY 8 (Southern Adirondack Trail) – Poland, Lake Pleasant	Northern terminus
1.000 mi = 1.609 km; 1.000 km = 0.621 mi: Concurrency terminus

== NY 10A ==
New York State Route 10A
- Location: Johnstown–Caroga
- Length: 2.41 mi (3.88 km)
- Existed: c. 1931–present

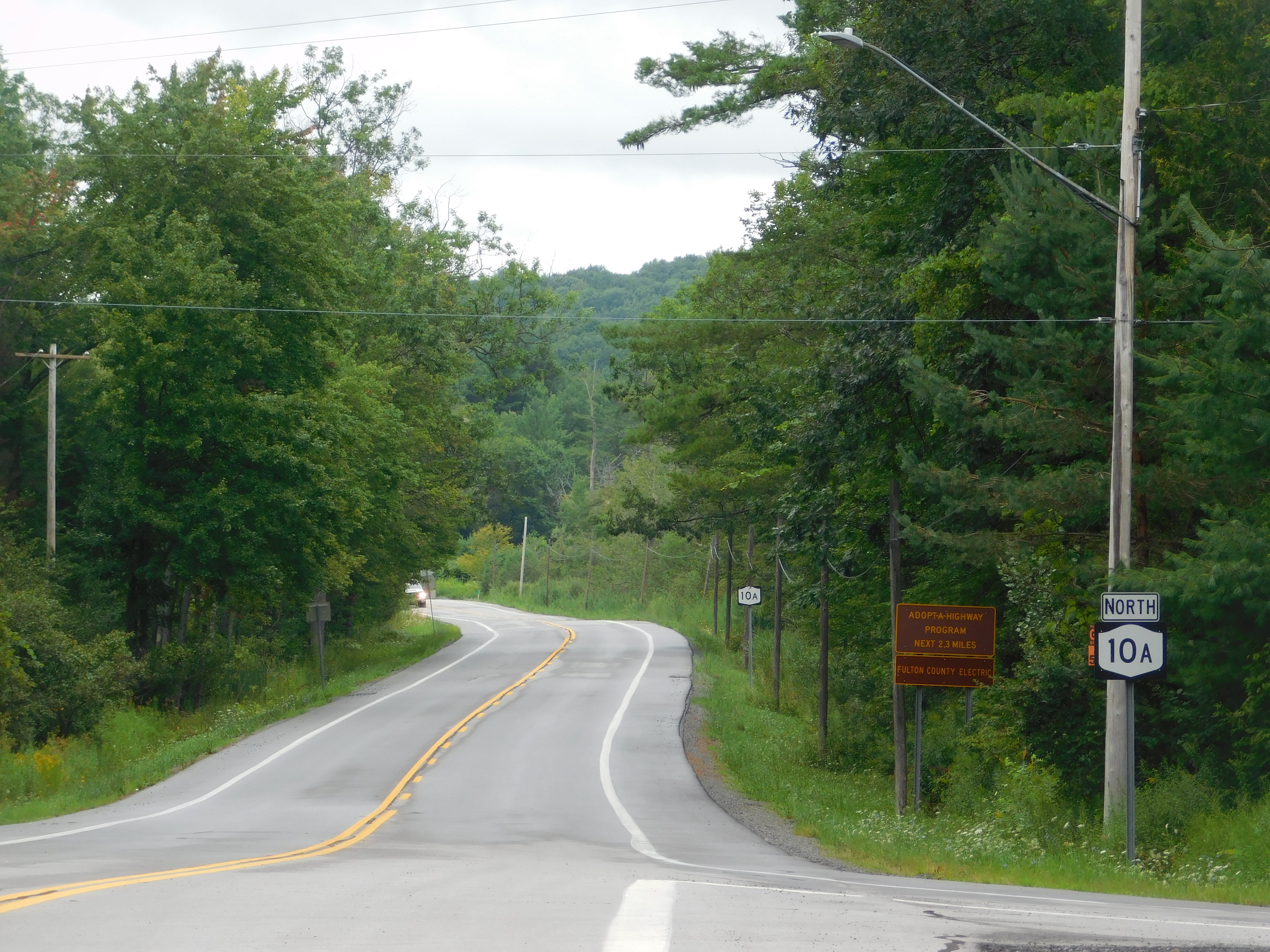
NY 10A from NY 29 in Johnstown

There are two highways that have been designated NY 10A.

- The original NY 10A was an alternate route of NY 10 between Long Lake and North Creek. It was assigned in the late 1920s and removed as part of the 1930 renumbering of state highways in New York.
- The current NY 10A is a 2.41-mile-long (3.88 km) two-lane spur providing an alternate connection from NY 29 in Fulton County. The route begins at NY 29 in the Town of Johnstown and heads northwest to end at NY 10 in the Town of Caroga just inside the limits of Adirondack Park. NY 10A serves as a link for motorists wishing to access the western parts of Caroga via NY 10 from NY 29, bypassing the Rockwood hamlet, a reduced speed zone, and about a mile of highway. It was assigned c. 1931.

The entire route is in Fulton County.

Location	mi	km	Destinations	Notes
Town of Johnstown	0.00	0.00	NY 29 – Johnstown, Dolgeville	Southern terminus
Caroga	2.41	3.88	NY 10 – Canajoharie, Dolgeville, Caroga Lake	Northern terminus
1.000 mi = 1.609 km; 1.000 km = 0.621 mi
