= New York State Route 165 =

State highway in eastern New York, US

New York State Route 165
- Map of eastern New York with NY 165 highlighted in red

Route information
- Maintained by NYSDOT
- Length: 12.14 mi (19.54 km)
- Existed: 1930–present

Major junctions
- West end: NY 166 in Roseboom
- East end: NY 10 in Seward

Location
- Country: United States
- State: New York
- Counties: Otsego, Schoharie

Highway system
- New York Highways; Interstate; US; State; Reference; Parkways
← NY 164	→ NY 166

New York State Route 165 (NY 165) is an east–west state highway in eastern New York in the United States. It serves as a connector between NY 166 in the Otsego County town of Roseboom and NY 10 in the Schoharie County town of Seward. NY 165 is a two-lane highway its entire length.

== Route description ==
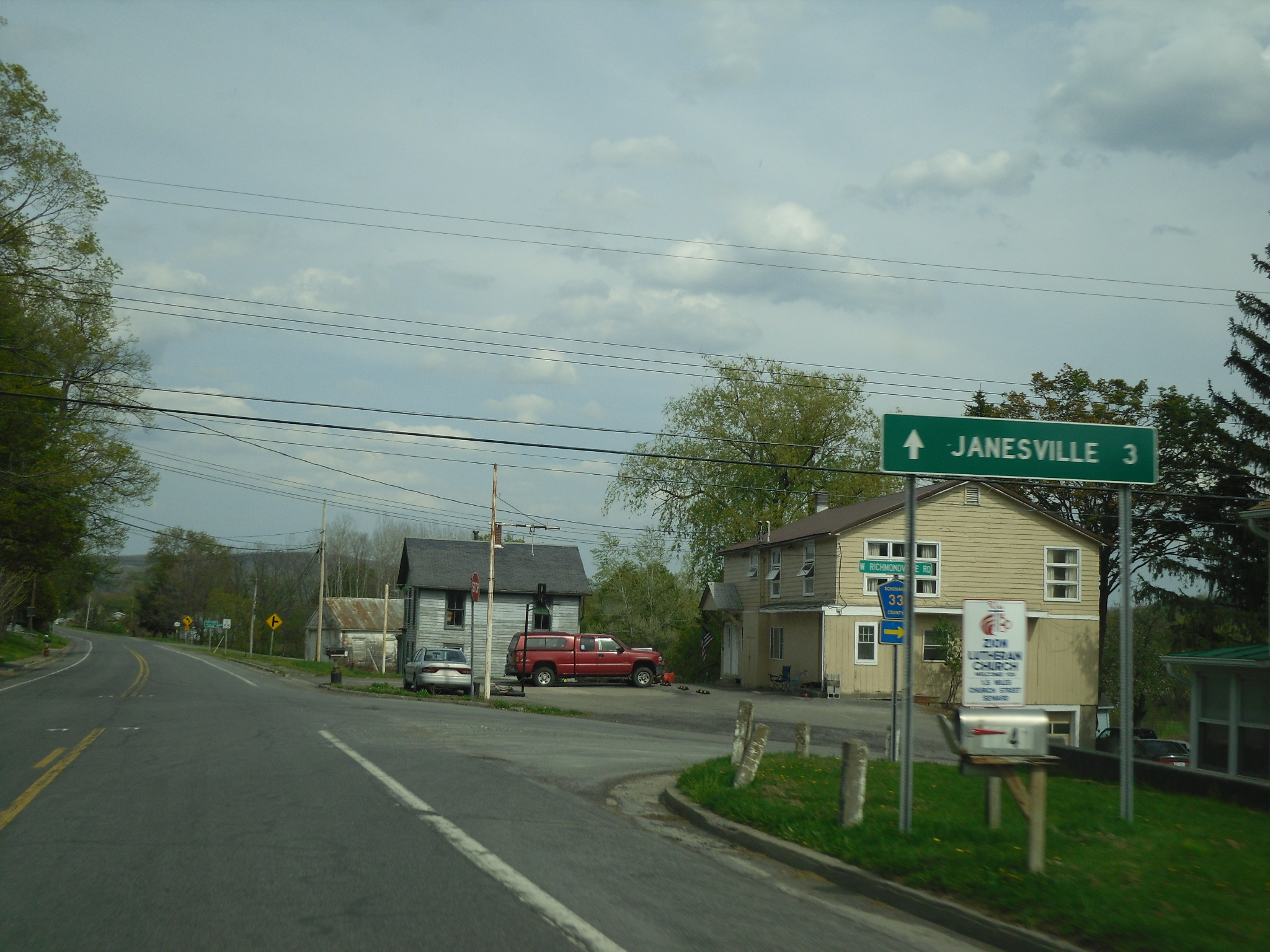
NY 165 eastbound at the junction with CR 33 (West Richmondville Road) in Dorloo

NY 165 begins at an intersection with NY 166 in the hamlet of Roseboom, within the town of the same name. NY 165 crosses through the hamlet for three blocks, passing several homes and south of Roseboom Cemetery. Turning southeast, the route crosses over Cherry Valley Creek through the town of Roseboom, crossing a fork with County Route 57 (CR 57). The two routes parallel southward before CR 57 merges back into NY 165 near Ziefle Road. Bending southeast through Roseboom, NY 165 passes through the rural town as a two-lane road, turning east a junction with Middlefield Road. Running south of Pleasant Brook, NY 165 crosses east through Roseboom, entering the hamlet of Pleasant Brook.

Pleasant Brook is a small hamlet, consisting of a junction with CR 50 (Winne Hollow Road). After Pleasant Brook, NY 165 turns southeast again, crossing through the dense wilderness and paralleling the physical Pleasant Brook. Continuing east through Roseboom, the route enters the hamlet of South Valley, where the route passes north of South Valley Pleasant Brook Cemetery. After the cemetery, the route passes north of CR 34, paralleling the route until they intersect in the center of South Valley. NY 165 through South Valley is a two-lane residential road along the base of Honey Hill. After South Valley, NY 165 continues eastward through the woods along Pleasant Brook, which soon opens into Plank Pond.

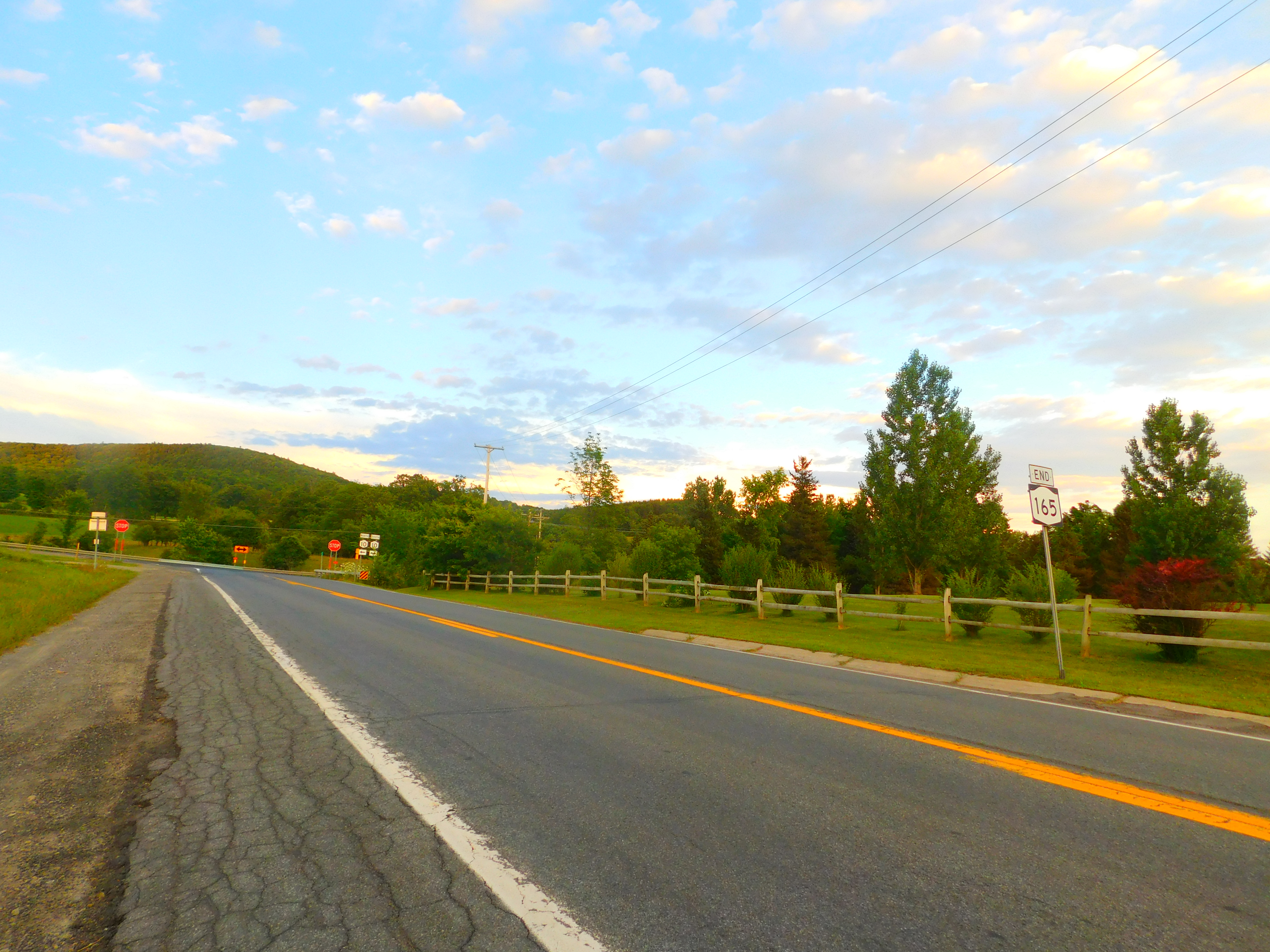
NY 165 westbound in Seward

After Plank Pond, NY 165 continues eastward through Roseboom, passing south of Bliss Pond, where the route turns northeast up another hillside. The route becomes surrounded by dense wilderness, soon making a gradual bend along the hillside down into the hamlet of Weber Corners. In Weber Corners, NY 165 intersects with Bill Marne Road, where the route crosses into Schoharie County from Otsego County. Now in the town of Seward, NY 165 crosses past several residences in Weber Corners before returning to the woods to the east. This reverts near Cemetery Road, where the route continues east past several farms and into the hamlet of Dorloo. In the center of Dorloo, the route intersects with the northern terminus of CR 33 (West Richmondville Road).

After CR 33, NY 165 turns northeast again, leaving Dorloo for the hamlet of Seward. In Seward, NY 165 crosses south of a pond, entering downtown Seward as a two-lane residential street. Toward the eastern end of the hamlet, NY 165 intersects with CR 5 (Slate Hill Road). Bending southeast, the route crosses the western terminus of CR 30 (Gardnersville Road) before bending southeast and east into the hamlet of Janesville. In Janesville, the route intersects with NY 10, marking the eastern terminus of NY 165 northwest of Cobleskill.

== History ==
The entirety of NY 165 was assigned as part of the 1930 renumbering of state highways in New York. In Roseboom, NY 165 was originally routed on modern County Route 57. It was moved onto its current alignment in the mid-1960s.

== Major intersections ==
County	Location	mi	km	Destinations	Notes
Otsego	Roseboom	0.00	0.00	NY 166 – Milford, Cherry Valley	Western terminus
Schoharie	Seward	12.14	19.54	NY 10 – Sharon Springs, Cobleskill	Eastern terminus
1.000 mi = 1.609 km; 1.000 km = 0.621 mi

== See also ==
- List of county routes in Otsego County, New York
