= Richmondville (village), New York =

Richmondville, New York
- Village
- Location within the state of New York
- Coordinates: 42°38′2″N 74°34′0″W
- Country: United States
- State: New York
- County: Schoharie
- Town: Richmondville

Government
  - Type: Mayor/Board of Trustees
  - Mayor: Kevin Neary (D)

Area
  - Total: 1.85 sq mi (4.78 km^{2})
  - Land: 1.85 sq mi (4.78 km^{2})
  - Water: 0 sq mi (0.00 km^{2})
- Elevation: 1,096 ft (334 m)

Population (2020)
  - Total: 858
  - Density: 464.7/sq mi (179.42/km^{2})
- Time zone: UTC-5 (Eastern (EST))
  - Summer (DST): UTC-4 (EDT)
- ZIP code: 12149
- Area code: 518
- FIPS code: 36-61588
- GNIS feature ID: 2391095
- Website: www.richmondvillevillage.org

Richmondville is a village in Schoharie County, New York, United States. The population was 918 at the 2010 census.

The Village of Richmondville is in the center of the Town of Richmondville and is northeast of Oneonta.

== History ==
The early village was the location of many mills and small factories. The village was incorporated in 1881.

The Bunn–Tillapaugh Feed Mill and Richmondville United Methodist Church are listed on the National Register of Historic Places.

== Geography ==
Richmondville is located at 42°38′1″N 74°33′59″W (42.633838, -74.566627).

According to the United States Census Bureau, the village has a total area of 1.8 square miles (4.7 km^{2}), all land.

Interstate 88 passes through the village. State routes 7 (Main Street) and 10, along with County Road 22, intersect in the village.

== Demographics ==
Historical population
Census	Pop.	Note	%±
1870	630		—
1880	653		3.7%
1890	663		1.5%
1900	651		−1.8%
1910	599		−8.0%
1920	581		−3.0%
1930	618		6.4%
1940	598		−3.2%
1950	709		18.6%
1960	743		4.8%
1970	826		11.2%
1980	792		−4.1%
1990	843		6.4%
2000	786		−6.8%
2010	918		16.8%
2020	858		−6.5%
U.S. Decennial Census

As of the census of 2000, there were 786 people, 314 households, and 212 families residing in the village. The population density was 433.4 inhabitants per square mile (167.3/km^{2}). There were 344 housing units at an average density of 189.7 per square mile (73.2/km^{2}). The racial makeup of the village was 95.42% White, 1.15% Black or African American, 1.02% Native American, 0.76% Asian, 1.15% from other races, and 0.51% from two or more races. Hispanic or Latino of any race were 2.04% of the population.

There were 314 households, out of which 34.7% had children under the age of 18 living with them, 49.7% were married couples living together, 13.4% had a female householder with no husband present, and 32.2% were non-families. 26.1% of all households were made up of individuals, and 10.5% had someone living alone who was 65 years of age or older. The average household size was 2.50 and the average family size was 3.00.

In the village, the population was spread out, with 28.9% under the age of 18, 8.1% from 18 to 24, 29.9% from 25 to 44, 19.1% from 45 to 64, and 14.0% who were 65 years of age or older. The median age was 34 years. For every 100 females, there were 97.5 males. For every 100 females age 18 and over, there were 88.9 males.

The median income for a household in the village was $35,714, and the median income for a family was $40,577. Males had a median income of $31,538 versus $25,208 for females. The per capita income for the village was $17,512. About 5.4% of families and 9.0% of the population were below the poverty line, including 7.8% of those under age 18 and 7.3% of those age 65 or over.

== Politics ==
Richmondville has historically been dominated by Republicans. However, in recent decades democrats like Betsy Bernocco (fmr. Town Supervisor) and Kevin Neary (Mayor) have made significant inroads winning elections in both the town and village of Richmondville.

During the 2009 elections on November 3, local Republicans regained control of the Richmondville Town Board, and Supervisor John Barlow (R) defeated his Democratic opponent by one vote. On March 16, 2010 – Village Trustees George Konta and William Lape were re-elected without opposition to the Village Board. John Barlow resigned as Supervisor in late 2010, and was replaced by Richard Lape.

In 2013, Mayor Kevin Neary ran unopposed. In 2011, Mayor Neary faced write-in candidate Timothy Knight. Neary won 106-9 (92-8%).
