= Pleasant Brook, New York =

- Hamlet
- Location within New York Location within the United States
- Coordinates: 42°42′59″N 74°45′49″W
- Country: United States
- State: New York
- County: Otsego
- Town: Roseboom
- Elevation: 1,332 ft (406 m)
- Time zone: UTC-5 (Eastern (EST))
  - Summer (DST): UTC-4 (EDT)
- ZIP code: 13320
- Area code: 607

Pleasant Brook is a hamlet located south of Cherry Valley, at the corner of NY 165 and Middlefield Road in the Town of Roseboom in Otsego County, New York, United States. Pleasant Brook runs west through the hamlet.
