= Snyder Creek (New York) =

- Location of the mouth of Snyder Creek

Location
- Country: United States
- State: New York
- County: Otsego

Physical characteristics
- Source
  - coordinates: 42°46′38″N 74°42′39″W
- Mouth: Pleasant Brook
  - coordinates: 42°43′09″N 74°45′15″W
  - elevation: 1,296 ft (395 m)

Snyder Creek is a river in Otsego County, New York. It converges with Pleasant Brook east-northeast of Pleasant Brook.
