= Middlefield, New York =

- Town
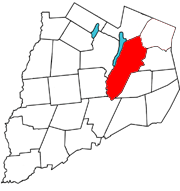
- Otsego County map with the Town of Middlefield in red
- Coordinates: 42°41′18″N 74°52′27″W
- Country: United States
- State: New York
- County: Otsego

Area
  - Total: 63.71 sq mi (165.00 km^{2})
  - Land: 63.33 sq mi (164.03 km^{2})
  - Water: 0.37 sq mi (0.96 km^{2})
- Elevation: 1,709 ft (521 m)

Population (2010)
  - Total: 2,114
  - Estimate (2016): 2,029
  - Density: 32.0/sq mi (12.37/km^{2})
- Time zone: UTC-5 (Eastern (EST))
  - Summer (DST): UTC-4 (EDT)
- FIPS code: 36-46910
- GNIS feature ID: 0979214
- Website: www.middlefieldny.org

Middlefield is a town in Otsego County, New York, United States. The population was 2,114 at the 2010 census.

The Town of Middlefield is in the northeastern part of the county. It is the largest town by area in the county.

== History ==
Settlers from Scotland and Ireland moved into this area around 1755. The first settlements were made near Middlefield village, which was formed from the Town of Cherry Valley in 1797.

The Phoenix cotton mill was started in 1815, but became a wool mill in 1866.

The Middlefield Hamlet Historic District and Benjamin D. North House are listed on the National Register of Historic Places.

== Geography ==
According to the United States Census Bureau, the town has a total area of 65.9 square miles (171 km^{2}), of which 64.4 square miles (167 km^{2}) is land and 1.5 square miles (3.9 km^{2}) (2.32%) is water.

New York State Route 166 follows the course of Cherry Valley Creek through the southern part of the town. Cherry Valley Creek and Red Creek, which drain the town, are tributaries of the Susquehanna River.

The western section of Middlefield borders Otsego Lake.

== Demographics ==
Historical population
| Census | Pop. | Note | %± |
|---|---|---|---|
| 1820 | 2,579 | | — |
| 1830 | 3,323 | | 28.8% |
| 1840 | 3,319 | | −0.1% |
| 1850 | 3,131 | | −5.7% |
| 1860 | 2,825 | | −9.8% |
| 1870 | 2,868 | | 1.5% |
| 1880 | 2,726 | | −5.0% |
| 1890 | 2,200 | | −19.3% |
| 1900 | 2,100 | | −4.5% |
| 1910 | 1,949 | | −7.2% |
| 1920 | 1,547 | | −20.6% |
| 1930 | 1,504 | | −2.8% |
| 1940 | 1,592 | | 5.9% |
| 1950 | 1,481 | | −7.0% |
| 1960 | 1,376 | | −7.1% |
| 1970 | 1,457 | | 5.9% |
| 1980 | 1,870 | | 28.3% |
| 1990 | 2,231 | | 19.3% |
| 2000 | 2,249 | | 0.8% |
| 2010 | 2,114 | | −6.0% |
| 2016 (est.) | 2,029 | | −4.0% |
U.S. Decennial Census

As of the census of 2000, there were 2,249 people, 792 households, and 564 families residing in the town. The population density was 34.9 inhabitants per square mile (13.5/km^{2}). There were 1,058 housing units at an average density of 16.4 per square mile (6.3/km^{2}). The racial makeup of the town was 96.31% White, 1.11% African American, 0.22% Native American, 0.89% Asian, 0.31% from other races, and 1.16% from two or more races. Hispanic or Latino people of any race were 1.24% of the population.

There were 792 households, out of which 32.6% had children under the age of 18 living with them, 58.8% were married couples living together, 7.3% had a female householder with no husband present, and 28.7% were non-families. 24.1% of all households were made up of individuals, and 10.9% had someone living alone who was 65 years of age or older. The average household size was 2.52 and the average family size was 2.98.

In the town, the population was spread out, with 22.5% under the age of 18, 6.0% from 18 to 24, 23.9% from 25 to 44, 25.2% from 45 to 64, and 22.4% who were 65 years of age or older. The median age was 43 years. For every 100 females, there were 96.4 males. For every 100 females age 18 and over, there were 89.8 males.

The median income for a household in the town was $39,625, and the median income for a family was $43,750. Males had a median income of $34,583 versus $25,795 for females. The per capita income for the town was $21,076. About 5.0% of families and 7.0% of the population were below the poverty line, including 8.4% of those under age 18 and 6.8% of those age 65 or over.

== Communities and locations in Middlefield ==
- Bowerstown – A hamlet southeast of Cooperstown on County Route 52
- Cooperstown – The eastern part of the Village of Cooperstown
- Cooperstown-Westville Airport (K23) – An airport in the southern part of Middlefield
- Cornish Hill – An elevation southeast of Cooperstown
- Eggleston Hill – An elevation south of Cornish Hill
- Glimmerglass State Park – A small part of the state park is at the northern town line by County Highway 31
- Hyde Bay – Part of the bay of Otsego Lake is in the northwestern part of the town.
- Lentsville – A hamlet in the northern part of the town, south of Middlefield Center on County Road 33
- Middlefield – Formerly known as Clarksville, the hamlet of Middlefield lies on County Road 35 on the eastern edge of the town. The hamlet was placed on the National Register of Historic Places in 1985.
- Middlefield Center – A small cluster of houses located on County Route 33
- Moss Pond – A lake located south-southeast of Phoenix Mills
- Murphy Hill – An elevation east of Cooperstown
- Phoenix Mills – A hamlet in the southern part of the town
- Westville – A hamlet on County Route 35, south of the hamlet of Middlefield
- Whig Corners – A hamlet northeast of Cooperstown on County Route 33
