= Terpenning–Johnson House and Cemetery =

Historic place in Schoharie County, New York

- U.S. National Register of Historic Places
- Location within New York Location within the United States
- Location: 674 Brooker Hollow Rd., Brooker Hollow, New York
- Coordinates: 42°37′42″N 74°36′27″W
- Area: 3.71 acres (1.50 ha)
- Built: c. 1810, c. 1845
- Architectural style: Early Republic
- NRHP reference No.: 12001260
- Added to NRHP: February 5, 2013

Terpenning–Johnson House and Cemetery is a historic home and family cemetery located at Brooker Hollow, Schoharie County, New York, United States. The main block was built about 1845, and is a two-story, five-bay, dwelling with a 1 1/2-story side wing built about 1810. Both sections have gable roofs rest on a stone foundation. Also on the property are the contributing family cemetery with burials dated from 1812 to 1873, garage (c. 1840s), workshop (c. 1840s), and barn (1840s).

It was listed on the National Register of Historic Places in 2013.
