= Cherry Valley (village), New York =

Village in Otsego County, New York, United States

Cherry Valley, New York
- Village
- Location within the state of New York
- Coordinates: 42°47′49″N 74°45′15″W
- Country: United States
- State: New York
- County: Otsego
- Town: Cherry Valley

Area
  - Total: 0.51 sq mi (1.32 km^{2})
  - Land: 0.51 sq mi (1.32 km^{2})
  - Water: 0 sq mi (0.00 km^{2})
- Elevation: 1,350 ft (410 m)

Population (2020)
  - Total: 467
  - Density: 916.4/sq mi (353.82/km^{2})
- Time zone: UTC-5 (Eastern (EST))
  - Summer (DST): UTC-4 (EDT)
- ZIP codes: 13320, 13450
- Area code: 607
- FIPS code: 36-15242
- GNIS feature ID: 0946532
- Website: cherryvalleyny.us

Cherry Valley is a village in Otsego County, New York, United States. The population was 520 at the 2010 census. The village is in the town of Cherry Valley, approximately 13 miles northeast of Cooperstown and eight miles east of the northern end of Otsego Lake.

== History ==
The village was established in 1740 by John Lindesay under the name Lindesay's Bush. The name was changed to Cherry Valley by Reverend Dunlop. On November 11, 1778, during the American Revolution, forty-seven village residents were killed by a British and Iroquois raiding party, an event to become known as the Cherry Valley Massacre.

The village was incorporated in 1812, and was thus set apart from the town.

The Cherry Valley Village Historic District was listed on the National Register of Historic Places in 1988.

== Geography ==
According to the United States Census Bureau, the village has a total area of 0.6 square miles (1.5 km^{2}), all land.

The village is located on New York State Route 166 at the junction of County Highways 50 and 54. It is in the northeastern part of the county.

Cherry Valley Creek flows southward through the village.

== Demographics ==
Historical population
Census	Pop.	Note	%±
1870	930		—
1880	856		−8.0%
1890	685		−20.0%
1900	772		12.7%
1910	792		2.6%
1920	728		−8.1%
1930	707		−2.9%
1940	704		−0.4%
1950	760		8.0%
1960	668		−12.1%
1970	661		−1.0%
1980	684		3.5%
1990	617		−9.8%
2000	592		−4.1%
2010	520		−12.2%
2020	467		−10.2%
U.S. Decennial Census

As of the census of 2000, there were 592 people, 237 households, and 159 families residing in the village. The population density was 1,041.5 inhabitants per square mile (402.1/km^{2}). There were 288 housing units at an average density of 506.7 per square mile (195.6/km^{2}). The racial makeup of the village was 98.99% White, 0.51% Asian, and 0.51% from two or more races. Hispanic or Latino of any race were 0.17% of the population.

There were 237 households, out of which 29.5% had children under the age of 18 living with them, 51.9% were married couples living together, 12.7% had a female householder with no husband present, and 32.5% were non-families. 28.3% of all households were made up of individuals, and 12.7% had someone living alone who was 65 years of age or older. The average household size was 2.50 and the average family size was 3.08.

In the village, the population was spread out, with 25.0% under the age of 18, 7.1% from 18 to 24, 24.8% from 25 to 44, 26.4% from 45 to 64, and 16.7% who were 65 years of age or older. The median age was 41 years. For every 100 females, there were 84.4 males. For every 100 females age 18 and over, there were 81.2 males.

The median income for a household in the village was $35,375, and the median income for a family was $41,375. Males had a median income of $27,083 versus $20,104 for females. The per capita income for the village was $15,808. About 9.8% of families and 13.3% of the population were below the poverty line, including 18.5% of those under age 18 and 4.9% of those age 65 or over.

== Additional village facts ==
The village is somewhat off the beaten path (In spite of US Route 20 passing a few miles north), not much visited by tourists; Jack Kerouac and Allen Ginsberg used to visit to escape city life, especially in the autumn when the maple leaves change color. Many people around Cherry Valley are dairy farmers; tapping maple trees for sap, which is then refined into syrup, is a common spring practice. The area looks much like it did in the 19th century. Historic re-enactments are held to commemorate the importance of Cherry Valley during the American Revolution.

Area attractions include the Baseball Hall of Fame, the Bates Hop House, Cherry Valley Museum, Judd Falls, Otsego Lake, and Glimmerglass State Park. There is an annual Memorial Day celebration which includes a Craft Fair, Bake sale, Flea Market, Chicken BBQ, and parade.

== Historical and cultural significance ==
Cherry Valley was the birthplace of John H. Funk (1817-1871), State Assemblyman from New York City in 1857, and his younger sister, Jane (1823-1860), better known as the "notorious" courtesan Fanny White.

Cherry Valley has a long history as an artist and writer's community. Willa Cather left New York City for the isolated village in 1911, writing O Pioneers! while there. Poet Allen Ginsberg bought a farm there in the 1960s, and the town became a haven and destination point for many of the major personalities of the Beat scene: William Burroughs, Gregory Corso, Peter Orlovsky, Herbert Huncke, Ray Bremser, Anne Waldman, Robert Creeley, Lawrence Ferlinghetti, Harry Smith, and many others all spent time either living or visiting there. Poet Charles Plymell still lives in Cherry Valley — he and his wife ran Cherry Valley Editions from their home, publishing small editions of major writers. Jazz pianist Paul Bley is a resident as are Mark Mastroianni and National Book Award nominated novelist Dana Spiotta.

Transgender pioneer, actress and Andy Warhol Superstar Candy Darling is buried in the historic Cherry Valley Cemetery. A significant portion of Beautiful Darling (2010), a documentary film about her life, was shot in Cherry Valley. Photographer Ryan McGinley staged several photo shoots in and around the village, and the artist Dash Snow shot Sisyphus, Sissy Fuss, Silly Puss, one of his later 8mm pieces, there in late May 2009.

Actress Jill Flint (Royal Pains and The Night Shift) was born and raised in Cherry Valley. Singer, musician and composer Vanessa Bley (daughter of Paul Bley) was raised in Cherry Valley.
