= O'Connell Brook =

- Location of the mouth of O' Connell Brook

Location
- Country: United States
- State: New York
- County: Otsego

Physical characteristics
- Source
  - coordinates: 42°43′10″N 74°52′13″W
- Mouth: Cherry Valley Creek
  - coordinates: 42°41′27″N 74°50′34″W
  - elevation: 1,234 ft (376 m)

O'Connell Brook is a river in Otsego County, New York. It converges with Cherry Valley Creek northwest of Middlefield. On 1903 county maps it is referred to as Elm Brook.
