= Willow Creek (Cherry Valley Creek tributary) =

- Location of the mouth of Willow Creek

Location
- Country: United States
- State: New York
- County: Otsego

Physical characteristics
- Source
  - coordinates: 42°43′41″N 74°50′17″W
- Mouth: Cherry Valley Creek
  - coordinates: 42°41′40″N 74°50′15″W

Willow Creek is a river in Otsego County, New York. It converges with Cherry Valley Creek north of Middlefield.
