= Belvedere Lake =

Lake in the state of New York, United States

- Location of Belvedere Lake within New York State
- Location: Otsego County, New York
- Coordinates: 42°44′49″N 74°45′24″W
- Surface area: 30 acres (12 ha)
- Surface elevation: 1,444 feet (440 m)
- Settlements: Roseboom, New York

Belvedere Lake is a small lake located east-northeast of the Hamlet of Roseboom in the Town of Roseboom in Otsego County, New York.
