= Bunn–Tillapaugh Feed Mill =

- U.S. National Register of Historic Places
- Location within New York Location within the United States
- Nearest city: Richmondville, New York
- Coordinates: 42°37′59″N 74°33′50″W
- Area: less than one acre
- Built: 1885
- NRHP reference No.: 06000894
- Added to NRHP: September 29, 2006

Bunn–Tillapaugh Feed Mill is a historic feed mill located at Richmondville in Schoharie County, New York. The main portion of the mill building is a 40 foot by 60 foot, rectangular, four story heavy timber-framed building sheathed in narrow clapboard siding. The mill rests on a stone basement story, built into the steep bank of Bear Gulch, a tributary of Cobleskill Creek. Located adjacent is the mill pond.

It was listed on the National Register of Historic Places in 2006.
