= Roseboom Historic District =

Historic district in New York, United States

- U.S. National Register of Historic Places
- U.S. Historic district
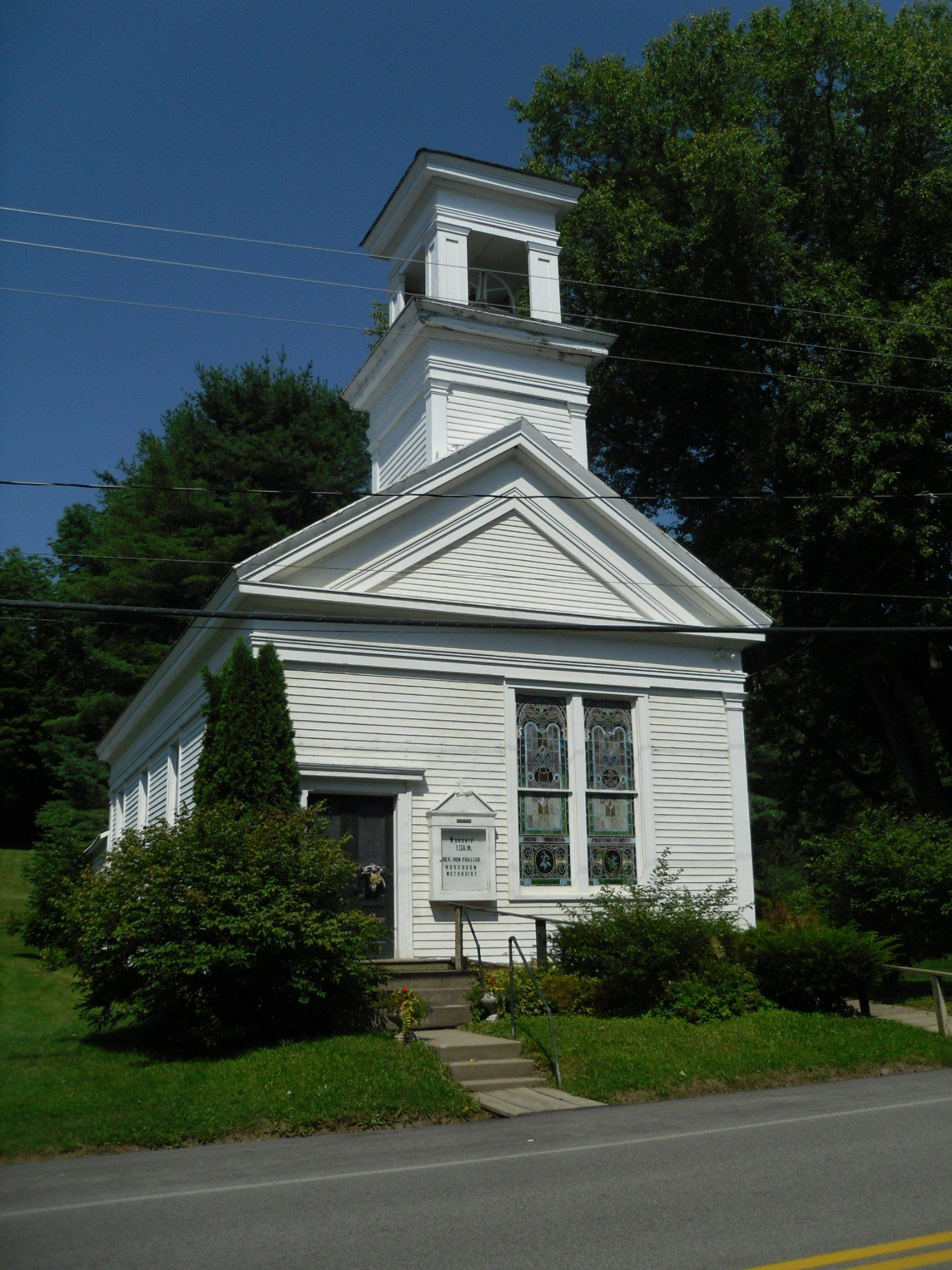
- Methodist Church, August 2010

- Location within New York Location within the United States
- Location: Roughly along NY 166, NY 165, Beaver, John Deer and Gage Rds., Roseboom, New York
- Coordinates: 42°44′21″N 74°46′16″W
- Area: 200 acres (81 ha)
- Architectural style: Federal, Greek Revival, Italianate
- NRHP reference No.: 98001394
- Added to NRHP: November 19, 1998

Roseboom Historic District is a national historic district located at Roseboom in Otsego County, New York. It encompasses 73 contributing buildings and two contributing structures. The district includes two churches, a cemetery associated with the former Baptist church, a general store, two early 20th century industrial buildings, a schoolhouse (now used as a dwelling), a grange hall (now disused), and dwellings with associated agricultural, industrial, and commercial outbuildings. The bulk of these properties were developed between 1840 and 1900.

It was listed on the National Register of Historic Places in 1998.
