= The Tepee =

Historic commercial building in New York, United States

- U.S. National Register of Historic Places
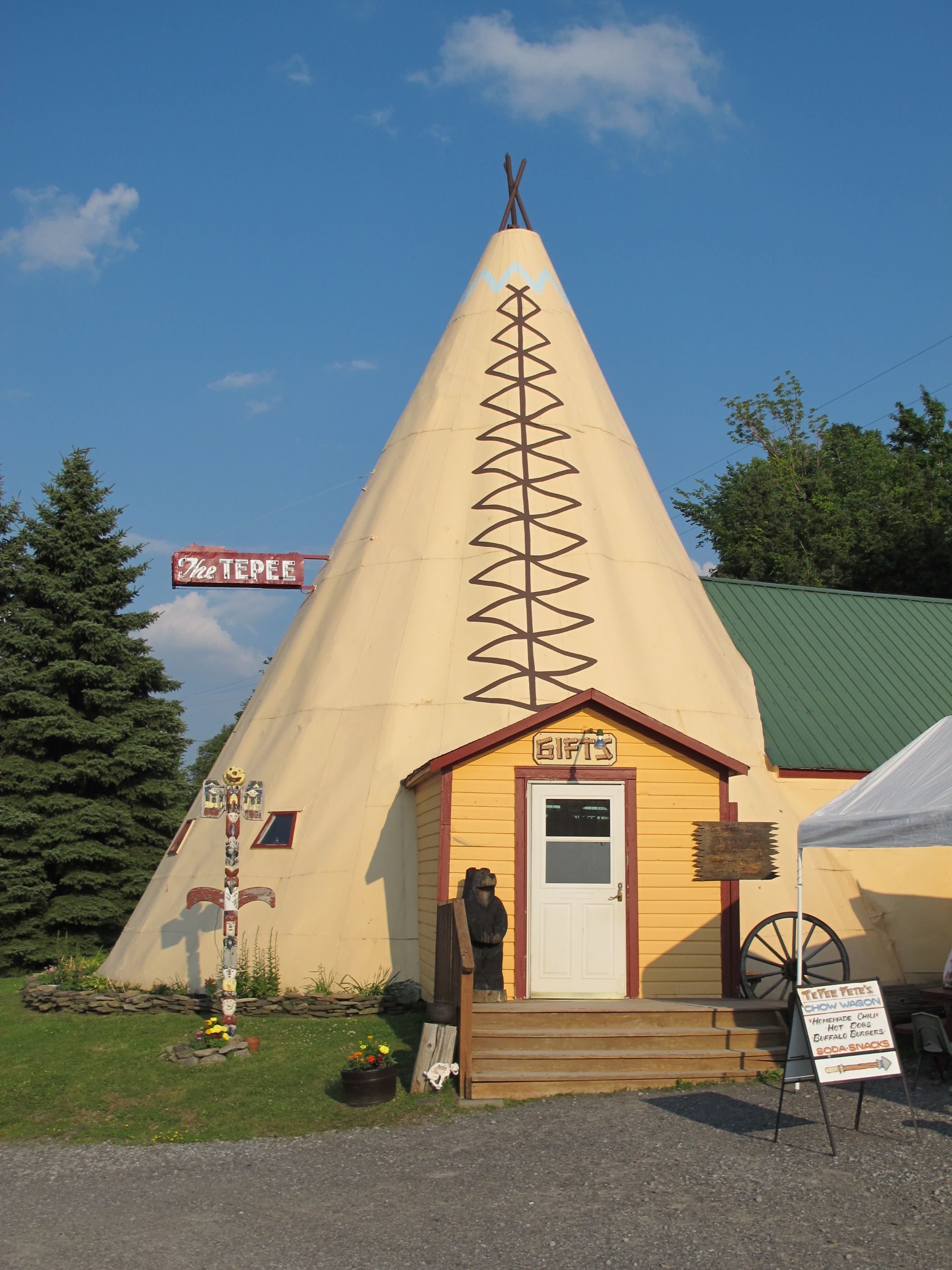
- The TePee, July 2014

- Location within New York Location within the United States
- Location: 7632 US 20, near Cherry Valley, New York
- Coordinates: 42°48′28″N 74°41′04″W
- Area: 2.2 acres (0.89 ha)
- Built: 1954
- NRHP reference No.: 11000543
- Added to NRHP: August 18, 2011

The Tepee is a historic commercial building and roadside attraction located near Cherry Valley in Otsego County, New York, United States. It was built in 1954, and is a wood-frame structure sheathed in galvanized steel on a concrete foundation. It measures 50 feet tall and 42 feet in diameter. It has four levels. Attached to the tepee is an L-shaped wood-frame building with a cross-gable roof. The building houses a gift shop and food stand.

It was listed on the National Register of Historic Places in 2011.
