= Richmondville United Methodist Church =

Historic church in New York, United States

- U.S. National Register of Historic Places
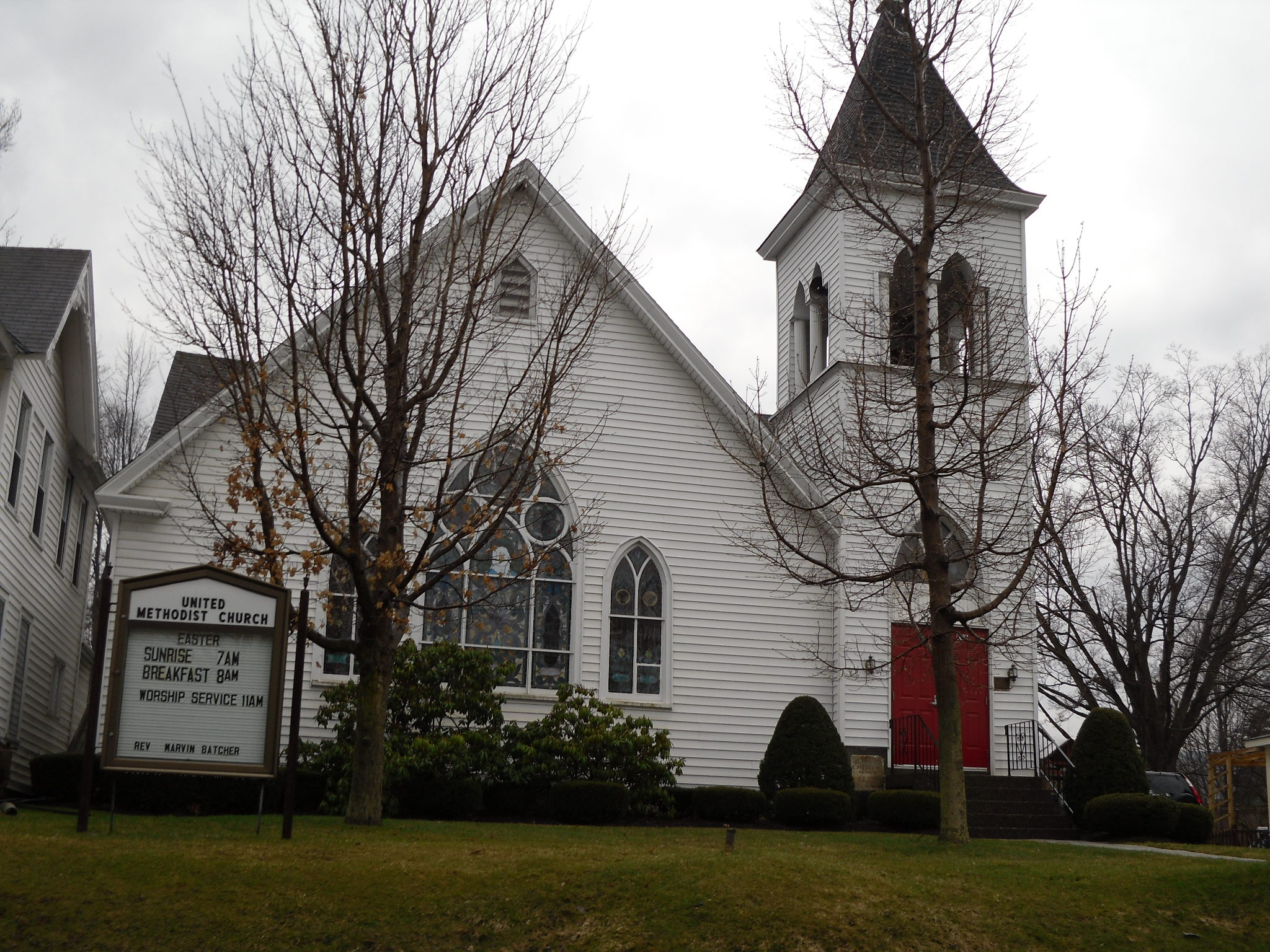
- Richmondville United Methodist Church, April 2010

- Location within New York Location within the United States
- Location: 266 Main St., Richmondville, New York
- Coordinates: 42°37′57″N 74°33′56″W
- Area: 0 acres (0 ha)
- Built: 1893
- NRHP reference No.: 06000575
- Added to NRHP: July 14, 2006

Richmondville United Methodist Church is a historic United Methodist church at 266 Main Street in Richmondville, Schoharie County, New York. It is a nearly square building with an engaged entrance / bell tower built about 1900. The two story, gable and hipped roof, wood frame parsonage was built in 1893.

It was listed on the National Register of Historic Places in 2006.
