= Cherry Valley Village Historic District =

Historic district in New York, United States

- U.S. National Register of Historic Places
- U.S. Historic district
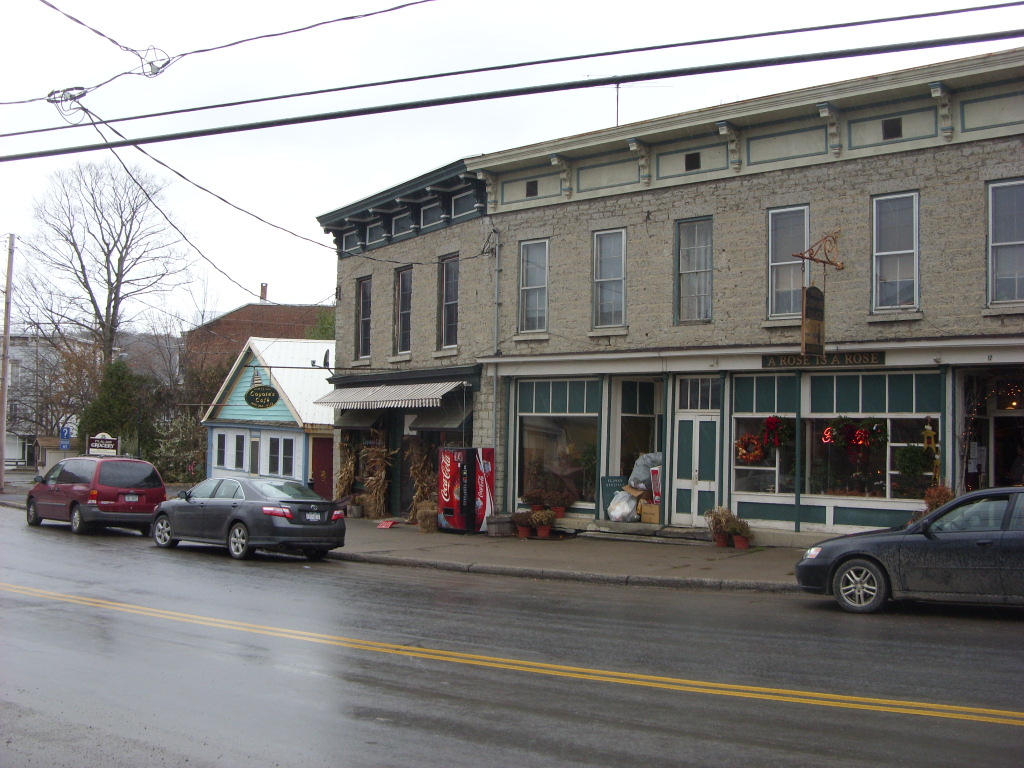
- Cherry Valley Village Historic District, November 2008

- Location within New York Location within the United States
- Location: Roughly bounded by Alden St. and Montgomery St., Maple Ave. and Elm St., and Main St., Cherry Valley, New York
- Coordinates: 42°47′48″N 74°45′9″W
- Area: 95 acres (38 ha)
- Architect: Multiple
- Architectural style: Greek Revival, Italianate, Federal
- NRHP reference No.: 88000472
- Added to NRHP: April 28, 1988

- Lindesay Patent Rural Historic District (Boundary Increase)
- U.S. National Register of Historic Places
- U.S. Historic district
- Location within New York Location within the United States
- Location: Roughly bounded by US 20, NY 166, Fields Rd., O'Neil Rd., Co. Rd. 33 and Shipway Rd., Cherry Valley, New York
- Coordinates: 42°50′57″N 74°46′47″W
- Area: 9,105 acres (3,685 ha)
- Built: 1778
- Architectural style: Late Victorian, Mid 19th Century Revival, Federal
- NRHP reference No.: 95001024
- Added to NRHP: August 18, 1995

Cherry Valley Village Historic District is a national historic district in Cherry Valley in Otsego County, New York. It was listed on the National Register of Historic Places in 1988. It encompasses 226 contributing buildings, one contributing site, three contributing structures, and two contributing objects. Its boundaries were increased in 1995, by an area called the Lindesay Patent Rural Historic District. It encompasses 331 contributing buildings.
