= Bowerstown, New York =

- hamlet
- Location within New York
- Coordinates: 42°41′09″N 74°55′04″W
- Country: United States
- State: New York
- County: Otsego
- Town: Middlefield
- Elevation: 1,273 ft (388 m)
- Time zone: UTC-5 (Eastern (EST))
  - Summer (DST): UTC-4 (EDT)
- ZIP code: 13326
- Area code: 607
- GNIS feature ID: 944516

Bowerstown is a hamlet in the town of Middlefield, Otsego County, New York, United States. The ZIP code is 13326.
