= Roseboom, New York =

- Town
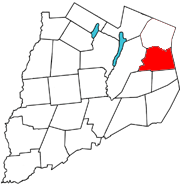
- Roseboom, Otsego County, New York
- Coordinates: 42°42′40″N 74°43′36″W
- Country: United States
- State: New York
- County: Otsego

Area
  - Total: 33.51 sq mi (86.79 km^{2})
  - Land: 33.41 sq mi (86.52 km^{2})
  - Water: 0.10 sq mi (0.27 km^{2})
- Elevation: 1,453 ft (443 m)

Population (2010)
  - Total: 711
  - Estimate (2016): 679
  - Density: 20.3/sq mi (7.85/km^{2})
- Time zone: UTC-5 (Eastern (EST))
  - Summer (DST): UTC-4 (EDT)
- ZIP code: 13450
- Area code: 607
- FIPS code: 36-63638
- GNIS feature ID: 0979434
- Website: townofroseboom.com

Roseboom is a town in Otsego County, New York, United States. The population was 690 at the 2020 census, down from 711 at the 2010 census. The name of the town is taken from those of early landowners and settlers Abram and John Roseboom.

The Town of Roseboom is at the eastern county line.

== History ==
The town was not settled until after the American Revolution.

The town was created from part of the Town of Cherry Valley in 1854.

== Geography ==
According to the United States Census Bureau, the town has a total area of 33.1 square miles (86 km^{2}), of which 33.0 square miles (85 km^{2}) is land and 0.1 square miles (0.26 km^{2}) of it (0.18%) is water.

New York State Route 165 intersects New York State Route 166 near the western town line at Roseboom village.

Cherry Valley Creek flows southward near the western town line, receiving the inflow of Pleasant Brook and Snyder Creek.

== Demographics ==
Historical population
Census	Pop.	Note	%±
1860	1,870		—
1870	1,589		−15.0%
1880	1,515		−4.7%
1890	1,190		−21.5%
1900	1,031		−13.4%
1910	885		−14.2%
1920	773		−12.7%
1930	633		−18.1%
1940	534		−15.6%
1950	570		6.7%
1960	518		−9.1%
1970	483		−6.8%
1980	630		30.4%
1990	668		6.0%
2000	684		2.4%
2010	711		3.9%
2016 (est.)	679		−4.5%
U.S. Decennial Census

As of the census of 2000, there were 684 people, 267 households, and 191 families residing in the town. The population density was 20.7 people per square mile (8.0 people/km^{2}). There were 416 housing units at an average density of 12.6 units per square mile (4.9 units/km^{2}). The racial makeup of the town was 98.39% White, 0.15% African American, 0.88% Asian, 0.15% from other races, and 0.44% from two or more races. Hispanic or Latino of any race were 0.73% of the population.

There were 267 households, out of which 33.3% had children under the age of 18 living with them, 55.1% were married couples living together, 9.4% had a female householder with no husband present, and 28.1% were non-families. 21.0% of all households were made up of individuals, and 8.6% had someone living alone who was 65 years of age or older. The average household size was 2.56 and the average family size was 2.98.

In the town, the population was spread out, with 24.4% under the age of 18, 7.5% from 18 to 24, 27.8% from 25 to 44, 27.6% from 45 to 64, and 12.7% who were 65 years of age or older. The median age was 39 years. For every 100 females, there were 106.6 males. For every 100 females age 18 and over, there were 106.8 males.

The median income for a household in the town was $37,841, and the median income for a family was $43,438. Males had a median income of $24,205 versus $19,940 for females. The per capita income for the town was $19,977. About 7.4% of families and 10.6% of the population were below the poverty line, including 19.4% of those under age 18 and 2.7% of those age 65 or over.

== Communities and locations in Roseboom ==
- Belvedere Lake – A small lake east of Roseboom village.
- Butlers Corners – A location southwest of South Valley hamlet at the junction of County Roads 34 and 39.
- Center Valley – A hamlet on County Route 50 at the town line in the northeastern corner of Roseboom.
- Honey Hill – An elevation north of South Valley.
- Lowell's Corners – A former location in the eastern part of Roseboom.
- Pleasant Brook – A hamlet in the eastern part of Roseboom on NY-165.
- Pleasant Brook – A stream flowing westward past the hamlet of Pleasant Brook.
- Roseboom (earlier "Lodi") – A hamlet near the western town line, located at the junction of routes NY-165 and NY-166 by Cherry Valley Creek. The Roseboom Historic District was listed on the National Register of Historic Places in 1998.
- South Valley – A hamlet located in the southern half of Roseboon on NY-165. The Women's Community Club of South Valley was listed on the National Register of Historic Places in 1999.
- Weaver Hill – An elevation east of South Valley.
- Weber Corners – A location at the eastern town line on NY-165.
- Winnie Hollow – A valley in the northern part of the town.
