= Middlefield Hamlet Historic District =

Historic district in New York, United States

- U.S. National Register of Historic Places
- U.S. Historic district
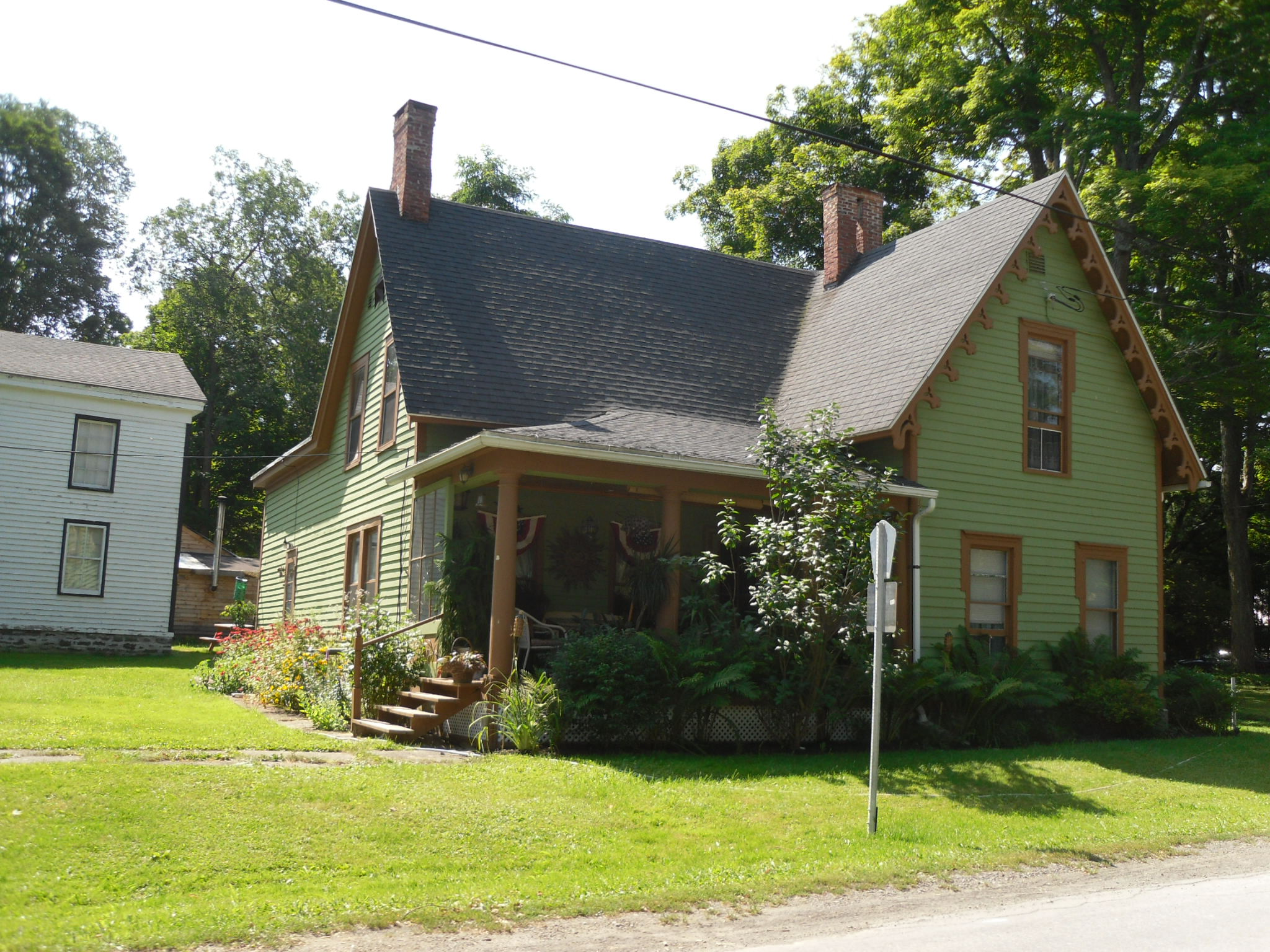
- Ca. 1850 Carpenter Cothic Cottage, August 2010

- Location within New York Location within the United States
- Location: CR 35, Rezen, Whiteman, and Long Patent Rds., Middlefield, New York
- Coordinates: 42°41′14″N 74°50′29″W
- Area: 22 acres (8.9 ha)
- Architectural style: Late Victorian, Federal, Carpenter Gothic
- NRHP reference No.: 85001523
- Added to NRHP: July 11, 1985

Middlefield Hamlet Historic District is a national historic district located at Middlefield in Otsego County, New York. It encompasses 24 contributing principal buildings and eight contributing dependencies. All but one of the buildings are residences. It also includes a Greek Revival style frame store building.

It was listed on the National Register of Historic Places in 1985.
