= Women's Community Club of South Valley =

- U.S. National Register of Historic Places
- Location within New York Location within the United States
- Location: 472 Kirshman Hill Rd., South Valley, New York
- Coordinates: 42°42′21″N 74°42′40″W
- Area: less than one acre
- Built: 1846
- Architectural style: Greek Revival
- NRHP reference No.: 98001617
- Added to NRHP: February 1, 1999

Women's Community Club of South Valley, originally South Valley Union Church, is a historic church building located at South Valley in Otsego County, New York. It was built in 1846 in the Greek Revival style and slightly altered in 1879 with the addition of contemporary Victorian decoration. It is a one-story wood-frame building on a shallow rubble stone foundation. After its religious function ceased in the mid-1940s, the building was adapted for community use by the Ladies Missionary Aid Society. In 1971 the building was taken over by the Women's Community Club of South Valley.

It was listed on the National Register of Historic Places in 1999.
