= Shellrock Creek =

- Location of the mouth of Shellrock Creek

Location
- Country: United States
- State: New York
- County: Otsego

Physical characteristics
- Source
  - coordinates: 42°45′53″N 74°48′59″W
- Mouth: Cherry Valley Creek
  - coordinates: 42°42′04″N 74°49′17″W
  - elevation: 1,220 ft (370 m)

Shellrock Creek is a river in Otsego County, New York. It converges with Cherry Valley Creek northeast of Middlefield.
