= Mount Independence (New York) =

Mountain in New York, United States

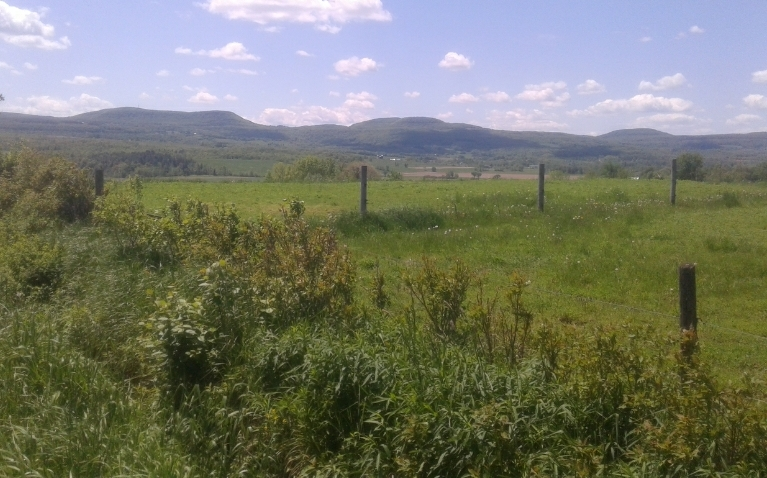
- Mount Independence (left) in May 2019

Highest point
- Elevation: 2,221 feet (677 m)
- Coordinates: 42°47′37″N 74°41′42″W

Geography
- Location within New York Adirondack Park Location within the United States
- Location: Cherry Valley, New York, U.S.
- Topo map: USGS Sprout Brook

Mount Independence is a mountain located in the Central New York Region of New York east of the Village of Cherry Valley. Take County Route 50 from the center of Cherry Valley to the top of the mountain.
