= Benjamin D. North House =

Historic house in New York, United States

- U.S. National Register of Historic Places
- Location within New York Location within the United States
- Location: NY 166, The Plank Rd., Middlefield, New York
- Coordinates: 42°42′12″N 74°50′8″W
- Area: 14.7 acres (5.9 ha)
- Built: 1799-1802
- Architectural style: Federal
- NRHP reference No.: 85001499
- Added to NRHP: July 11, 1985

Benjamin D. North House is a historic home located at Middlefield in Otsego County, New York. It was built between 1799 and 1802 and is a two-story, five-bay, center-hall plan Federal style bank dwelling. It is built of brick with a 1 1/2-story frame wing. Also on the property is a smokehouse (ca. 1800), a small frame privy with clapboard siding (ca. 1850), and a horse barn built about 1800 with a substantial extension added about 1890.

It was listed on the National Register of Historic Places in 1985.
