= Cherry Valley Creek (New York) =

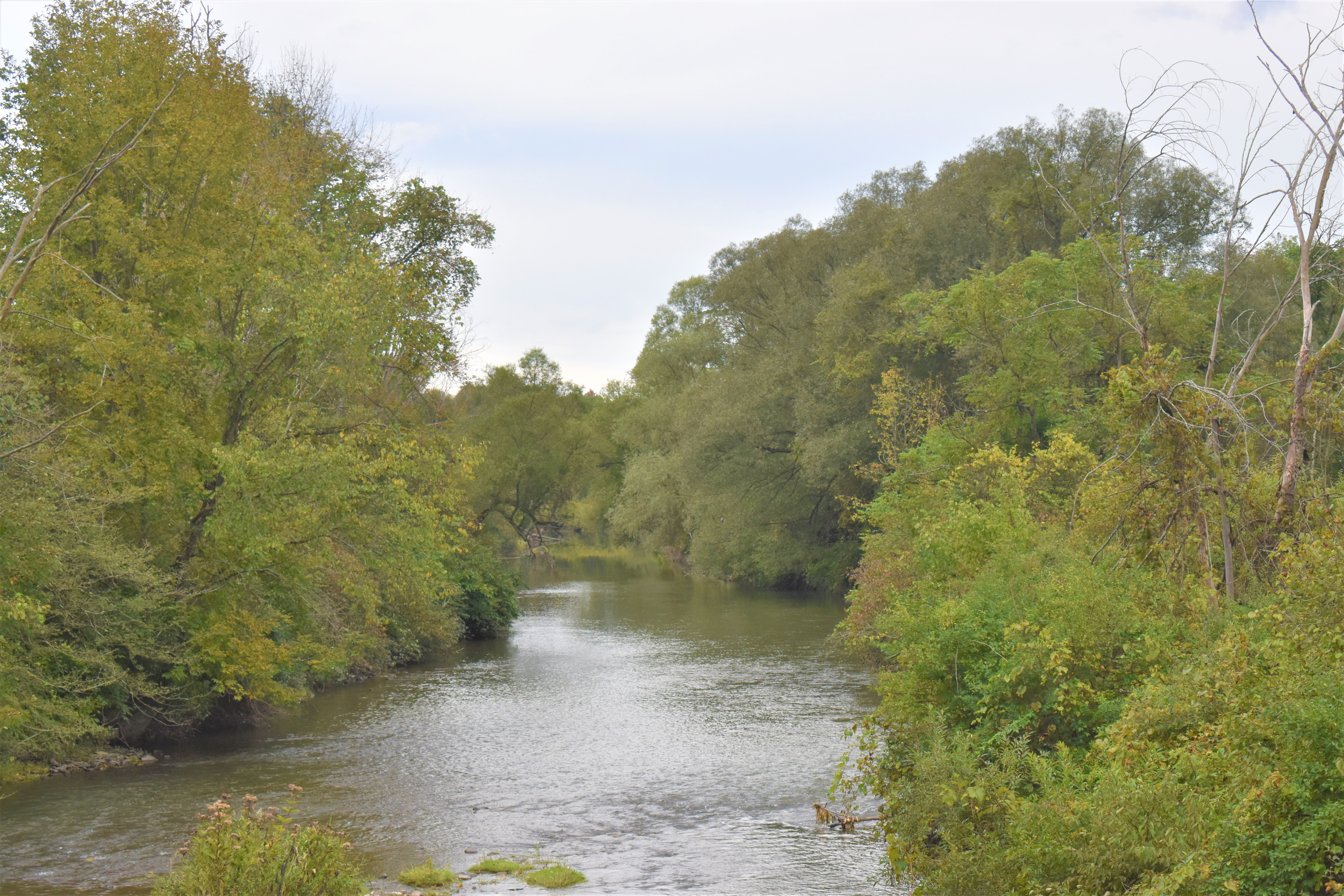
- Cherry Valley Creek downstream of County Route 43 by Westville

- Location of the mouth of the Cherry Valley Creek in New York State. Cherry Valley Creek (New York) (the United States)

Location
- Country: United States
- State: New York
- Region: Central New York
- County: Otsego

Physical characteristics
- Source
  - location: Near Cherry Valley
  - coordinates: 42°49′57″N 74°46′38″W
- Mouth: Susquehanna River
  - location: Milford
  - coordinates: 42°35′26″N 74°55′54″W
- Length: 34.1 mi (54.9 km)

Basin features
- Tributaries
  - left: Pleasant Brook
  - right: Shellrock Creek, Willow Creek, O' Connell Brook

Cherry Valley Creek is a 34.1-mile-long (54.9 km) headwater tributary of the Susquehanna River in central New York, United States.

Cherry Valley Creek flows southwesterly through the Cherry Valley in Otsego County, making its way through the towns of Cherry Valley, Roseboom, and Middlefield before joining the Susquehanna River east of the village of Milford.

== See also ==
- List of rivers of New York
