= Westville (hamlet), New York =

Westville, New York
- hamlet
- Location within New York
- Coordinates: 42°37′38″N 74°52′50″W
- Country: United States
- State: New York
- County: Otsego
- Town: Middlefield
- Elevation: 1,230 ft (370 m)
- Time zone: UTC-5 (Eastern (EST))
  - Summer (DST): UTC-4 (EDT)
- ZIP code: 13326
- Area code: 607
- GNIS feature ID: 970950

Westville is a hamlet in the town of Middlefield, Otsego County, New York, United States. The ZIP code is 13326.
