= Cornish Hill =

Mountain in New York, United States

- Location within New York Location within the United States

Highest point
- Elevation: 2,231 feet (680 m)
- Coordinates: 42°39′30″N 74°54′44″W

Geography
- Location: Cooperstown, New York, U.S.
- Topo map: USGS Cooperstown

Cornish Hill is a small mountain chain, made of two main elevations the tallest being 2,231 feet (680 m). Cornish Hill is located in the Central New York region of New York southeast Cooperstown, New York.

== Geography ==
Cornish Hill lies between two roads: Campbell Hill Road and Sibley Gulf Road, which is a fork road diverting off from Cornish Hill road which runs adjacent to Sibley. Roughly a mile southwest lies a pond named Moss Pond in Otsego County which is publicly accessible area used for fishing.

== Railway history ==
In the 1870s, the Adirondack Railway, later bought in 1889 by the Delaware & Hudson Railway, ran through towns near Cornish Hill including Thurman, Hadley, and Stony Creek among others. These towns subsequently obtained a number of railroad crossings including two grade crossings north and south of Cornish Hill and stations, such as Thurman Station built in 1871 among others. The line ran near to Cornish Hill and had several incidents over the years. On March 3, 1887, a three-locomotive passenger and mail train derailed along an embankment, there were no reported injuries, although several nearly were injured or killed. Nearly a year later on March 12, during The Great Blizzard of 1888, a train wrecked at Cornish Hill, 5 miles from Hadley. Adirondack Superintendent Durkee assembled a rescue crew of 60 to free the derailed train, and ensuring its arrival to Saratoga Springs by the 14th. Another incident was years later in 1897 when a conspiracy to derail and rob the Adirondack Express by a 15-year-old boy named Morris Winslow, who was arrested once authorities overheard.

In 1927, there were hearings in Saratoga in April to eliminate 49 grade crossings near Cornish Hill and other areas, which was discontinued in December coming to the conclusion that there wasn't any substantial reason for them to be removed. Although it appears these crossings and section of rail line have been taken out in the last 95 years.
