= John Lindesay =

John Lindesay (died 1751) was the founder of the settlement of Cherry Valley, in Otsego County, New York. He was a native of Scotland, and in December, 1730, he was commissioned as a naval officer of the port of New York by Governor John Montgomerie.

From 1732 to 1739 he served as Sheriff of Albany, New York. By patents dated from 1736 to 1741, Lindesay acquired about 20,000 acres (80 km²) of public land throughout the Province of New York. In 1740, he moved to his land at present-day Cherry Valley with his wife, her father Lieutenant Congreve, and their servants. He named the place Lindesay's Bush.

Being inexperienced at farming, and with the French and Indian War at hand, Lindesay returned to the military and in 1744 was sent as a reinforcement to Fort Oswego on the western frontier.

He was in Schenectady, New York in the winter of 1746-47. On October 17, 1747, the Council taking into consideration several petitions of the Oswego traders, praying the Governor to continue Lieutenant Lindesay in the command of the garrison at Oswego, and the request of the Indians of the Six Nations to the same purpose; and being also of opinion from their own knowledge of Mr. Lindesay, that he is well qualified for that command, and the more so on the account of his engaging Address to the Indians, unanimously resolved to recommend his Excellency to order Lieutenant Lindesay to repair to Oswego, to take the command of the garrison there. He was commandant at that post until February, 1749, when he was appointed Indian commissary and agent there. He retained the latter situation until his death, which occurred in 1751. His widow, Penelope Lindesay, survived him, but they had no children. At the time of his death, Mr. Lindesay was a lieutenant in Captain Clarke's company of Independent Fuzileers.
