= Pleasant Brook =

- Location of the mouth of Pleasant Brook

Location
- Country: United States
- State: New York
- County: Otsego

Physical characteristics
- Source: Plank Pond
  - coordinates: 42°41′51″N 74°40′58″W
  - elevation: 1,568 ft (478 m)
- Mouth: Cherry Valley Creek
  - coordinates: 42°43′07″N 74°47′18″W
  - elevation: 1,237 ft (377 m)

Basin features
- Tributaries
  - right: Snyder Creek

Pleasant Brook is a river in Otsego County, New York. It converges with Cherry Valley Creek west of Pleasant Brook.
