= Richmondville, New York =

- Town
- Location in Schoharie County and the state of New York.
- Coordinates: 42°38′2″N 74°34′0″W
- Country: United States
- State: New York
- County: Schoharie

Government
  - Type: Town Council
  - Town Supervisor: Jeffrey Haslun (R)
  - Town Council: Members' List: • Roy Bilby (R); • William Lancaster (R); • Paul Maurice (R); • Todd Sperbeck (R)

Area
  - Total: 30.22 sq mi (78.28 km^{2})
  - Land: 30.16 sq mi (78.11 km^{2})
  - Water: 0.066 sq mi (0.17 km^{2})

Population (2020)
  - Total: 2,466
  - Density: 82.3/sq mi (31.76/km^{2})
- Time zone: UTC-5 (Eastern (EST))
  - Summer (DST): UTC-4 (EDT)
- FIPS code: 36-095-61599
- Website: Town website

Richmondville is a town in Schoharie County, New York, United States. The population was 2,466 at the 2020 census. The town name was adapted from the name of a post office in its territory.

The Town of Richmondville has within itself a village called Richmondville. The town is at the western border of the county and is northeast of Oneonta.

== History ==
The town was first settled circa 1764, near the community of Warnerville.

The "Battle of Cobleskill", fought during the American Revolution, actually took place in Richmondville.

The town was formed from part of the territory of Cobleskill in 1849. In 1851, the town added territory from the town of Seward.

In 1881, the community of Richmondville set itself off from the town by incorporating as a village.

Richmondville was, for many years, the location of the Central School for surrounding communities. The school, built in 1932, was originally called Richmondville Central School, educating children from K-12. The school now serves as an elementary school and was renamed the JOSEPH B.RADEZ Elementary School after its long-time school principal. The school is part of the Cobleskill-Richmondville Central School District.

== Geography ==
According to the United States Census Bureau, the town has a total area of 30.2 square miles (78.3 km^{2}), of which 30.2 square miles (78.2 km^{2}) is land and 0.04 square mile (0.1 km^{2}) (0.10%) is water. Elevations within Richmondville range from 920 feet along the Cobleskill-Richmondville boundary at Cobleskill Creek to 2,160 feet near the junction of Cross Hill Road and Dodge Lodge Road in the southeastern corner of the town.

Interstate 88 passes across the town. Before the construction of I-88, New York State Route 10 was a north-south highway into the village of Richmondville. Now NYS Rt 10 bypasses the village to the east and intersects NYS RT 7 at an interchange with I-88. New York State Route 7 runs concurrently with NY-10 through part of Richmondville.

The western town line is the border of Otsego County.

== Demographics ==
Historical population
Census	Pop.	Note	%±
1850	1,666		—
1860	2,023		21.4%
1870	2,307		14.0%
1880	2,082		−9.8%
1890	1,917		−7.9%
1900	1,719		−10.3%
1910	1,430		−16.8%
1920	1,378		−3.6%
1930	1,463		6.2%
1940	1,503		2.7%
1950	1,728		15.0%
1960	1,746		1.0%
1970	1,903		9.0%
1980	2,186		14.9%
1990	2,397		9.7%
2000	2,412		0.6%
2010	2,610		8.2%
2020	2,466		−5.5%
U.S. Decennial Census

As of the census of 2000, there were 2,412 people, 968 households, and 686 families residing in the town. The population density was 79.9 inhabitants per square mile (30.8/km^{2}). There were 1,141 housing units at an average density of 37.8 per square mile (14.6/km^{2}). The racial makeup of the town was 96.81% White, 0.70% Black or African American, 0.50% Native American, 0.50% Asian, 0.83% from other races, and 0.66% from two or more races. Hispanic or Latino of any race were 1.58% of the population.

There were 968 households, out of which 32.3% had children under the age of 18 living with them, 54.8% were married couples living together, 11.7% had a female householder with no husband present, and 29.1% were non-families. 23.6% of all households were made up of individuals, and 9.3% had someone living alone who was 65 years of age or older. The average household size was 2.49 and the average family size was 2.93.

In the town, the population was spread out, with 26.0% under the age of 18, 7.0% from 18 to 24, 29.0% from 25 to 44, 22.8% from 45 to 64, and 15.2% who were 65 years of age or older. The median age was 37 years. For every 100 females, there were 103.0 males. For every 100 females age 18 and over, there were 94.9 males.

The median income for a household in the town was $34,761, and the median income for a family was $38,466. Males had a median income of $30,466 versus $22,738 for females. The per capita income for the town was $17,188. About 5.5% of families and 8.2% of the population were below the poverty line, including 8.6% of those under age 18 and 3.7% of those age 65 or over.

== Communities and locations in the Town of Richmondville ==
- Bear Gulch – A valley south of Richmondville village.
- Beards Hollow – A hamlet south of Richmondville village, located at the southern town line on County Road 23. It is located in a valley, also called Beards Hollow. Access to Old Beards Hollow is via Beards Hollow Road. This historic community was anchored by a church that still stands. Beards Hollow road connects to NYS Rt 10, south of the village of Summit while the eastern end of this road starts at NYS RT7 east of the village of Richmondville.
- Brooker Hollow – The Terpenning–Johnson House and Cemetery was listed on the National Register of Historic Places in 2012.
- Richmondville – The Village of Richmondville is in the central part of the town on NY-10 by the Interstate.
- Warnerville – A hamlet in the northeastern part of the town on NY-10, named after an early settler family. It was also called "Manns Valley."
- West Richmondville – A hamlet in the western part of the town, located on NY-7 by the Interstate. It was formerly called "Caryleville."
