= Seward, New York =

- Town
- Location in Schoharie County and the state of New York.
- Coordinates: 42°42′26″N 74°34′58″W
- Country: United States
- State: New York
- County: Schoharie

Area
  - Total: 36.46 sq mi (94.42 km^{2})
  - Land: 36.38 sq mi (94.22 km^{2})
  - Water: 0.081 sq mi (0.21 km^{2})
- Elevation: 1,158 ft (353 m)

Population (2020)
  - Total: 1,583
- Time zone: UTC-5 (Eastern (EST))
  - Summer (DST): UTC-4 (EDT)
- ZIP code: 12043
- Area code: 518
- FIPS code: 36-66542
- GNIS feature ID: 0979483
- Website: Town website

Seward is a town in Schoharie County, New York, United States. The population was 1,583 at the 2020 census. The town is named after senator, governor, and secretary of state William H. Seward.

The Town of Seward is in the northwestern part of the county and is northeast of Oneonta.

== History ==
The first settlement took place circa 1754 near Seward village.

During the American Revolution, much of the town was destroyed due to conflict between loyalist and revolutionary factions.

The town was formed in 1840 from part of the Town of Sharon.

== Geography ==
According to the United States Census Bureau, the town has a total area of 36.5 square miles (95 km^{2}), of which 36.4 square miles (94 km^{2}) is land and 0.1 square miles (0.26 km^{2}) (0.19%) is water.

The western town line is the border of Otsego County.

New York State Route 10 is a north–south highway. New York State Route 165 is an east–west highway, with its eastern terminus at NY-10 at Janesville. New York State Route 145 is a north–south highway in the northeastern part of Seward.

== Demographics ==
Historical population
Census	Pop.	Note	%±
1840	2,088		—
1850	2,203		5.5%
1860	1,948		−11.6%
1870	1,765		−9.4%
1880	1,734		−1.8%
1890	1,626		−6.2%
1900	1,404		−13.7%
1910	1,419		1.1%
1920	1,193		−15.9%
1930	1,128		−5.4%
1940	1,146		1.6%
1950	1,224		6.8%
1960	1,210		−1.1%
1970	1,271		5.0%
1980	1,587		24.9%
1990	1,651		4.0%
2000	1,637		−0.8%
2010	1,763		7.7%
2020	1,583		−10.2%
U.S. Decennial Census

As of the census of 2000, there were 1,637 people, 588 households, and 449 families residing in the town. The population density was (25.0/sq mi). There were 683 housing units at an average density of 18.8 per square mile (7.3/km^{2}). The racial makeup of the town was 97.50% White, 0.31% African American, 0.18% Native American, 0.06% Pacific Islander, 0.73% from other races, and 1.22% from two or more races. Hispanic or Latino of any race were 2.75% of the population.

There were 588 households, out of which 40.0% had children under the age of 18 living with them, 62.1% were married couples living together, 8.8% had a female householder with no husband present, and 23.6% were non-families. 19.7% of all households were made up of individuals, and 9.2% had someone living alone who was 65 years of age or older. The average household size was 2.78 and the average family size was 3.16.

In the town, the population was spread out, with 29.6% under the age of 18, 5.9% from 18 to 24, 26.7% from 25 to 44, 24.6% from 45 to 64, and 13.3% who were 65 years of age or older. The median age was 38 years. For every 100 females, there were 102.6 males. For every 100 females age 18 and over, there were 101.4 males.

The median income for a household in the town was $40,438, and the median income for a family was $44,813. Males had a median income of $31,827 versus $24,076 for females. The per capita income for the town was $18,227. About 5.9% of families and 8.8% of the population were below the poverty line, including 11.4% of those under age 18 and 3.5% of those age 65 or over.

== Communities and locations in Seward ==
- Clove – A hamlet in the southeastern part of the town, on County Road 63. It was once called "The Clove," a corruption of the Dutch "Klauver Kloof," meaning "clover valley."
- Dorloo – A hamlet in the western section of the town on NY-165, west of Seward village.
- Gardnersville – A hamlet east of Seward village, located on NY-10 and named after Dow Gardner, an early settler.
- Hyndsville – A hamlet on NY-10 in the southeastern part of the town named after a settler family.
- Janesville – A hamlet on NY-10 in the southeastern part of the town.
- Lawyersville – A hamlet at the eastern town line on NY-145, named after an early family.
- Seward – The hamlet of Seward is in the northern section of the town on NY-165.
- Webers Corners – A hamlet by the western town line on NY-165.
- Zeh Corners – A hamlet in the northeastern part of the town on County Road 30.
