= Milford (village), New York =

Milford, New York
- Village
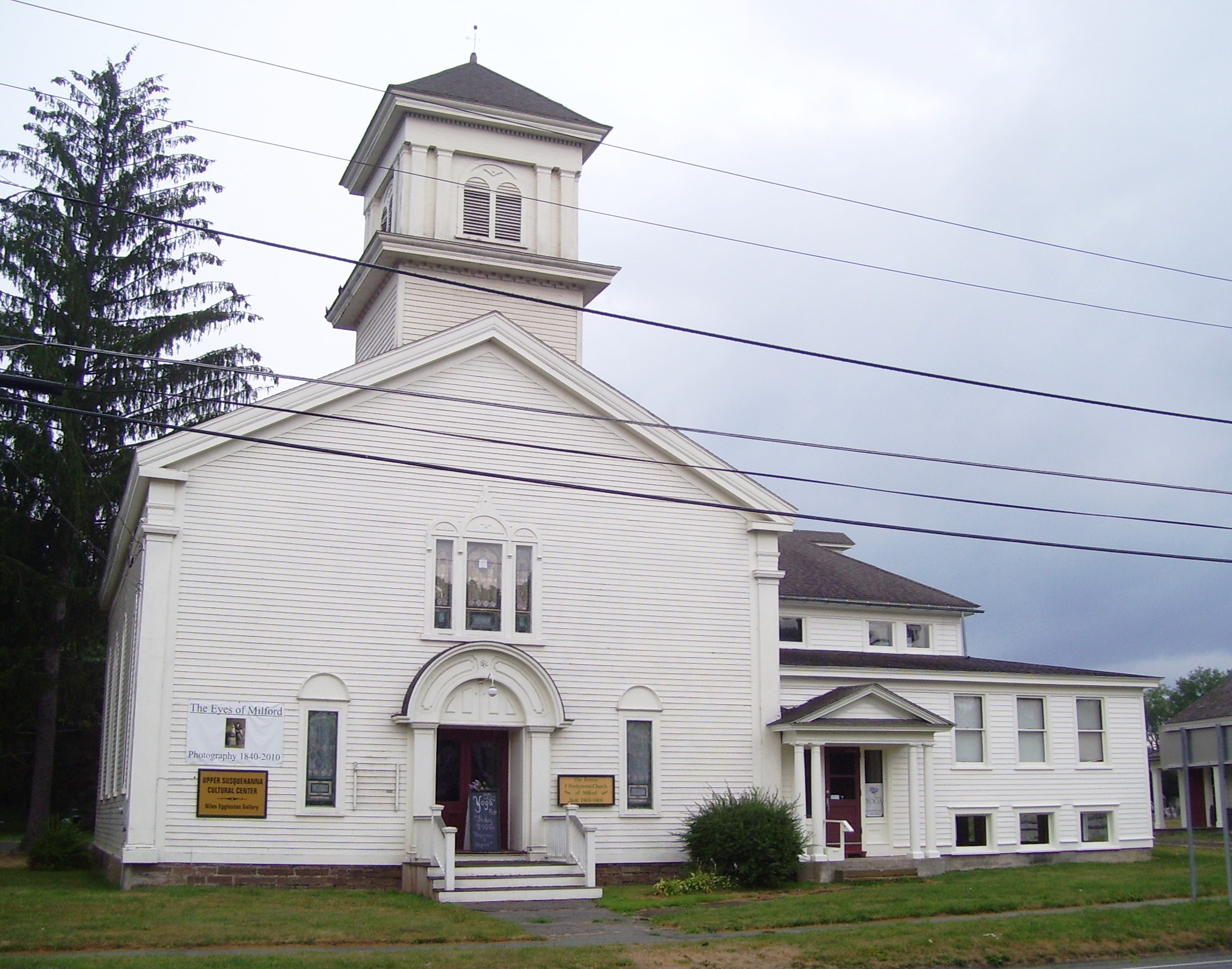
- The Upper Susquehanna Cultural Center, formerly the Presbyterian Church of Milford (2012)

- Logo

- Location within the state of New York
- Coordinates: 42°35′24″N 74°56′49″W
- Country: United States
- State: New York
- County: Otsego
- Town: Milford

Government
  - Mayor: Brian Pokorny

Area
  - Total: 0.42 sq mi (1.10 km^{2})
  - Land: 0.42 sq mi (1.10 km^{2})
  - Water: 0 sq mi (0.00 km^{2})
- Elevation: 1,207 ft (368 m)

Population (2020)
  - Total: 367
  - Density: 870/sq mi (334/km^{2})
- Time zone: UTC-5 (Eastern (EST))
  - Summer (DST): UTC-4 (EDT)
- ZIP code: 13807
- Area code: 607
- FIPS code: 36-47229
- GNIS feature ID: 0957183
- Website: villagemilford.digitaltowpath.org:10796/content

The Village of Milford is a village in the northeastern part of the Town of Milford, in Otsego County, New York, United States. It is located northeast of Oneonta. As of the 2010 census, the village had a population of 415.

== Geography ==
According to the United States Census Bureau, the village has a total area of 0.5 square mile (1.2 km^{2}), all land.

The village is located on New York State Route 28 (North Main Street and South Main Street) at the intersection of New York State Route 166 (East Main Street) and County Highway 44 (West Main Street). NY 166 has its western terminus at this intersection.

== Demographics ==
Historical population
Census	Pop.	Note	%±
1880	557		—
1900	532		—
1910	511		−3.9%
1920	505		−1.2%
1930	491		−2.8%
1940	460		−6.3%
1950	502		9.1%
1960	548		9.2%
1970	527		−3.8%
1980	514		−2.5%
1990	462		−10.1%
2000	511		10.6%
2010	415		−18.8%
2020	367		−11.6%
U.S. Decennial Census

As of the census of 2000, there were 511 people, 198 households, and 143 families residing in the village. The population density was 1,071.2 inhabitants per square mile (413.6/km^{2}). There were 232 housing units at an average density of 486.4/sq mi (187.8/km^{2}). The racial makeup of the village was 96.67% White, 0.20% Black or African American, 0.59% Native American, 0.98% Asian, and 1.57% from two or more races. Hispanic or Latino of any race were 2.15% of the population.

There were 198 households, out of which 37.4% had children under the age of 18 living with them, 48.0% were married couples living together, 18.2% had a female householder with no husband present, and 27.3% were non-families. 20.7% of all households were made up of individuals, and 9.1% had someone living alone who was 65 years of age or older. The average household size was 2.56 and the average family size was 2.90.

In the village, the population was spread out, with 27.0% under the age of 18, 6.7% from 18 to 24, 27.0% from 25 to 44, 26.4% from 45 to 64, and 12.9% who were 65 years of age or older. The median age was 39 years. For every 100 females, there were 92.1 males. For every 100 females age 18 and over, there were 92.3 males.

The median income for a household in the village was $43,594, and the median income for a family was $45,375. Males had a median income of $25,417 versus $21,518 for females. The per capita income for the village was $17,282. About 3.6% of families and 7.1% of the population were below the poverty line, including 5.9% of those under age 18 and 6.9% of those age 65 or over.
