= Westford =

Westford may refer to:

== Places in the United States ==
- Westford, Connecticut
- Westford, Massachusetts
- Westford, New York
  - Westford (CDP), New York
- Westford, Vermont
  - Westford (CDP), Vermont
- Westmore, Vermont, originally chartered as "Westford"
- Westford, Wisconsin (disambiguation)

== Ships ==
- SS Westford, formerly SS Empire Baxter

== See also ==
- West Ford (c. 1784 – 1863), caretaker and manager of Mount Vernon
