= Westford (CDP), New York =

Westford, New York
- Census-designated place
- Location within New York Location within the United States
- Coordinates: 42°39′1″N 74°47′50″W
- Country: United States
- State: New York
- County: Otsego
- Town: Westford

Area
  - Total: 1.64 sq mi (4.26 km^{2})
  - Land: 1.64 sq mi (4.26 km^{2})
  - Water: 0 sq mi (0.00 km^{2})
- Elevation: 1,563 ft (476 m)

Population (2020)
  - Total: 145
  - Density: 88.2/sq mi (34.04/km^{2})
- Time zone: UTC-5 (Eastern (EST))
  - Summer (DST): UTC-4 (EDT)
- ZIP Codes: 12155 (Schenevus); 12197 (Worcester)
- Area code: 607
- FIPS code: 36-79961
- GNIS feature ID: 2804625

Westford is a census-designated place (CDP) and the primary hamlet in the town of Westford, Otsego County, New York, United States. It was first listed as a CDP prior to the 2020 census.

The community is in eastern Otsego County, slightly north of the center of the town of Westford. It is in the valley of Elk Creek, 8 miles (13 km) north of Schenevus, 6 miles (10 km) northwest of Worcester, and 10 miles (16 km) by road southeast of Cooperstown.

== Demographics ==
Historical population
| Census | Pop. | Note | %± |
|---|---|---|---|
| 2020 | 145 | | — |
U.S. Decennial Census
