= East Worcester, New York =

- Census-designated place
- Location within New York Location within the United States
- Coordinates: 42°37′24″N 74°40′17″W
- Country: United States
- State: New York
- County: Otsego
- Town: Worcester

Area
  - Total: 2.51 sq mi (6.51 km^{2})
  - Land: 2.51 sq mi (6.51 km^{2})
  - Water: 0 sq mi (0.00 km^{2})
- Elevation: 1,467 ft (447 m)

Population (2020)
  - Total: 327
  - Density: 130.1/sq mi (50.22/km^{2})
- Time zone: UTC-5 (Eastern (EST))
  - Summer (DST): UTC-4 (EDT)
- ZIP Code: 12064
- Area code: 607
- FIPS code: 36-23283
- GNIS feature ID: 2804335

East Worcester is a hamlet and census-designated place (CDP) in the town of Worcester in Otsego County, New York, United States. It was first listed as a CDP prior to the 2020 census. As of the 2020 census, East Worcester had a population of 327.

East Worcester is in eastern Otsego County, in the northeast part of the town of Worcester. It is bordered to the north by the town of Decatur and to the southeast by Interstate 88. New York State Route 7 is East Worcester's Main Street. Access to I-88 is either from Exit 19 in Worcester hamlet, 4 miles (6 km) to the southwest along Route 7, or from Exit 20 in Richmondville, 7 miles (11 km) to the east, also via Route 7.

East Worcester is in the valley of Schenevus Creek where it is joined from the north by Oak Creek. Schenevus Creek rises less than 3 miles (5 km) to the northeast and flows southwest to join the Susquehanna River at Colliersville. I-88 and State Route 7 follow the creek valley for its entire distance.

== Demographics ==
Historical population
Census	Pop.	Note	%±
2020	327		—
U.S. Decennial Census
