= Palmer Creek (New York) =

Stream in Otsego County, New York, US

Location
- Country: United States
- State: New York
- Region: Central New York Region

Physical characteristics
- Source
  - coordinates: 42°36′44″N 74°47′41″W
- Mouth: Schenevus Creek
  - location: ENE of Schenevus, New York, United States
  - coordinates: 42°33′43″N 74°47′05″W
  - elevation: 1,243 ft (379 m)

Palmer Creek is a creek that flows into Schenevus Creek east-northeast of Schenevus, New York.
