= Schenevus Creek =

- Location of the mouth in New York

Location
- Country: United States
- State: New York
- Region: Otsego County

Physical characteristics
- Source
  - location: West Richmondville, New York
- Mouth: Susquehanna River
  - location: Colliersville, New York
  - coordinates: 42°29′07″N 74°59′00″W
- Basin size: 119 sq mi (310 km^{2})

Basin features
- Tributaries
  - left: Hudson Lake, Seward Lake
  - right: Oak Creek, Decatur Creek, Palmer Creek, Sparrowhawk Brook, Elk Creek, Whitney Brook, Morehouse Brook, Potato Creek

The Schenevus Creek is a river located in southern Otsego County, New York. The creek flows through Worcester and Schenevus before converging with the Susquehanna River in Colliersville, New York.
