= Abraham Garfield =

American farmer who was the father of U.S. president James A. Garfield (1799–1833)

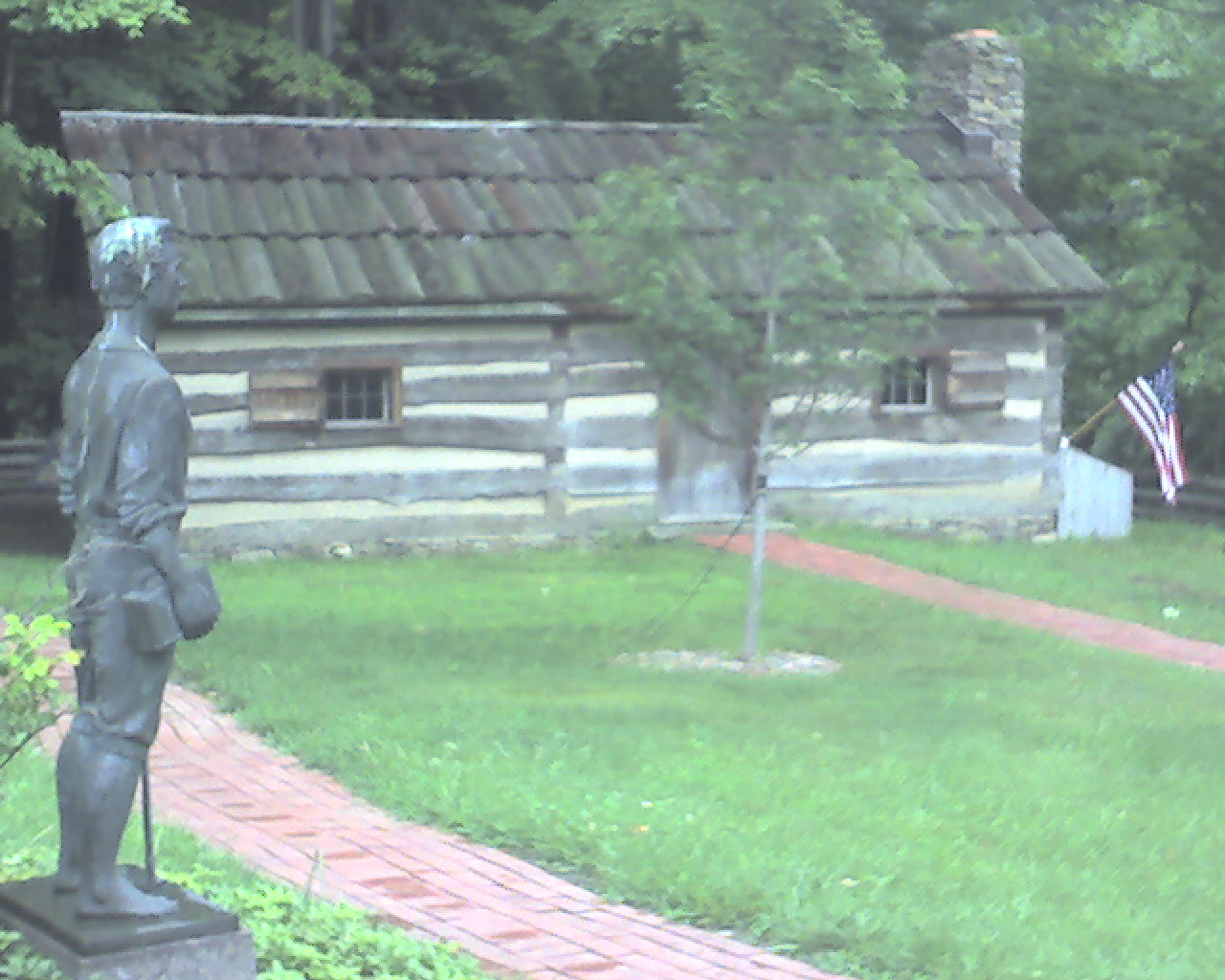
- Abram Garfield's house in 2006
- Born: December 28, 1799; Worcester, Otsego, New York
- Died: May 8, 1833 (aged 33); Orange Township, Cuyahoga, Ohio
- Other name: Abram Garfield
- Spouse: Eliza Ballou (m. 1820)
- Children: Mehetabel (1821–1911), Thomas (1822–1910), Mary (1824–1884), James Ballou (1826–1829) and James Garfield (1831–1881)

Abraham Garfield (December 28, 1799 – May 8, 1833) was an American farmer and father of the 20th U.S. president, James A. Garfield.

== Biography ==
Garfield was born in New York to Thomas Garfield (1773–1801) and Asenath Cynthia Hill (1778–1851). On February 3, 1820, when he was 20 years old, he married Eliza Ballou, a New Hampshire woman of Huguenot descent. The couple moved to Cuyahoga, Ohio and had five children: Mehetabel (1821–1911), Thomas (1822–1910), Mary (1824–1884), James Ballou (1826–1829), and James Abram (1831–1881). In Cuyahoga, Abram worked on a farm belonging to "Uncle Jerdiah" Hubbell, who often made him do minor jobs such as repair a fence or build a canal (which he finished in October 1827). In January 1833, Abram and Eliza Garfield joined a Stone-Campbell church, a decision that influenced their youngest son's life. On May 8, 1833, Abram died in his wife's arms after battling with a sickness.

== Physical description ==
On March 31, 1870, Eliza wrote to her son James Garfield about his genealogy and said that Abraham was 5 ft 11 inches, "fluent in politics", a zealous Christian, "had a tolerably quick temper but he could govern it well", cheerful, kind, a writer but not good at spelling, and a "good wrestler".
