= Decatur Creek =

Creek in Worcester, New York, United States

Decatur Creek Parker Creek

Location
- Country: United States
- State: New York
- Region: Central New York Region

Physical characteristics
- Source
  - coordinates: 42°40′44″N 74°44′10″W
- Mouth: Schenevus Creek
  - location: Worcester, New York, United States
  - coordinates: 42°35′12″N 74°45′13″W
  - elevation: 1,296 ft (395 m)

Decatur Creek is a creek that flows into Schenevus Creek in Worcester, New York. Decatur Creek was formally called Parker Creek.
