= Potato Creek =

Potato Creek may refer to:

- Potato Creek (Flint River tributary), a creek in Georgia
- Potato Creek (Schenevus Creek tributary), a creek in New York
- Potato Creek (Pennsylvania), a stream in Pennsylvania
- Potato Creek (White River), a stream in South Dakota
- Potato Creek, South Dakota, an unincorporated community
- Potato Creek State Park, a state park in Indiana

== See also ==
- Potato River (disambiguation)
