= 1st Massachusetts Infantry Regiment =

1st Regiment Massachusetts Volunteer Infantry
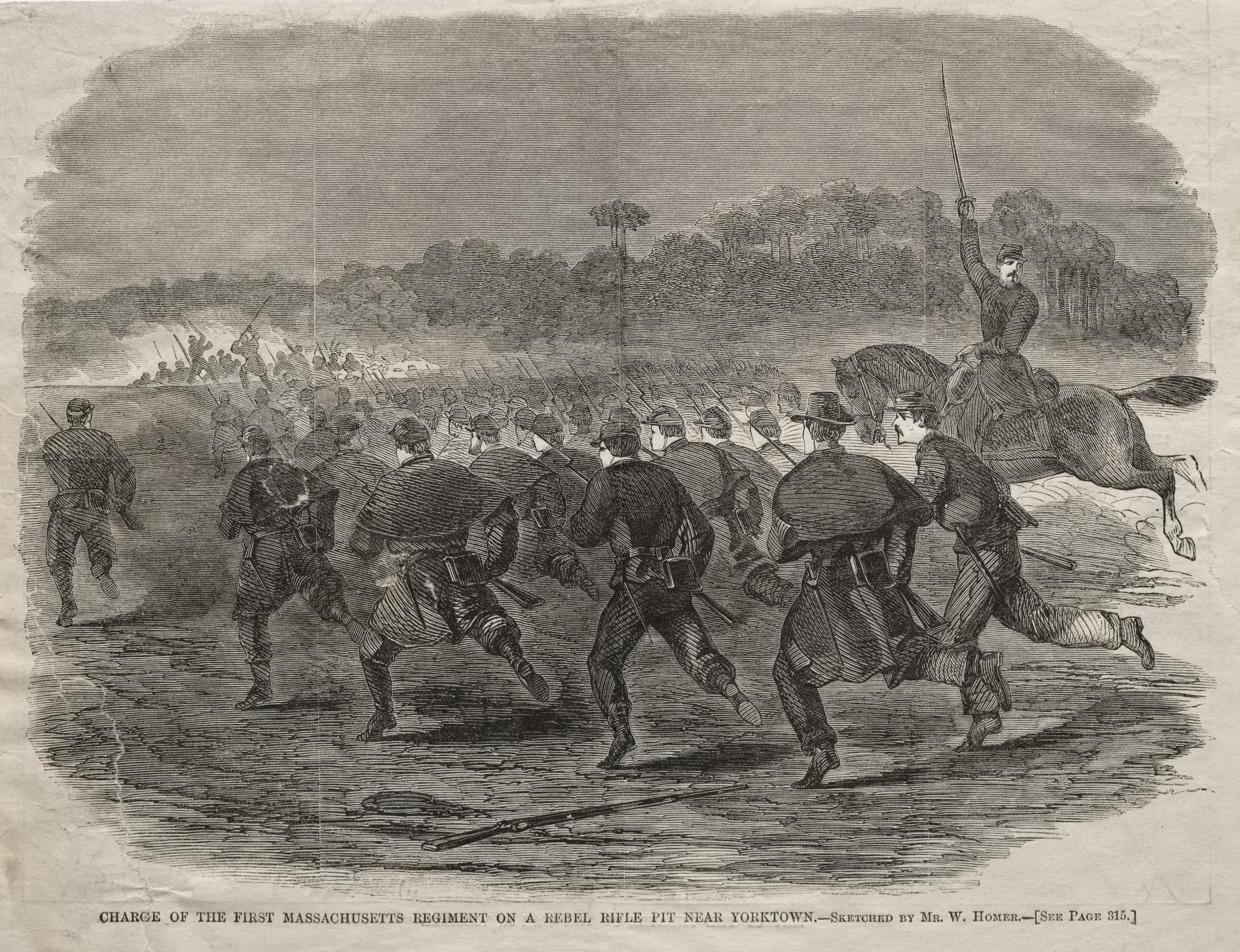
- "Charge of the First Massachusetts Regiment on a Rebel Rifle Pit near Yorktown," by Winslow Homer, 1862
- Active: May 23, 1861–May 25, 1864
- Country: United States of America
- Branch: Union Army
- Type: Infantry
- Part of: In 1863: 1st Brigade (Carr's), 2nd Division (Humphreys's), III Corps, Army of the Potomac
- Battle honours: Battle of Blackburn's Ford; First Battle of Bull Run; Siege of Yorktown; Battle of Williamsburg; Battle of Seven Pines; Battle of Glendale; Second Battle of Bull Run; Battle of Fredericksburg; Battle of Chancellorsville; Battle of Gettysburg; Battle of Mine Run; Battle of the Wilderness; Battle of Spotsylvania Court House

Commanders
- Notable commanders: Col. Robert Cowdin; Col. Napoleon B. McLaughlen

Insignia
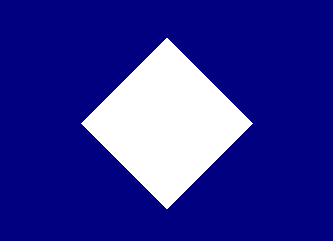
- III Corps (2nd Division) badge

The 1st Regiment Massachusetts Volunteer Infantry was an infantry regiment in the Union army during the American Civil War. It was the first regiment to leave Massachusetts for a three-year term (several had previously left for 90-day terms) in response to President Abraham Lincoln's May 3, 1861, call for three-year regiments. It was also the first three-year regiment from any state to reach Washington, D.C., for federal service. The core of the regiment was five companies from the 1st Massachusetts Volunteer Militia, a peace-time unit which was formed in 1858, replacing an earlier, disbanded unit of the same designation. Five companies of new recruits were added to the regiment and the unit was mustered in by companies beginning May 23, 1861, at Camp Cameron in Cambridge, Massachusetts.

After arriving in Washington, the regiment became part of Major General Irwin McDowell's Army of Northeastern Virginia and saw their first combat during the Battle of Blackburn's Ford. The 1st Massachusetts was engaged during the First Battle of Bull Run. When Union forces surrounding Washington were reorganized, the regiment became part of the Army of the Potomac, with which it was associated for the rest of its term of service. It was involved in the Peninsular Campaign and was present for virtually all of the major battles in which the Army of the Potomac fought, including the Second Battle of Bull Run, the Battle of Fredericksburg, the Battle of Chancellorsville, the Battle of Gettysburg and Lieutenant General Ulysses Grant's Overland Campaign.

== Organization ==
At the start of the war, with the firing on Fort Sumter, the 1st Massachusetts Volunteer Militia consisted of five companies based in and around Boston, Massachusetts. The peace-time unit of militia was organized in 1858 not long after an older unit of the same name disbanded. The regiment was initially built around five companies (later companies, D, E, F, and G) of the First Regiment Massachusetts Volunteer Militia. These five companies were the "Union Guards" of East Boston (B), the "Roxbury City Guards" of Roxbury (D), the "Pulaski Guards" of South Boston (E), the "National Guards" of Boston (F), and the "Independent Boston Fusiliers" (G). The commanding officer, Colonel Robert Cowdin, originally offered their service in response to Lincoln's first call for 75,000 volunteers to serve a term of 90-days. But as the unit did not yet have the ten companies required for a regiment, the request was set aside. (Note: Immediately after the fall of Ft. Sumter, when the Capital seemed in imminent danger, Cowdin and a number of other militia Colonels reported to Governor Andrew. Cowdin immediately offered to one of his militia companies which was accepted. This company, with others that had previously been ordered, made a full regiment, and left for Washington, April 17, 1861. Although, on paper, Cowdin's regiment would retain the ordinal designation of its militia core, Andrews sent out the Regiments as soon as they were fully staffed, ergo, the 3rd, 5th, and 8th Massachusetts volunteers left before the 1st.) The state the added five other militia companies in part or as a whole to fill the complement of ten companies as A, C, H, I, and K. A was drawn from the two militia companies in Brookline, C from the North End True Blues in Boston, H from the Chelsea Volunteers in Chelsea, I from the Schouler Guards in Boston, and K from the Chadwick Light Infantry of Roxbury.

The regiment first made its headquarters at Faneuil Hall in Boston and began recruiting volunteers for five new companies. This progressed for about a month until a full complement of companies was reached. When Lincoln's call for three-year regiments was issued on May 3, 1861, the men of the 1st Massachusetts unanimously agreed to serve for that term. The first four companies were mustered into federal service on May 23 and the remaining six over the next few days. On May 25, the regiment was ordered to occupy an improvised training camp outside of Boston dubbed Camp Ellsworth. The barracks were located in an old ice house next to Fresh Pond in North Cambridge, Massachusetts. (Note: It was named Camp Ellsworth, in honor of the gallant colonel of the New York Fire Zouaves, whose murder by the secessionist Jackson, at the Marshall House, Alexandria, Va., on the morning of May 24, was still fresh in the public mind.) The regiment began active training and drilling here, however, the camp and barracks turned out to be unsuitable and unhealthy, resulting a growing sick list. On June 13, the unit moved to a different location in North Cambridge where new barracks were constructed. (Note: Cowdin also found the condition of the arms and equipment drawn from the Watertown Arsenal to be in poor condition and the regiment spent a lot of its time in camp repairing its arms, uniforms, and equipment to suitable condition for field service) This came to be known as Camp Cameron. Just two days later, the War Department summoned the regiment to active service.

== Initial service in 1861 ==
The 1st Massachusetts left Boston on the Boston and Providence Railroad in seventeen passenger and four baggage cars, drawn by two locomotives. Arriving in Groton, Connecticut, the regiment detrained and embarked on the steamship Commonwealth It sailed out and south outside Long Island and landed in Jersey City where the men disembarked and, after a meal, again entrained, this time on the New Jersey Railroad, for Washington. Since the Baltimore riot two months earlier when the 6th Massachusetts was attacked by a large crowd of civilian Confederate sympathizers, new Union regiments headed southward generally avoided passing through that city. Col. Cowdin decided to travel through Baltimore which required the regiment to march on foot between two of the city's train depots as the 6th Massachusetts had done. The men of the 1st Massachusetts were ordered to load their muskets before conducting the march. A large crowd of civilians assembled but remained silent as the 1st Massachusetts passed. After boarding train cars without incident, the regiment arrived in Washington on the evening of June 17. It was the first of the three-year regiments to reach the capital.

On June 19, the regiment marched through Washington and Georgetown and established a camp on the north side of the Potomac River which they called Camp Banks. (Note: Named after the politician and Massachusetts resident, Nathaniel P. Banks) The 1st Massachusetts spent nearly a month there, drilling and preparing for the upcoming campaign. The men shared an opinion with the other New England troops that the further they traveled south,there was an increase in travelers' discomforts and inconveniences, poorer living, exorbitant charges at accommodations, indifference to human comfort, and disregard of human life and happiness. This seemed to feed the very dim view they of the local white population who they saw as overtly or covertly supportive of secession.

As a result, strict military discipline was enforced. The men were learning to be soldiers with a tight schedule of instruction, physical training, and inspections. They were attached to the Fourth Brigade (commanded by Col. Israel B. Richardson) of the First Division (commanded by Brigadier General Daniel Tyler) of Maj. Gen. Irwin McDowell's Army of Northeastern Virginia. As part of their brigade, the regiment soon took up its part in patrolling and protecting portions of the Washington Aqueduct.

=== First Bull Run Campaign ===
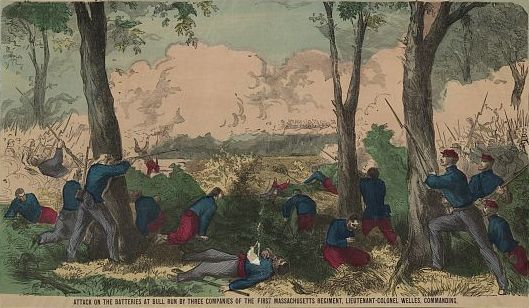
"Attack on the batteries at Bull Run by three companies of the First Massachusetts Regiment, Lieutenant-Colonel Welles, commanding"

On Tuesday, July 16, the regiment received orders to march with their brigade into Virginia as Gen. McDowell commenced to move his army to meet the Confederate forces gathered around the important railroad junction at Manassas, Virginia. At 3:00 p.m., the 1st, in company with the 2nd and 3rd Michigan and the 12th New York Regiments, constituting Col. Richardson's brigade, crossed the Potomac via the Chain Bridge into Virginia, and began a march towards Vienna. The men noted the support of local Unionists as the marched and reached their bivouac at 11:00 p.m. Throughout Tuesday and Wednesday, the regiment saw evidence of the rebel army in trees felled as obstacles across the road and various pieces of clothing and equipment left along the road side.

==== Battle of Blackburn's Ford ====
Thursday, July 18, Tyler's division was ordered to probe the Confederate position on the other side of Bull Run. Richardson's brigade led the reconnaissance-in-force known as the Battle of Blackburn's Ford during which the 1st Massachusetts acted as the leading regiment of the brigade by Col. Cowdin's request. As they started off at 7:00 a.m., the heat was extremely oppressive, and water was scarce, and the 1st turned left from Centreville down the road leading down to Blackburn's Ford across Bull Run, a tributary of the Occoquan River. Its banks were covered with a dense undergrowth of bushes and thickets. Either side of Bull Run was peculiarly well adapted to defensive warfare, with a gentle slope downs to the water, which had carved a deep chasm thus forming a barrier to cavalry and artillery. The men of the regiment noted that the road to the ford ran apparently through a farm or plantation, with a house, barn, outbuildings, and orchard on the left, and a large wheat-field on the right. Around 11:00 a.m., the men saw rebel pickets in thick woods along Bull Run, who withdrew as the brigade approached. The 1st was wearing their gray Massachusetts militia uniforms (the typical color for many state militia units). This caused considerable confusion for both Confederate and Union units that encountered the regiment later that day and might have confused the pickets.

The brigade's skirmishers advanced half-way down the hill to make observations and, across Bull Run, they saw rebel infantry in numerous cleared spots and around certain buildings, interspersed here and there by cavalry, but no artillery. Richardson immediately ordered up his artillery, and the rest of his regiments. The first battery was posted in the wheat field fired twelve or fifteen shots before rebel batteries replied with four or five rounds of accurate fire. When the second battery arrived, and was posted by the orchard, it fired on the enemy's batteries who ceased firing after four rounds.

When the full brigade arrived, it deployed athwart the road with the 1st Massachusetts on the left. Richardson directed the 1st Massachusetts to hold the farm and its buildings, the ravine to its front, and along its fence and walls. Two companies pushed into the woods along Bull Run and made contact almost immediately who opened fire but seemed only to prevent the crossing of Bull Run and not advance themselves. (Note: The men of the regiment noted a couple men from the 11th New York, Ellsworth's Fire Zouaves, who eager to fight had left their regiment, at least six miles behind, and joined the advancing troops being among the first to enter the woods. Subject to no orders, they roamed about at will, doing well and picking off several of the enemy's forces.) Another company took the house and barn on the left and followed the skirmishers into the woods. Once again, confusion over the regiment's uniforms made it difficult to identify friendly soldiers from the rebels. (Note: From Cudworth:"Lieut. William H. B. Smith discovered the enemy, as he supposed; but seeing how they were attired, and fearing to give the order to fire, lest he might shoot some of our own men, he ran forward, exclaiming, "Who are you?" The rebels replied with the same question, "Who are you?" when Lieut. Smith incautiously responded, "Massachusetts men;" and no sooner had the words left his mouth than the rebels replied with a volley which laid him dead upon the spot.") Eventually, they crossed Bull Run, and three companies of the 1st Massachusetts were ordered forward as skirmishers to probe the Confederate position. (Note: Again, their gray uniforms caused another moment of confusion as they were almost fired on by These two companies took the brunt of the unit's casualties during the engagement, although the entire regiment was exposed to heavy fire. The 1st Massachusetts found that the Confederates were present in force on the other side of Blackburn's Ford and had a strong position. Tyler ordered a complete withdrawal. Any attempt to flank the Confederate position by Blackburn's Ford was thereafter lost.)

That night the regiment returned to Centerville for its bivouac. At Blackburn's Ford, its first taste of battle, the 1st Massachusetts lost 13 killed, including 2nd Lieut. William H. B. Smith of Cambridge, and over 20 wounded and missing. On Friday, the next day, it returned the ford to man a picket line at Bull Run for through to Sunday, July 21.

==== First Battle of Bull Run ====
Due to the failure of the reconnaissance at Blackburn's Ford, McDowell determined that a frontal assault on the Confederate lines across Bull Run would be necessary. The result was the First Battle of Bull Run fought on July 21. During the battle, the 1st Massachusetts and their brigade were posted at Blackburn's Ford to hold the crossing and to make demonstrations, or lightly engage, the forces on the other side of the ford to prevent them from reinforcing the rest of the Confederate line. The 1st Massachusetts, relatively sheltered in woods near the ford, waited for hours while the main action played out several miles to their northwest, upstream along Bull Run. In their position, mail and rations had been brought forward, and it seemed everything was going in the Union's favor. Various bodies of rebel troops could be seen gathering in the 1st's front and on the left. The men had strengthened their position with a parapet of earth and an abbatis extending several hundred feet to the right and left. Skirmishers in the woods soon fell back to the regiment reporting large numbers of rebels.

When the main Union force retreated in extreme disorder, the Confederate troops at Blackburn's Ford advanced to attack. The 1st Massachusetts resisted this advance for a short time, returning fire from their fortified position driving the rebels back into the protection of the woods. During this action, the regiment suffered its only casualties of the battle including 2nd Lt. ELijah B. Gill of Company I who had been holding the farmhouse. Soon, however, an order came for them to immediately retire. Having no knowledge of the general retreat, this order came as a surprise to the regiment. Realizing the battle was lost, McDowell had ordered Richardson to withdraw and cover the retreat from Centreville. They marched northward towards Centreville but did not join in the general retreat. Instead they halted and bivouacked just in the rear of the artillery, buried Lt Gill, and rested until orders came near midnight to march for Washington. Theirs was the last Union brigade to leave the field. The 1st Massachusetts and its mates covered the army and reached Arlington about 4:00 p.m. on Monday, July 22 having been so far in rear that no other troops of McDowell's army were in sight.

=== Defense of Washington and Maryland ===
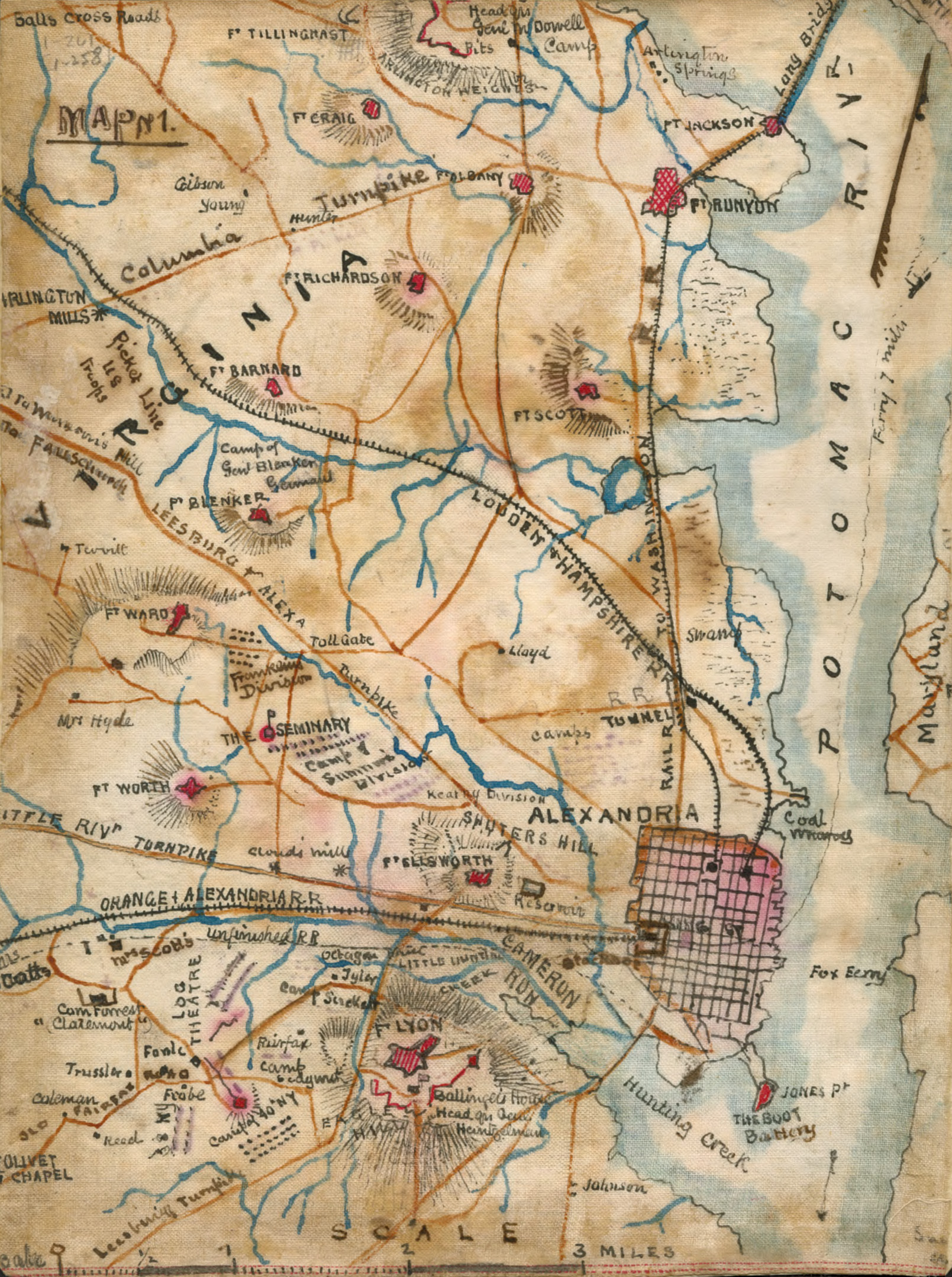
Map of Civil War forts near Alexandria, showing Fort Albany (ca. September 1861)

The Union command and public opinion feared that the 14,000 Confederate troops who had not fought in the battle would advance on the capital. As a result, the 1st Massachusetts and its brigade were withdrawn all the way back to the city and went back into Camp Banks. The Northern public was shocked at the unexpected defeat of their army when an easy victory had been widely anticipated, and both sides quickly came to realize that the war would be longer and more brutal than they had imagined. On July 22, President Lincoln signed a bill that provided for the enlistment of another 500,000 men for up to three years of service. Soon, the immediate threat of an attack abated.

On July 26, George B. McClellan was appointed commander of the Military Division of the Potomac, the main Union force responsible for the defense of Washington. On August 20, he formed the Army of the Potomac (AoP), with himself as its first commander. This Army became the primary force in the Union army in the Eastern Theatre that protected the Capital and the North.

A strategic threat remained and the United States continued building extensive fortifications to protect Washington from the rebels. On the hills surrounding the capital, across the Potomac in northern Virginia, and on the Potomac Approaches, the U.S. government built a complex system of Civil War fortifications. This system, as projected, was to be connected by unbroken lines of rifle-pits, covered ways, and breastworks to shield infantry. The forts were all located on the highest hills surrounding the city of Alexandria and the District of Columbia, and were constructed of earth, timber, and some masonry, in the most thorough and careful manner. These strategic buttresses transformed the young capital into one of the world's most fortified cities. To man these defenses, the U.S. Army amassed an army of troops as big as any of its field armies. (Note: The forts contained veils, bomb-proofs, and magazines; were surrounded with ditches, fringed and planted with abatis of sharp pointed branches; and mounted variously a dozen, fifteen, twenty, or more guns, of every caliber. To give these guns the widest possible range, forest-trees, proves, and orchards were levelled with the ground all around them; and, in some instances, houses and barns torn down or removed. By 1865, 68 forts and 93 batteries armed with over 800 cannons encircled Washington, DC. Today, 17 of the original sites are managed by the National Park Service.) These forts were arranged to command all approaches too the seat of government and were designed to mutually support their neighboring fortifications. As well as the forts, designed to house soldiers and store artillery and other supplies, the system included prepared but unarmed batteries for field guns and seven blockhouses that could be manned on an ad hoc basis.

=== Fort Albany ===
On Tuesday morning, July 23, the 1st Massachusetts received orders to pack up everything, and move across the Potomac to the vicinity of Arlington Heights. By 12:00 p.m., the regiment was on the march. At nightfall the men turned into a field on the canal which crossed the river at that point. The night was passed in the open air since the tents were still enroute and the camp proved to be an unfortunate selection, on account of its dampness and the heavy fogs at night, On Thursday, the regiment moved to Fort Albany, a bastioned earthwork that the Union Army built in Arlington County (Note: The county was known at the time as Alexandria County.) in Virginia. The Army constructed the fort during May 1861 as part of its Civil War defenses of Washington. The site was the most elevated spot of ground on Arlington Heights, overlooking not only Washington, Georgetown, and Alexandria, but the country round about for nearly a dozen miles in every direction. Overlooking a long stretch of the Potomac River, and nearly the whole extent of the capital, from the Georgetown line above to the Washington Navy Yard below, its heavy guns commanded not only the river and city in front, but also the whole sweep of farming country extending to the south and west.

At Fort Albany, the 1st Massachusett's numbers had been somewhat diminished by discharges for disability and other causes, but those remaining were realizing the struggle would be harder and longer than first expected and still maintained good morale. For the first few days, the men worked at improving the fort in the mornings, felling timber all around the fort, and in the afternoons, they drilled by battalion or brigades. New clothing of standard army blue jackets and sky blue trousers was issued to replace the gray militia uniforms, and, on July 29, the men were paid the first of the month in gold and silver.

The men seemed fully to appreciate the gravity of their duty to hold and defend Fort Albany. Despite being infantry, the men learned how to operate the fort's big guns. The heavy pieces were rolled backwards and forwards from their positions, and loading and firing drills conducted until the men handled them easily and quickly.| (Note: A May 17, 1864, report from the Union Army's Inspector of Artillery (see Union Army artillery organization) noted the following: ... two 24-pounder field howitzers, four 24-pounder siege, two Parrotts, one Coehorn mortar, one 10-inch mortar. (See: Official Records of the War of the Rebellion))

=== Blasdensburg ===
Friction between the regiment and the rest of Richardson's brigade led to a request for transfer to another. This request was granted on Friday, August 9, when the command was ordered to march to the vicinity of Bladensburg, MD on the other side of the river and the capital. An alert for an impending Confederate attack delayed the move until the following Thursday, August 15. At 8:00 a.m. in a drenching rain, the regiment and its twenty-five wagons left the fort, recrossed the Potomac over Long Bridge, marched through Washington, and stopped on a knoll just short of Bladensburg, MD in Prince George's County (ten miles in all). There, a new camp, known as Camp Union, was laid out and tents pitched. The 1st Massachusetts joined Brig.-Gen. Joseph Hooker's brigade alongside the 11th Massachusetts, the 2nd New-Hampshire, and the 26th Pennsylvania.

The men, only four decades removed from the War of 1812 were familiar with Bladensburg's historical reputation as the site of the disastrous 1814 battle and the Bladensburg Dueling Grounds. The regiment found most of its inhabitants were Unionists, although not as overt as the people in New England, on account of threats from secessionist partisans. The men also became familiar with its spring which proved a good source of water.Soon after arriving the men joined the rest of the brigade in building Fort Lincoln—one of the cordon surrounding Washington.

Despite voting to remain in the United States, Maryland was a slave state and had a large minority of secessionists who overtly and covertly supported the rebels. As a result, security was very tight in the Washington area. The 1st Massachusetts men were not allowed to go to other camps, nor visit Bladensburg, Washington, or the neighborhood, without the regimental commander's written permission, and at night, travel also required challenges and passwords. The Washington and Baltimore Railroad, and the principal common roads, were continuously, strictly guarded. No one was allowed to travel on them without the required permissions. The regiment manned checkpoints inspecting people and their belongings before letting them proceed. They supplemented issued supplies and rations through trade with locals on the highway and traded regularly for fresh fruits, vegetables, and poultry with slaves from neighboring farms and plantations on Sundays, their only free time allowed. The men of the regiment appreciated their warmth in contrast to some of the local white residents.

At Camp Union, the regiment frequently had musketry training on the firing range, and occasionally the brigade would turn out for volley firing. The first day this was done the townspeople of Bladensburg, hearing the heavy gunfgire, thought the enemy was attacking the town. The residents rushed out into the streets, listened a moment, seized whatever was close at hand, and started off for the forest. After the first day of musketry, the locals grew accutomed to it.

=== Securing Maryland ===
Just shy of a month later, on Monday, September 9, 1861, the 1st Massachusetts received orders sending them into lower Maryland. The federal government had received reports that in some parts of Lower Maryland, rebels were crossing Potomac and Chesapeake Bay and recruiting cavalry and infantry for their army. The rebels were gathering arms, uniforms, munitions, and other material through this region and taking them back into their lines. The area had a strong and active secessionist element that was rumored to was planning to disrupt the upcoming state elections.

To forestall this, the War Department deemed it advisable to send a regiment or two of infantry, and a few hundred cavalry, to stop these activities and safeguard the elections. On Sunday, September 8, the 1st Massachusetts was ordered to prepare five days' rations and be in readiness to cross the Anacostia at six o'clock the next morning. In the predawn Monday darkness the order to turn out went round from tent to tent. The men made ready, stuffing their haversacks as full as possible, and storing their knapsacks at the fort. At precisely 6:00 a.m., in light marching order, the marching line was formed. The journey began shortly, and continued, without opposition, through a semi-hostile country south through Prince George's county until 6:30 p.m., when the soldiers bivouacked in an oak-grove, not far from Marlborough situated on a branch of the Patuxent River, which runs into Chesapeake Bay. The county seat, (Note: Prince George's County lies in the Atlantic coastal plain, and its landscape is characterized by gently rolling hills and valleys. It borders Montgomery County on the west and the Patuxent River forms the county's eastern border with Howard, Anne Arundel, Charles and Calvert counties.) twenty-three miles southwest of Annapolis, it had about one thousand inhabitants. Since the river is navigable to the town, giving it considerable commercial importance, it made it a logical place to interdict the traffic of war material into the Confederacy. The men of the regiment noted the considerable wealth of the town, but found the people were moderately secessionist or non-committal in their sentiments, but very much wanted to be left alone. Since no arms or uniforms were found in the town although several houses were searched from cellar to attic, the 1st Massachusetts moved on.

The regiment crossed the Patuxent into Anne Arundel County. Once across on the other shore, the roads were unwalled and unfenced passing through the center of plantations. The plantations themselves were divided from each other by fences, and large gates closed entirely across the road. At every plantation, a detail would have to hold these open for the column to pass through. The plantations varied greatly in size and state from well kept and profitable to desolate and forsaken. The fields were full of wheat, rye, oats, and corn, but the main crop was tobacco and huge drying barns appeared on nearly every plantation. Livestock was quite abundant, especially pigs. The local black population, two-thirds of whom were slaves, seemed to outnumber the white population. The regiment soon found the slaves to be a good source of intelligence.

While patrolling Lower Maryland, the regiment visited several places towns and seized various quantities of arms and contraband goods. These stores had been carefully hidden, but the local black population, especially the enslaved, "did not require much coaxing to induce them to point out the localities" of the hidden war materials. These people provided critical intelligence on roads, the names and character of residents in the county, and the recruiting efforts prior to the regiment's arrival to raise a company each of cavalry and infantry from the neighborhood. At the same time, the regiment found themselves a magnet for several fugitive slaves and in a legal bind when a master, "professing to be a good Union man, armed with a United-States warrant, and accompanied by the provost marshal of the district," showed up, and the regiment was forced to return the people, an unpopular act with the men.

The furthest south that the 1st searched was at Prince Fredericktown (Note: Roger Brooke Taney, the Chief Justice of the U.S. Supreme Court in the Dred Scott decision, was born and raised on a farm near Prince Frederick. For more information see Roger Brooke Taney his Wikipedia article.) on Chesapeake Bay. This village, the Calvert County seat, had been in open revolt and was the headquarters of the locally recruited rebel cavalry and infantry, flying the Confederate flag above the Court House. The regiment's approach had caused the principal secessionist inhabitants to flee, but returned in course of a day or two, "astonished and delighted to find that their habitations had not been destroyed nor their friends molested," as the Confederate propaganda predicted. In the course of their stay, the men found many arms and contraband bound for the rebels and released two Unionist locals from the jail. The regiment's presence ensured the safety of and encouraged other local Unionists, but a local proslavery newspaper continued to publish "the most outrageous lies concerning the troops. The 1st Massachusetts inferred the editor's sympathies revealed a strong current of secessionism in his readership.

On Sunday, October 6, having accomplished the pacification of the area and encouraged the Unionist population in Lower Maryland, the regiment was ordered to return to Camp Union. They left at dawn on Monday and arrived back at camp about noon. They had been away twenty-eight days, travelled two hundred and seventy-two miles, and accomplished their mission.

=== Budd's Ferry ===
During the fall of 1861, to cut Washington off from the Chesapeake, the rebels built several batteries on the Potomac's south bank and seized and armed a small steamer. To prevent the sealing of the river, Washington sent Hooker's division, including the 1st, to occupy the north bank at Budd's Ferry. On Thursday, October 24, the regiment marched twelve miles to the river, camping the first night directly opposite Alexandria. By Friday dusk, they had moved twenty-two miles to Piscataqua. Having learned the situation was getting troublesome, on Saturday, the regiment pushed hard over muddy roads carrying full kit twenty-three miles to Posey's Plantation, directly opposite Quantico Creek, by 8:00 p.m.

The U.S. forces in the vicinity numbered over 10,000 men in ten different camps, scattered all along the Potomac's north bank. Located from two to six miles apart with pickets out, the camps allowed Hooker to his forces quicker than the rebels could cross the river. Despite rebel batteries firing on all traffic passing them, less than half a dozen vessels were hit over the nearly five months of the regiment's tenure. . During the 1st Massachusetts' duty there, telegraph lines linked the various posts, Hooker, and the War Department. The regiment also saw the use of Lowe's observation balloons to survey rebel positions. (Note: "Professor" Thaddeus S. C. Lowe, a New Hampshire Yankee native used a hydrogen balloon to provide reliable intelligence. The balloon, when raised a thousand feet or so, gave an uninterrupted view of the enemy's dispositions and movements. A telegraph line linked it to the ground network letting its intelligence spread to all posts as well as Hooker and army headquarters in Washington.)

During their stay, the 1st, like other regiments, gathered a number of small boats. On Thursday afternoon, November 14, the rebels opened fire, about a mile above Shipping Point, on an unmanned lumber schooner anchored about half a mile from the north bank shore. At their own suggestion, three men went out to survey the result and locate the rebel batteries. The schooner had been hit three times, but was not damaged. Upon their return, Lt. Col. Wells ordered a detail to secure the ship from further attention, but as they got in their boats, the rebels tried to burn an unmanned lumber schooner anchored about half a mile from the north bank shore. As thirty Confederates in two boats came off the south bank, the 1st Massachusetts' entire brigade rushed down to the riverbank. Parts of several companies of the regiment joined the initial detail and hopped in boats and rowed for the rebels under fire from batteries on the Virginia shore. The rebels reached the schooner first, set her on fire, and left before the regiment's men arrived. The flames were under full headway, pouring out of the hatchways, when the 1st Massachusetts threw off her deck load of wood, cut through the deck, and extinguished the fire. Next, they weighed anchor, and sailed her upriver to safety.

During the quiet moonlight nights, or when the wind was calm and favorable in the daytime, the regiment's pickets would occasionally banter with the rebels on the other side. While the regiment was at Budd's Ferry, they intercepted and seized many vessels loaded with articles contraband of war. As winter approached the regiment replaced their tents at Camp Hooker with log cabins. By this time, the enlisted barracks had been completed as 72 feet by 20 feet structures containing four rooms with an open space in the center for a stove or fireplace, and bunks for 25 men. Company officers lived in square log-huts of two rooms, one for the captain and the other for his two lieutenants. The field and staff officers had single ten foot square cabins.

The men also sought off-duty activities. Some men formed a temperance society and a literary institute that held lectures, addresses, debates, concerts, dialogues, and recitations. The regiment also built a chapel and lending library. "The Massachusetts First Chess Club" was also formed. The camp also had brigade and regimental hospitals. As at Bladenburg, slaves often emancipated themselves by making their way to the division's camps. Some came from Virginia, but many also came from Maryland. The men learned more about slavery as these people related their experiences and how they felt about it. Many would remain with the regiment for many months.

The men also noted the absence of white men in the area and "an incomprehensible number of widows" that elicited "not a little sympathy." Occasionally, deserters came across the river and readily gave up intelligence on the other side. As a result, on Monday, December 9, two gunboats came down from Washington and shelled some storehouses opposite Camp Hooker, destroying them. The regiment also learned that they also lacked operational security when some members in a boat on the Potomac, were driven by a sudden squall to the Virginia shore where they were taken prisoner. Taken to Richmond and interrogated, they found their questioners knew their forces' dispositions, size, readiness, and command structure. After parole and return to the regiment, they had the added aggravation of rebel pickets shouting their countersign for the night over the river before it had been given out to all their own sentinels on guard.

On Wednesday, December 25, Christmas in camp brought care packages and gifts from families and friends at home. They remained there as the year closed.

== Operations in the second year - 1862 ==
In the new year, several changes were made in the regimental roster. Daring acts were being constantly done by the men during this winter, which as it was their first, and devoid of the stir of an active campaign, seemed otherwise dull and tedious. Among these were several incidents of protecting river traffic being targeted by the rebel batteries.

The winter brought wet weather to Camp Hooker which required the building of a corduroy road to counter the deep muddy morass of the roads. The men made the best of it as they build it, cutting down trees and putting them in place. The road ran from all the camps, along the riverbank to the division supply depot at Rum Point. The men took pride in the result, "the best road in this part of Maryland, solid, wide, substantial."

Early in March, the men noticed a lot of activity among the rebels across the river with huge fires kept burning day and night. Interference with river traffic ceased to be constant with occasional periods of quiet punctuated by the formerly regular cannonades. ." On Sunday afternoon, March 9, during a gunboat reconnaissance, the rebel batteries, to the men's astonishment, were suddenly evacuated. (Note: This abandonment was part of a general rebel withdrawal from along the Potomac to a new line along the Rappahannock. McClellan had originally intended to move on a direct line from Washington to Richmond. Before he could implement his plans, Lieut. Gen. Joseph E. Johnston withdrew that Sunday completely nullifying McClellan's plans. He then retooled his plan so that his troops would disembark at Fort Monroe, Virginia, and advance up the Virginia Peninsula to Richmond. However, McClellan came under extreme criticism from the press and the Congress when it was found that Johnston's forces had not only slipped away unnoticed, but had for months fooled the Union Army through the use of Quaker Guns.) The opposite shore for miles up and down the Potomac, was in an uproar as fires were set, guns spiked, gunpowder blown up resulting in dense smoke arose from all the camps as they were burned and deserted. The 1st Massachusetts men were among the enthusiastic and delighted crowd of spectators on the Maryland side. The activity was reported to higher commands.

With the abandonment of the south bank, companies from the 1st Massachusetts and the rest of the division were soon sent over to investigate. After a brief reconnaissance, they returned. On Monday, 500 men from the brigade went over again to make thorough investigations. They found at Shipping Point sixteen heavy guns, three of which were wooden dummies intended to deceive balloonists, four burst, and the rest spiked. While the fortifications showed professional design and construction, the large quantity of regimental papers and private letters indicated "both a lax state of discipline among the troops, and gross ignorance on the part of the officers." The company rolls and morning reports of regiments showed that there had been great mortality among the men. In a coffin-warehouse, where twelve ready-made coffins were found, an order came to light for twenty-four coffins to be furnished to one regiment at one time. Members of the 1st came across numbers of graves that were marked with warnings against violating the sanctity of the tomb. After their earlier experiences in lower Maryland, the suspicious men took spades and shovels to the task and speedily exhumed not human remains but numbers of nice new tents, packages of clothing, and mess-chests. The gravediggers were complimented for the success.

When inspecting the deserted camps, the regiment's members noted the competent design and construction while the interiors of the "houses, beds, and everything else, in fact, were filthy to the last degree." The men found a considerable quantity of supplies and goods that escaped the fires were brought back across the river to camp. They thought that the rebel camps abundantly supplied, but an apparent lack of discipline had not kept them neat and clean, and the quarters were infested with vermin. The rebels seemed to have lived upon the fat of the land. Orders were soon issued to remove all property of value from the rebel position and render it useless for defensive purposes. After three days' work, the batteries on Cockpit and Shipping Points were dismantled. Military property loaded into lighters; and soon silence and desolation reigned along the shore so lately trodden by rebel feet and shaken by the roar of rebel artillery. Hooker reported this information to McClellan on Wednesday, March 12. After this date, the Potomac became alive with Union sailing-craft, and steamboats of all sizes. Thousands upon thousands of troops were transported down the river towards the Peninsula, and preparations were made, as rapidly as possible, to vacate Budd's Ferry, and join in the Army of the Potomac (AoP) on the peninsula.

Before leaving, the issue of fugitive slaves working in the camps became an issue as Congress had passed a law forbidding the army to assist in the recovery of slaves, but it did not stop local slave owners from seeking permission to search the camps. While permission was given, the slave-hunters found the troops unwilling and were greeted with jeers and left empty-handed. (Note: Cudworth wrote: "In a certain regiment of Gen. Sickles's brigade, one of these heartless scoundrels dared to discharge a pistol at a negro who refused to stop when he commanded and was summarily hustled out of the camp. Another took a stick to his chattel; and the chattel, sniffing the air of emancipation, wrenched it out of; his hands, and gave the holder such a taste of its quality, that he called out to the surrounding soldiers to interfere. But the soldiers were law-abiding citizens from New York: it was un-congressional to interfere, and, in some singular manner, the chattel spirited himself away, leaving no token of his presence other than the ireful exasperation and aching shoulders of his former master. So, the tables turned. So, liberty sprang to life wherever was seen the gleam of Union bayonets or heard the tramp of Union battalions.") At the same time, slaves continually crossed the river, bag and baggage, and were escorted to our provost-marshal who passed them on to Washington; the slave owners having left them, they made the move to freedom.

=== Peninsular Campaign ===
McClellan's planned campaign on the peninsula saw an increase in river traffic as men and supplies moved south to Fort Monroe. With the advent of spring, the 1st Massachusetts' barracks were turned into hospitals in preparation for the campaign, and the regiment moved out of their winter quarters and into tents. The Fay Literary Institute's library was left for the use of the hospital patients.

Meanwhile, the federal operation was complicated by the presence of the Confederate ironclad warship, CSS Virginia threatening naval operations on the James River. Despite the Battle of Hampton Roads (March 8–9, 1862), being inconclusive, the net result was keeping Virginia out of Hampton Roads. On March 17, the AoP began sailing from Alexandria. Since the Virginia was still in operation, the navy could not assure McClellan that they could protect operations on either the James or the York, so his plan of amphibiously enveloping Yorktown was abandoned, and he ordered an advance up the Peninsula to begin April 4.

Back in their Camp Hooker, the soldiers in the 1st sent all superfluous baggage to Washington for storage. New clothing, shoes, and caps were issued to the companies, with whatever articles were needed to complete their accoutrements; and every cartridge-box received a full supply of powder and ball. On Friday, April 4, orders were issued to pack up everything, and move to the transports. Accordingly, at 4:00 a.m., reveille was sounded Saturday morning, breakfast was eaten straightway, tents struck at 6:00 a.m., the line formed an hour later; and by 9:00, everything was on board the steamboat Kennebec. The men embarked expecting a stay of less than 24 hours, but they did not get underway until Monday morning, April 7.

When the Kennebec arrived at the mouth of the Potomac, a storm had arisen, so the steamer anchored to ride it out. The storm began to abate Wednesday evening, when the trip was resumed. At 9:00 a.m., Thursday, April 10, the steamer anchored off Fortress Monroe and the men were running out of rations having spent five days instead of one crowded aboard. Friday morning, the regiment disembarked at Ship Point, on the York River, and made camp in the surrounding woods. Once there the men noted the Monitor,the ram Vanderbilt, and the masts of the frigate Cumberland, which had been sunk by the Virginia. At Ship Point, which the rebels had fortified, large numbers of troops disembarked from steamers, quartermasters' and commissaries' stores piled up, ordnance amassed, and the AoP's regiments lay in every direction awaiting orders. The 1st Massachusetts deemed the site very unfavorable due to its low, swampy condition.

As a result, on Saturday afternoon, April 12, the regiment marched six miles to a new site on higher and dryer land in the midst of a pine growth. The local white residents were civil and respectful with most of the men having joined the rebel army. (Note: The Confederacy passed the First Conscription Act, on April 16, 1862, that made any white male between 18 and 35 years old liable to three years of military service. For more information, see the Wikipedia article.) Until Wednesday, April 16, the regiment were building a wharf, loading and unloading vessels, and making themselves comfortable in their tents. The men saw fresh troops pouring in daily and marching in the direction of Yorktown where the sound of artillery was heard. The rediment was eager to press forward and engage the enemy. The 1st Massachusetts had high morale and were confident of their success in the expected fight.

==== Siege of Yorktown ====
On Wednesday, April 16, the regiment crossed the Poquoson River continuing four miles toward Yorktown, passing fortifications in various stages of completion. Spring rains and marshy soil made the roads impassable for heavy artillery, so fatigue parties were building corduroy roads. The regiment's new camp, Camp Winfield Scott, was in a wood two miles from the front. (Note: The men noted their camp was close to the site of Cornwallis' surrender almost 81 years before on October 19. 1781.) The AoP's entire position, extended across the peninsula from the Warwick River's mouth, a tributary of the James, to Wormley's Creek, one of the York.

The Sunday after the 1st Massachusetts' arrival, two-thirds of the army were within cannon shot of the rebels (commanded by Maj. Gen. "Prince" John Magruder) screened by intervening woods, and noise discipline imposed silencing the regiment's band and drum-calls, and musketry restricted to actual frontline duty. Incessantly working, the 1st stood alert under arms for an hour or more before dawn and, after breakfast, worked on roads, trenches, or in the woods. Returning utterly exhausted after dark, they stood to arms every night due to an enemy sorties or false alarms.

The night the regiment arrived, an abortive attack at Lee's Mills by the Vermont Brigade, despite initial success, led both sides to perpetually keep watch leading to the musketry and artillery fire, especially at night, when any shadow, sound, or movement was mistaken for the enemy. Work on exposed trenches was done in darkness, and work continued under cover in daylight (which the 1st deemed riskier since the enemy could get the range and observe the effect of their shot). At night, enemy fire was mostly guess-work, and every detail kept an armed watch. White smoke during the day and at a flash at night warned of incoming fire, giving the men time to get cover. Despite this excitement, after a week or so, exhaustion led men, finished with their assignments, to drop back a few paces out of sight behind the line, and sleep through the cacophony of rebel artillery. During the day, under cover of earthworks, the 1st Massachusetts noted the effectiveness of Berdan's sharpshooters in silencing the rebel artillery and pickets, but at night, when the sharp-shooters were relieved, the rebel pickets returned. (Note: Per Cudworth, "Once or twice during the darkness, the rebel pickets were posted inside our lines, or ours inside theirs; a mistake that did not remain long undiscovered.)

Among the rebel outworks, a lunette 700-800 yards forward of their line interfered with the work details. McClellan decided to destroy it, and at 1:00 a.m., Saturday, April 26, companies A, H, and I along with two from the 11th Massachusetts, were led to a point in the woods nearest this lunette, 400 yards across an open cornfield under coverage of rebel guns. Companies A and I acted as flank and reserve, and H made the charge just at dawn. Ten minutes later the three companies took the redoubt at bayonet sending its garrison flying in confusion. Immediately, the 11th's two companies joined them with shovels and picks levelling the redoubt to the ground within an hour. Once done, A, H, I, and the 11th's companies withdrew through a terrific fire of round shot, shell, grape, and canister. The operation cost the 1st Massachusetts three killed, one mortally wounded, and sixteen wounded. The 11th's Company A captured fifteen rebels. (Note: The dead were buried and wounded moved to hospital ships at the piers on the York, and on Wednesday, April 30, the four dead were exhumed and sent North for re-interment.)

This operation caused the rebels to increase fire during the day upon our gunboats, earthworks, fatigue-parties, and picket-reserves, as well as making the night more dangerous. Picket duty also became more arduous with the men roused at midnight, supplied with a days' rations, and marched in the dark to posts within artillery and musketry range of rebel lines with scant cover. With every sense alert, the 1st manned pickets until relief through all weather and under occasional rebel sorties. Frequent inspections ensured that guns and equipment were in perfect order. Trenches were worked on by every regiment along the whole AoP line with sometimes as many as 10,000 men working guarded by others near at hand, and under fire from the rebel batteries.

As the AoP's parallels grew closer and more siege artillery came into action, rebel fire seemed to increase. On Saturday, May 3, the rebels bombarded federal lines leading many in the AoP to expect a general assault. Having used Lowe's balloons throughout the campaign, McClellan made a balloon flight directly in front of the 1st Massachusetts' line. Clearing the trees, rebel fire soon forced him to descend and ride away without seeing much. During the night, the barrage continued until about 3:00 a.m., Sunday morning when it suddenly ceased. In the dark, pickets listened but heard nothing, trying to peer through the dark but seeing nothing. Creeping slowly and cautiously forward, they met with no opposition. Finally, reaching the rebel breastworks, they found the Confederates had left.

During the barrage, the Confederates had evacuated their sick and wounded, all their portable supplies, and light artillery. They left heavy guns, ammunition, tents, an unburnt Yorktown, and their entire line which proved more formidable than thought upon inspection. As news spread, the AoP's mood changed, and as men, released from the perils of siege warfare, felt a triumphant exhilaration of joy, and were ready to follow McClellan anywhere, so thoroughly had he won their confidence by taking Yorktown without a battle. No longer silenced, bands, drums, and fifes were heard playing in patriotic jubilation. Soon, however, intelligence revealed the rebels had only fallen back a short distance to a shorter, better, and more strongly fortified position in front of Williamsburg. The Confederates had concluded McClellan's siegeworks made Yorktown untenable and opted to withdraw to in front of Williamsburg.

As the AoP's cavalry pursued, briefly overtaking the rebel rearguard until they entered the Williamsburg entrenchments, the 1st was busy issuing rations, sending the sick to the hospital ships at Cheeseman's Landing, striking tents, and preparing for march. By 11:00 a.m., most of the AoP was moving towards Yorktown. The roads were strewn with military debris and the regiment's men noted the overpowering stench from dead horses, stagnant pools of water, or garbage left to rot in the sun. Blackened tree stumps, abandoned caissons, broken-down army wagons, and half-ruined barn and huts completed a scene of unmitigated desolation, above which in the distance Lowe's balloon, "The Intrepid," watched over the distant roads the retreating foe had gone. As the regiment passed through Yorktown, the 1st found, "with an infernal ingenuity," the Confederates had thickly strewn booby traps along the route, under coats, in pitchers, in carpet-bags, in flour barrels, and planting them near springs, tents, magazines, and storehouses, killing and wounding a few unwary AoP members before nightfall. When found, men began marking them with small flags, and McClellan ordered rebel POWs to remove them.

==== Battle of Williamsburg ====
As the AoP advanced on the rebel lines at Williamsburg, Lieut. Gen. Johnston, now commanded the main body of the rebel army, and to protect his trains, reinforced Magruder Sunday night, May 4, at Williamsburg. When the AoP made contact early Monday morning, the lines stretched across the peninsula about a mile in front of the city. The principal work was Fort Magruder which covered all roads and fields approaching the city. Here soon after noon, on Sunday, the AoP's right and left wings (the 1st was in III Corps on the right) linked up seven miles southeast of Williamsburg. As rebel cavalry fought a delaying action, the AoP advanced five miles stopping two miles short of Fort Magruder at midnight and bivouacked.

At daybreak, Monday, May 5, the 1st Massachusetts in the 1st Brigade, III Corps, reformed, and marched on the Confederates. For a mile and a half, the 1st moved through woods up a clear road seeing no signs of rebels. Once the road met a plain before Williamsburg, the regiment stopped as the division's advance guard contacted rebel pickets. The 1st Massachusetts pushed a strong skirmish line to the left of the road through woods and an abatis that completely enfiladed the road and the fort where the parapets were too low to protect the artillery crews. As soon as the rebel guns opened up, the skirmishers silenced the rebel guns for the rest of the morning. A light rain that started before dawn, now became heavy.

Through the heavy rain, a battery had been brought up and sited before the woods on the road's right. Its galling by the rebels' musketry sent the unwounded to flight. Manned by nearby infantry volunteers, the guns sank in the mud, and soon the rebels took them temporarily, as they also found them stuck in the mud. The battle grew heavier in the downpour as U.S. advance was stymied.

The Confederates soon began to sortie from their lines and during a couple of hours stealthily approached the woods and abatis. Due to the confusion of rapid firing, woods, smoke, and rain, the rebels drove the skirmishers back as far as the infantry reserves but were consistently repulsed and invariably followed by an even stronger skirmish line. In this ebbing and flowing, the regiment noted the rebels, in repeated instances, gave the AoP's thirsty wounded water from their own canteens, and moved some to safer positions. There seemed no intention to advance beyond the woods but a determination to hold the present position. At the same time, the rebels could neither draw nor drive the AoP despite numerous attacks in large numbers. The 1st Massachusetts and the rest of the army held firm.

To force them back, Johnston brought back troops he had already withdrawn and attacked III Corps on the left and down the road at the same time. Since the initial skirmishers who silenced the fort's guns had been withdrawn, these same guns bombarded the 1st Massachusetts and its compatriots wreaking havoc as tree branches fell upon and among the troops standing or laying behind trees and stumps. As rebel marksmen screened them, the 10,000 man Confederate columns neared. The regiment heard the New Jersey and Excelsior brigades pouring volleys into the enemy and expected imminent contact. A body of troops varied-colored uniforms were soon on scene and deploying a battle line almost within pistol-shot of the 1st Massachusetts. Before they could fire, the 1st's men staggered them with a volley, but, rallied by their officers, they crowded forward making gaps in the division's ranks until they turned a brigade's flank. The 1st Massachusetts and its division were now running low on ammunition, exhausted, and soaked when Hooker rallied his men and made a fighting withdrawal. Despite being completely disorganized, the men halted, formed, (Note: Per Cudworth, "as if actuated by a common impulse; and, as the rebels pressed forward to follow up their advantage, turned upon them like a thunderbolt.") and counterattacked. Surprised at the repulse, and pressed by their own men behind them, they fired back, but did little harm.

At the same time, the divisions of Kearney, Berry, and Birney came up and forcing the Confederates back and relieving Hooker's division which fell back to the rear to form the new reserve. As the men of the 1st Massachusetts recouped, the AoP held the field, and the roar of battle ceased. During all this time, the heavy rain had continued and many in the regiment had not eaten for 24 hours, nor slept much for 48, and were utterly exhausted. (Note: Per Cudworth, "In Gen. Daniel E. Sickles' brigade (the Excelsiors), they had a new kind of gun, mounted on wheels, which went with a crank, and discharged, perhaps, a hundred balls a minute. These were energetically worked and did good execution.") The 1st lost seven killed, thirty-two wounded, and four missing for a total of forty-three.

Early on the Tuesday morning, May 7, scouts reported that the enemy had evacuated Williamsburg during the night. It was not long before the regiment were investigating Williamsburg, being the oldest incorporated town in Virginia.

==== Battles of Fair Oaks and Seven Pines ====
, May 31 – June 1.

==== The Seven Days Battles before Richmond ====
June 25 – July 1. Battles of Oak Grove June 25; Savage Station June 29; White Oak Swamp and Glendale June 30; Malvern Hill July 1.

==== Harrison's Landing ====
until August 15.

=== The Northern Virginia Campaign ===
Movement to Fortress Monroe, thence to Centreville August 15–26. Bristoe Station or Kettle Run August 27. Catlett's Station August 28. Battles of Groveton August 29 and Bull Run August 30. Active also Chantilly, Sept. 1, 1862

=== Duty near Washington ===
Duty in the Defences of Washington until December --. At Fort Lyon until September 13. Near Fairfax Seminary until October 20 and at Munson's Hill until November 1. Duty at Fairfax Station November 2–25. Operations on Orange & Alexandria Railroad November 10–12.

=== Fredericksburg campaign ===
Moved from Munson's Hill November 1. Duty at Fairfax Station November 2–25. Conducted operations on the Orange & Alexandria Railroad November 10 through 12. Fought at the Battle of Fredericksburg, Va., December 12–15.

== Under Burnside, Hooker, and Meade - 1863 ==
=== The post-Fredericksburg AoP ===
"Mud March" January 20–24, 1863.

=== Hooker takes command and the Chancellorsville Campaign ===
At Falmouth until April 27. Operations at Rappahannock Bridge and Grove Church February 5–7. Chancellorsville Campaign April 27 – May 6. Battle of Chancellorsville May 1–5.

=== Lee's invasion and the Gettysburg Campaign ===
Gettysburg (Pa.) Campaign June 11 – July 24. Battle of Gettysburg July 1–3. Pursuit of Lee until July 24.

=== The Draft Riots ===
Moved to New York July 30 – August 1. Duty at Governor's Island Ricker's Island and David's Island, New York Harbor until October 15.

=== Return to Virginia ===
Moved to Washington October 15 thence to Union Mills, Va., and rejoin Corps October 17. Advance to line of the Rappahannock November 7–8. Kelly's Ford November 7. Mine Run Campaign November 26-December 2. Payne's Farm November 27.

== The last six months of service - 1864 ==
=== Grant comes east ===
Duty near Brandy Station until May 1864. Demonstration on the Rapidan February 6–7.

=== The Overland campaign ===
Rapidan Campaign May 3–20. Battles of the Wilderness May 5 7; Spottsylvania May 8–12; Spottsylvania Court House May 12–21. Assault on the Salient at Spottsylvania Court House May 12. Harris Farm or Fredericksburg Road May 19.

=== End of enlistment ===
Ordered home for muster out May 20 Veterans and Recruits transferred to 11th Massachusetts Infantry May 20. Mustered out May 25, 1864. Expiration of term.

== Affiliations, battle honors, detailed service, and casualties ==
=== Organizational affiliation ===
Attached to:

- Attached to Brig. Gen. Richardson's Brigade, Brig. Gen. Tyler's Division, Maj. Gen. McDowell's Army of Northeast Virginia, to August, 1861
- Brig. Gen. Hooker's Brigade, Army of the Potomac|Division of the Potomac, to October, 1861
- 1st Brigade, Hooker's Division, Army of the Potomac (AoP) to March, 1862
- 1st Brigade, 2nd Division, III Corps, AoP, to March, 1864
- 1st Brigade, 4th Division, II Corps, AoP, to May, 1864

=== List of battles ===
The official list of battles in which the regiment bore a part:

- Battle of Blackburn's Ford
- First Battle of Bull Run
- Siege of Yorktown
- Battle of Williamsburg
- Battle of Seven Pines
- Battle of Glendale
- Second Battle of Bull Run
- Battle of Fredericksburg
- Battle of Chancellorsville
- Battle of Gettysburg
- Battle of Mine Run
- Battle of the Wilderness
- Battle of Spotsylvania Court House

=== Detailed service ===
Detailed service is as follows:

==== 1861 ====
- Left State for Washington, D. C., June 15,
- Arrived in Washington June 17.
- Duty at Camp Banks, Georgetown, D. C., until July 16, 1861.
- Advance on Manassas, Va., July 16·21.
- Occupation of Fairfax Court House July 17.
- First Battle of Bull Run July 21.
- At Fort Albany until August 15.
- Moved to Bladensburg August 15 and duty there until September 7.
- Expedition to Lower Maryland September 7-October 7.
- Moved to Posey's Plantation October 25–27.
- Duty there and at Shipping Point until April 5, 1862.
- Affair at Mattawoman Creek November 14. 1861.

==== 1862 ====
- Ordered to Fortress Monroe, Va., April 7, 1862, thence to Yorktown.
- The Peninsula Campaign
  - Siege of Yorktown April 16-May 4.
  - Affair at Yorktown April 26 (Cos. "A," "H" and "I").
  - Battle of Williamsburg May 5.
  - Battle of Fair Oaks, Seven Pines, May 31-June 1.
  - Seven days before Richmond June 25-July 1.
  - Battles of Oak Grove June 25.
  - Savage Station June 29.
  - White Oak Swamp and Glendale June 30:
  - Malvern Hill July 1.
- At Harrison's Landing until August 15.
- Movement to Fortress Monroe, thence to Centreville August 15–26.
- Bristoe Station or Kettle Run August 27.
- Catlett's Station August 28.
- Battles of Groveton August 29, and Bull Run August 30.
- Duty in the Defenses of Washington until December
- At Fort Lyon until September 13.
- Near Fairfax Seminary until October 20
- Munson's Hill until November 1.
- Duty at Fairfax Station November 2–25.
- Operations on Orange & Alexandria Railroad November 10–12
- Battle of Fredericksburg, Va., December 12–15.

=== 1863 ===
- "Mud March" January 20–24, 1863.
- At Falmouth until April 27.
- Operations at Rappahannock Bridge and Grove Church February 5–7.
- Chancellorsville Campaign April 27-May 6.
  - Battle of Chancellorsville May 1–5.
- Gettysburg (Pa.) Campaign June 11-July 24.
  - Battle of Gettysburg July 1·3.
  - Pursuit of Lee until July 24.
- Moved to New York July 30-August 1.
- Duty at Governor's Island, Ricker's Island and David's Island, New York Harbor, until October 15.
- Moved to Washington October 15
- Union Mills, Va., and rejoin Corps October 17.
- Advance to line of the Rappahannock November 7–8.
- Kelly's Ford November 7.
- Mine Run Campaign November 26-December 2.
  - Payne's Farm November 27.
- Duty near Brandy Station until May 1864.
- Demonstration on the Rapidan February 6–7.
- Overland Campaign May 3–20.
  - Battles of the Wilderness May 5–7.
  - Spottsylvania May 8–12.
  - Spottsylvania Court House May 12–21.
  - Assault on the Salient at Spottsylvania Court House May 12.
  - Harris Farm or Fredericksburg Road May 19.
- Ordered home for muster out May 20.
- Veterans and Recruits transferred to 11th Massachusetts Infantry May 20.
- Mustered out May 25, 1864, at expiration of term.

=== Casualties ===
During its term of service, it lost 8 Officers and 108 Enlisted men killed and mortally wounded and 1 Officer and 55 Enlisted men by disease for a total of 179. Seven further men were lost as prisoners of war.

== Armament & uniforms ==
=== Armament ===
Because the core of the regiment was an existing militia regiment, they temporarily furnished with old muskets of various patterns. Around June 12, 1861, the regiment went to the Watertown Arsenal where they received Springfield Model 1855 rifled musket with which they equipped all companies (some of which were the 1858 modification with simpler rear sight, a patch box on the side of the buttstock, and an iron nosecap). The 1855 Springfield was a .58 calibre Minié-type muzzle-loading fire-arm. It was issued with a square socket bayonet. The regiment did not use the Maynard tape primer in the field, but standard percussion caps. The regiment used these rifles through its service, replacing them with newer 1861 and 1863 models National Armory (NA) and contract (Note: In government records, National Armory refers to one of three United States Armory and Arsenals, the Springfield Armory, the Harpers Ferry Armory, and the Rock Island Arsenal. Rifle-muskets, muskets, and rifles were manufactured in Springfield and Harper's Ferry before the war. When the Rebels destroyed the Harpers Ferry Armory early in the American Civil War and stole the machinery for the Confederate central government-run Richmond Armory, the Springfield Armory was briefly the only government manufacturer of arms, until the Rock Island Arsenal was established in 1862. During this time production ramped up to unprecedented levels ever seen in American manufacturing up until that time, with only 9,601 rifles manufactured in 1860, rising to a peak of 276,200 by 1864. These advancements would not only give the Union a decisive technological advantage over the Confederacy during the war but served as a precursor to the mass production manufacturing that contributed to the post-war Second Industrial Revolution and 20th century machine manufacturing capabilities. American historian Merritt Roe Smith has drawn comparisons between the early assembly machining of the Springfield rifles and the later production of the Ford Model T, with the latter having considerably more parts, but producing a similar numbers of units in the earliest years of the 1913–1915 automobile assembly line, indirectly due to mass production manufacturing advancements pioneered by the armory 50 years earlier. These rifles were also produced by contracted commercial arms compnies who, by the contract, had to meet the NA manufacturing specifications.) manufactured rifle-muskets when necessary.

=== Ordnance Surveys ===
Survey for Fourth Quarter, 1862'

- A — 51 Springfield Rifled Muskets, model 1855, NA and contract, (.58 Cal.)
- B — 55 Springfield Rifled Muskets, model 1855, NA and contract, (.58 Cal.)
- C — 44 Springfield Rifled Muskets, model 1855, NA and contract, (.58 Cal.)
- D — 50 Springfield Rifled Muskets, model 1855, NA and contract, (.58 Cal.)
- E — 59 Springfield Rifled Muskets, model 1855, NA and contract, (.58 Cal.)
- F — 52 Springfield Rifled Muskets, model 1855, NA and contract, (.58 Cal.)
- G — 53 Springfield Rifled Muskets, model 1855, NA and contract, (.58 Cal.)
- H — 39 Springfield Rifled Muskets, model 1855, NA and contract, (.58 Cal.)
- I — 45 Springfield Rifled Muskets, model 1855, NA and contract, (.58 Cal.)
- K — 65 Springfield Rifled Muskets, model 1855, NA and contract, (.58 Cal.)

Survey for First Quarter, 1863'

- A — 49 Springfield Rifled Muskets, model 1855, 1861, NA and contract, (.58 Cal.)
- B — 55 Springfield Rifled Muskets, model 1855, 1861, NA and contract, (.58 Cal.)
- C — 46 Springfield Rifled Muskets, model 1855, 1861, NA and contract, (.58 Cal.)
- D — 45 Springfield Rifled Muskets, model 1855, 1861, NA and contract, (.58 Cal.)
- E — 50 Springfield Rifled Muskets, model 1855, 1861, NA and contract, (.58 Cal.)
- F — 51 Springfield Rifled Muskets, model 1855, 1861, NA and contract, (.58 Cal.)
- G — 49 Springfield Rifled Muskets, model 1855, 1861, NA and contract, (.58 Cal.)
- H — 40 Springfield Rifled Muskets, model 1855, 1861, NA and contract, (.58 Cal.)
- I — 42 Springfield Rifled Muskets, model 1855, 1861, NA and contract, (.58 Cal.)
- K — 55 Springfield Rifled Muskets, model 1855, 1861, NA and contract, (.58 Cal.)

Survey for Third Quarter, 1863'

- A — 36 Springfield Rifled Muskets, model 1855, 1861, NA and contract, (.58 Cal.)
- B — 39 Springfield Rifled Muskets, model 1855, 1861, NA and contract, (.58 Cal.)
- C — 41 Springfield Rifled Muskets, model 1855, 1861, NA and contract, (.58 Cal.)
- D — 34 Springfield Rifled Muskets, model 1855, 1861, NA and contract, (.58 Cal.)
- E — 37 Springfield Rifled Muskets, model 1855, 1861, NA and contract, (.58 Cal.)
- F — 40 Springfield Rifled Muskets, model 1855, 1861, NA and contract, (.58 Cal.)
- G — 49 Springfield Rifled Muskets, model 1855, 1861, NA and contract, (.58 Cal.)
- H — 26 Springfield Rifled Muskets, model 1855, 1861, NA and contract, (.58 Cal.)
- I — 28 Springfield Rifled Muskets, model 1855, 1861, NA and contract, (.58 Cal.)
- K — 42 Springfield Rifled Muskets, model 1855, 1861, NA and contract, (.58 Cal.)

Survey for Fourth Quarter, 1864'

- A — 37 Springfield Rifled Muskets, model 1855, 1861, NA and contract, (.58 Cal.)
- B — 34 Springfield Rifled Muskets, model 1855, 1861, NA and contract, (.58 Cal.)
- C — 34 Springfield Rifled Muskets, model 1855, 1861, NA and contract, (.58 Cal.)
- D — 36 Springfield Rifled Muskets, model 1855, 1861, NA and contract, (.58 Cal.)
- E — 35 Springfield Rifled Muskets, model 1855, 1861, NA and contract, (.58 Cal.)
- F — 42 Springfield Rifled Muskets, model 1855, 1861, NA and contract, (.58 Cal.)
- G — 38 Springfield Rifled Muskets, model 1855, 1861, NA and contract, (.58 Cal.)
- H — 31 Springfield Rifled Muskets, model 1855, 1861, NA and contract, (.58 Cal.)
- I — 36 Springfield Rifled Muskets, model 1855, 1861, NA and contract, (.58 Cal.)
- K — 44 Springfield Rifled Muskets, model 1855, 1861, NA and contract, (.58 Cal.)

=== Shoulder Arms Gallery ===
Issued weapons

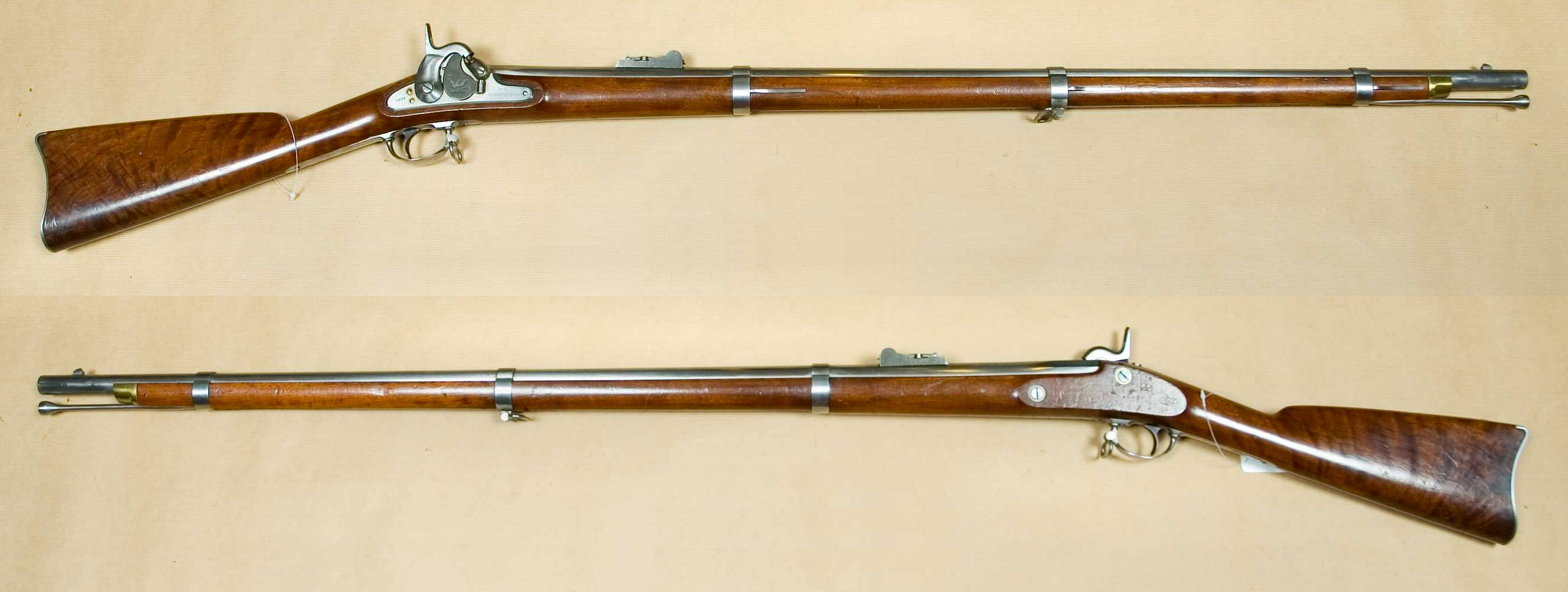
Springfield Model 1855

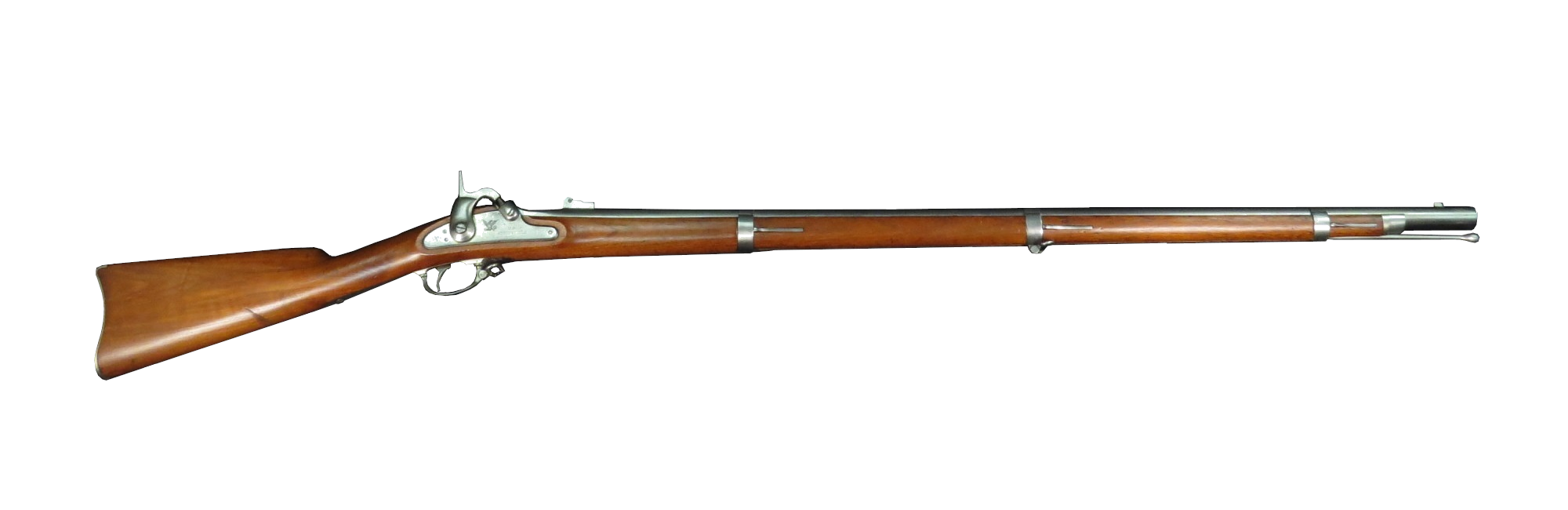
Springfield Model 1861

=== Uniform ===
Initially, the 1st Massachusetts wore the Massachusetts militia uniform which consisted of a dark blue regulation shako, grey shell coat and collar, black shoulder straps, dark blue trousers, and black leather belts, pouches, and straps. By the time of the peninsula campaign, the regiment was wearing standard blue sack coats and sky blue wool trousers.

== Medal of Honor ==
- Nathaniel M. Allen At Gettysburg on 2 July, when his regiment was falling back, already carrying the national color, he returned in the face of the enemy's fire, pulled the regimental flag from under the body of its fallen bearer saving it from capture.

== Flag ==
The regimental flag was made by Daniel Norcross in San Francisco and was presented to Col. Robert Cowdin on June 4, 1861.

== See also ==
- Massachusetts in the Civil War
- List of Massachusetts Civil War units
