= SS Paris City =

A number of steamships were named Paris City, including –

- SS Paris City (1920), a British cargo ship in service 1920–37
- SS Paris City (1941), a British cargo ship in service 1946–54
