= Alden Chester =

New York Supreme Court Justice

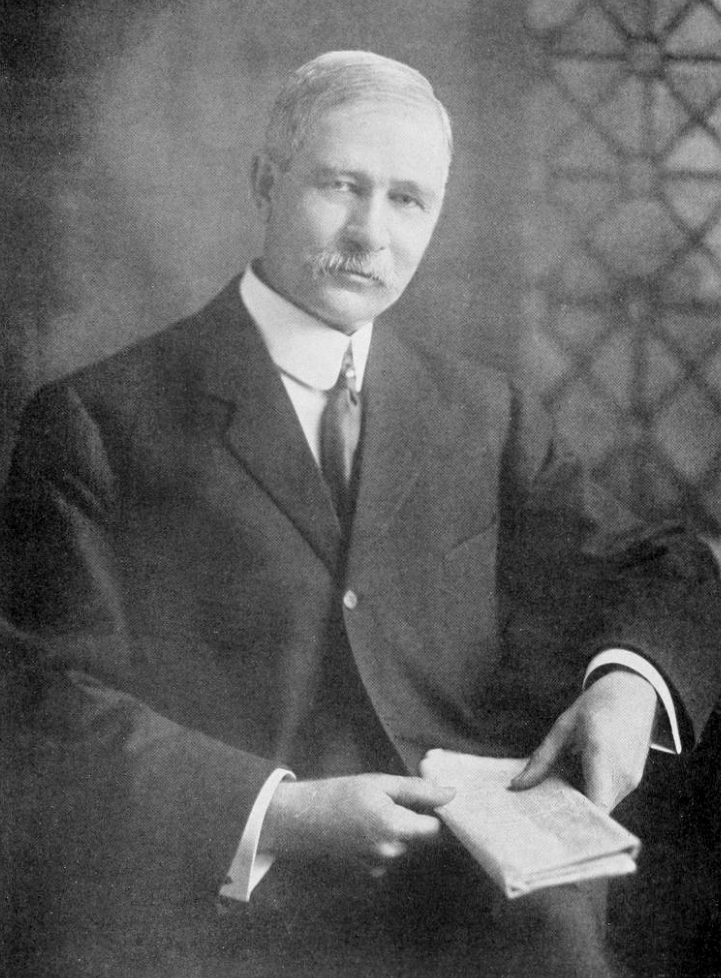

Justice of the New York Supreme Court
- In office 1895–1918

Personal details
- Born: September 4, 1848; Westford, New York
- Died: February 12, 1934 (aged 85); Albany, New York
- Political party: Republican
- Spouse: Lena Thurber (m. 1871)
- Education: Columbia University

Alden Chester (September 4, 1848 - February 12, 1934) was a New York Supreme Court Justice.

== Biography ==
He was born in Westford, New York on September 4, 1848, to Alden Chester and Susan G. Chester (née Draper). He worked as a telegraph operator, a newspaper editor, and an insurance clerk, and then attended Columbia University, graduating with a law degree in 1871, and went into law practice with Andrew Draper. He married Lena Thurber on October 5, 1871.

He was elected Supreme Court Justice as a Republican in October 1895 in the Third Judicial District. He moved to the appellate division from 1902 to 1910. He retired in 1918 when he reached the age limit for the position.

He died at his home in Albany, New York on February 12, 1934. He was survived by his daughter, Amy Chester Merrick.
