= Napoleon B. McLaughlen =

Napoleon Bonaparte McLaughlen
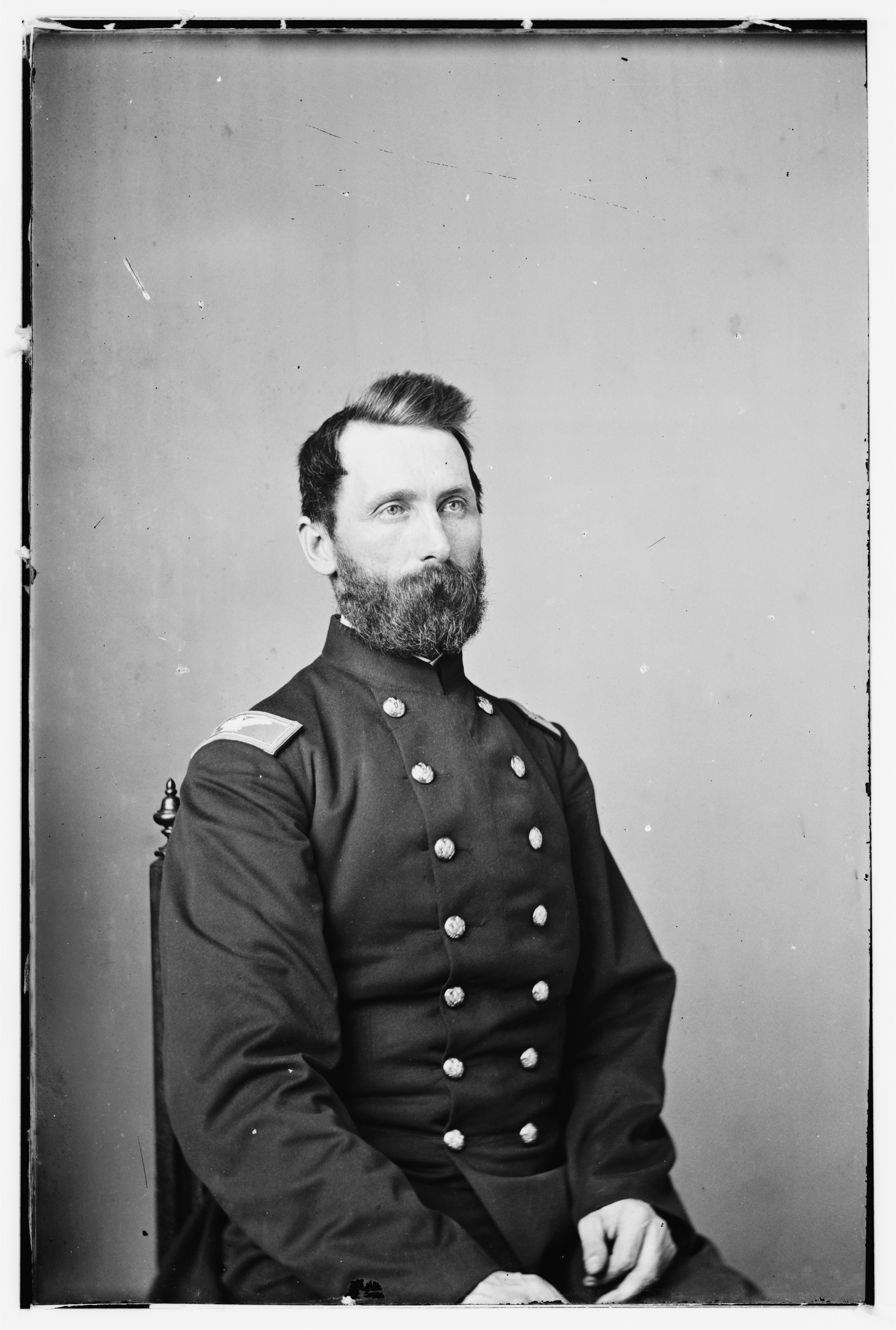
- Civil War–era portrait of McLaughlen.
- Born: December 8, 1823; Chelsea, Vermont
- Died: January 27, 1887 (aged 63); Middletown, New York
- Burial place: Maple Grove Cemetery, Worcester, New York
- Military career
- Allegiance: United States of America; Union
- Branch: United States Army; Union Army
- Service years: 1850–1859; 1861–1882
- Rank: Colonel; Brevet Brigadier General
- Units: 2nd U.S. Dragoons; 1st U.S. Cavalry; 4th U.S. Cavalry; 10th U.S. Cavalry
- Commands: 1st Massachusetts Infantry; 57th Massachusetts Infantry
- Conflicts: American Civil War: Battle of Fredericksburg; Battle of Chancellorsville; Battle of Gettysburg; Battle of Mine Run; Battle of the Wilderness; Battle of Spotsylvania; Battle of Poplar Springs Church; Battle of Fort Stedman

Napoleon Bonaparte McLaughlen (a.k.a. McLaughlin) was a career United States army officer. He served throughout the American Civil War, winning brevet promotions to Brigadier General of both the U.S. Volunteers and the Regular Army.

== Biography ==
McLaughlen was born in Chelsea, Vermont, in 1823. He began his military career as a private in the 2nd U.S. Dragoons. In 1850, he became a Sergeant in that regiment, serving in that capacity before his discharge in 1859.

=== Early Civil War Service ===
In May 1861, he returned to U.S. military service as 1st Lieutenant in the 1st U.S. Cavalry Regiment. He was part of the regular Cavalry service until he was appointed Colonel of the 1st Massachusetts Volunteer Infantry Regiment. In this capacity he fought at Fredericksburg, Chancellorsville, Gettysburg, Mine Run, Wilderness and Spotsylvania. He won brevet promotions to major in the U.S. Army for Chancellorsville and to lieutenant colonel for Gettysburg. He was mustered out of the volunteers service on May 28, 1864.

=== Siege of Petersburg ===
On September 14, 1864, he was appointed Colonel of the 57th Massachusetts Infantry returning to the front lines during the siege of Petersburg. The following day, McLaughlen assumed command of the 3rd Brigade, 1st Division, IX Corps. He led it at the Battle of Poplar Springs Church for which he was given a brevet promotion to brigadier general of U.S. Volunteers, and also fought at the Battle of Boydton Plank Road. During the Winter of 1864-1865, McLaughlen was occasionally in command of the 1st Division, IX Corps.

=== Fort Stedman ===
McLaughlen returned to command of the 3rd Brigade, which manned the line of trenches constituting Fort Stedman. On March 25, 1865, Confederate General John B. Gordon launched a surprise attack against Fort Stedman, overrunning its defenses. McLaughlen moved to the front to rally his brigade. He first inspected Fort Haskell, another defense in his sector. Approving of the situation at Fort Haskell, he rode on to Fort Stedman, not realizing this position was now occupied by Confederate soldiers, who took him prisoner. Despite his capture, he was given a brevet promotion in the U.S. Army to colonel for Fort Stedman, then brigadier general. He was briefly held prisoner in Libby Prison until his release on April 2, 1865. He returned to command his old brigade, which was now manning the defenses of Washington, D.C., before he was mustered out of the volunteer service on August 10, 1865.

=== Post Civil War Service ===
McLaughlen continued serving in the U.S. Army after the Civil War. He was promoted to Major of the 10th U.S. Cavalry in 1876. He retired from active duty in 1882. McLaughlen died in 1887 in Middletown, New York.

== Sources ==
- Appleton's cyclopedia of American biography, Volume 4
- Eicher, John H., & Eicher, David J., Civil War High Commands, Stanford University Press, 2001, ISBN 0-8047-3641-3.
