= Lake Hudson =

Lake Hudson (or Hudson Lake) may refer to the following locations:

- Hudson Lake, Indiana, a small community in Indiana

- Hudson Lake station, a train station in Hudson Lake

- Hudson Lake (New York), a lake in New York
- Lake Hudson (Oklahoma), a reservoir in Oklahoma
- Lake Hudson State Recreation Area, a park in Michigan
