= Sparrowhawk Brook =

Location
- Country: United States
- State: New York
- Region: Central New York Region

Physical characteristics
- Source
  - coordinates: 42°35′59″N 74°48′11″W
- Mouth: Schenevus Creek
  - location: Schenevus, New York, United States
  - coordinates: 42°32′48″N 74°49′35″W
  - elevation: 1,234 ft (376 m)

Sparrowhawk Brook is a creek that flows into Schenevus Creek in Schenevus, New York.
