= Seward Lake =

Lake in Otsego County, New York, United States

- Location of Seward Lake within New York State
- Location: Otsego County, New York
- Coordinates: 42°32′23″N 74°50′27″W
- Primary outflows: Schenevus Creek
- Basin countries: United States
- Surface area: 28 acres (11 ha)
- Surface elevation: 1,237 ft (377 m)
- Settlements: Schenevus

Seward Lake is a small lake in Otsego County, New York. It is located west of Schenevus. Seward Lake drains west via an unnamed stream into Schenevus Creek.
