= Morehouse Brook =

Location
- Country: United States
- State: New York
- Region: Central New York Region

Physical characteristics
- Source
  - coordinates: 42°36′03″N 74°52′01″W
- Mouth: Schenevus Creek
  - location: W of Maryland, New York, United States
  - coordinates: 42°31′46″N 74°53′22″W
  - elevation: 1,165 ft (355 m)

Morehouse Brook is a creek that flows into Schenevus Creek west of Maryland, New York.
