= Potato Creek (Schenevus Creek tributary) =

Location
- Country: United States
- State: New York
- Region: Central New York Region

Physical characteristics
- Source
  - coordinates: 42°32′51″N 74°55′20″W
- Mouth: Schenevus Creek
  - location: ENE of Schenevus, New York, United States
  - coordinates: 42°30′11″N 74°55′31″W
  - elevation: 1,142 ft (348 m)

Potato Creek is a creek that flows into Schenevus Creek east-northeast of Cooperstown Junction, New York.
