= Camp Ellsworth =

American Civil War training camp in Massachusetts

Coordinates: 42.384°N 71.144°W

Camp Ellsworth is a former American Civil War training camp that existed in 1862 in North Cambridge, Massachusetts. It was located near Fresh Pond, at the abandoned Reed and Bartlett Icehouse. It was first occupied by the 1st Regiment Massachusetts Volunteer Infantry on June 1, 1861.

== See also ==
- List of military installations in Massachusetts
