= Twentieth Century Steam Riding Gallery No. 409 =

- U.S. National Register of Historic Places
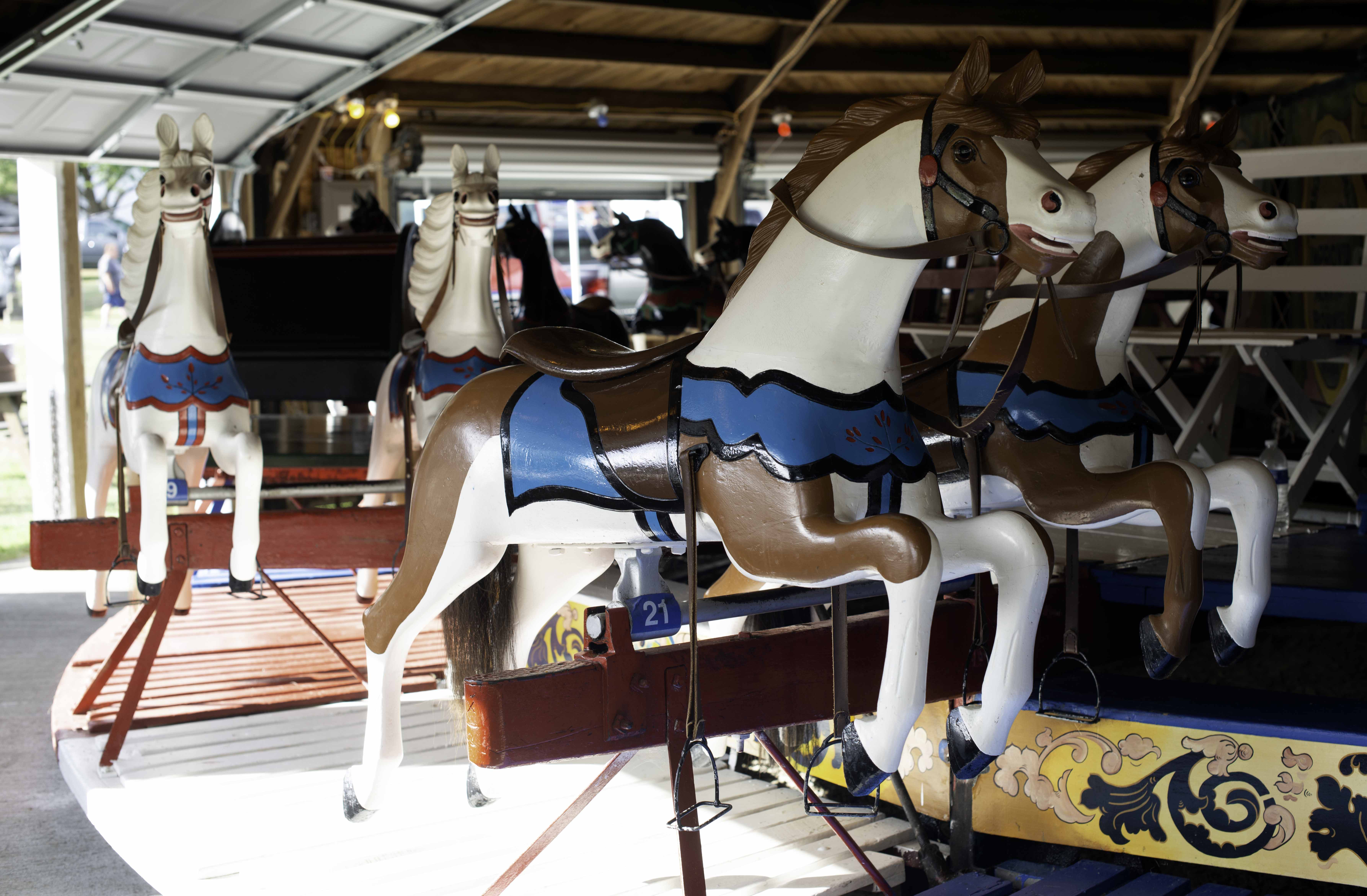

- Location within New York Location within the United States
- Location: Race Street, Schenevus, New York
- Coordinates: 42°32′48″N 74°49′37″W
- Area: 5 acres (2.0 ha)
- Built: 1908
- Architect: Herschell-Spillman Co.
- NRHP reference No.: 97001618
- Added to NRHP: January 16, 1998

Twentieth Century Steam Riding Gallery No. 409, also known as Schenevus Carousel, is a historic carousel located at Schenevus in Otsego County, New York, United States. The carousel and its pavilion were built in 1908. The carousel is housed in a wooden, 16-sided, enclosed pavilion supported in wooden poles and topped by a wooden roof covered with asphalt shingles. The carousel has 24 horses, four chariots, and 16 folding benches. The steam riding gallery type is characterized by horses that rock back and forth, rather than move up and down. It was constructed by the Herschell-Spillman Co.

It was listed on the National Register of Historic Places in 1998.

== See also ==
- Amusement rides on the National Register of Historic Places
- Herschell-Spillman Steam Riding Gallery
- National Register of Historic Places listings in Otsego County, New York
