= Worcester Historic District =

Historic district in New York, United States

- U.S. National Register of Historic Places
- U.S. Historic district
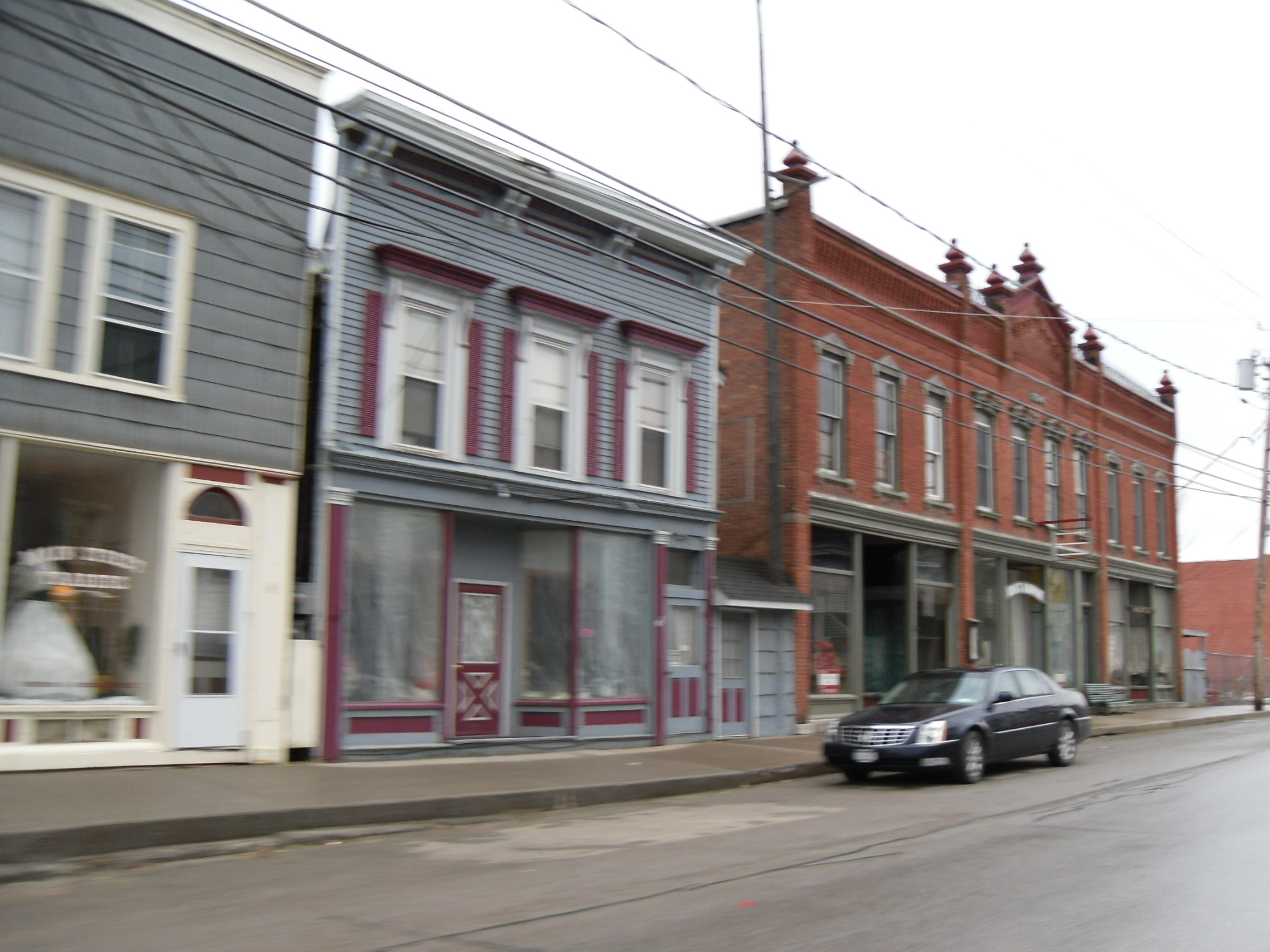
- Worcester Historic District, April 2010

- Location within New York Location within the United States
- Location: Both sides of Main St. (NY 7) between Decatur and Cook Sts., Worcester, New York
- Coordinates: 42°35′31″N 74°45′0″W
- Area: 5 acres (2.0 ha)
- NRHP reference No.: 75001221
- Added to NRHP: June 10, 1975

Worcester Historic District is a national historic district located at Worcester in Otsego County, New York. It encompasses 24 contributing buildings representing the social and economic nucleus of the town. It is composed partially of frame buildings whose street fronts are distinguished by false fronts or "boomtown" facades and a variety of commercial and residential structures.

It was listed on the National Register of Historic Places in 1975.
