= Hudson Lake (New York) =

Body of water

- Location of Hudson Lake within New York State
- Location: Otsego County, New York
- Coordinates: 42°36′14″N 74°41′30″W
- Primary outflows: Schenevus Creek
- Basin countries: United States
- Surface area: 25 acres (10 ha)
- Surface elevation: 1,401 ft (427 m)
- Settlements: East Worcester

Hudson Lake is a small lake in Otsego County, New York. It is located southwest of East Worcester. Hudson Lake drains west via an unnamed stream into Schenevus Creek.
