= Betty and Wilbur Davis State Park =

State park in Otsego County, New York

- Location within New York
- Interactive map of Betty and Wilbur Davis State Park
- Type: State park
- Location: 133 Davis Road; Westford, New York
- Nearest city: Cooperstown, New York
- Coordinates: 42°39′50″N 74°50′00″W
- Area: 223 acres (0.90 km^{2})
- Created: 2001
- Operator: New York State Office of Parks, Recreation and Historic Preservation
- Visitors: 16,246 (in 2020)
- Open: All year
- Website: Betty and Wilbur Davis State Park

Betty and Wilbur Davis State Park is a 223-acre (0.90 km^{2}) state park located in Otsego County, New York. The park is southeast of Cooperstown and is in the northwest corner of the Town of Westford.

The park is named for the New York couple who donated the land, and features forests, open land and two ponds.

== Facilities ==
Betty and Wilbur Davis State Park was opened in 2001, and fully furnished log cabins were added in 2006. The park also features picnic tables and pavilion, ponds for catch and release fishing, hiking trails, and hunting in season. During the winter, the park is available for cross-country skiing and snowshoeing.

== See also ==
- List of New York state parks
