= Oak Creek (New York) =

Location
- Country: United States
- State: New York
- Region: Central New York Region

Physical characteristics
- Source: Bear Swamp Pond
  - coordinates: 42°40′24″N 74°40′29″W
- Mouth: Schenevus Creek
  - location: East Worcester, New York, United States
  - coordinates: 42°36′42″N 74°40′58″W
  - elevation: 1,411 ft (430 m)

Oak Creek is a creek that drains Bear Swamp Pond and flows into Schenevus Creek in East Worcester, New York.
