= 38th Massachusetts Infantry Regiment =

38th Regiment Massachusetts Volunteer Infantry
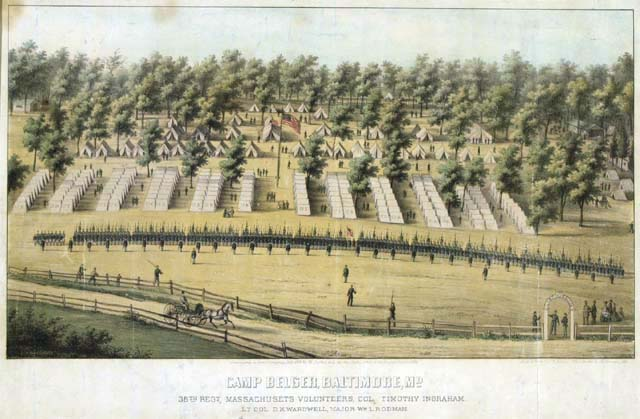
- The 38th Massachusetts on dress parade at Camp Belger near Baltimore, Maryland, September or October 1862.
- Active: August 20, 1862 – July 13, 1865
- Country: United States of America
- Allegiance: Union
- Branch: Union Army
- Type: Infantry
- Part of: In 1863: 3rd Brigade (Gooding's), 3rd Division (Paine's), XIX Corps, Army of the Gulf

Commanders
- Notable commanders: Col. Timothy Ingraham

Insignia
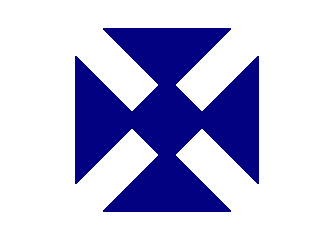
- XIX Corps (3rd Division) badge

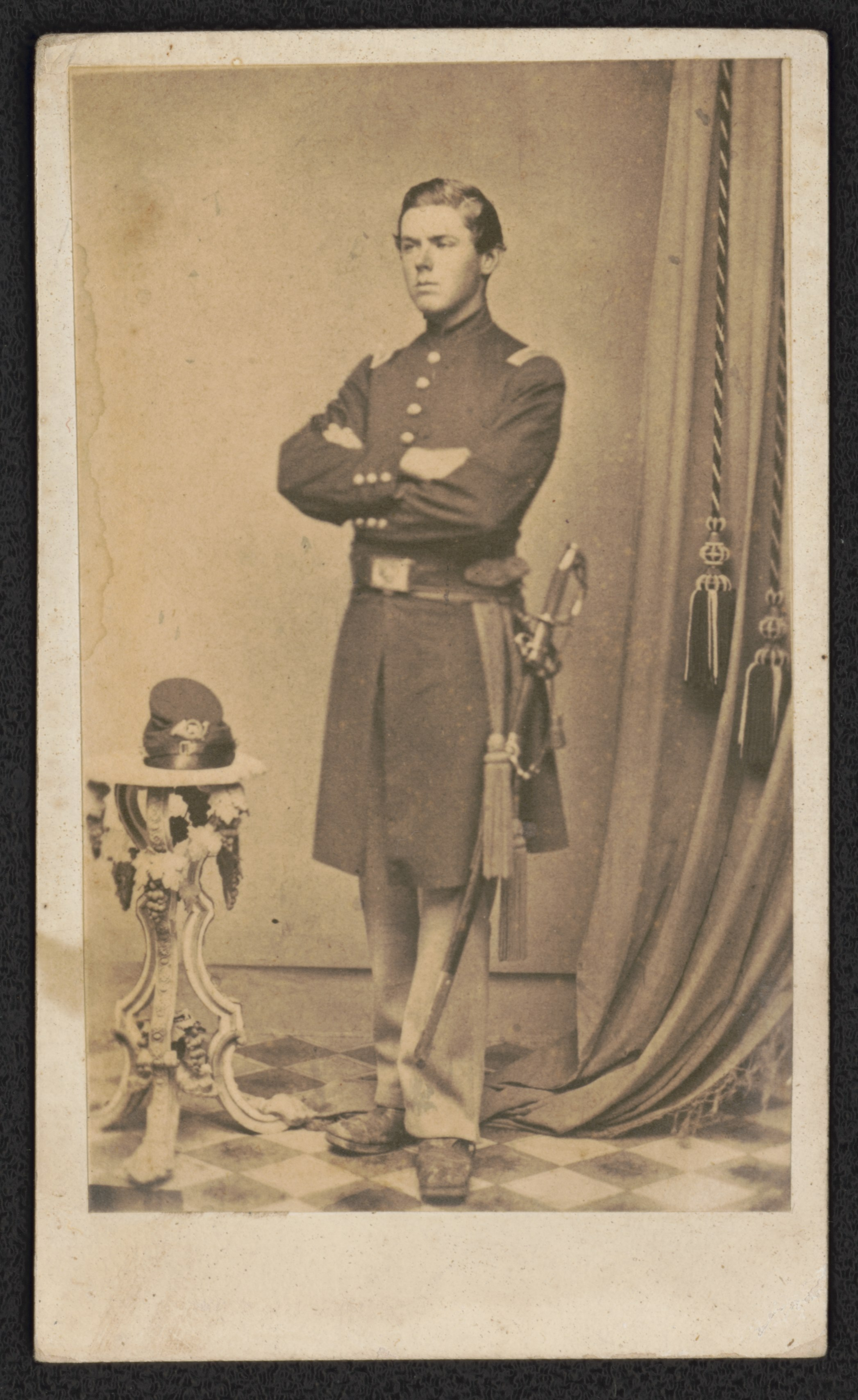
Captain William H. Jewell of Co. A, 38th Massachusetts Infantry Regiment. From the Liljenquist Family Collection of Civil War Photographs, Prints and Photographs Division, Library of Congress

The 38th Regiment Massachusetts Volunteer Infantry was an infantry regiment in the Union Army during the American Civil War. Companies A, B, and C organized at Camp Cameron in Cambridge, Massachusetts in July and August 1862. The remaining seven companies were organized at Camp Stanton in Lynnfield, Massachusetts and mustered into service from August 20 to 22. Colonel Timothy Ingraham initially commanded the regiment.

After two months garrison duty in Baltimore, the regiment embarked for Louisiana, being assigned to the Army of the Gulf which was commanded by Major General Nathaniel P. Banks. The regiment saw its first combat during the Battle of Fort Bisland in southern Louisiana. During May and June 1863, the 38th Massachusetts took part in the Siege of Port Hudson and the assaults on that city on May 27 and June 14, suffering considerable casualties. After the surrender of Port Hudson on July 9, the regiment participated in the ill-fated Red River Campaign.

In July 1864, the XIX Corps, of which the 38th Massachusetts was a part, was transferred to the Shenandoah Valley in Virginia and were attached to the Army of the Shenandoah commanded by Maj. Gen. Philip Sheridan. The 38th Massachusetts was engaged in several battles of the Valley Campaigns of 1864, mostly notably the Third Battle of Winchester on September 19, 1864 and the Battle of Cedar Creek on October 19, 1864 where they suffered significant casualties.

In January 1865, the 38th Massachusetts left the Shenandoah Valley, being transferred to North Carolina. They served guard duty in various locations during the spring of 1865 including Morehead City and Goldsboro. The regiment's 3-year term of service ended in July 1865. Although the war was over, regiments were still needed to serve garrison duty in the South. A portion of the remaining men of the 38th Massachusetts chose to reenlist and were transferred to the 26th Massachusetts. The rest were shipped home and the 38th Massachusetts was mustered out of service on Gallops Island in Boston Harbor on July 13, 1865.

== See also ==
- List of Massachusetts Civil War units
- Massachusetts in the Civil War
