= Herschell-Spillman Steam Riding Gallery =

Restored antique carousel in Madison, South Dakota

- U.S. National Register of Historic Places
- Location: Madison, South Dakota
- Coordinates: 44.0068°N 97.1675°W
- Built: c. 1903
- NRHP reference No.: 16000825
- Added to NRHP: December 6, 2016

The Herschell-Spillman Steam Riding Gallery is an antique carousel at the Prairie Village living history museum in Madison, South Dakota. It was built c. 1903 and was added to the National Register of Historic Places in 2016.

== See also ==
- Amusement rides on the National Register of Historic Places
- National Register of Historic Places listings in Lake County, South Dakota
- Twentieth Century Steam Riding Gallery No. 409
