= Potato River =

Potato River may refer to:

- Potato River (Michigan), a tributary of Lake Superior
- Potato River (Minnesota), a tributary of the Fish Hook River
- Potato River (Wisconsin), a tributary of the Bad River

== See also ==
- Potato Creek (disambiguation)
