= South Worcester Historic District =

Historic district in New York, United States

- U.S. National Register of Historic Places
- U.S. Historic district
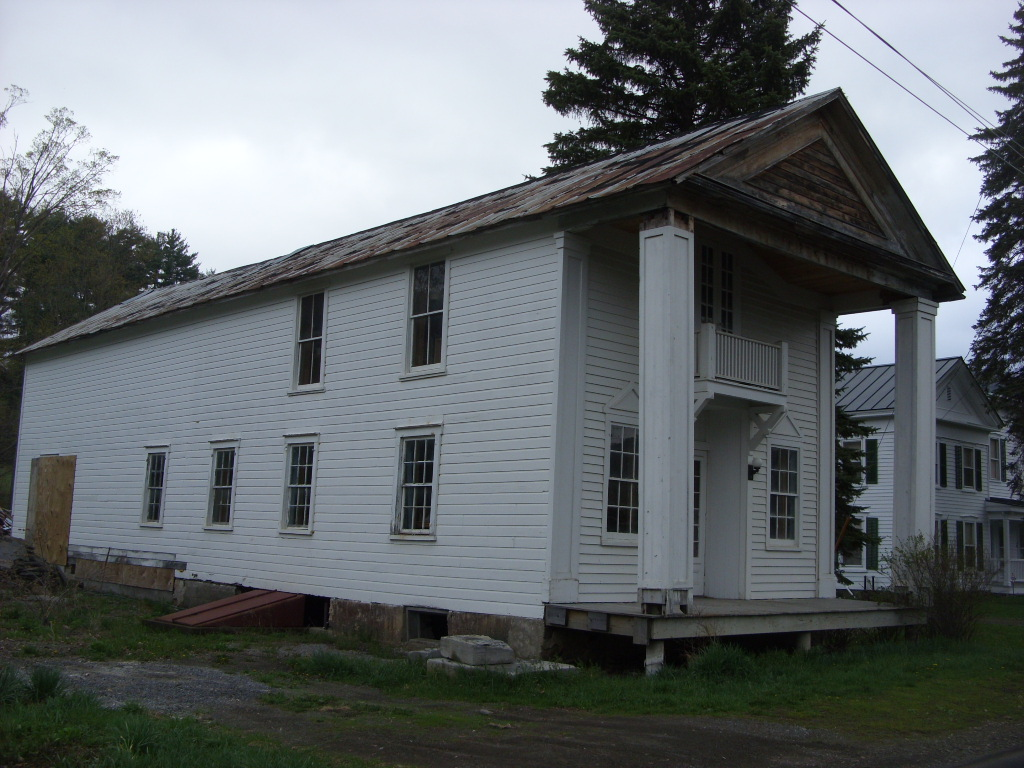
- Town Hall, May 2009

- Location within New York Location within the United States
- Location: Jct. of Co. Rt. 40 and Co. Rt. 39 and W along 40, South Worcester, New York
- Coordinates: 42°31′1″N 74°45′25″W
- Area: 633 acres (256 ha)
- Architectural style: Greek Revival, Italianate, Federal
- NRHP reference No.: 92001563
- Added to NRHP: November 5, 1992

South Worcester Historic District is a national historic district located at South Worcester in Otsego County, New York. It encompasses 41 contributing buildings and three contributing sites in this rural hamlet. It is composed primarily of 19th and early 20th century frame residences and outbuildings representing typical vernacular interpretations of popular national styles for the period from about 1810 to 1942.

It was listed on the National Register of Historic Places in 1992.

== Gallery ==
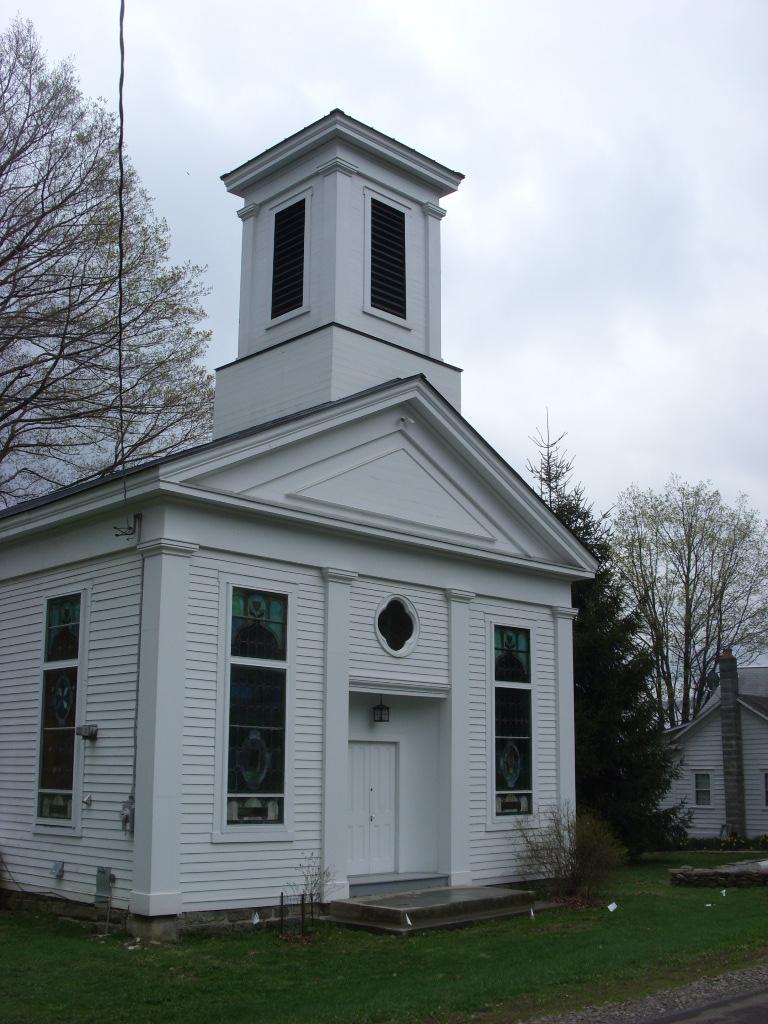
Methodist Church, May 2009
