= Whitney Brook (New York) =

Location
- Country: United States
- State: New York
- Region: Central New York Region

Physical characteristics
- Source
  - coordinates: 42°34′18″N 74°51′47″W
- Mouth: Schenevus Creek
  - location: Maryland, New York, United States
  - coordinates: 42°32′07″N 74°53′05″W
  - elevation: 1,178 ft (359 m)

Whitney Brook is a creek that flows into Schenevus Creek in Maryland, New York.
