= Westford, Wisconsin =

Westford is the name of some places in the U.S. state of Wisconsin:

- Westford, Dodge County, Wisconsin
- Westford, Richland County, Wisconsin
