= Camp Cameron =

American Civil War training camp in Massachusetts

Coordinates: 42.3993°N 71.1286°W

Camp Cameron was an American Civil War training camp that existed in 1861–1862 in North Cambridge, Massachusetts. It was used for the initial organization of elements of the 38th Massachusetts Infantry Regiment. It was probably named for Simon Cameron, Lincoln's first secretary of war. Other units that trained here included the 1st, 11th, 16th, 26th, and 28th regiments of Massachusetts infantry, and the 1st and 8th batteries of light artillery. It was located near Massachusetts Avenue, and was also known at one point as Camp Day after the family that owned the land. Cameron Avenue and Camp Street are named for the camp, and several nearby streets were named after battles.

== See also ==
- List of military installations in Massachusetts
