= Worcester (CDP), New York =

Worcester, New York
- Census-designated place
- Location within the state of New York
- Coordinates: 42°35′30″N 74°45′1″W
- Country: United States
- State: New York
- County: Otsego
- Town: Worcester

Area
  - Total: 8.61 sq mi (22.30 km^{2})
  - Land: 8.56 sq mi (22.18 km^{2})
  - Water: 0.046 sq mi (0.12 km^{2})
- Elevation: 1,330 ft (410 m)

Population (2020)
  - Total: 986
  - Density: 115.1/sq mi (44.45/km^{2})
- Time zone: UTC-5 (Eastern (EST))
  - Summer (DST): UTC-4 (EDT)
- Area code: 607
- FIPS code: 36-83118

Worcester is a census-designated place (CDP) forming the central settlement of the town of Worcester in Otsego County, New York, United States. The population of the CDP was 986 at the 2020 census.

== Geography ==
Worcester is located at 42°35′30″N 74°45′1″W (42.59172, -74.75050), along New York State Route 7. Interstate 88 skirts the south edge of the CDP, serving the community via Exit 19, one mile (1.6 km) east of the CDP center.

According to the United States Census Bureau, the CDP has a total area of 8.6 square miles (22.3 km^{2}), of which 8.6 square miles (22.2 km^{2}) is land and 0.039 square miles (0.1 km^{2}), or 0.53%, is water.

== Demographics ==
Historical population
Census	Pop.	Note	%±
2020	986		—
U.S. Decennial Census
