= Decatur, New York =

- Town
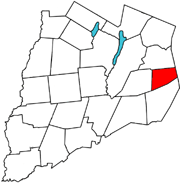
- Decatur, Otsego County, NY
- Coordinates: 42°40′13″N 74°42′4″W
- Country: United States
- State: New York
- County: Otsego

Area
  - Total: 20.76 sq mi (53.76 km^{2})
  - Land: 20.56 sq mi (53.26 km^{2})
  - Water: 0.20 sq mi (0.51 km^{2})
- Elevation: 2,100 ft (640 m)

Population (2010)
  - Total: 353
  - Estimate (2016): 339
  - Density: 16.5/sq mi (6.37/km^{2})
- Time zone: UTC-5 (Eastern (EST))
  - Summer (DST): UTC-4 (EDT)
- ZIP code: 12197
- Area code: 607
- FIPS code: 36-19895
- GNIS feature ID: 0978890

The Town of Decatur is located on the eastern border of Otsego County, New York, United States. As of 2020 census, the population was 374, up from 353 at the 2010 census. It is named after the popular early-American naval hero Stephen Decatur.

== History ==
Early settlers began arriving in 1790, settling at the present Decatur village. Decatur was formed from part of the Town of Worcester in 1808. Its surface is hilly, broken by narrow valleys. The principal streams are Oak and Parker Creek, a tributary to the Schenevus. The first settlement was made in 1790 by Jacob Kinney near the present village of Decatur. The first merchant in the town was Nahum Thompson, who was a member of the assembly in 1844. The first supervisor was David Tripp, and the first town clerk was Lemuel Fletcher. Samuel Turber taught the first school in about the year 1798. The first grist mill was erected by John Champion, the grandfather of S.B. Champion, editor of the Stamford Mirror. James Stewart built the first carding mill.

Jacob Brown and his son Jacob came from Columbia county in 1787. Nathan and Gardner Boorn were early settlers. Amos, a son of Gardner, was supervisor for six years. The brothers Elisha, John and Samuel Waterman, came from Norwich, Connecticut, soon after the Revolution. From Elisha was descended Lewis Edson Waterman, inventor of the "Waterman Ideal Fountain Pen", who was born in Decatur in 1837, and died in Brooklyn, New York in 1901.

== Geography ==
According to the United States Census Bureau, the town has a total area of 20.8 square miles (54 km^{2}), of which 20.6 square miles (53 km^{2}) is land and 0.2 square miles (0.52 km^{2}) (0.87%) is water.

The eastern town line is the border of Schoharie County.

== Notable people ==
- John Van Voorhis, former US Congressman
- Bruce Ritter, Roman Catholic Priest and former Franciscan friar, founder of Covenant House

== Demographics ==
Historical population
Census	Pop.	Note	%±
1820	926		—
1830	1,110		19.9%
1840	1,071		−3.5%
1850	927		−13.4%
1860	902		−2.7%
1870	802		−11.1%
1880	779		−2.9%
1890	597		−23.4%
1900	559		−6.4%
1910	476		−14.8%
1920	422		−11.3%
1930	336		−20.4%
1940	324		−3.6%
1950	279		−13.9%
1960	254		−9.0%
1970	281		10.6%
1980	312		11.0%
1990	356		14.1%
2000	410		15.2%
2010	353		−13.9%
2016 (est.)	339		−4.0%
U.S. Decennial Census

As of the census of 2000, there were 410 people, 158 households, and 117 families residing in the town. The population density was 19.9 inhabitants per square mile (7.7/km^{2}). There were 281 housing units at an average density of 13.6 per square mile (5.3/km^{2}). The racial makeup of the town was 98.78% White, 0.24% African American, 0.24% Asian, 0.49% from other races, and 0.24% from two or more races. Hispanic or Latino of any race were 1.46% of the population.

There were 158 households, out of which 29.1% had children under the age of 18 living with them, 66.5% were married couples living together, 4.4% had a female householder with no husband present, and 25.9% were non-families. 19.6% of all households were made up of individuals, and 10.1% had someone living alone who was 65 years of age or older. The average household size was 2.59 and the average family size was 2.99.

In the town, the population was spread out, with 23.9% under the age of 18, 6.1% from 18 to 24, 23.7% from 25 to 44, 29.0% from 45 to 64, and 17.3% who were 65 years of age or older. The median age was 42 years. For every 100 females, there were 115.8 males. For every 100 females age 18 and over, there were 105.3 males.

The median income for a household in the town was $29,896, and the median income for a family was $38,125. Males had a median income of $29,219 versus $21,458 for females. The per capita income for the town was $16,541. About 2.6% of families and 4.4% of the population were below the poverty line, including 7.8% of those under age 18 and none of those age 65 or over.

== Communities and locations in Decatur ==
- Algerine Hill – An elevation south of Furnaceville.
- Bear Swamp Pond – A small pond on the northern town line.
- Decatur – The hamlet of Decator is located at the junction of County Roads 37 and 39 and Decatur Creek.
- Elliot Hill – An elevation east of Gothicville.
- Furnaceville – A hamlet in the southeastern part of the town.
- Gothicville – A hamlet in the northeastern part of the town on County Road 38.
