= SS Empire Baxter =

World War II merchant ship of the United Kingdom

History
- Name: Empire Baxter (1941–46); Paris City (1946–54); Westford (1954–58); Severn River (1958–59); Hüseyin Kaptan (1959–63)
- Owner: Ministry of War Transport (1941–46); Reardon Smith Line Ltd (1946–54); Duff, Herbert & Mitchell Ltd (1954–58); Compagnia Atlantica-Pacifica (1958–59); R & E Sadikoğlu Ortaktarı (1959–63)
- Operator: Haldin & Phillips Ltd (1941–43); Reardon Smith Line Ltd (1943–54); Duff, Herbert & Mitchell Ltd (1954–58); Compagnia Atlantica-Pacifica (1958–59); R & E Sadikoğlu Ortaktarı (1959–63)
- Port of registry: (United Kingdom) Barrow in Furness (1941–46); (United Kingdom) Bideford (1946–54); (United Kingdom) London (1954–58); Liberia (1958–59); Turkey (1959–63)
- Builder: Vickers Armstrongs Ltd, Barrow in Furness
- Launched: 8 October 1941
- Completed: December 1941
- Identification: UK Official Number 167740 (1941–58); Code Letters BCSJ (1941–58)
- Fate: Scrapped 1963

General characteristics
- Tonnage: 7,024 GRT
- Length: 433 ft (131.98 m)
- Beam: 56 ft 2 in (17.12 m)
- Depth: 34 ft 4 in (10.46 m)
- Propulsion: Triple expansion steam engine 516 hp (385 kW)
- Speed: 9 knots (17 km/h)
- Armament: 1 x 4" gun, 1 x 3" gun, 1 x machine gun (Empire Baxter)

Empire Baxter was a 7,024 GRT cargo ship which was built by Vickers Armstrongs Ltd, Barrow in Furness in 1941. Postwar she served as Paris City, Westford, Severn River and Hüseyin Kaptan before she was scrapped at Haliç, Turkey in June 1963.

== Career ==
Empire Baxter was built by Vickers-Armstrongs Ltd, Barrow in Furness, Lancashire. She was launched on 8 October 1941 and completed in December that year. She was built for the Ministry of War Transport and placed under the management of Haldin & Phillips Ltd. Her port of registry was Barrow in Furness.

=== War service ===
Empire Baxter was a member of a number of Convoys during the Second World War.

KMS 2

Convoy KMS 2 sailed from Loch Ewe on 25 October 1942 and Liverpool and the Clyde on 26 October. The convoy arrived at Gibraltar on 10 November, Oran on 11 November and Algiers on 12 November. Empire Baxter was carrying 8 tons of stores and ten troops.

ON 158

Convoy ON 158 sailed from Liverpool on 2 January 1943 and arrived at New York on 23 January. She was carrying the convoy commodore, Henry S Allan RNVR and was bound for Portland. The convoy encountered a severe gale off Sable Island with Empire Baxter losing two lifeboats and two others being badly damaged. Her radio and other signalling equipment was damaged by ice accretion. She arrived at Portland on 24 January.

In 1943, Empire Baxter was placed under the management of Sir William Reardon Smith & Sons Ltd.

MKS 56

Convoy MKS 56 sailed from Port Said, Egypt on 18 July 1944 and arrived at Gibraltar on 29 July. Empire Baxter was carrying a general cargo and was bound for Algiers.

KMS 88

Convoy KMS 88 sailed from Liverpool on 3 March 1945 and arrived at Gibraltar on 11 March. Empire Baxter was carrying a general cargo from the Clyde and was bound for Algiers.

=== Postwar service ===
In 1946, Empire Baxter was purchased from the MoWT by Sir William Reardon Smith & Sons Ltd and renamed Paris City, the second ship to carry that name for Reardon Smith's. Her port of registry was changed to Bideford She was sold in 1954 to Duff Herbert & Mitchell Ltd and renamed Westford. Her port of registry was changed to London. In 1957 she was sold to Tidewater Commercial, Liberia and renamed Severn River. In 1959 she was sold to R & A Sadikoğlu, Turkey and renamed Hüseyin Kaptan. She was scrapped in Haliç in June 1963.

== Official Numbers and Code Letters ==
Official numbers were a forerunner to IMO Numbers. Empire Baxter had the UK Official Number 167740 and used the Code Letters BCSJ.
