= Westford, New York =

- Town
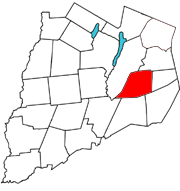
- Otsego County map with the Town of Westford in red
- Coordinates: 42°38′N 74°48′W
- Country: United States
- State: New York
- County: Otsego

Area
  - Total: 33.91 sq mi (87.82 km^{2})
  - Land: 33.85 sq mi (87.68 km^{2})
  - Water: 0.054 sq mi (0.14 km^{2})
- Elevation: 1,594 ft (486 m)

Population (2010)
  - Total: 868
  - Estimate (2016): 830
  - Density: 24.5/sq mi (9.47/km^{2})
- Time zone: UTC-5 (Eastern (EST))
  - Summer (DST): UTC-4 (EDT)
- ZIP code: 13488
- Area code: 607
- FIPS code: 36-79972
- GNIS feature ID: 0979622
- Website: www.westfordny.com

Westford is a town in Otsego County, New York, United States. The population was 868 at the 2010 census. It is southeast of Cooperstown.

== History ==
The town was first settled around 1790 by pioneers from Vermont. However, it is claimed that the first settler in Westford was Robert Roseboom from New Jersey, who settled in what is now known as Maple Valley. During the 1790s, Westford received an influx of land-hungry settlers from New England, who established the first churches and schools in Westford.

The town was established from part of the town of Worcester in 1808.

== Geography ==
According to the United States Census Bureau, the town has a total area of 33.8 square miles (88 km^{2}), of which 33.8 square miles (88 km^{2}) is land and 0.04 square miles (0.10 km^{2}) (0.06%) is water.

Elk Creek drains the town, flowing southward. Cherry Creek in Cherry Creek Valley flows through the southwestern part of Westford.

== Demographics ==
Historical population
Census	Pop.	Note	%±
1820	1,526		—
1830	1,645		7.8%
1840	1,478		−10.2%
1850	1,423		−3.7%
1860	1,382		−2.9%
1870	1,300		−5.9%
1880	1,271		−2.2%
1890	1,023		−19.5%
1900	910		−11.0%
1910	803		−11.8%
1920	735		−8.5%
1930	652		−11.3%
1940	685		5.1%
1950	602		−12.1%
1960	526		−12.6%
1970	435		−17.3%
1980	652		49.9%
1990	634		−2.8%
2000	784		23.7%
2010	868		10.7%
2016 (est.)	830	▼	−4.4%
U.S. Decennial Census

As of the census of 2000, there were 784 people, 306 households, and 215 families residing in the town. The population density was 23.2 inhabitants per square mile (9.0/km^{2}). There were 446 housing units at an average density of 13.2 per square mile (5.1/km^{2}). The racial makeup of the town was 98.09% White, 0.26% African American, 0.13% Asian, 0.38% Pacific Islander, 0.13% from other races, and 1.02% from two or more races. Hispanic or Latino people of any race were 1.91% of the population.

There were 306 households, out of which 30.4% had children under the age of 18 living with them, 55.9% were married couples living together, 8.5% had a female householder with no husband present, and 29.7% were non-families. 23.5% of all households were made up of individuals, and 10.1% had someone living alone who was 65 years of age or older. The average household size was 2.56 and the average family size was 3.00.

In the town, the population was spread out, with 25.5% under the age of 18, 6.6% from 18 to 24, 26.1% from 25 to 44, 26.7% from 45 to 64, and 15.1% who were 65 years of age or older. The median age was 40 years. For every 100 females, there were 99.0 males. For every 100 females age 18 and over, there were 96.6 males.

The median income for a household in the town was $34,318, and the median income for a family was $38,611. Males had a median income of $29,375 versus $22,237 for females. The per capita income for the town was $16,351. About 6.8% of families and 9.2% of the population were below the poverty line, including 8.0% of those under age 18 and 13.2% of those age 65 or over.

== Communities and locations in Westford ==
- Badeau Hill – an elevation located southwest of Westford
- Bentley Hollow – a former location in Westford
- Betty and Wilbur Davis State Park – The state park is in the northwestern part of the town.
- Darling Hill – an elevation located west of Westford
- Elk Creek – an important stream flowing out the south of the town
- Hooker Mountain Wildlife Management Area – a conservation area in the southwestern part of town
- Hubbard Settlement – a former location in Westford
- Maple Valley – a hamlet in the northern part of Westford on County Road 34
- Westford – The hamlet of Westford is near the center of the town.
- Westville – a hamlet at the junction of County Roads 35 and 42 by the western town line
