= Schenevus, New York =

- Hamlet and CDP
- Location within the state of New York
- Coordinates: 42°32′56″N 74°49′15″W
- Country: United States
- State: New York
- County: Otsego
- Town: Maryland
- Settled: 1793
- Incorporated: June 6, 1870
- Dissolved: December 31, 1994

Area
  - Total: 1.0 sq mi (2.7 km^{2})
  - Land: 1.0 sq mi (2.7 km^{2})
  - Water: 0 sq mi (0.0 km^{2})
- Elevation: 1,266 ft (386 m)

Population (2010)
  - Total: 551
  - Density: 530/sq mi (200/km^{2})
- Time zone: UTC-5 (Eastern (EST))
  - Summer (DST): UTC-4 (EDT)
- ZIP code: 12155

Schenevus is a hamlet (and census-designated place) in the town of Maryland in southeastern Otsego County, New York, United States. As of the 2020 census, Schenevus had a population of 494. The Schenevus Central School district home of covers the towns of Maryland, Westford, Milford, Decatur and Roseboom. The Schenevus Carousel and Twentieth Century Steam Riding Gallery No. 409 are listed on the National Register of Historic Places.

New York State Route 7 runs through the center of Schenevus, and Interstate 88 passes just to the south, serving the CDP via exit 18.

Schenevus was an incorporated village from 1870 to 1994.
