= Worcester, New York =

- Town
- Location within the state of New York
- Coordinates: 42°36′N 74°43′W
- Country: United States
- State: New York
- County: Otsego

Area
  - Total: 46.87 sq mi (121.40 km^{2})
  - Land: 46.71 sq mi (120.98 km^{2})
  - Water: 0.16 sq mi (0.42 km^{2})
- Elevation: 2,260 ft (689 m)

Population (2010)
  - Total: 2,220
  - Estimate (2016): 2,117
  - Density: 45/sq mi (17.5/km^{2})
- Time zone: UTC-5 (Eastern (EST))
  - Summer (DST): UTC-4 (EDT)
- ZIP code: 12197
- Area code: 607
- FIPS code: 36-83129
- GNIS feature ID: 0979656
- Website: townofworcesterny.gov

Worcester is a town in Otsego County, New York, United States. The population was 2,220 at the 2010 census. Worcester is on the southeastern border of the county and is northeast of Oneonta. The Worcester Central School District presently has 369 students enrolled in grades K-12.

== History ==
Settlement began on Schenevus Creek around 1788. The town was established from part of the town of Cherry Valley in 1797. In 1808, the towns of Decatur, Maryland, and Westford were formed from part of Worcester.

== Geography ==
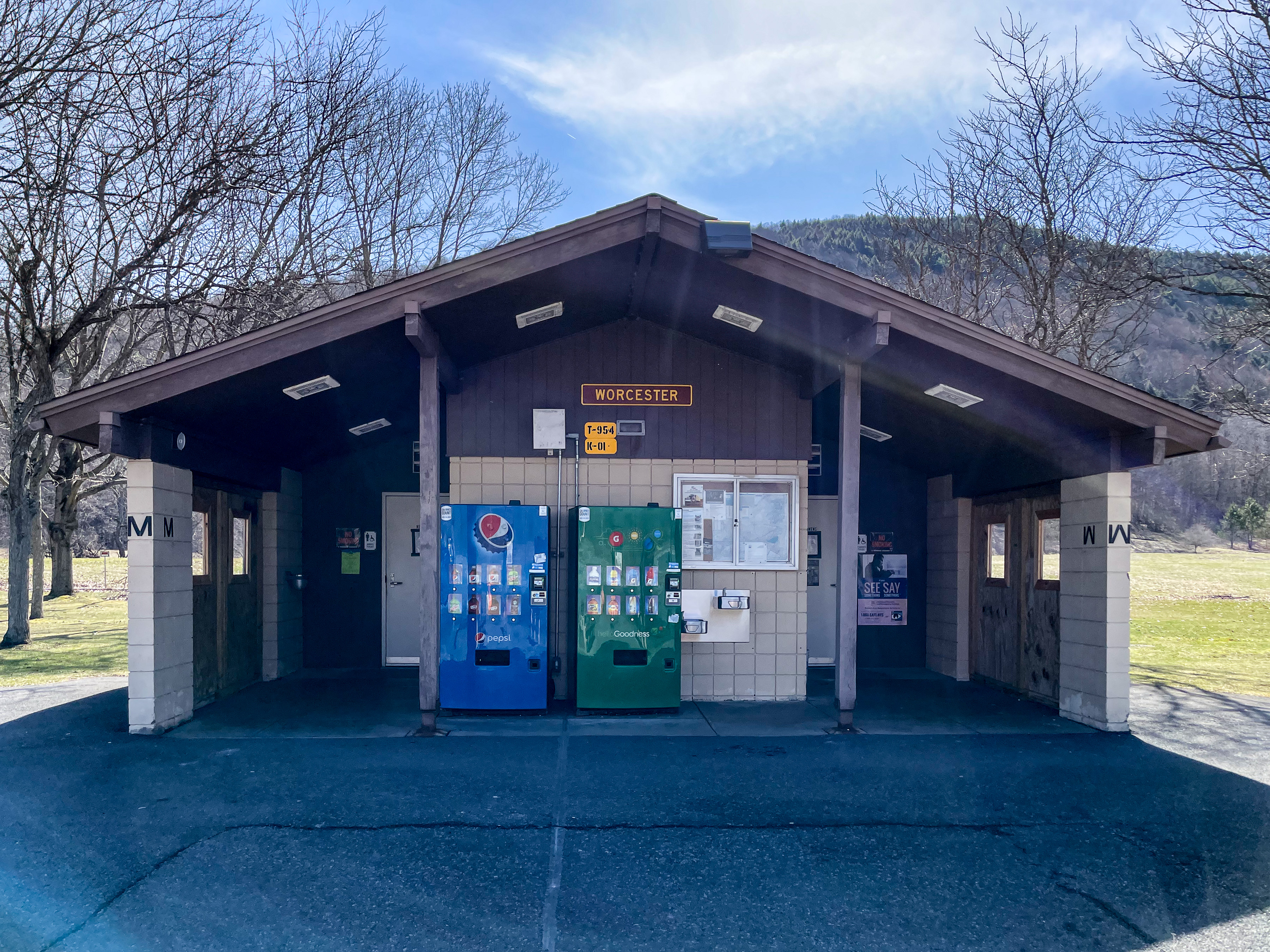
Worcester rest area on Interstate 88

According to the United States Census Bureau, the town has a total area of 46.9 square miles (121 km^{2}), of which 46.7 square miles (121 km^{2}) is land and 0.2 square miles (0.52 km^{2}) (0.32%) is water. Interstate 88 passes through the central part of the town, following the same course as New York State Route 7. Both highways follow the course of Schenevus Creek across the town. The southern town line is the border of Delaware and Schoharie counties. The highest point in Otsego County is located near the eastern border of the town, east of East Worcester.

The East Worcester Fish and Game Club is in the East Worcester-Decatur area. It is known to locals as "The Lake", which is home to a variety of different fish that are native to the area and is a popular location for fishing. The club also holds many functions such as fishing derbies, cook outs, clam bakes, and dances.

== Demographics ==
Historical population
| Census | Pop. | Note | %± |
|---|---|---|---|
| 1820 | 1,958 | | — |
| 1830 | 2,093 | | 6.9% |
| 1840 | 2,390 | | 14.2% |
| 1850 | 2,047 | | −14.4% |
| 1860 | 2,154 | | 5.2% |
| 1870 | 2,327 | | 8.0% |
| 1880 | 2,513 | | 8.0% |
| 1890 | 2,741 | | 9.1% |
| 1900 | 2,409 | | −12.1% |
| 1910 | 2,185 | | −9.3% |
| 1920 | 2,136 | | −2.2% |
| 1930 | 1,946 | | −8.9% |
| 1940 | 2,038 | | 4.7% |
| 1950 | 2,098 | | 2.9% |
| 1960 | 1,946 | | −7.2% |
| 1970 | 1,925 | | −1.1% |
| 1980 | 1,993 | | 3.5% |
| 1990 | 2,070 | | 3.9% |
| 2000 | 2,207 | | 6.6% |
| 2010 | 2,220 | | 0.6% |
| 2016 (est.) | 2,117 | ▼ | −4.6% |
U.S. Decennial Census

As of the census of 2000, there were 2,207 people, 911 households, and 600 families residing in the town. The population density was 47.2 inhabitants per square mile (18.2/km^{2}). There were 1,201 housing units at an average density of 25.7 units per square mile (9.9 units/km^{2}). The racial makeup of the town was 97.46% White, 0.59% African American, 0.50% Native American, 0.23% Asian, 0.23% from other races, and 1.00% from two or more races. Hispanic or Latino of any race were 0.95% of the population.

There were 911 households, out of which 29.2% had children under the age of 18 living with them, 52.7% were married couples living together, 9.0% had a female householder with no husband present, and 34.1% were non-families. 28.3% of all households were made up of individuals, and 14.3% had someone living alone who was 65 years of age or older. The average household size was 2.41 and the average family size was 2.94.

In the town, the population was spread out, with 24.9% under the age of 18, 6.3% from 18 to 24, 25.6% from 25 to 44, 26.6% from 45 to 64, and 16.6% who were 65 years of age or older. The median age was 41 years. For every 100 females, there were 92.4 males. For every 100 females age 18 and over, there were 91.9 males.

The median income for a household in the town was $30,506, and the median income for a family was $35,903. Males had a median income of $28,102 versus $19,583 for females. The per capita income for the town was $15,752. About 7.4% of families and 10.3% of the population were below the poverty line, including 14.5% of those under age 18 and 9.1% of those age 65 or over.

== Communities and locations ==
- Barton Corners – A hamlet near the southern town line, northeast of South Worcester.
- Brighton – A location east of Worcester hamlet.
- Calcutta – A location north of East Worcester on County Route 38.
- Caryl Lake – A small lake west on a hill northeast of Worcester hamlet; former water supply; named for Isaac Caryl, a settler.
- East Worcester – A hamlet in the eastern part of Worcester on NY-7.
- Hudson Lake – A small lake south of Schenevus Creek.
- Lutheranville Hill – Highest elevation in Otsego County, east of East Worcester between Brooker Hollow Road and the county line.
- Pine Hill – An elevation located northeast of South Worcester.
- Pine Mountain – An elevation in the northeastern corner of Worcester.
- South Hill – An elevation in the west-central part of Worcester.
- South Worcester – A hamlet at the southern town line on County Route 39 and Charlotte Creek. The South Worcester Historic District was listed on the National Register of Historic Places in 1992.
- Strain Mountain – An elevation in the southern part of the town, northeast of South Worcester.
- Stone Quarry Hill – An elevation located northwest of East Worcester.
- Tuscan – A location west of Worcester hamlet.
- Worcester – A hamlet located on NY-7 and Schenevus Creek in the western part of the town. The Worcester Historic District was listed on the National Register of Historic Places in 1975.
- Snob's Knob – A section of town deemed "affluent".

== Notable person ==
- Mary Gage Day (1857–1935), physician, medical writer

== In popular culture ==
Location of the convenience store in the season 1 Mr. Show with Bob and David sketch "Change for a Dollar"
