= New Lisbon, New York =

- Town
- Seal

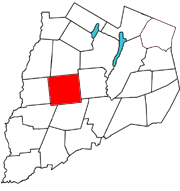
- Otsego County map with the Town of New Lisbon in red
- Coordinates: 42°36′N 75°10′W
- Country: United States
- State: New York
- County: Otsego

Area
  - Total: 44.66 sq mi (115.68 km^{2})
  - Land: 44.36 sq mi (114.90 km^{2})
  - Water: 0.30 sq mi (0.78 km^{2})
- Elevation: 1,713 ft (522 m)

Population (2010)
  - Total: 1,114
  - Estimate (2016): 1,060
  - Density: 23.9/sq mi (9.23/km^{2})
- Time zone: UTC-5 (Eastern (EST))
  - Summer (DST): UTC-4 (EDT)
- ZIP code: 13415
- Area code: 607
- FIPS code: 36-50485
- GNIS feature ID: 0979268
- Website: townofnewlisbonny.gov

New Lisbon is a town in Otsego County, New York, United States. The population was 1,114 at the 2010 census.

The Town of New Lisbon is in the west-central part of the county. It is north of the City of Oneonta.

== History ==
The town was first settled circa 1773, but most pioneers did not enter the area until after the Revolutionary War. It is mentioned that a cultivated apple orchard was found by early settlers on the west side of the Butternut Creek near Noblesville, presumably planted by Native Americans.

The town was formed from part of Pittsfield in 1806, but was then called "Lisbon." The name was changed to "New Lisbon" in 1808. Spafford's 1810 Gazetteer says, "There are in all four or five grain-mills, seven saw-mills, a fulling-mill, and carding machine. There is one Baptist meeting house and seven schoolhouses. The inhabitants are principally farmers, and their household manufactures supply the most of their common clothing. In 1810 the whole population was 1982." In 1878, the town is listed as having 26,899 acres, 21,619 of it improved, 5822 woodland, and 200 "other". Valuation was $586,250 and equalized $459,973.

In 1878, Garrattsville contained two churches, three general stores, a hardware stores, saw and gristmill, hotel, wagon shop, and five blacksmiths. For a few years there was an annual fair held on the flat along the Butternut Creek at the south end of the hamlet before merging with the group holding one at Morris about 1886.

Noblesville in 1878 had one church, store, hotel, mill and blacksmith.

New Lisbon Centre was listed as only having a church.

Stetsonville previously had a doctor, store, brickyard and wagon shop.

One of the notable industries was the Victor J. Warren hammer factory on the Butternut at Coles Rd., Garrattsville, of which it is said it once employed a hundred persons and every house in the hamlet was occupied by two families. Supplies were drawn in by oxcart from the Erie Canal to the north, and finished goods shipped out the same way. An employee named Anthony Slater was credited with a process for tempering cast steel, which was later sold by creditors along with all contents and machinery to the Maydole Hammer Co. of Norwich, New York. At least two Warren hammers exist, one of which is on display at the town hall.

- Martin and Robert L. George built stationary steam engines at Noblesville/New Lisbon hamlet in the 1890s, only one of which is known to survive.

Artemas Holdredge, cheese manufacturer in Garrattsville, invented the concept of putting cheese in rectangular instead of round "wheel" boxes for easier shipping and shelf storage.

Emmons L. Peck of Carbondale, PA, built a wooden tramway around Gilbert Lake 1906–1909, moving nine million feet of logs using a homebuilt geared steam locomotive later reputed to have been dragged out on the lake ice and sunk by employees when the land was purchased for the state present park about 1927. Lending evidence to the tale is the fact Peck abandoned a similar engine when through with operations on his next logging job on South Hill, Maryland, New York about 1912, later hauled out during war scrap metal drives.

The Persian Lamb Co. was an unsuccessful cooperative venture during World War I utilizing about a thousand acres of abandoned grazing land in the Welcome area to raise sheep imported for their skins, after the sheep died from pneumonia they switched to raising vegetables and beef but the stock shares ultimately became worthless.

== Geography ==
According to the United States Census Bureau, the town has a total area of 44.7 square miles (116 km^{2}), of which 44.5 square miles (115 km^{2}) is land and 0.1 square miles (0.26 km^{2}) (0.31%) is water.

New York State Route 51 is a north–south highway in New Lisbon.

The West Branch of Otego Creek flows along the eastern town line. Butternut Creek flows across the western part of New Lisbon.

== Demographics ==
Historical population
| Census | Pop. | Note | %± |
|---|---|---|---|
| 1820 | 2,221 | | — |
| 1830 | 2,232 | | 0.5% |
| 1840 | 1,909 | | −14.5% |
| 1850 | 1,773 | | −7.1% |
| 1860 | 1,733 | | −2.3% |
| 1870 | 1,545 | | −10.8% |
| 1880 | 1,569 | | 1.6% |
| 1890 | 1,323 | | −15.7% |
| 1900 | 1,225 | | −7.4% |
| 1910 | 1,039 | | −15.2% |
| 1920 | 912 | | −12.2% |
| 1930 | 781 | | −14.4% |
| 1940 | 801 | | 2.6% |
| 1950 | 877 | | 9.5% |
| 1960 | 812 | | −7.4% |
| 1970 | 823 | | 1.4% |
| 1980 | 948 | | 15.2% |
| 1990 | 996 | | 5.1% |
| 2000 | 1,116 | | 12.0% |
| 2010 | 1,114 | | −0.2% |
| 2016 (est.) | 1,060 | | −4.8% |
U.S. Decennial Census

As of the census of 2000, there were 1,116 people, 431 households, and 309 families residing in the town. The population density was 25.1 people per square mile (9.7 people/km^{2}). There were 586 housing units at an average density of 13.2 units per square mile (5.1 units/km^{2}). The racial makeup of the town was 97.31% White, 0.90% African American, 0.18% Native American, 0.45% Asian, 0.45% from other races, and 0.72% from two or more races. Hispanic or Latino people of any race were 1.34% of the population.

There were 431 households, out of which 32.9% had children under the age of 18 living with them, 58.7% were married couples living together, 8.8% had a female householder with no husband present, and 28.1% were non-families. 23.4% of all households were made up of individuals, and 9.7% had someone living alone who was 65 years of age or older. The average household size was 2.59 and the average family size was 3.04.

In the town, the population was spread out, with 25.4% under the age of 18, 6.4% from 18 to 24, 27.0% from 25 to 44, 27.2% from 45 to 64, and 14.0% who were 65 years of age or older. The median age was 40 years. For every 100 females, there were 96.5 males. For every 100 females age 18 and over, there were 97.6 males.

The median income for a household in the town was $33,750, and the median income for a family was $40,125. Males had a median income of $27,604 versus $22,500 for females. The per capita income for the town was $16,935. About 11.1% of families and 14.5% of the population were below the poverty line, including 19.2% of those under age 18 and 6.3% of those age 65 or over.

== Communities and locations in New Lisbon ==
- Crystal Lake (originally "Turtle Lake" until developed as a resort in the 1930s) – a small lake in the northwestern corner of New Lisbon
- Garrattsville – A hamlet named after early settler John Garratt, who was later taken captive during the American Revolution. The community is located on NY-51 at the junction of County Route 16, north of New Lisbon village in the northwestern part of the town. Until December 2010, when closed for unexplained reasons, it had its own post office. The Lunn-Musser Octagon Barn was listed on the National Register of Historic Places in 1988.
- Gilbert Lake – A small lake in Gilbert Lake State Park, originally a natural lake but enlarged several times as used to power various industries over the years. It opened as a state park in 1929, and became an important CCC encampment that included a steel firetower. It was originally known as Smith's Lake, for original owner and area land patent surveyor Richard Smith.
- Gilbert Lake State Park – a state park located at the southern town line
- Gill Hill – named for Englishman Mark Gill, whose abandoned homestead spurned ghost stories and legends of notoriety before burning and the land became a county reforestation area in the 1920s
- Gross Hill – an elevation in the northwestern corner of New Lisbon
- Lake of the Twin Fawns – a small lake in Gilbert Lake State Park, north of Gilbert Lake
- Lena – a location on County Route 14 near the eastern town line
- New Lisbon (formerly "Noblesville") – a hamlet in the southwestern corner of the town, located on NY-51 at the junction of County Route 12
- Stetsonville – A hamlet on NY-51 between New Lisbon village and Garrattsville. Named for founder John Stetson, carpenter and wagon builder.
- Stevens Corners – a location in the northwestern part of New Lisbon
- Welcome – a hamlet near the center of the town on County Routes 14 and 16
- Wooley Hill – An elevation located northeast of Garrattsville. Partly in the Town of Burlington.
