= New York State Route 205 =

State highway in Otsego County, New York, US

New York State Route 205
- NY 205 highlighted in red

Route information
- Maintained by NYSDOT
- Length: 23.24 mi (37.40 km)
- Existed: 1930–present

Major junctions
- South end: I-88 / NY 991D in Oneonta
- NY 7 in Oneonta; NY 23 in Oneonta
- North end: NY 28 / NY 80 in Otsego

Location
- Country: United States
- State: New York
- Counties: Otsego

Highway system
- New York Highways; Interstate; US; State; Reference; Parkways
← NY 204	→ NY 206

New York State Route 205 (NY 205) is a 23.24-mile-long (37.40 km) north–south state highway in central Otsego County, New York, in the United States. It extends from Interstate 88 (I-88) at exit 13 near the city of Oneonta to a junction with NY 28 and NY 80 in the town of Otsego. The latter junction also marks the east end of a 2.1-mile (3.4 km) overlap between NY 205 and NY 80, from where NY 80 heads southeast to follow NY 28 to Cooperstown. NY 205 is a two-lane highway for its entire length and passes through the towns of Oneonta, Laurens and Hartwick.

NY 205 originally began at NY 23 northwest of Oneonta when it was assigned as part of the 1930 renumbering of state highways in New York. The route originally followed local, substandard roads surrounding Otego Creek; however, it was gradually moved onto its modern alignment over the course of the 1930s. It was officially extended southward from West Oneonta to connect to I-88 in 1970; however, it was not extended southward in reality until the mid-1970s. The extension created a short overlap with NY 23 west of the city.

== Route description ==
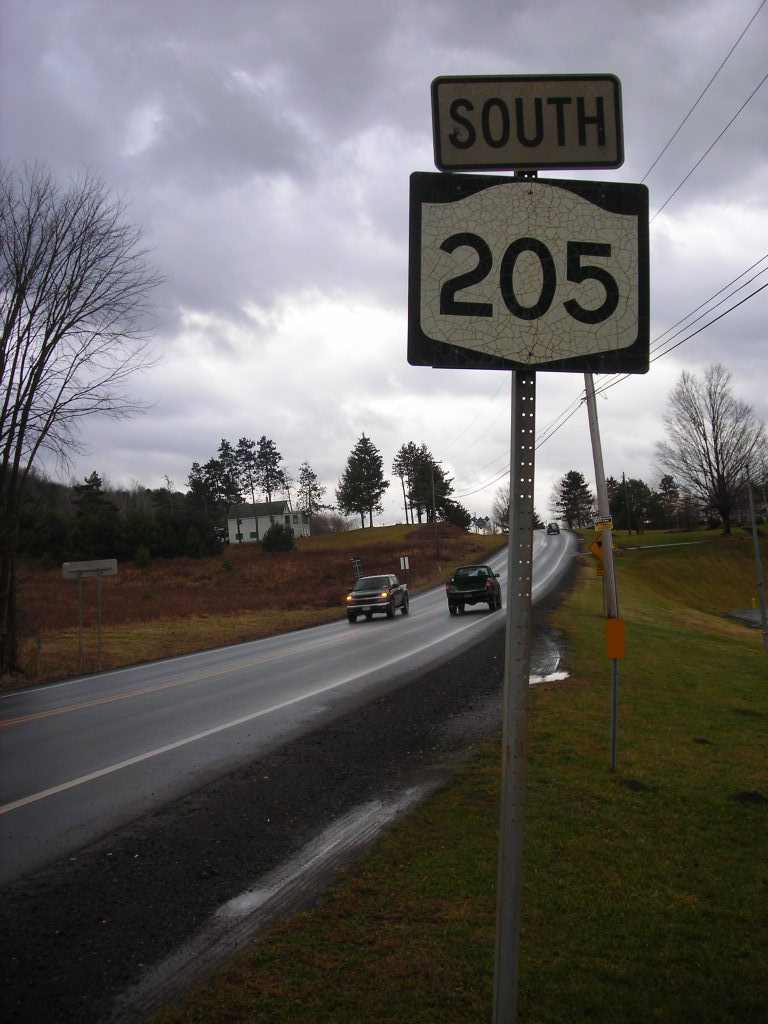
An old NY 205 reassurance marker just south of CR 11A in Laurens. It has since been replaced.

NY 205 begins at exit 13 off I-88 just north of the Susquehanna River in the town of Oneonta. Southeast of I-88, the roadway continues for .13 miles (0.21 km) as NY 991D, an unsigned reference route. The two-lane NY 205 heads northwestward from the exit, crossing the Interstate Highway and passing north of an office park built up alongside the freeway. Another overpass brings NY 205 over the Delaware and Hudson Railway and leads to an intersection with NY 7 (Oneida Street), the main east–west surface road through the city of Oneonta. Past NY 7, the route turns northward, serving the former National Soccer Hall of Fame and another office park prior to crossing County Route 8 (CR 8, named Country Club Road). NY 205 continues on, passing through a residential area adjacent to Oneonta County Club and intersecting with NY 23 (Chestnut Street) at the club's eastern edge. NY 23 turns north at the junction, overlapping with NY 205 for about 1 mile (1.6 km) to the outskirts of the town.

While NY 23 forks to the northwest to serve West Oneonta, NY 205 continues to run northward along the east side of Otego Creek through a rural section of Otsego County. It soon enters the town of Laurens, where it connects to CR 11A (Water Street) east of the village of Laurens. The short east–west county road is the only connection between NY 205 and the village, which is located on CR 11, a parallel route to NY 205 on the western bank of Otego Creek. NY 205 and CR 11 continue northeastward, following loosely parallel alignments to the hamlet of Mount Vision in the northern part of the town. In Mount Vision, NY 205 ducks northwest at an intersection with CR 46 and meets CR 11B (Mill Street), another connector between CR 11 and NY 205, near the Mount Vision Cemetery.

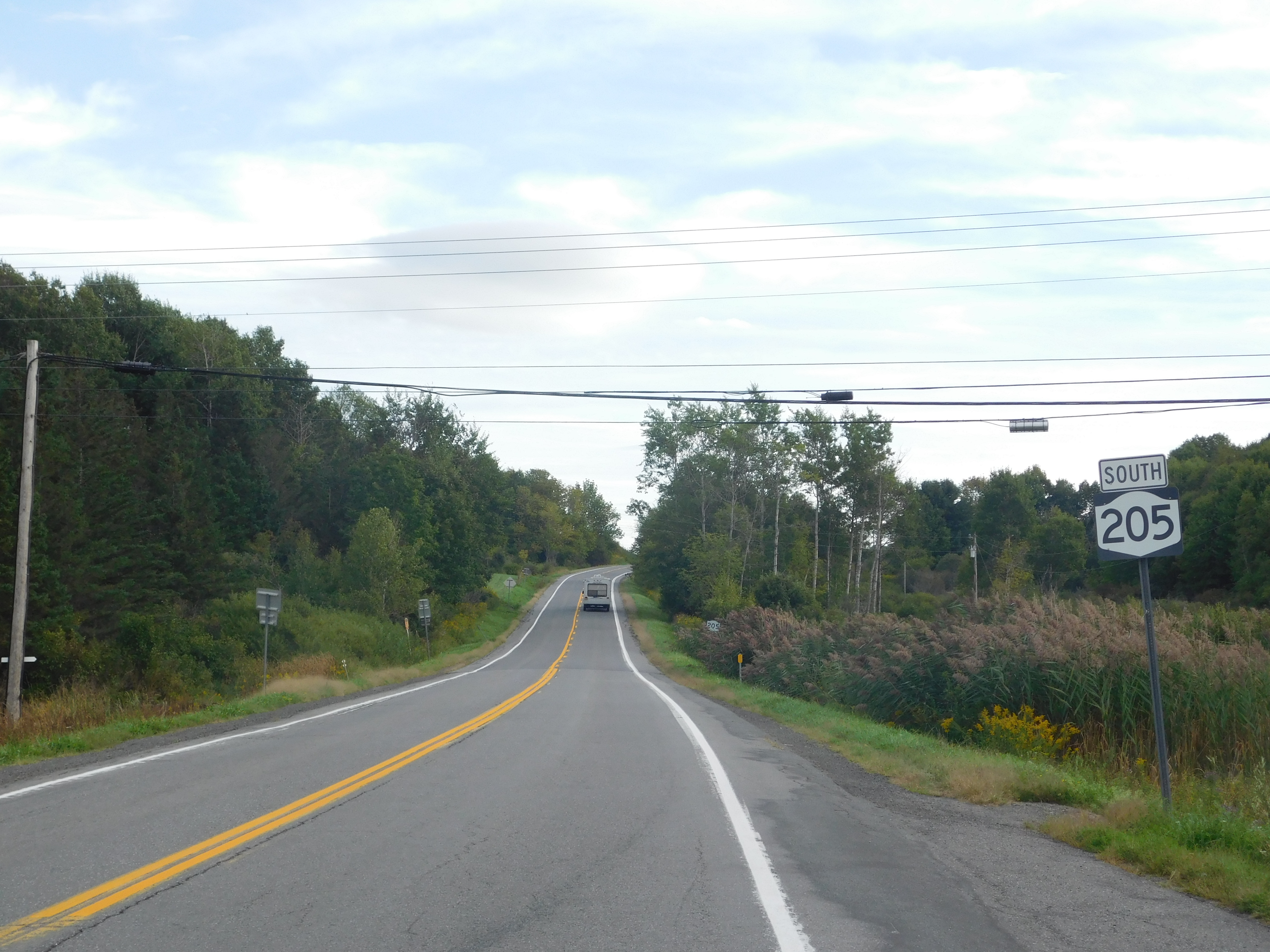
NY 205 southbound from NY 80

After leaving Mount Vision, the two roads parallel each other into the town of Hartwick, where both intersect with another highway crossing Otego Creek, CR 11D. The roads enter the hamlet of Jones Crossing, intersecting with another crossroad, the locally maintained Jones Crossing Road. In the rural backdrop north of Jones Crossing, NY 205 intersects with CR 45's western terminus. The parallel alignments of NY 205 and CR 11 end a short distance to the north in the hamlet of Hartwick as CR 11 enters the community on the east–west Main Street and intersects NY 205 in the hamlet's center. CR 11 leaves NY 205 for good outside of Hartwick, continuing on a generally easterly track toward NY 28 south of Cooperstown, while NY 205 passes Hartwick Town Park and crosses over Otego Creek as it heads northward into the town of Otsego.

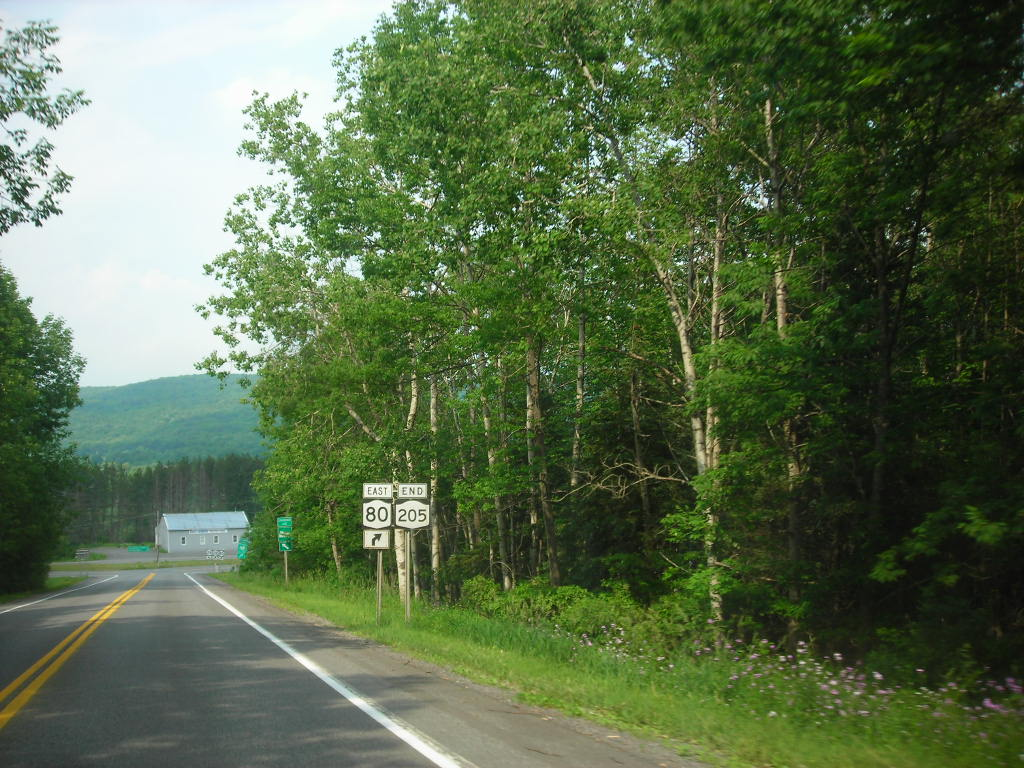
Northern terminus of NY 205 at NY 28 and NY 80

In Otsego, NY 205 continues to run through mostly undeveloped areas to a junction with NY 80. NY 205 turns eastward here to follow NY 80 while NY 205's former northward right-of-way continues as a town highway named Raymond Fish Road. The two state routes initially head southeastward for roughly 1 mile (1.6 km); however, they soon curve to the northeast as they descend into a valley surrounding Oaks Creek, a tributary of the Susquehanna River. At the base of the valley, NY 80 and NY 205 meet NY 28, the primary north–south road through the area. NY 205 terminates here while NY 80 heads southeastward along NY 28, following the route through the hamlet of Oaksville toward Cooperstown.

The section of NY 205 between I-88 and the northern terminus of the NY 23 overlap is the only section included in the National Highway System. The National Highway System is a system of highways important to the nation's defense, economy, and mobility. The functional classification of NY 205 is Principal Arterial from I-88 to the northern overlap of NY 23, and Minor Arterial for the rest of its length. Functional classification is the process by which roads, streets, and highways are grouped into classes according to the character of service they provide.

== History ==
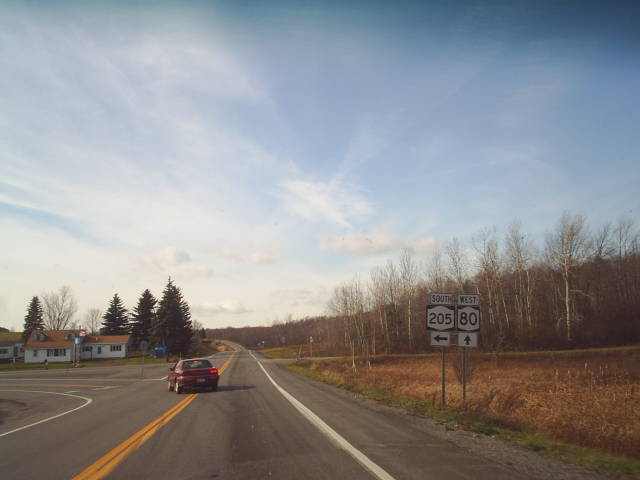
West end of NY 80 / NY 205 overlap

NY 205 was assigned as part of the 1930 renumbering of state highways in New York to a series of substandard highways connecting the hamlets of West Oneonta and Oaksville. The route began at NY 23 northwest of Oneonta and followed what is now CR 11 and CR 11B north through the village of Laurens and along the west side of Otego Creek to Mount Vision, from where it continued to NY 80 over a highway along the east bank of the creek that ultimately became the basis for NY 205's modern routing. At this point, NY 205 turned eastward, overlapping with NY 80 to connect to NY 28 at a junction just outside Oaksville and 5 miles (8.0 km) northwest of Cooperstown. South of Hartwick, NY 205 ran adjacent to the Southern New York Railway, a scenic passenger and freight railroad that was once the corridor's main transportation artery.

Work to replace or improve the existing roads began c. 1930 with the construction of a new highway between West Oneonta and modern CR 11A near Laurens that ran along the east side of Otego Creek. The new road was completed by 1932 as a realignment of NY 205, as was an extension of the highway north to Mount Vision. As part of the change, NY 205 was altered between Mount Vision and Hartwick to use a series of highways along the west bank of the creek, specifically Angel Road, current CR 11, and Weeks Road. In late 1932, the section of NY 205 north of Hartwick was closed to traffic as part of a project to completely reconstruct the road. The work was being done by Riteway Construction Company of Saint Johnsville and New York City. The project was completed and reopened c. 1934. The eastern creekside highway between Mount Vision and Hartwick was upgraded c. 1938; as a result, NY 205 was rerouted once again to follow the improved road.

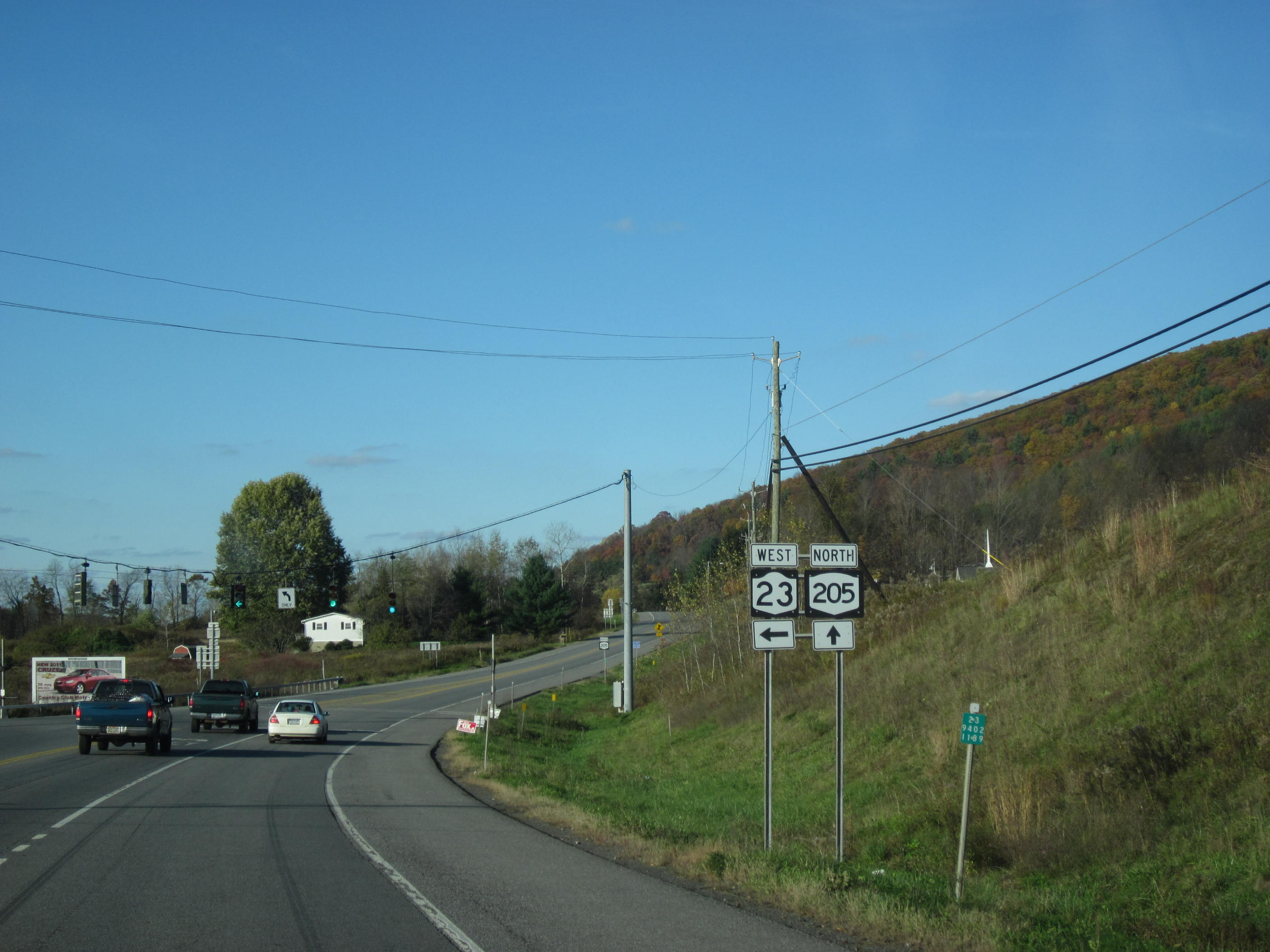
NY 205 northbound looking at former southern terminus before 1970

The reconstruction of NY 205 transformed the road into the main north–south connection between West Oneonta and Oaksville. At the same time, the parallel Southern New York Railroad had become unprofitable as the highways running alongside the track had become more appealing to shippers and travelers than the railroad itself. In 1940, the railroad abandoned the section of its line between West Oneonta and Jordanville, Herkimer County. The track ran alongside state routes for most of its length, and the presence of NY 205 and NY 167 was noted as a contributing factor to the line's demise in the railroad's abandonment petition to the Interstate Commerce Commission.

On January 1, 1970, NY 205 was officially extended southward to meet I-88 at what is now exit 13. In reality, however, NY 205 continued to begin at NY 23 for most of the early 1970s as all of I-88 had yet to be built. The extension finally materialized c. 1974 following the completion of I-88 in the vicinity of Oneonta. The newly extended NY 205 connected to the freeway by way of a 0.7-mile (1.1 km) overlap with NY 23 and a new 1.4-mile (2.3 km) highway linking NY 23 to an interchange with I-88 at the Oneonta city line.

=== Memorial designation ===
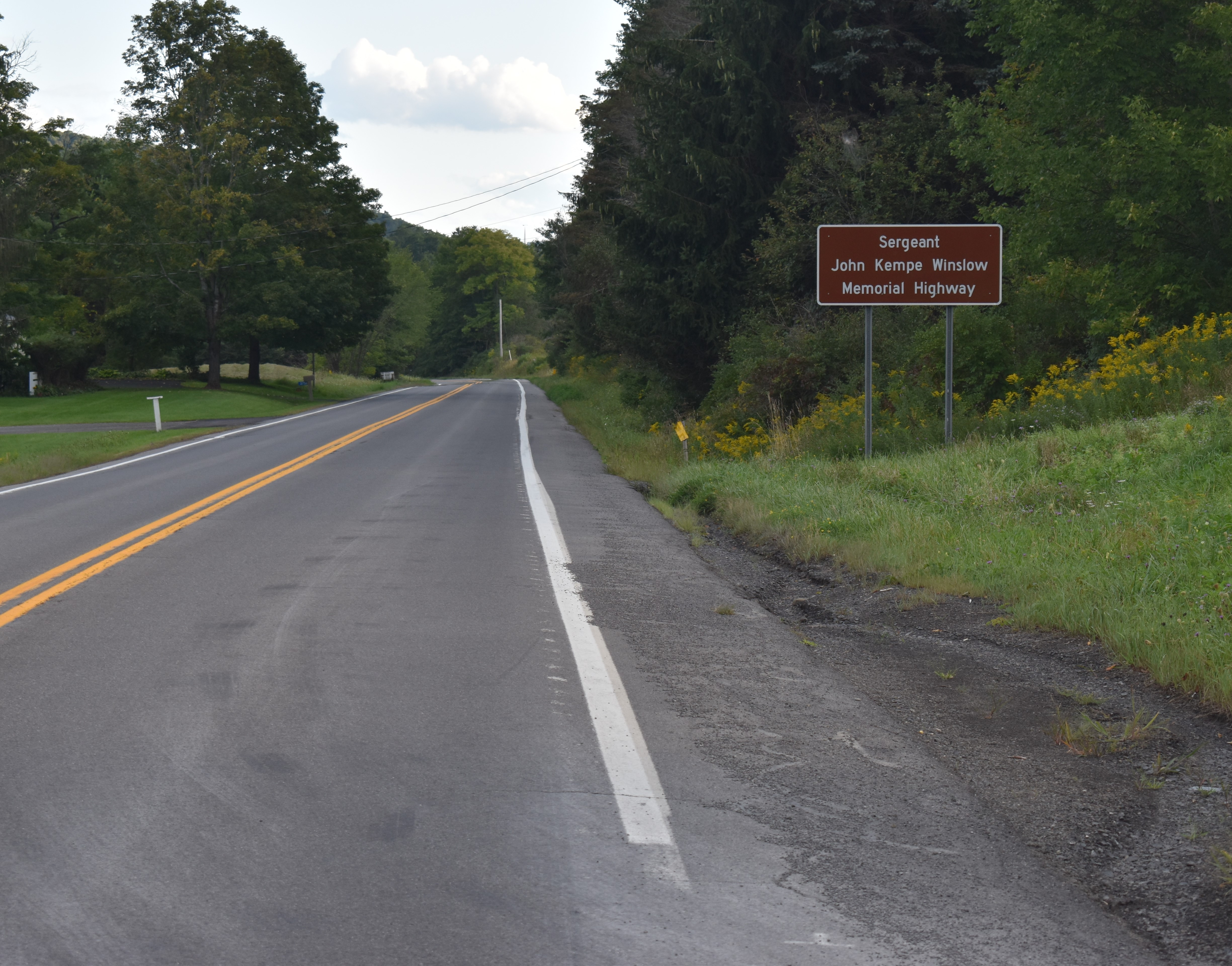
Sergeant John Kempe Winslow Memorial Highway

On August 9, 2019, Governor Andrew Cuomo signed into law that a portion of NY 205 was to be designated the "Sergeant John Kempe Winslow Memorial Highway" from Rod and Gun Club Road to Scotch Hill Road in the hamlet of Hartwick. Sergeant John Kempe Winslow was a life-long resident of Hartwick and a decorated Marine Sergeant who served two tours of duty in Vietnam and earned a purple heart during his first tour. Sergeant Winslow was killed in action on July 30, 1969. On October 5, 2020, the new signs were unveiled in a dedication ceremony with State Senator James L. Seward and assemblyman John Salka in attendance, as well as family members, veteran organizations, and community members.

== Major intersections ==
The entire route is in Otsego County.

Location	mi	km	Destinations	Notes
City of Oneonta	0.00	0.00	I-88 – Albany, Binghamton	Southern terminus; diamond interchange; exit 13 on I-88
Town of Oneonta	0.23	0.37	NY 7 (Oneida Street) – Oneonta, Otego	
Town of Oneonta	1.38	2.22	NY 23 east (Chestnut Street) – Oneonta	Southern terminus of NY 23 / NY 205 overlap; hamlet of West End
Town of Oneonta	2.08	3.35	NY 23 west – Morris	Northern terminus of NY 23 / NY 205 overlap
Otsego	21.32	34.31	NY 80 west	Western terminus of NY 80 / NY 205 overlap
Otsego	23.24	37.40	NY 28 / NY 80 east – Cooperstown, Richfield Springs	Northern terminus; eastern terminus of NY 80 / NY 205 overlap
1.000 mi = 1.609 km; 1.000 km = 0.621 mi: Concurrency terminus
