= List of county routes in Otsego County, New York =

County routes in Otsego County, New York, are signed with the Manual on Uniform Traffic Control Devices-standard yellow-on-blue pentagon route marker. Road names for each route are listed below where applicable; however, most routes are known only by their county route designation. Signage for county routes in Otsego County were posted in July 1965.

== List ==
Number	Length (mi)	Length (km)	Southern or western terminus	Northern or eastern terminus	Local names	Formed	Removed	Notes
CR 1	4.87	7.84	NY 7	Chenango County line (becomes CR 40)	Highland Avenue and Kip Hill, River, and Lockwood Hill roads in Unadilla	—	—	Includes spur to CR 35 at Chenango County line
CR 2	4.56	7.34	CR 1	CR 3	Rogers Hollow Road in Unadilla	—	—	
CR 3	8.73	14.05	Unadilla village line in Unadilla	NY 51 in Butternuts	Martinbrook Road	—	—	
CR 3A	4.18	6.73	NY 7	CR 3	Unnamed road in Unadilla	—	—	
CR 4	16.66	26.81	NY 7 in Unadilla	NY 23 in Morris	Unnamed road	—	—	
CR 5	6.76	10.88	NY 7 in Otego	Field Miller Road in Butternuts	Briar Creek Road	—	—	
CR 6	5.79	9.32	CR 7	CR 8	Unnamed road in Otego	—	—	
CR 7	5.96	9.59	NY 7 in Otego village	CR 8 in Otego	Otsdawa Road	—	—	Part south of CR 6 was designated NY 417 from c. 1932 to mid-1950s
CR 8	15.35	24.70	NY 51 in Gilbertsville	Ceperley Avenue in Oneonta	Country Club and Lower River roads	—	—	
CR 9	1.71	2.75	NY 7	CR 8	Unnamed road in Oneonta	—	—	
CR 10	9.79	15.76	CR 8 at the Butternuts town line in Morris	CR 11 in Laurens	Unnamed road	—	—	Discontinuous at NY 23
CR 11	19.80	31.87	NY 23 in Oneonta	NY 28 in Index	Unnamed road	—	—	
CR 11A	0.31	0.50	CR 11	NY 205	Water Street in Laurens	—	—	
CR 11B	0.48	0.77	CR 11	NY 205	Mill Street in Laurens	—	—	
CR 11C	0.69	1.11	NY 28 in Hartwick	CR 33 in Middlefield	Unnamed road	—	—	
CR 11D	0.27	0.43	CR 11	NY 205	Unnamed road in Hartwick	—	—	
CR 12	7.79	12.54	CR 11 in Laurens	NY 51 in New Lisbon	Unnamed road	—	—	
CR 12A	0.45	0.72	CR 10	CR 12	Unnamed road in Laurens	—	—	
CR 13	7.87	12.67	NY 51 in Morris	Chenango County line in Pittsfield	Unnamed road	—	—	
CR 14	8.21	13.21	CR 12 in New Lisbon	CR 11 in Hartwick	Unnamed road	—	—	
CR 15	2.41	3.88	CR 11	CR 14	Unnamed road in New Lisbon	—	—	
CR 16	16.57	26.67	CR 14 in New Lisbon	NY 28 in Exeter	Unnamed road	—	—	
CR 17	4.90	7.89	NY 80 in Pittsfield	CR 51 in New Lisbon	Unnamed road	—	—	
CR 18	34.51	55.54	NY 51 in Butternuts	Oneida County line in Plainfield (becomes CR 2)	Unnamed road	—	—	Part between CR 18B and US 20 was formerly NY 413
CR 18A	1.89	3.04	CR 18	Herkimer County line (becomes CR 162)	Forks Road in Plainfield	—	—	
CR 18B	0.12	0.19	Madison County line (becomes CR 84)	CR 18	Forks Road in Plainfield	—	—	
CR 18C	0.52	0.84	Madison County line (becomes CR 94)	CR 18	Welch Road in West Edmeston	—	—	
CR 19	10.04	16.16	Madison County line in Plainfield (becomes CR 96)	CR 22 in Exeter	Unnamed road	—	—	
CR 20	10.60	17.06	Chenango County line (becomes CR 25)	CR 18	West, North, Mill Creek, and Dye Hill roads in Edmeston	—	—	
CR 21	4.99	8.03	CR 18	NY 51	Unnamed road in Plainfield	—	—	
CR 22	12.29	19.78	NY 51 in Exeter	Richfield Springs village line in Richfield	Unnamed road	—	—	
CR 23	7.37	11.86	NY 51 in Plainfield	CR 22 in Exeter	Ryder Valley Road	—	—	
CR 24	6.21	9.99	CR 23 in Exeter	US 20 in Richfield	Unnamed road	—	—	
CR 25	7.28	11.72	Herkimer County line (becomes CR 153)	Richfield Springs village line	Old Skaneateles Turnpike in Richfield	—	—	
CR 25A	0.69	1.11	NY 28	US 20 / NY 28	Unnamed road in Richfield	—	—	
CR 26	13.76	22.14	NY 28 in Otsego	CR 27 in Springfield	Fly Creek Valley Road	—	—	
CR 27	5.26	8.47	US 20 in Richfield	NY 80 in Springfield	Allen Lake Road	—	—	
CR 28	4.03	6.49	NY 80	NY 80	Pierstown Road in Otsego	—	—	
CR 29	2.29	3.69	Herkimer County line (becomes CR 71)	Herkimer County line (becomes CR 138)	Chyle Road in Springfield	—	—	
CR 29A	1.21	1.95	NY 80	US 20	Unnamed road in Springfield	—	—	
CR 30	2.66	4.28	CR 31	Herkimer County line (becomes CR 95)	Unnamed road in Springfield	—	—	
CR 31	14.80	23.82	Cooperstown village line in Middlefield	Montgomery County line in Cherry Valley (becomes CR 80)	Unnamed road	—	—	
CR 32	2.62	4.22	US 20 / NY 166	Montgomery County line (becomes CR 82)	Unnamed road in Cherry Valley	—	—	
CR 32A	2.00	3.22	Montgomery County line (becomes CR 78)	Montgomery County line (becomes CR 83)	Unnamed road in Cherry Valley	—	—	
CR 32S	0.21	0.34	CR 32	Montgomery County line (becomes CR 81)	Unnamed road in Cherry Valley	—	—	
CR 33	18.88	30.38	NY 166 in Middlefield	NY 166 in Cherry Valley	Unnamed road	—	—	
CR 33S	0.29	0.47	CR 33	Dead end	Unnamed road in Middlefield	—	—	
CR 34	14.15	22.77	NY 7 in Maryland	NY 165 in Roseboom	Unnamed road	—	—	Part south of CR 36 was designated NY 314 from 1930 to mid-1950s
CR 34A	1.81	2.91	CR 54	Schoharie County line (becomes CR 55)	Unnamed road in Cherry Valley	—	—	
CR 35	17.57	28.28	NY 7 in Milford	NY 166 in Middlefield	Unnamed road	—	—	
CR 35A	0.28	0.45	NY 28	CR 35	Unnamed road in Milford	—	—	
CR 35B	0.22	0.35	NY 166 in Middlefield	CR 35 in Milford	Unnamed road	—	—	
CR 36	4.95	7.97	CR 39 in Worcester	CR 34 in Westford	Unnamed road	—	—	
CR 36A	3.60	5.79	CR 35 in Middlefield	CR 34 in Westford	Unnamed road	—	—	
CR 37	2.43	3.91	CR 39	CR 38	Unnamed road in Decatur	—	—	
CR 38	6.18	9.95	NY 7 in Worcester	CR 39 in Decatur	Unnamed road	—	—	
CR 38A	1.50	2.41	NY 7	Schoharie County line (becomes CR 22)	Brooker Hollow Road in Worcester	—	—	
CR 39	14.13	22.74	CR 40 in Worcester	CR 34 in Roseboom	Unnamed road	—	—	Discontinuous at NY 7
CR 40	4.06	6.53	Delaware County line in Maryland (becomes CR 9)	Schoharie County line in Worcester (becomes CR 6)	Unnamed road	—	—	
CR 41	2.74	4.41	Delaware County line	CR 56	Unnamed road in Maryland	—	—	
CR 42	6.72	10.81	NY 7 in Maryland	CR 35 in Westford	Unnamed road	—	—	
CR 43	0.72	1.16	CR 35	NY 166	Unnamed road in Middlefield	—	—	
CR 44	5.33	8.58	NY 28	Milford village line	Unnamed road in Milford	—	—	
CR 45	7.23	11.64	NY 28	NY 205	Unnamed road in Hartwick	—	—	
CR 46	5.79	9.32	NY 205 in Laurens	CR 44 in Milford	Unnamed road	—	—	
CR 47	1.91	3.07	NY 991F at I-88 exit 16 / NY 28	Delaware County line (becomes CR 11)	Unnamed road in Oneonta	—	—	
CR 48	8.66	13.94	Delaware County line in Otego	NY 28 in Oneonta	Unnamed road	—	—	
CR 48A	0.14	0.23	NY 991D at Susquehanna River bridge in Oneonta city	CR 48 in Oneonta	Unnamed road	—	—	
CR 49	10.18	16.38	NY 23 in Morris	NY 80 in Edmeston	Unnamed road	—	—	Discontinuous at NY 51
CR 50	10.03	16.14	NY 165 in Roseboom	Cherry Valley village line in Cherry Valley	Unnamed road	—	—	
CR 51	2.59	4.17	CR 10	NY 23	Unnamed road in Morris	—	—	
CR 52	3.36	5.41	Cooperstown village line	NY 166	Unnamed road in Middlefield	—	—	
CR 53	3.02	4.86	Herkimer County line (becomes CR 173)	Continental Road	Unnamed road in Springfield	—	—	
CR 54	6.85	11.02	US 20 in Springfield	US 20 in Cherry Valley	Unnamed road	—	—	Discontinuous at NY 166
CR 55	0.40	0.64	US 20	Herkimer County line (becomes CR 177)	Unnamed road in Richfield	—	—	
CR 56	2.13	3.43	Stevens Road	NY 992H at I-88 exit 18	Unnamed road in Maryland	—	—	
CR 56	0.79	1.27	Tannery Road	Schenevus village line	Lake Road in Maryland	—	—	
CR 57	0.93	1.50	NY 165	NY 165	Unnamed road in Roseboom	—	—	Former routing of NY 165
CR 58	2.90	4.67	CR 47 in Oneonta	NY 7 in Milford	Unnamed road	—	—	Discontinuous at I-88 / NY 28
CR 59	3.10	4.99	CR 11 in Hartwick	CR 26 in Otsego	Unnamed road	—	—	
CR 60	0.59	0.95	NY 205 / CR 61B	Oneonta city line	River Street Service Road in Oneonta	—	—	
CR 61A	0.27	0.43	0.09 miles (0.14 km) west of CR 61C	CR 61B	Pony Farm Road in Oneonta	—	—	
CR 61B	0.46	0.74	Dead end in Oneonta	NY 205 / CR 60 in Oneonta	Corporate Drive	—	—	
CR 61C	0.27	0.43	CR 61A in Oneonta	CR 61B in Oneonta city	Commerce Drive	—	—	

== See also ==
- County routes in New York
- List of former state routes in New York
