= Welcome, New York =

- Hamlet
- Location within the state of New York
- Coordinates: 42°37′25″N 75°08′41″W
- Country: United States
- State: New York
- County: Otsego
- Town: New Lisbon
- Elevation: 1,713 ft (522 m)
- Time zone: UTC-5 (Eastern (EST))
  - Summer (DST): UTC-4 (EDT)
- ZIP code: 13810
- Area code: 607

Welcome is a hamlet in Otsego County, New York, United States. It is located southeast of Garrattsville on Otsego County Route 16.
