= Oneonta (town), New York =

Town in New York, United States

Oneonta, New York
- Town
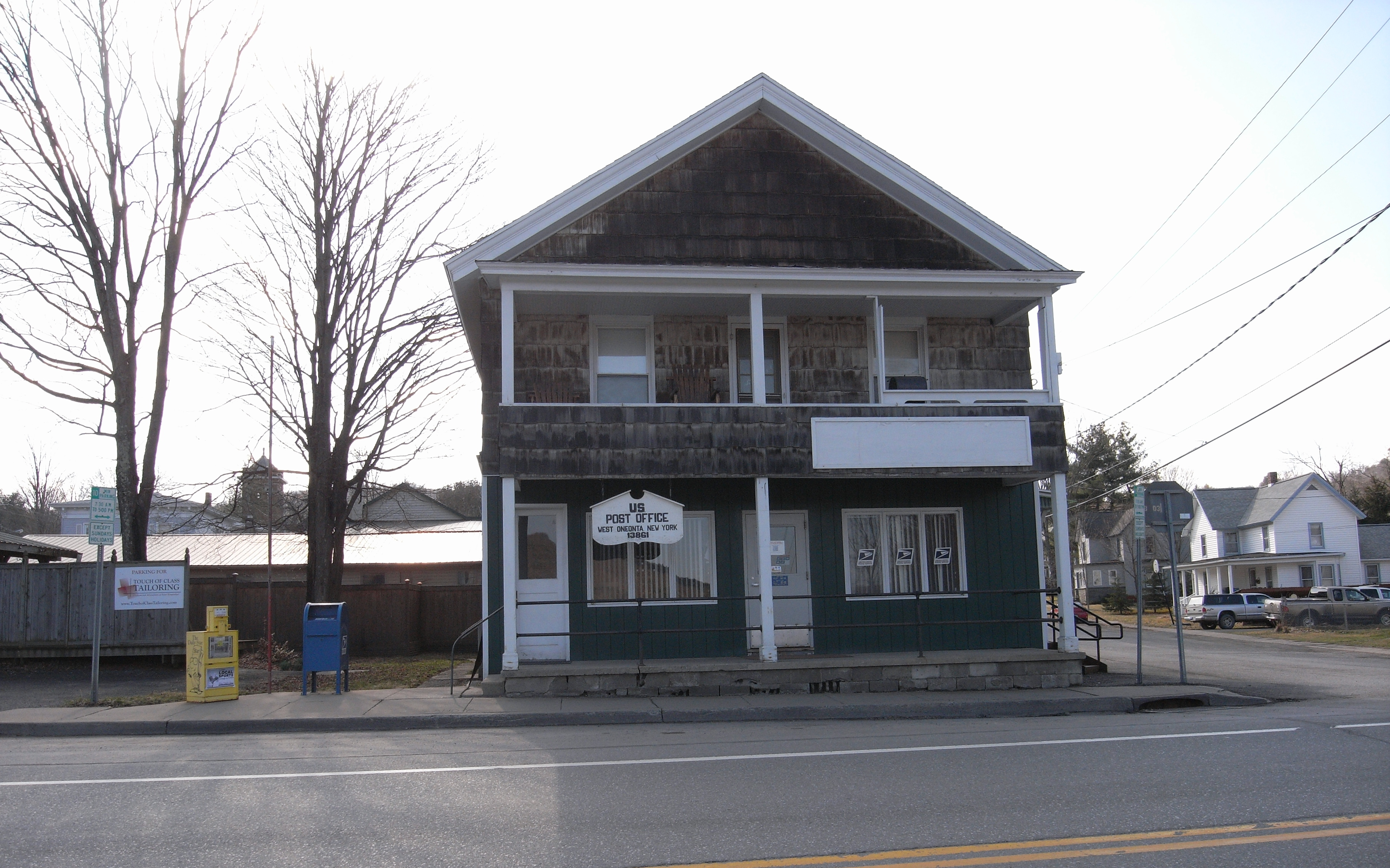
- Post office in West Oneonta

- Seal

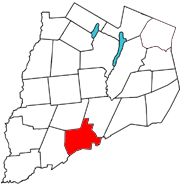
- Otsego County map with the Town of Oneonta in red
- Coordinates: 42°28′20″N 75°4′28″W
- Country: United States
- State: New York
- County: Otsego

Area
  - Total: 33.16 sq mi (85.89 km^{2})
  - Land: 32.91 sq mi (85.24 km^{2})
  - Water: 0.25 sq mi (0.65 km^{2})
- Elevation: 1,368 ft (417 m)

Population (2020)
  - Total: 5,065
- Time zone: UTC-5 (Eastern (EST))
  - Summer (DST): UTC-4 (EDT)
- ZIP code: 13820
- Area code: 607
- FIPS code: 36-54892
- GNIS feature ID: 0979310
- Website: www.townofoneonta.org

Oneonta is a town in Otsego County, New York, United States. The population was 5,065 at the 2020 census.

The Town of Oneonta surrounds the City of Oneonta, which has a population of 13,791. The meaning of the native word "oneonta" is "city of the hills".

== History ==
The town was first settled before the American Revolution by Palatine Germans and Dutch settlers from the Hudson Valley. In 1779, the army of General Clinton passed through the area to join the Sullivan Expedition.

The Town of Oneonta was established in 1830 from parts of the Towns of Otego and Milford.

The community of Oneonta, developed from earlier "McDonaldville" and "Milfordville," became a railroad center for such lines as the Delaware and Hudson. In 1906, the Delaware and Hudson Railroad constructed a roadhouse in Oneonta with 52 stalls for servicing and storing locomotives. The world's largest locomotive roundhouse stood in Oneonta until a larger one was constructed in Germany. This community set itself off from the town by incorporating as a village in 1848.

The normal school, established in 1889, is now the State University of New York at Oneonta.

The Village of Oneonta became a city in 1908. This small city was an important manufacturing center in the early 20th century.

The Linn Trailer Corp. was built in West End in 1929. It was founded by H.H. Linn of nearby Morris. He was replaced in 1937 by Arthur Perkins of the Unadilla Trailer Co. of New Berlin, NY, who obtained several patents of his own relating to trailers. He built front-wheel drive vans until Great American Industries took over in 1948. Union problems closed their doors in 1952, delaying vital military contracts that Lyncoach Corp. was formed to complete, who later moved into the original Linn building until the 1970s when they relocated to a branch factory in Troy, Alabama.

== Geography ==
According to the United States Census Bureau, the town has a total area of 33.6 square miles (87.1 km^{2}), of which 33.5 square miles (86.8 km^{2}) is land and 0.1 square mile (0.4 km^{2}) (0.42%) is water.

Otego Creek and Oneonta Creek flow into the Susquehanna River in the town.

The town is bordered by the Town of Otego to the west, the Town of Laurens to the northwest, the Town of Milford to the northeast and Delaware County to the south.

Interstate 88 follows the course of the Susquehanna River through the town. New York State Route 7 and New York State Route 23, New York State Route 28 and New York State Route 205 all pass through the town.

=== Climate ===
There is a weather station for Emmons, a community on the edge of Oneonta. Emmons has a humid continental climate (Köppen Dfb), with warm, wet summers and cold, snowy winters.

Climate data for Emmons, 1991–2020 normals, 1983-2020 extremes: 1225ft (373m)
Month	Jan	Feb	Mar	Apr	May	Jun	Jul	Aug	Sep	Oct	Nov	Dec	Year
Record high °F (°C)	64 (18)	75 (24)	83 (28)	92 (33)	90 (32)	93 (34)	98 (37)	97 (36)	90 (32)	83 (28)	75 (24)	66 (19)	98 (37)
Mean maximum °F (°C)	55.1 (12.8)	53.5 (11.9)	63.8 (17.7)	78.6 (25.9)	85.0 (29.4)	87.8 (31.0)	88.6 (31.4)	87.4 (30.8)	85.1 (29.5)	76.6 (24.8)	67.2 (19.6)	56.1 (13.4)	90.8 (32.7)
Mean daily maximum °F (°C)	30.2 (−1.0)	32.4 (0.2)	40.6 (4.8)	54.6 (12.6)	66.8 (19.3)	74.2 (23.4)	78.4 (25.8)	77.1 (25.1)	70.4 (21.3)	58.2 (14.6)	45.8 (7.7)	35.0 (1.7)	55.3 (13.0)
Daily mean °F (°C)	20.8 (−6.2)	22.4 (−5.3)	29.9 (−1.2)	42.5 (5.8)	54.1 (12.3)	62.4 (16.9)	66.8 (19.3)	65.6 (18.7)	58.7 (14.8)	47.5 (8.6)	36.8 (2.7)	27.1 (−2.7)	44.6 (7.0)
Mean daily minimum °F (°C)	11.4 (−11.4)	12.3 (−10.9)	19.1 (−7.2)	30.4 (−0.9)	41.3 (5.2)	50.6 (10.3)	55.2 (12.9)	54.0 (12.2)	47.0 (8.3)	36.8 (2.7)	27.8 (−2.3)	19.2 (−7.1)	33.8 (1.0)
Mean minimum °F (°C)	−10.8 (−23.8)	−7.2 (−21.8)	−0.3 (−17.9)	18.4 (−7.6)	28.3 (−2.1)	38.0 (3.3)	45.5 (7.5)	43.7 (6.5)	33.9 (1.1)	24.9 (−3.9)	12.5 (−10.8)	−0.2 (−17.9)	−13.7 (−25.4)
Record low °F (°C)	−26 (−32)	−23 (−31)	−17 (−27)	7 (−14)	23 (−5)	31 (−1)	38 (3)	35 (2)	27 (−3)	18 (−8)	−10 (−23)	−22 (−30)	−26 (−32)
Average precipitation inches (mm)	3.30 (84)	2.75 (70)	3.50 (89)	3.85 (98)	3.66 (93)	4.66 (118)	4.48 (114)	3.99 (101)	3.78 (96)	3.89 (99)	3.28 (83)	3.61 (92)	44.75 (1,137)
Average snowfall inches (cm)	20.70 (52.6)	19.50 (49.5)	14.50 (36.8)	3.30 (8.4)	0.30 (0.76)	0.00 (0.00)	0.00 (0.00)	0.00 (0.00)	0.00 (0.00)	0.80 (2.0)	6.30 (16.0)	17.60 (44.7)	83 (210.76)
Source 1: NOAA
Source 2: XMACIS (temp records & monthly max/mins)

== Demographics ==
Historical population
Census	Pop.	Note	%±
1830	1,828		—
1840	1,936		5.9%
1850	1,902		−1.8%
1860	2,158		13.5%
1870	2,568		19.0%
1880	4,461		73.7%
1890	1,746		−60.9%
1900	1,763		1.0%
1910	1,307		−25.9%
1920	1,601		22.5%
1930	2,314		44.5%
1940	2,673		15.5%
1950	3,508		31.2%
1960	4,068		16.0%
1970	4,185		2.9%
1980	4,655		11.2%
1990	4,963		6.6%
2000	4,994		0.6%
2010	5,229		4.7%
2020	5,065		−3.1%
U.S. Decennial Census 2020

As of the census of 2000, there were 4,994 people, 1,958 households, and 1,298 families residing in the town. The population density was 149.1 inhabitants per square mile (57.6/km^{2}). There were 2,117 housing units at an average density of 63.2 per square mile (24.4/km^{2}). The racial makeup of the town was 90.67% White, 6.15% Black or African American, 0.34% Native American, 0.80% Asian, 0.04% Pacific Islander, 0.92% from other races, and 1.08% from two or more races. Hispanic or Latino people of any race were 3.38% of the population.

There were 1,958 households, out of which 28.4% had children under the age of 18 living with them, 52.5% were married couples living together, 9.5% had a female householder with no husband present, and 33.7% were non-families. 27.1% of all households were made up of individuals, and 11.4% had someone living alone who was 65 years of age or older. The average household size was 2.32 and the average family size was 2.80.

In the town, the population was spread out, with 23.8% under the age of 18, 9.1% from 18 to 24, 23.6% from 25 to 44, 26.9% from 45 to 64, and 16.5% who were 65 years of age or older. The median age was 41 years. For every 100 females, there were 96.8 males. For every 100 females age 18 and over, there were 91.4 males.

The median income for a household in the town was $35,634, and the median income for a family was $43,125. Males had a median income of $34,679 versus $23,246 for females. The per capita income for the town was $18,841. About 6.2% of families and 15.2% of the population were below the poverty line, including 10.8% of those under age 18 and 4.8% of those age 65 or over.

== Communities and locations in the Town of Oneonta ==
- Baker Hill – An elevation west of West Oneonta
- Emmons – Community at the eastern edge of the town
- Franklin Mountain – An elevation on the southern town line. Partially in Delaware County
- Gifford Hill – An elevation northeast of the City of Oneonta
- Oneonta – The City of Oneonta
- Oneonta Plains – A lowland north of the Susquehanna River
- Southside – The area south of The Susquehanna River which has a major retail shopping district, hotels, and some private residences
- West End – The area just west of the City of Oneonta
- West Oneonta – A hamlet northwest of the City of Oneonta
- Wilber Lake – A lake located north of the city of Oneonta
- Winnie Hill – An elevation north of the city of Oneonta

== Parks and recreation ==
- Fortin Park – At the former site of F&F Airpark at the eastern edge of the town, Fortin Park features large, flat, open, grassy spaces, with pavilions, barbecues, walking trails, playgrounds, ballfields, and former aircraft hangars used for skating in the winter and available for other activities in the warmer months.
- Oneonta Greenway Trail – A series of trails located behind the city municipal complex. There are plans to extend this network of trails to Fortin Park, more than 6 miles away.
- Otego Creek Access Site (former Hemstreet Park) – The town assumed ownership of the former Hemstreet Park located on the Otego Creek in 2004. This small park nestled on the bank of the Otego Creek offers picnicking and fishing from the bank and a place to launch a boat on the creek, which flows into the Susquehanna.

== Retail ==
Southside Mall was built in 1983.

== Notable people ==
- George Winthrop Fairchild, Republican congressman, businessman, chairman of the Computing-Tabulating-Recording Company, a forerunner of IBM
- Sherman Fairchild, businessman and investor, founder of Fairchild Aircraft and other companies; major stockholder in IBM
- Al Gallodoro, jazz clarinetist and saxophonist, lived, performed and taught in Oneonta from 1981 until his death in 2008
- Henry E. Huntington, railroad magnate, born in Oneonta (1850)
- Paul Reubens (aka Pee-wee Herman), resided on Richmond Avenue as a child
- Jerry Jeff Walker, musician, grew up on East End Avenue
