= Gilbert Lake =

Gilbert Lake may refer to:

- Gilbert Lake (New York), a lake in Otsego County, New York
- Gilbert Lake (sound engineer), American sound engineer
- Tasikallak, formerly Gilbert Lake in Nunavut, Canada

== See also ==
- Gilbert Lake State Park, Otsego County, New York
