= East Branch Otsdawa Creek =

- Location of the mouth of East Branch Otsdawa Creek

Location
- Country: United States
- State: New York
- County: Otsego

Physical characteristics
- Source
  - coordinates: 42°30′06″N 75°12′23″W
- Mouth: Otsdawa Creek
  - coordinates: 42°24′59″N 75°10′52″W
  - elevation: 1,129 ft (344 m)

East Branch Otsdawa Creek is a river in Otsego County, New York. It converges with Otsdawa Creek north-northwest of Otego.
