= Flax Island Creek =

- Location of the mouth in New York

Location
- Country: United States
- State: New York
- Region: Central New York Region

Physical characteristics
- Source
  - coordinates: 42°27′59″N 75°13′57″W
- Mouth: Susquehanna River
  - location: Otego, New York
  - coordinates: 42°23′14″N 75°10′50″W
  - elevation: 1,020 ft (310 m)

Flax Island Creek is a river located in southern Otsego County, New York. The creek converges with the Susquehanna River by Otego, New York.

== History ==
Flax Island Creek is named after a small island, called Flax Island, that used to be on the Susquehanna River below the mouth where the wild flax grew in abundance. In the resurvey of the Wallace patent in 1773 the island is shown as Flax Island.
