= Gifford Hill =

Gifford Hill may refer to:

- Gifford Hill (Oneida County, New York), an elevation in Oneida County, New York
- Gifford Hill (Onondaga County, New York), an elevation in Onondaga County, New York
- Gifford Hill (Otsego County, New York), an elevation in Otsego County, New York
- Gifford Hill, South Australia, a suburb of Murray Bridge in South Australia, Australia
