= Crystal Lake (Otsego County, New York) =

Lake in New York, United States

- Location of Crystal Lake within New York State
- Location: Otsego County, New York
- Coordinates: 42°39′01″N 75°12′06″W
- Surface area: 33 acres (13 ha)
- Surface elevation: 1,552 feet (473 m)
- Settlements: Garrattsville

Crystal Lake is a small lake in Otsego County, New York. It is located west of Garrattsville. Crystal Lake drains south via an unnamed creek which flows into the Butternut Creek. Gross Hill is located north of Crystal Lake.
