= Flax Island =

- Interactive map of Flax Island

Geography
- Location: Susquehanna River
- Coordinates: 42.387°N 75.180°W

Administration
- United States
- State: New York
- County: Otsego
- Village: Otego

Flax Island was an island located by Otego, New York, on the Susquehanna River below the mouth of Flax Island Creek. In a deed from 1807 it is called Flax Island, and also Vrooman's Island. It has since washed away.

It was where Indians grew wild flax or hemp. The hemp was a necessity to the Indians, who called the surrounding area Otsdawa which translates to "the place of the big hemp".
