= Otsdawa Creek =

- Location of the mouth of Otsdawa Creek

Location
- Country: United States
- State: New York
- County: Otsego

Physical characteristics
- Source: West Branch Otsdawa Creek
  - coordinates: 42°29′22″N 75°13′41″W
- 2nd source: East Branch Otsdawa Creek
  - coordinates: 42°30′06″N 75°12′23″W
- Source confluence
  - location: NNW of Otego
  - coordinates: 42°24′59″N 75°10′52″W
  - elevation: 1,129 ft (344 m)
- Mouth: Susquehanna River
  - coordinates: 42°23′54″N 75°09′54″W
  - elevation: 1,020 ft (310 m)

Otsdawa Creek is a river in Otsego County, New York. It converges with the Susquehanna River northeast of Otego.
