= Bassett Family House =

Historic house in New York, United States

- U.S. National Register of Historic Places
- Location within New York Location within the United States
- Location: 2399 Main St., Mt. Vision, New York
- Coordinates: 42°34′49″N 75°3′31″W
- Area: 1.5 acres (0.61 ha)
- Built: 1844
- Architectural style: Greek Revival
- NRHP reference No.: 04000823
- Added to NRHP: August 11, 2004

The Bassett Family House (also known as the Dielytra Arbor House) is a historic house located at 2399 Main Street in Mt. Vision, Otsego County, New York.

== Description and history ==
It was built in 1844, and is a two-story residence with a heavy timber, post and beam frame and wooden clapboard siding, set on a cut-stone foundation and surmounted by a gabled roof. A series of additions and modifications took place in the 1860s and 1870s. The interior features a number of Greek Revival details. Also on the property is a barn and two chicken houses.

It was listed on the National Register of Historic Places on August 11, 2004.
