= Laurens, New York =

- Town
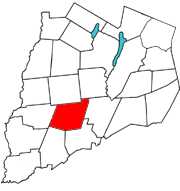
- Otsego County map with the Town of Laurens in red
- Coordinates: 42.5306°N 75.0896°W
- Country: United States
- State: New York
- County: Otsego

Area
  - Total: 42.17 sq mi (109.21 km^{2})
  - Land: 42.05 sq mi (108.91 km^{2})
  - Water: 0.12 sq mi (0.31 km^{2})
- Elevation: 1,112 ft (339 m)

Population (2010)
  - Total: 2,424
  - Estimate (2016): 2,311
  - Density: 55.0/sq mi (21.22/km^{2})
- Time zone: UTC-5 (Eastern (EST))
  - Summer (DST): UTC-4 (EDT)
- ZIP code: 13796
- Area code: 607
- FIPS code: 36-077-41531

Laurens is a town in Otsego County, New York, United States. The population was 2,424 at the 2010 census.

The Town of Laurens is in the southern half of the county, north of the City of Oneonta. There is also a village named Laurens, located in the town.

== History ==
The town was first settled by Europeans around 1773. Joseph Mayall arrived in 1773 about one mile north of the present Laurens village. The raiding party responsible for the Cherry Valley Massacre also pillaged part of Laurens and burned some property.

The town was formed from the Town of Otsego in 1810. It was named for Revolutionary War hero Henry Laurens.

A resort developed by the Oneonta Mohawk trolley line called Otsego Park was formerly located in the eastern part of Laurens. Cotton mills once were an industry in Laurens, powered by the water of Gilbert Lake.

== Geography ==
According to the United States Census Bureau, the town has a total area of 42.7 square miles (110.5 km^{2}), of which 42.6 square miles (110.3 km^{2}) is land and 0.1 square mile (0.3 km^{2}) (0.23%) is water.

Otego Creek flows southward through the eastern part of Laurens.

A sulfur spring is located about one mile north of Laurens village.

New York State Route 205, a north-south highway, follows the course of Otsego Creek. New York State Route 23, an east-west highway, passes through the center of the town.

== Demographics ==
Historical population
Census	Pop.	Note	%±
1820	2,074		—
1830	2,231		7.6%
1840	2,173		−2.6%
1850	2,168		−0.2%
1860	1,936		−10.7%
1870	1,919		−0.9%
1880	1,827		−4.8%
1890	1,659		−9.2%
1900	1,483		−10.6%
1910	1,453		−2.0%
1920	1,335		−8.1%
1930	1,423		6.6%
1940	1,395		−2.0%
1950	1,447		3.7%
1960	1,498		3.5%
1970	1,730		15.5%
1980	2,101		21.4%
1990	2,349		11.8%
2000	2,402		2.3%
2010	2,424		0.9%
2016 (est.)	2,311	▼	−4.7%
U.S. Decennial Census

As of the census of 2000, there were 2,402 people, 965 households, and 692 families residing in the town. The population density was 56.4 inhabitants per square mile (21.8/km^{2}). There were 1,145 housing units at an average density of 26.9 per square mile (10.4/km^{2}). The racial makeup of the town was 97.04% White, 0.25% Black or African American, 0.46% Native American, 0.12% Asian, 0.08% Pacific Islander, 0.75% from other races, and 1.29% from two or more races. Hispanic or Latino people of any race were 1.46% of the population.

There were 965 households, out of which 32.1% had children under the age of 18 living with them, 55.5% were married couples living together, 11.5% had a female householder with no husband present, and 28.2% were non-families. 21.9% of all households were made up of individuals, and 7.6% had someone living alone who was 65 years of age or older. The average household size was 2.49 and the average family size was 2.88.

In the town, the population was spread out, with 25.8% under the age of 18, 6.3% from 18 to 24, 27.5% from 25 to 44, 27.2% from 45 to 64, and 13.2% who were 65 years of age or older. The median age was 40 years. For every 100 females, there were 95.4 males. For every 100 females age 18 and over, there were 93.9 males.

The median income for a household in the town was $36,324, and the median income for a family was $40,833. Males had a median income of $30,144 versus $23,235 for females. The per capita income for the town was $16,985. About 9.8% of families and 11.9% of the population were below the poverty line, including 16.7% of those under age 18 and 6.3% of those age 65 or over.

== Communities and locations in Laurens ==
- Butts Corners – a location north of West Laurens on County Road 10
- East Hill – an elevation located east of Laurens
- Gilbert Lake State Park – a state park partly inside the northern town line
- Laurens – the village of Laurens by the junction of County Roads 10, 11 and 12, near Otsego Creek
- Mount Vision – A hamlet in the northeastern part of town on NY-205. Formerly known as "Jacksonville."
- Naylor Corners – A location at the northern town line. The Bassett Family House and Kenyon Residences are listed on the National Register of Historic Places.
- Oneonta Municipal Airport (N66) – The airport is approximately three miles north of the city of Oneonta and lies in the southeastern section of the town of Laurens.
- West Laurens – a hamlet at the intersection of NY-23 and County Road 10 near the western town line, once known locally as "Sheepskin"

== Notable people ==
- Emelyn Elizabeth Gardner, folklorist and English professor
- Mel Gibson, actor; lived in the hamlet of Mount Vision and attended Laurens Central School before moving to Australia when he was a child
- Perry G. Harrington, Wisconsin state assemblyman; born in the town
