= Interstate 88 (New York) =

Interstate Highway in New York

Interstate 88
- Senator Warren M. Anderson Expressway; Susquehanna Expressway
- Map of eastern New York with I-88 highlighted in red

Route information
- Maintained by NYSDOT
- Length: 117.75 mi (189.50 km)
- Existed: December 13, 1968–present
- History: Completed in 1989
- NHS: Entire route

Major junctions
- West end: I-81 in Chenango
- NY 79 in Harpursville; NY 41 in Afton; NY 206 in Bainbridge; NY 8 in Sidney; NY 357 in Unadilla; NY 23 / NY 28 in Oneonta; NY 10 in Richmondville; NY 30 near Central Bridge
- East end: I-90 Toll / New York Thruway in Rotterdam

Location
- Country: United States
- State: New York
- Counties: Broome, Chenango, Delaware, Otsego, Schoharie, Schenectady

Highway system
- Interstate Highway System; Main; Auxiliary; Suffixed; Business; Future; New York Highways; Interstate; US; State; Reference; Parkways
← NY 87	→ NY 88

Interstate 88 (I-88) is an Interstate Highway located entirely within the US state of New York. Nominally signed as an east–west road as it has an even number, it extends for 117.75 miles (189.50 km) in a northeast–southwest direction from an interchange with I-81 north of the city of Binghamton to an interchange with the New York State Thruway (I-90) west of Schenectady. The freeway serves as an important connector route from the Capital District to Binghamton, Elmira (via New York State Route 17 or NY 17, I-86), and Scranton, Pennsylvania (via I-81). I-88 closely parallels NY 7, which was once the main route through the area.

I-88 was assigned in 1968, and construction of the highway began soon afterward. The first section of I-88 opened in the early 1970s, connecting two communities northeast of Binghamton. The last piece of the freeway was finished in 1989, linking the original segment to I-81 north of Binghamton. Early plans for I-88 called for the road to continue northeast to Troy; however, the east end of the route was moved to Schenectady in the early 1980s. A combined freeway/tollway in Illinois, though not contiguous, was also assigned the I-88 designation in 1987.

== Route description ==
=== Binghamton to Oneonta ===
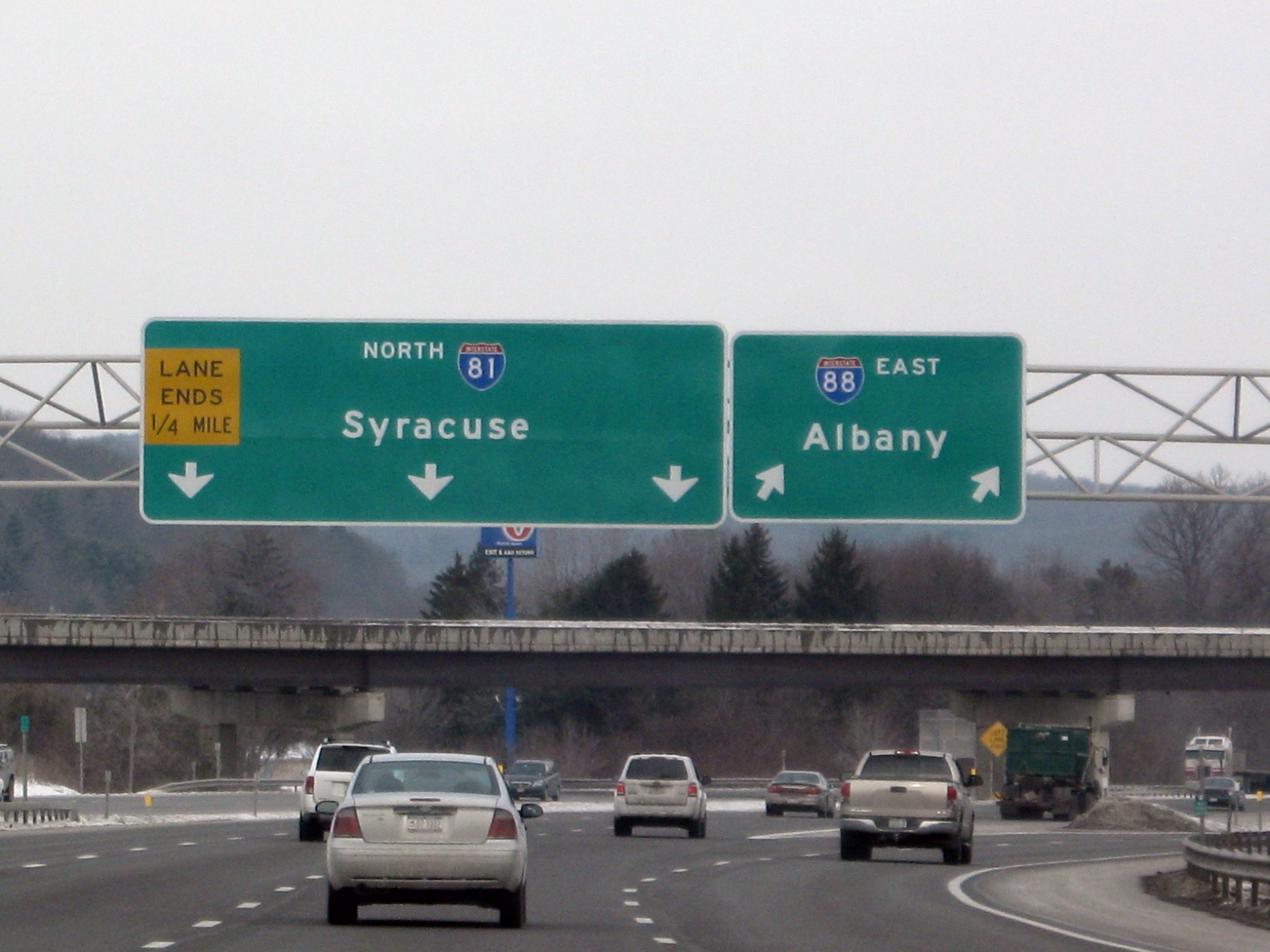
I-88 begins here at I-81 near Binghamton, and heads northeast toward New York's Capital District.

I-88 begins at an interchange with I-81 just north of Downtown Binghamton on the banks of the Chenango River. While both directions of I-81 are accessible from I-88 westbound, only one direction of I-81 (northbound) connects to I-88. The missing connection, I-81 south to I-88 east, is made via US Route 11 (US 11), NY 12, and NY 12A at I-81 exit 16 (old exit 6). NY 12A then connects to I-88 at exit 2.

From I-81, I-88 heads east across the Chenango to Port Dickinson, where it merges with NY 7 (here also a limited-access highway) at exit 1. The two routes continue north, then east along the eastern bank of the Chenango River, where it meets NY 12A near Chenango Bridge. I-88 and NY 7 remain alongside the river to Port Crane, where the river begins to follow NY 369 (exit 4) northward. Outside of Port Crane, the expressway heads east to Sanitaria Springs. Here, NY 7 leaves the expressway at exit 8 and begins to parallel I-88, as it does for the remainder of I-88's routing. I-88 begins to climb a hill, with the eastbound lane having three lanes then soon meets Martin Hill Road (NY 992P) at exit 12.

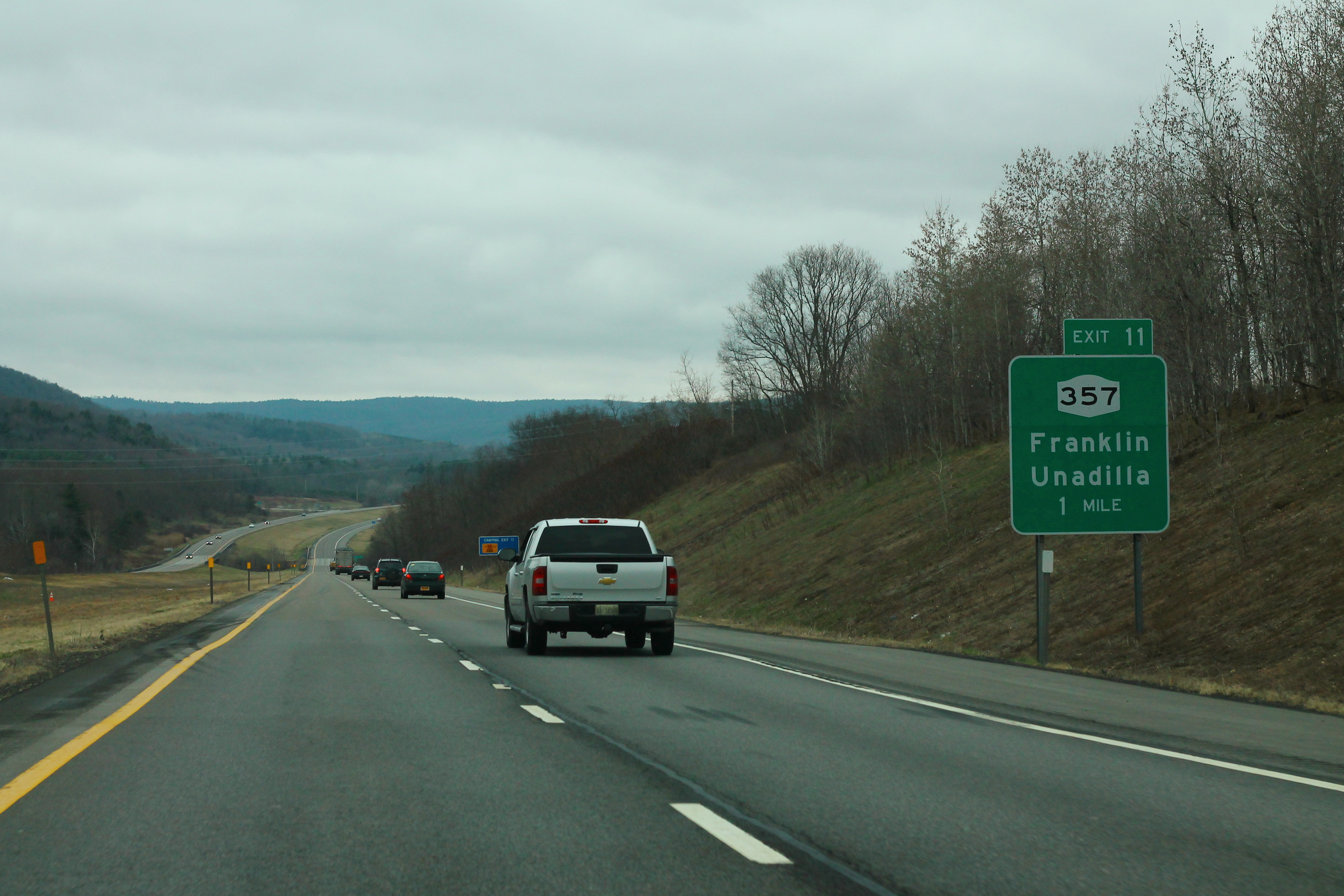
I-88 approaching its exit for NY 357

I-88 continues east to Harpursville, connecting to NY 79 near the center of the community at exit 16. Shortly after meeting NY 79, I-88 reenters a river valley, this time that of the Susquehanna River. I-88 heads to the northeast, following the river and NY 7 to Afton where it has an interchange with NY 41 exit 23. It continues to Bainbridge where it meets NY 206 and then on to Sidney, where it meets NY 8, the primary north–south road through the village, at exit 33. From Sidney, I-88 progresses northeast through southern Otsego County. It passes Unadilla, accessed by exit 37, then connects to NY 357 at exit 40. The expressway continues and reaches exit 46 which connects to Otego via NY 911J. It continues northeastward before entering Oneonta. Within the city, I-88 interchanges with NY 205 ahead of exit 55 with Main Street, which is the former routing of NY 28. The next interchange I-88 intersects NY 23 and NY 28 joins the expressway, following I-88 out of the city.

=== Oneonta to Schenectady ===
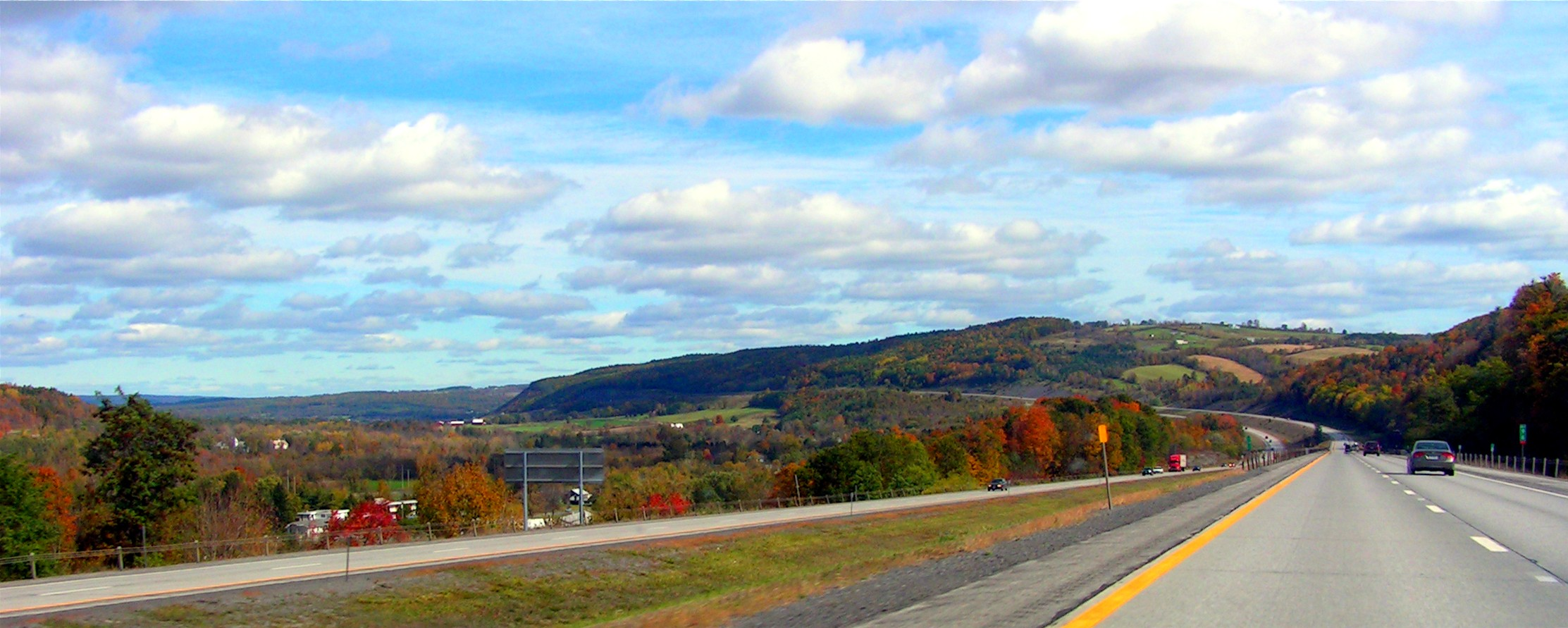
Eastbound on I-88 in Schoharie County

Northeast of Oneonta, NY 28 leaves I-88 at exit 61 to follow the Susquehanna River northward toward Cooperstown. I-88, however, remains on a northeasterly track through rural eastern Otsego County. Upon crossing into Schoharie County, I-88 begins to follow an easterly routing as it heads toward Cobleskill. While NY 7 enters the village, I-88 passes south of it, connecting to the village via two exits with NY 7. East of Cobleskill, I-88 interchanges with NY 145. Howe Caverns, a regionally popular attraction, is located a short distance north of the exit. I-88 continues onward, skirting the northern edge of Schoharie before passing into Schenectady County.

Shortly after entering Schenectady County, I-88 meets US 20 east of Duanesburg. Past US 20, I-88 continues northeast, interchanging with NY 7 for one final time before ending at the New York State Thruway (I-90) in western Schenectady.

== History ==
The 1956 National System of Interstate and Defense Highways Act did not include I-88. New York state officials pressed for addition of the route, and funding was included in the Federal-Aid Highway Act of 1968. Right-of-way acquisition started immediately afterward, and I-88 was added to the Interstate Highway System on December 13, 1968. As originally planned by the New York State Department of Transportation (NYSDOT), I-88 would begin at I-81 in Binghamton and follow the proposed Susquehanna Expressway to Schenectady, from where it would continue to US 4 in Troy over "Alternate Route 7", the limited-access alignment of NY 7 through the northern suburbs of Albany. This would have been accomplished by having I-88 meet the New York State Thruway at exit 25, where it would connect to I-890. I-88 would continue to Troy over I-890 and an upgraded NY 7.

In the early 1980s, the proposed connection with I-890 was scrapped in favor of a connection located to the west of exit 25 in Rotterdam. The extension to Troy was also eventually shelved, and thus the planned connections to the Adirondack Northway (I-87) and the toll-free part of I-90 between Thruway exit 24 and exit B1 on the Berkshire Connector were never built. As a result, the Thruway tolls are waived for all traffic that enters at exit 25A and heads west to exit 26 (I-890) or east to either exit 25 or 24 (I-890 or I-87/I-90, respectively).

The first section of I-88 to open was the piece between Chenango Bridge (exit 2) and Sanitaria Springs (exit 8 (old exit 4)), which opened in the early 1970s. A second piece near Oneonta between exits 53 (old exit 13) and 56 (old exit 15) was opened to traffic c. 1974. Construction progressed southwestward from Oneonta, with the freeway reaching Nineveh (exit 16 (old exit 6)) by 1977. The gap between Sanitaria Springs and Nineveh was filled by 1981. The focus then moved to the section of the expressway between Oneonta and Schenectady, which was completed from Oneonta to Duanesburg (exit 111 (old exit 24)) by 1981. The Duanesburg–Schenectady leg of I-88 was opened to traffic by 1985. In 1989, construction concluded on I-88 with the opening of the final portion of I-88 between I-81 in Chenango and NY 7 in Chenango Bridge.

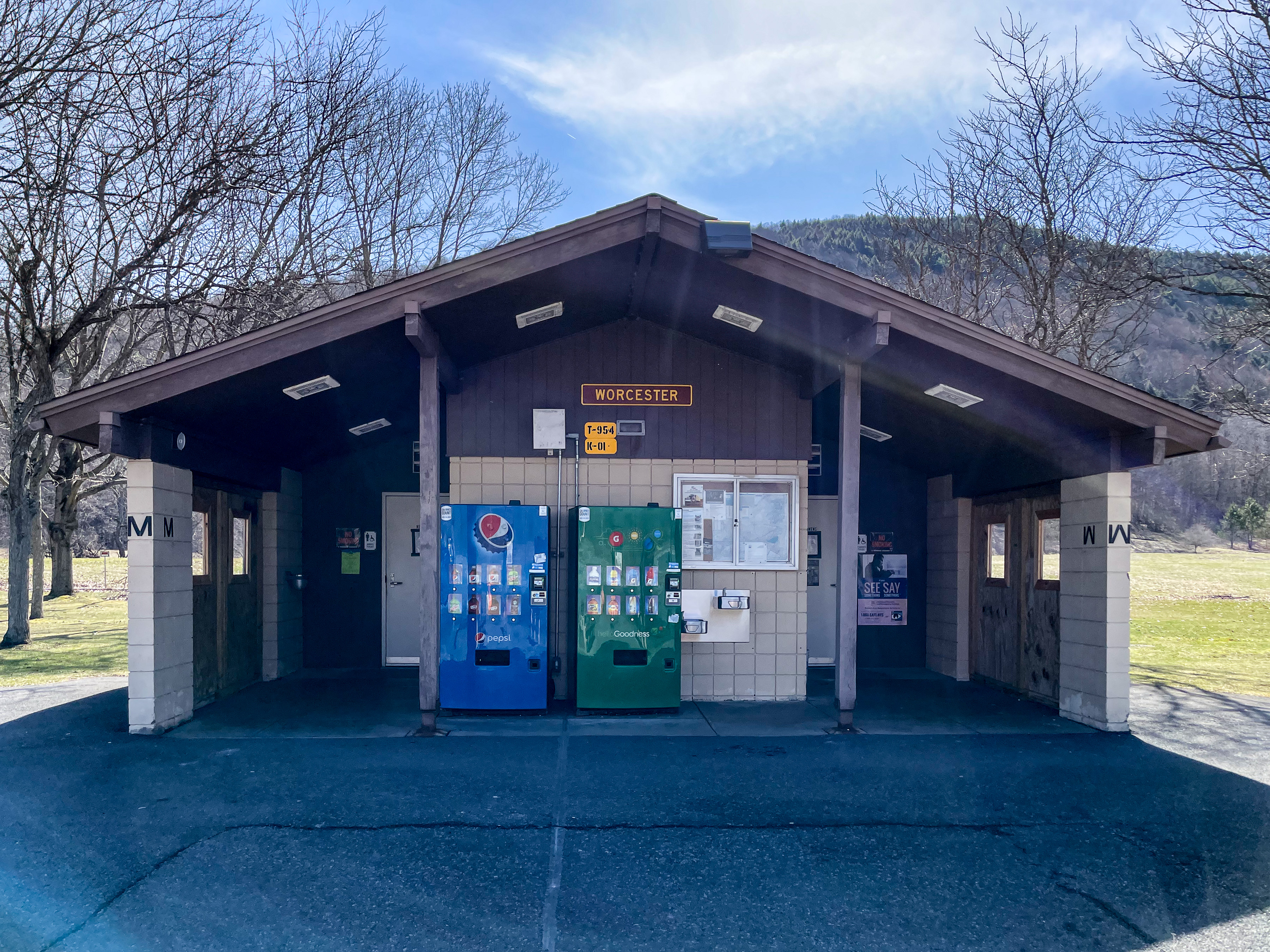
Rest area in Worcester

In 1999 NYSDOT, the Federal Highway Administration (FHWA) and the New York State Thruway Authority (NYSTA) discussed redesignating the Berkshire Connector as I-90 and redesignating the nontoll part of I-90 from Thruway exit 24 to exit B1 on the Berkshire Connector as I-88. The section of the Thruway between exits 25 and 24 would then be codesignated as I-90 and I-88. This was never implemented.

=== 2006 flood ===
As a result of the June 2006 flooding in Upstate New York and Northeastern Pennsylvania, Carrs Creek washed out a 50-foot (15 m) section of I-88 southwest of Unadilla on June 28. Around 6:20 am, two trucks from different directions drove into the chasm, apparently unaware of it, killing both drivers. David Swingle, 42, of Waverly, who was driving eastbound, was identified shortly after the accident. The westbound trucker was Patrick O'Connell, 55, of Lisbon, Maine. His body was found downstream several days after the water receded.

NYSDOT started construction to replace the section of highway almost immediately, and it was reopened August 31. Families of both victims planned to sue the state of New York for the incidents.

== Exit list ==
County	Location	mi	km	Old exit	New exit	Destinations	Notes
Broome	Dickinson	0.00	0.00			I-81 to I-86 / NY 17 – Binghamton, Syracuse	Western terminus
Broome	Fenton	0.70	1.13		1	NY 7 west – Binghamton, Port Dickinson	Westbound exit and eastbound entrance; western end of NY 7 concurrency
Broome	Fenton	2.41	3.88		2	NY 12A west to NY 12 – Chenango Bridge	NY 12 not signed eastbound; eastern terminus of NY 12A
Broome	Fenton	4.66	7.50	3	4	NY 7B east / NY 369 north – Port Crane	Western terminus of NY 7B; southern terminus of NY 369
Broome	Colesville	7.83	12.60	4	8	NY 7 east / NY 7B west – Sanitaria Springs	Eastern end of NY 7 concurrency; eastern terminus of NY 7B
Broome	Colesville	12.06	19.41	5	12	Martin Hill Road to NY 7 – Belden	NY 7 not signed eastbound
Broome	Colesville	16.05	25.83	6	16	NY 79 – Harpursville, Nineveh	
Broome	Colesville	17.42	28.03	Susquehanna River			
Chenango	Town of Afton	23.37	37.61	7	23	NY 41 – Afton	
Chenango	Town of Bainbridge	29.47	47.43	8	29	NY 206 – Bainbridge, Masonville	Masonville not signed westbound
Delaware	Town of Sidney	33.09	53.25	9	33	NY 8 – Sidney, Masonville	Masonville not signed eastbound
Delaware	Town of Sidney	37.37	60.14	10	37	To NY 7 – Unadilla	Access via NY 991H
Delaware	Town of Sidney	39.50	63.57	Unadilla Rest Area Rest Area (eastbound)			
Delaware	Town of Sidney	40.58	65.31	11	40	NY 357 – Unadilla, Franklin	
Delaware	Town of Sidney	42.40	68.24	Wells Bridge Rest Area Rest Area (westbound)			
Otsego	Town of Otego	46.88	75.45	12	46	To NY 7 – Otego, Wells Bridge	Access via NY 991J
Otsego	Town of Otego	51.01	82.09	Susquehanna River			
Otsego	Oneonta	53.59	86.24	13	53	NY 205 north to NY 23 west – Oneonta, Morris	Southern terminus of NY 205
Otsego	Oneonta	55.82	89.83	14	55	Main Street (NY 992D) to NY 28	Eastbound exit and westbound entrance
Otsego	Oneonta	56.72	91.28	15	56	NY 23 / NY 28 south – Oneonta, Davenport	Western end of NY 28 concurrency; NY 28 not signed eastbound
Otsego	Town of Oneonta	58.74	94.53	16	58	CR 47 – Emmons, Davenport Center	
Otsego	Town of Milford	61.06	98.27	17	61	NY 28 north to NY 7 – Colliersville, Cooperstown	Eastern end of NY 28 concurrency
Otsego	Maryland	71.01	114.28	18	71	Schenevus	Access via CR 56
Otsego	Worcester	73.60	118.45	West Worcester Rest Area (eastbound)			
Otsego	Worcester	76.59	123.26	19	76	To NY 7 – Worcester, East Worcester	Access via NY 992J
Otsego	Worcester	78.90	126.98	East Worcester Rest Area (westbound)			
Schoharie	Town of Richmondville	87.94	141.53	20	87	NY 7 / NY 10 – Richmondville	Access via NY 992K
Schoharie	Town of Richmondville	90.07	144.95	21	90	To NY 7 / NY 10 – Warnerville, Cobleskill	Access via NY 992L
Schoharie	Town of Cobleskill	95.24	153.27	22	95	NY 145 to NY 7 – Cobleskill, Middleburgh	
Schoharie	Town of Schoharie	101.12	162.74	23	101	NY 30A to NY 7 / NY 30 – Schoharie, Central Bridge	
Schenectady	Duanesburg	111.93	180.13	24	111	To US 20 / NY 7 – Duanesburg	
Schenectady	Rotterdam	116.75– 116.80	187.89– 187.97	25	116	To NY 7 – Rotterdam, Schenectady	Access via Becker Road; last eastbound exit before toll
Schenectady	Rotterdam	117.70	189.42			I-90 Toll / New York Thruway to I-87 – Albany, Buffalo	Eastern terminus; exit 25A on I-90 / Thruway
1.000 mi = 1.609 km; 1.000 km = 0.621 mi: Concurrency terminus; Electronic toll collection; Incomplete access
