= Kenyon Residences =

Historic houses in New York, United States

- U.S. National Register of Historic Places
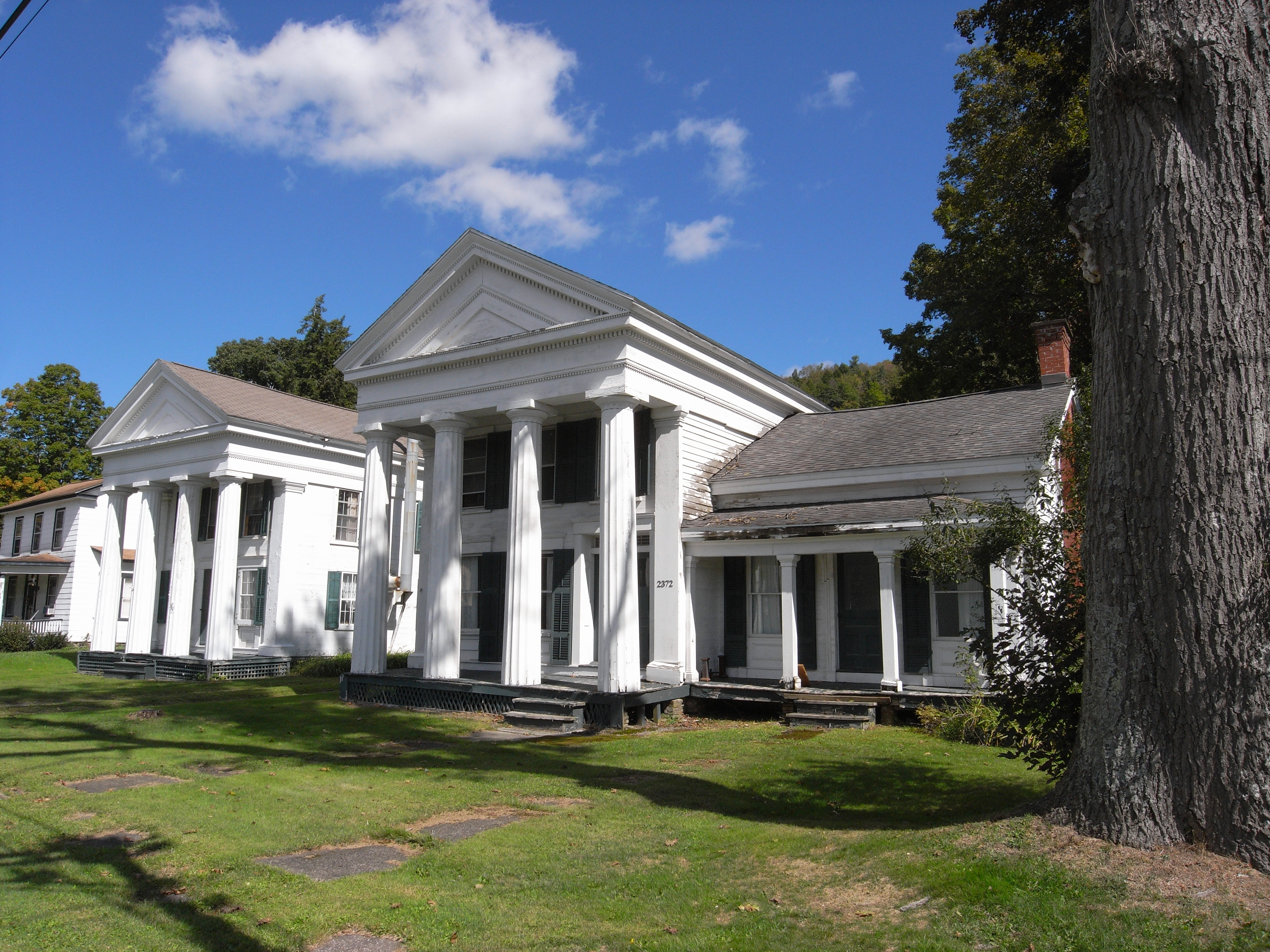
- Kenyon Residences, September 2012

- Location within New York Location within the United States
- Location: 60 and 62 Main St., Mt. Vision, New York
- Coordinates: 42°34′45″N 75°3′30″W
- Area: less than one acre
- Architect: Kenyon, Isaac E. and Alfred B.
- Architectural style: Greek Revival
- NRHP reference No.: 04000093
- Added to NRHP: February 26, 2004

Kenyon Residences, also known as Twin Sisters, is a pair of historic home and located at Mt. Vision in Otsego County, New York. They are a pair of Greek Revival style 2-story, wood-frame dwellings. They both have temple form facades characterized by Doric order columns supporting over scaled, elaborately embellished pediments. The house at 62 Main St. was built between 1839 and 1851. The main block of the house at 60 Main St. was also built between 1839 and 1851, with a three-room, 1 1/2-story wing added about 1859. Also on the property is a shed.

It was listed on the National Register of Historic Places in 2004.
