= Lunn-Musser Octagon Barn =

- U.S. National Register of Historic Places
- Location within New York Location within the United States
- Location: South of Garrattsville, near Garrattsville, New York
- Coordinates: 42°37′39″N 75°9′26″W
- Area: less than one acre
- Built: 1885; 141 years ago
- Architectural style: Octagon Mode
- MPS: Central Plan Dairy Barns of New York TR
- NRHP reference No.: 84002897
- Added to NRHP: September 29, 1984

Lunn-Musser Octagon Barn is a historic barn located near Garrattsville in Otsego County, New York. Built in 1885, it is a two-story, octagonal wood frame and stone structure with a hipped roof and an octagonal cupola. It measures 60 feet in diameter. and meets the definition of a round barn.

It was added to the National Register of Historic Places in 1984.
