= Southside Mall (Oneonta, New York) =

- Location: Oneonta (town), New York
- Coordinates: 42.4472°N 75.045°W
- Address: 5006 New York Highway 23
- Opened: 1982
- Developer: Tristate Ventures
- Owner: Fameco Real Estate
- Num. of stores: 30+
- Num. of anchor tenants: 5
- Floor area: 242,000 square feet (22,000 m^{2})
- Floors: 1

Southside Mall is an enclosed shopping mall in Oneonta (town), New York. It opened in 1983 and features Dick's Sporting Goods, Harbor Freight, J. C. Penney, Michaels, and TJ Maxx as its anchor stores. It is managed by Fameco Real Estate.

== History ==
The mall opened June 30, 1983, featuring Kmart, Great American supermarket (now Michaels), and J. C. Penney. For dining, Applebee's has served the mall patrons since 2002. Kmart closed in 2003. The mall was sold by Glimcher Realty Trust in 2005.

Bed Bath & Beyond was added in 2007, but was replaced by Harbor Freight Tools in 2019. In October 2007, Steve & Barry's signed a lease to open in the vacant Kmart. However, the store never opened, due to that chain's bankruptcy and structural problems with the roof. In 2010, the former Kmart building was partially demolished for a TJ Maxx. Dick's Sporting Goods and Petco followed in 2012.

On December 3, 2018, it was announced that Bed, Bath & Beyond would be closing in early 2019.
