= Lake of the Twin Fawns =

Lake in Otsego County, New York, United States

- Location of Lake of the Twin Fawns within New York State
- Location: Otsego County, New York
- Coordinates: 42°35′40″N 75°08′28″W
- Primary inflows: Lake Brook
- Primary outflows: Lake Brook, Unnamed Creek
- Surface area: 24 acres (9.7 ha)
- Surface elevation: 1,594 feet (486 m)
- Settlements: Laurens

Lake of the Twin Fawns also called "Duck Pond" is a small lake in Otsego County, New York. It is located northwest of Laurens within Gilbert Lake State Park. Lake of the Twin Fawns either drains west via an unnamed creek which flows into Stony Creek or south via Lake Brook which flows into Gilbert Lake.
