= West End, New York =

- Census-designated place
- Location within the state of New York
- Coordinates: 42°27′20″N 75°5′56″W
- Country: United States
- State: New York
- County: Otsego

Area
  - Total: 3.73 sq mi (9.66 km^{2})
  - Land: 3.65 sq mi (9.46 km^{2})
  - Water: 0.073 sq mi (0.19 km^{2})
- Elevation: 1,480 ft (450 m)

Population (2020)
  - Total: 1,864
  - Density: 510.1/sq mi (196.95/km^{2})
- Time zone: UTC-5 (Eastern (EST))
  - Summer (DST): UTC-4 (EDT)
- ZIP code: 13820
- Area code: 607
- FIPS code: 36-79796
- GNIS feature ID: 1867423

West End is an unincorporated suburban community (and census-designated place) in Otsego County, New York, United States. As of the 2020 census, West End had a population of 1,864.

West End is in the town of Oneonta, directly northwest of the city of Oneonta.

== Geography ==
West End is located at 42°27′20″N 75°5′56″W (42.455516, -75.098969).

According to the United States Census Bureau, the CDP has a total area of 3.7 square miles (9.7 km^{2}), of which 3.7 square miles (9.5 km^{2}) is land and 0.077 square miles (0.2 km^{2}), or 2.03%, is water.

== Demographics ==
Historical population
Census	Pop.	Note	%±
2020	1,864		—
U.S. Decennial Census

As of the census of 2000, there were 1,813 people, 804 households, and 501 families residing in the CDP. The population density was 480.2 inhabitants per square mile (185.4/km^{2}). There were 877 housing units at an average density of 232.3 per square mile (89.7/km^{2}). The racial makeup of the CDP was 97.24% White, 0.66% African American, 0.28% Native American, 1.10% Asian, 0.11% from other races, and 0.61% from two or more races. Hispanic or Latino of any race were 2.10% of the population.

There were 804 households, out of which 26.2% had children under the age of 18 living with them, 45.9% were married couples living together, 11.6% had a female householder with no husband present, and 37.6% were non-families. 31.7% of all households were made up of individuals, and 16.2% had someone living alone who was 65 years of age or older. The average household size was 2.23 and the average family size was 2.76.

In the CDP, the population was spread out, with 21.7% under the age of 18, 6.0% from 18 to 24, 25.9% from 25 to 44, 24.9% from 45 to 64, and 21.5% who were 65 years of age or older. The median age was 43 years. For every 100 females, there were 91.2 males. For every 100 females age 18 and over, there were 87.0 males.

The median income for a household in the CDP was $28,621, and the median income for a family was $31,628. Males had a median income of $30,043 versus $20,568 for females. The per capita income for the CDP was $16,153. About 10.9% of families and 14.9% of the population were below the poverty line, including 23.1% of those under age 18 and none of those age 65 or over.
