= Gilbert Lake State Park =

State park in Otsego County, New York

- Location within New York
- Type: State park
- Location: 18 CCC Road; Laurens, New York
- Nearest city: Laurens, New York
- Coordinates: 42°35′12″N 75°07′57″W
- Area: 1,584 acres (6.41 km^{2})
- Created: 1926
- Operator: New York State Office of Parks, Recreation and Historic Preservation
- Visitors: 77,959 (in 2014)
- Open: All year
- Website: Gilbert Lake State Park

Gilbert Lake State Park is a 1,584-acre (6.41 km^{2}) state park in Otsego County, New York, United States. Most of the park is in the Town of New Lisbon, in the foothills of the Catskill Mountains east of the community of New Lisbon and north of Oneonta. Gilbert Lake and Lake of the Twin Fawns are located within the park.

== History ==
Gilbert Lake State Park was among the first parks developed by New York State in Central New York. Acquisition of land for Gilbert Lake State Park, which sits upon lands previously used for timber production, began in October 1926. Development of the park began soon afterward, and was accelerated by the presence of a Civilian Conservation Corps camp between 1933 and 1941. The CCC undertook various improvement tasks, including building numerous cabins, constructing dams, establishing a wildlife refuge, enacting erosion control, and building a network of roads and trails.

== Park description ==
The park offers a beach, kayak and paddleboard rentals, cabins, a campground, disc golf, hunting and fishing, hiking and biking, picnic tables and pavilions, a museum, a nature trail, playgrounds, recreation programs, snowmobiling and cross-country skiing, ice-fishing, and a food concession.

The park includes the New York State Civilian Conservation Corps Museum, which features memorabilia, photographs, printed materials and exhibits about the works of the Civilian Conservation Corps in the park and in other parks in New York and the United States.

== See also ==
- List of New York state parks
