= Butternut Creek (Unadilla River tributary) =

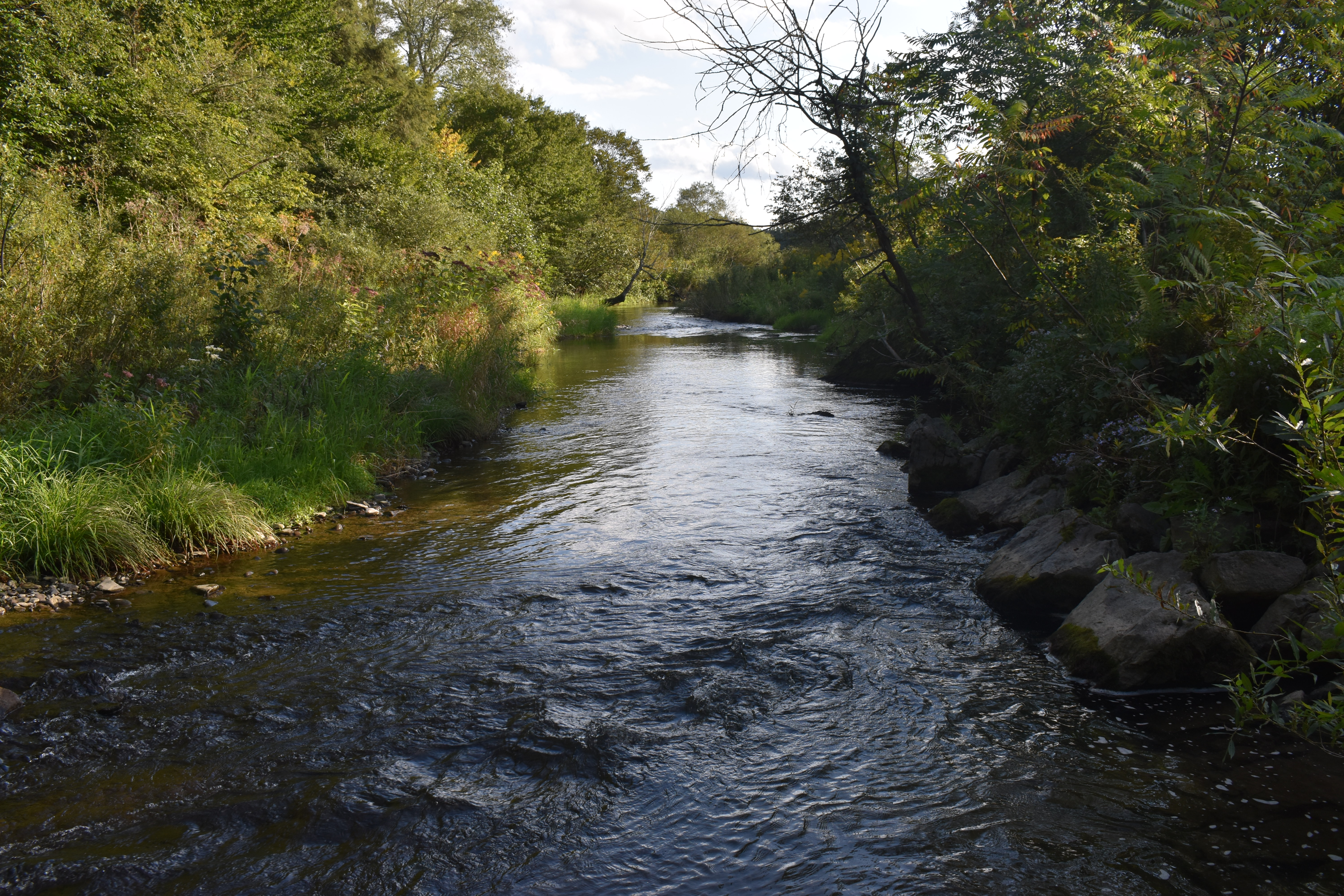
- Looking downstream from Bell Hill Road by Garrattsville

- Location of the mouth of Butternut Creek Butternut Creek (Unadilla River tributary) (the United States)

Location
- Country: United States
- State: New York

Physical characteristics
- Mouth: Unadilla River
  - location: Mount Upton, New York
  - coordinates: 42°24′55″N 75°22′30″W
  - elevation: 1,000 ft (300 m)
- Length: 37 mi (60 km)
- Basin size: 130 mi^{2} (340 km^{2})

Basin features
- Progression: Butternut Creek → Unadilla River → Susquehanna River → Chesapeake Bay → Atlantic Ocean
- Tributaries
  - left: Stony Creek, Cahoon Creek, Shaw Brook
  - right: Calhoun Creek, Morris Brook, Thorp Brook, Coye Brook, Dunderberg Creek, Halbert Brook, Dry Brook

Butternut Creek is a 37-mile-long (60 km) river in the state of New York. It converges with the Unadilla River just downstream of Mount Upton. The creek has many fish for fishing dominated by largemouth bass, smallmouth bass, wall-eye, chain pickerel, rock bass, and yellow perch.

The Mohawk called the creek the Tienuderrah. General Jacob Morris visited the area in 1787, and described Butternut Creek as "the handsomest navigable creek I ever lay my eyes upon."

== Tributaries ==
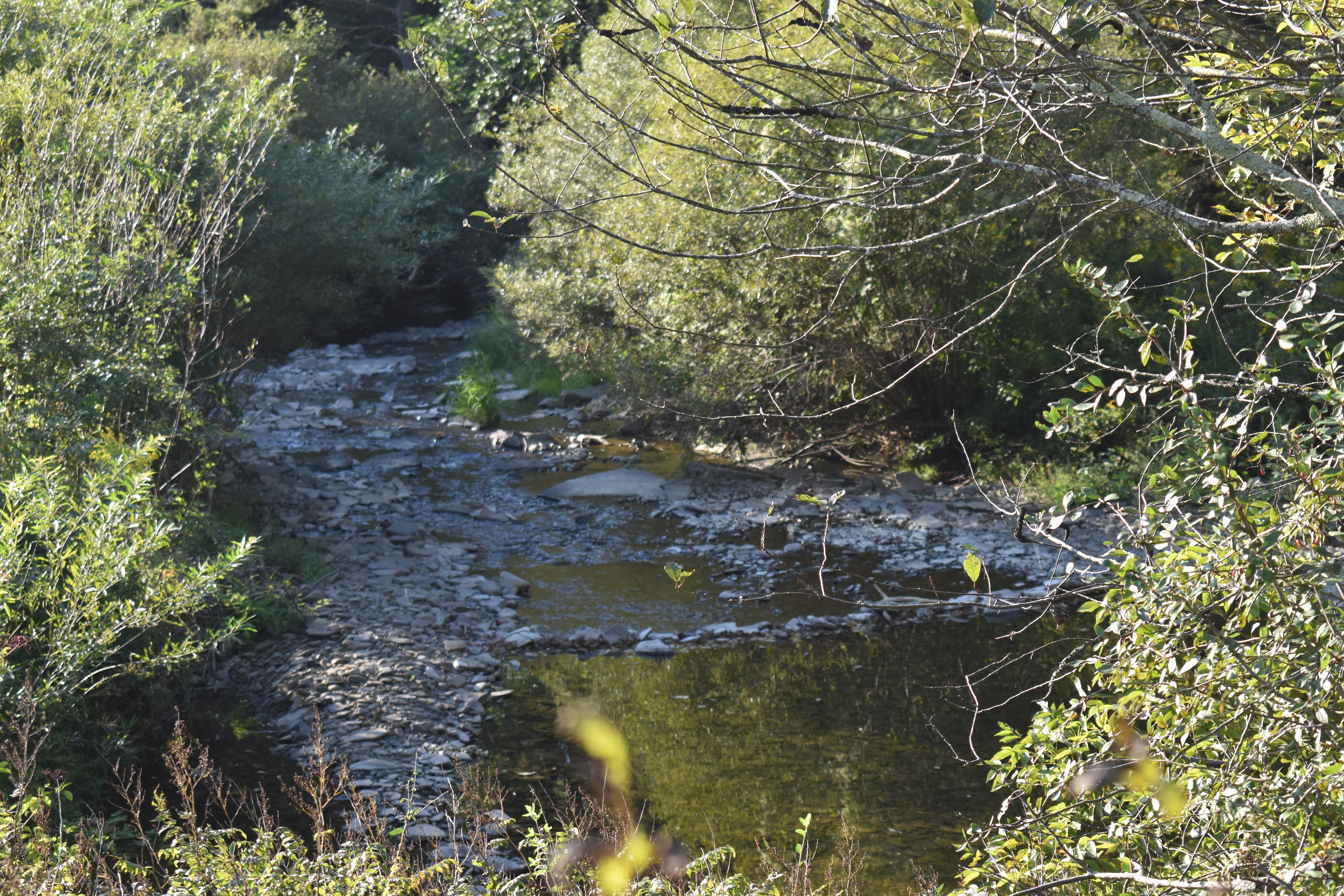
Stony Clove Creek downstream of Parker Road.

Stony Creek flows into the creek northwest of New Lisbon. Shaw Brook flows into the creek south-southwest of Gilbertsville. Cahoon Creek flows into the creek east of Gilbertsville. Dunderberg Creek flows into the creek east of Gilbertsville. Calhoun Creek flows into the creek southeast of Morris. Morris Brook starts just east of Shacktown Mountain and flows south into Allen Pond. It exits Allen Pond and continues flowing south through Dimock Hollow before flowing into Morris Pond. It exits Morris Pond and flows southeast before converging with Butternut Creek southwest of Morris. Thorp Brook flows into the creek northeast of Gilbertsville. Coye Brook flows into the creek northeast of Gilbertsville. Halbert Brook flows into the creek southwest of Gilbertsville. Dry Brook flows into the creek southwest of Gilbertsville. Dry Brook was formally known as "Copes Brook".
