= Southern New York Railway =

Electric railroad in upstate New York, U.S.

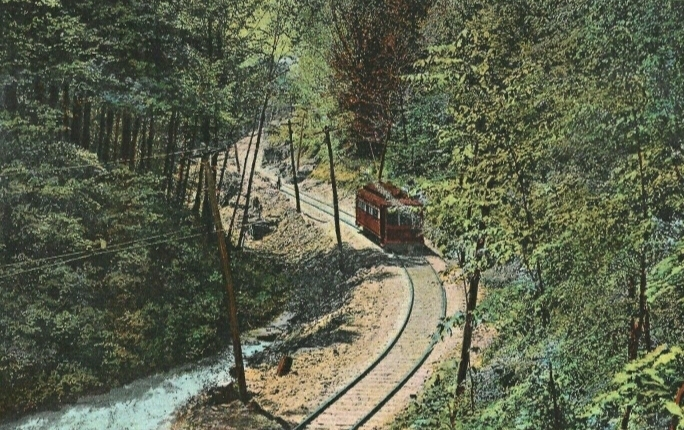
- Tracks near Hartwick, New York

Overview
- Other name(s): Oneonta-Mohawk Trolley Line
- Status: Ceased operation
- Locale: Otsego County and Herkimer County, New York
- Termini: Mohawk, New York; Oneonta, New York

History
- Opened: 1888
- Closed: 1970

Technical
- Line length: 45.5 mi (73.2 km)
- Number of tracks: 1
- Track gauge: 4 ft 8 1/2 in (1,435 mm)
- Electrification: Overhead line

The Southern New York Railway (SNY) was an electric rail line that provided passenger and freight service, but also provided electricity for customers along the line until 1924. The railway was previously called Oneonta Street Railway (1888-1897), Oneonta & Otego Valley Railroad (1897-1900), Oneonta, Cooperstown & Richfield Springs Railway (1900-1906), Oneonta & Mohawk Valley Railway (1906-1908), Otsego & Herkimer Railroad (1908-1916), Southern New York Power & Railway Co. (1916-1924), and Southern New York Railroad (1924-1970).

== History ==
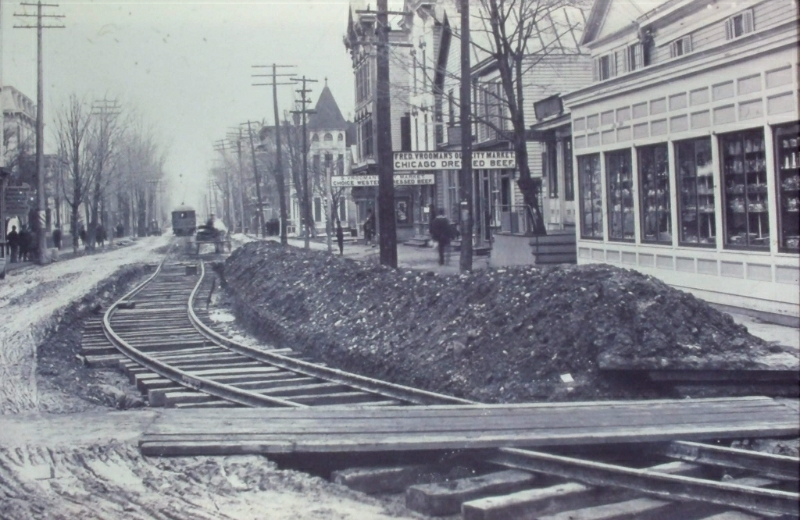
Line being built along Lake Street in Richfield Springs c. 1904

The line was laid north from Oneonta. It reached Laurens in July 1901, Cooperstown in September 1901, Richfield Springs in the summer of 1902, and Mohawk by 1906. A car barn, powerhouse, and dispatcher office were built in Hartwick. There was also a substation to power the line by the station in Schuyler Lake. On April 19, 1901, the Village Trustees of Cooperstown unanimously voted to allow the line to enter the village via Chestnut Street to Main Street, on the condition that no car carrying freight run on village streets except from the southern village boundary to the CACV Railroad.

By the 1920s, ridership numbers were falling. While the SNY still carried 61,403 passengers in 1928, the figure fell to 14,118 passengers in 1931. In 1933, the SNY ended rail passenger service to concentrate on rail freight and the bus operations started in 1926.

In 1939, the SNY was sold to the H.E. Salzberg Company. Full operations continued for a year, but service to Cooperstown was ended in 1940 and in 1941, permission was granted to abandon the line from West Oneonta to Jordanville. The 1.5 mile stretch from Oneonta to West Oneonta was retained and freight service was offered with diesel locomotives. In January 1970, the SNY requested to close the remaining operation after the state Department of Transportation announced that a new connection road between the proposed Interstate 88 and state Route 23 would cut the line. Freight service ended on May 7, 1970, and the ICC approved the abandonment on March 26, 1971. The tracks were lifted in July 1971.

== Route ==
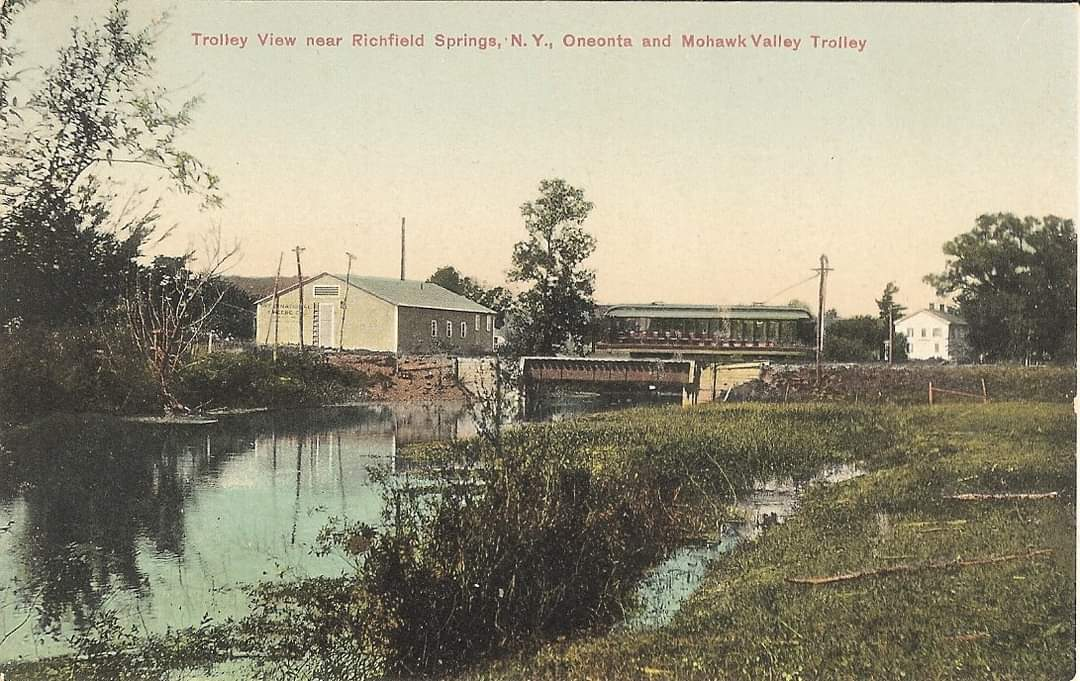
Trolley crossing oaks creek by Schuler Lake in 1907
