= Garrattsville, New York =

- Hamlet and CDP
- Location within the state of New York
- Coordinates: 42°38′50″N 75°10′19″W
- Country: United States
- State: New York
- County: Otsego
- Town: New Lisbon

Area
  - Total: 1.42 sq mi (3.69 km^{2})
- Elevation: 1,302 ft (397 m)
- Time zone: UTC-5 (Eastern (EST))
  - Summer (DST): UTC-4 (EDT)
- ZIP code: 13342
- Area code: 607

Garrattsville is a hamlet (and census-designated place) in Otsego County, New York, United States. As of the 2020 census, Garrattsville had a population of 120. It is located in the town of New Lisbon at the intersection of Otsego County Route 16 and New York State Route 51. Butternut Creek flows southwest through the hamlet.
