= West Oneonta, New York =

- Hamlet
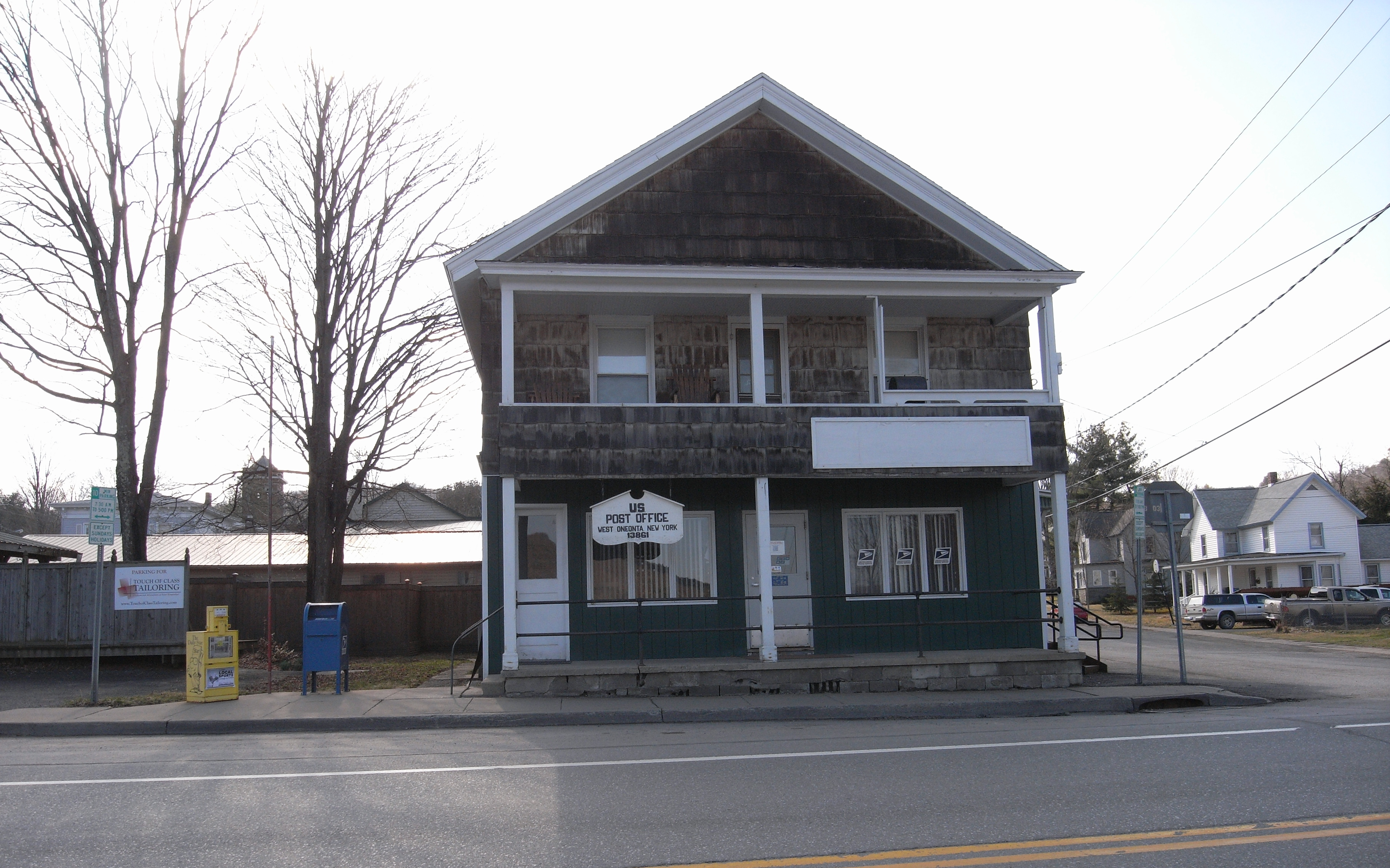
- Post Office

- Location within New York Location within the United States
- Coordinates: 42°28′20″N 75°07′02″W
- Country: United States
- State: New York
- County: Otsego
- Town: Oneonta
- Elevation: 1,138 ft (347 m)
- Time zone: UTC-5 (Eastern (EST))
  - Summer (DST): UTC-4 (EDT)
- ZIP code: 13861
- Area code: 607
- GNIS feature ID: 970832

West Oneonta is a hamlet in Otsego County, New York, United States. According to the 2010 U.S. Census, West Oneonta had a population of 319. The community is located along New York State Route 23, 3 miles (4.8 km) west-northwest of Oneonta. West Oneonta has a post office with ZIP code 13861.
