= Carrs Creek =

- Location of the mouth of Carrs Creek

Location
- Country: United States
- State: New York
- County: Delaware

Physical characteristics
- Source
  - coordinates: 42°16′21″N 75°09′34″W
- Mouth: Susquehanna River
  - coordinates: 42°19′01″N 75°20′08″W
  - elevation: 981 ft (299 m)

Carrs Creek is a river in Delaware County, New York. It flows into the Susquehanna River northeast of South Unadilla.
