= Gilbert Lake (New York) =

- Location of Gilbert Lake within New York State
- Location: Otsego County, New York
- Coordinates: 42°34′51″N 75°07′42″W, 42°34′46″N 75°07′30″W
- Type: Lake
- Primary inflows: Lake Brook
- Primary outflows: Lake Brook
- Surface area: 39 acres (16 ha)
- Surface elevation: 1,512 feet (461 m)
- Settlements: Laurens

Gilbert Lake is a small lake in Otsego County, New York. It is located northwest of Laurens within Gilbert Lake State Park. Lake Brook flows through the lake, then flows southeast before converging with Otego Creek. Lake of the Twin Fawns, located northwest of Gilbert Lake, drains south via Lake Brook into Gilbert Lake.

== Fishing ==
Fish species present in the lake are largemouth bass, rainbow trout, pumpkinseed sunfish. The lake is accessed by a state-owned carry down boat launch in Gilbert Lake State Park.
