= Maryland, New York =

- Town
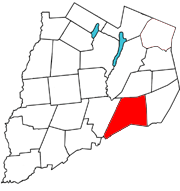
- Otsego County map with the Town of Maryland in red
- Coordinates: 42°32′N 74°52′W
- Country: United States
- State: New York
- County: Otsego

Area
  - Total: 52.54 sq mi (136.08 km^{2})
  - Land: 52.41 sq mi (135.73 km^{2})
  - Water: 0.14 sq mi (0.35 km^{2})
- Elevation: 1,276 ft (389 m)

Population (2010)
  - Total: 1,897
  - Estimate (2016): 1,805
  - Density: 34/sq mi (13.3/km^{2})
- Time zone: UTC-5 (Eastern (EST))
  - Summer (DST): UTC-4 (EDT)
- ZIP code: 12116
- Area code: 607
- FIPS code: 36-45920
- GNIS feature ID: 0979203
- Website: www.marylandny.org

Maryland is a town in Otsego County, New York, United States. The population was 1,897 at the 2010 census. It was named for the U.S. state of the same name. The Town of Maryland is on the county's southern border. It is northeast of the City of Oneonta.

== History ==
The town was first settled around 1790 in the southwest part of the town.

Maryland was erected from the Town of Worcester in 1808.

From about 1909 until 1912, an extensive lumber operation by Emmons L. Peck of Carbondale, Pennsylvania, utilizing a steam tramway which straddled the county line on South Hill east of Mud Lake, shipping finished lumber from Burnsides Switch on the D&HRR. Peck's personal cabin was later dismantled and rebuilt in the hamlet of Maryland next to the present post office. During World War I, Porter Brothers contracted to build the third rail for the D&HRR "bridge line" through Maryland and Worcester to allow larger eastbound freight trains without extra locomotives to clear Richmondville Hill by an alternate route, much of which was later obliterated by I-88 construction.

== Geography ==
According to the United States Census Bureau, the town has a total area of 51.9 square miles (134 km^{2}), of which 51.8 square miles (134 km^{2}) is land and 0.1 square miles (0.26 km^{2}) (0.21%) is water. Interstate 88 and New York State Route 7 follows the east to west course of the Schenevus Creek. South Hill, an upland area, is partly in the southeastern quadrant of the town. The southern town line is the border of Delaware County.

== Demographics ==
Historical population
Census	Pop.	Note	%±
1820	1,439		—
1830	1,834		27.4%
1840	2,085		13.7%
1850	2,152		3.2%
1860	2,228		3.5%
1870	402		−82.0%
1880	2,324		478.1%
1890	2,199		−5.4%
1900	1,998		−9.1%
1910	1,852		−7.3%
1920	1,529		−17.4%
1930	1,539		0.7%
1940	1,460		−5.1%
1950	1,556		6.6%
1960	1,386		−10.9%
1970	1,465		5.7%
1980	1,690		15.4%
1990	1,716		1.5%
2000	1,920		11.9%
2010	1,897		−1.2%
2016 (est.)	1,805		−4.8%
U.S. Decennial Census

As of the census of 2000, there were 1,920 people, 773 households, and 531 families residing in the town. The population density was 37.1 inhabitants per square mile (14.3/km^{2}). There were 1,035 housing units at an average density of 20.0 units per square mile (7.7 units/km^{2}). The racial makeup of the town was 98.80% White, 0.16% African American, 0.16% Asian, 0.05% from other races, and 0.83% from two or more races. Hispanic or Latino people of any race were 1.09% of the population.

There were 773 households, out of which 29.9% had children under the age of 18 living with them, 55.1% were married couples living together, 10.1% had a female householder with no husband present, and 31.2% were non-families. 24.2% of all households were made up of individuals, and 10.5% had someone living alone who was 65 years of age or older. The average household size was 2.48 and the average family size was 2.93.

In the town, the population was spread out, with 23.7% under the age of 18, 7.6% from 18 to 24, 26.1% from 25 to 44, 27.7% from 45 to 64, and 15.0% who were 65 years of age or older. The median age was 40 years. For every 100 females, there were 99.6 males. For every 100 females age 18 and over, there were 97.2 males.

The median income for a household in the town was $33,821, and the median income for a family was $39,020. Males had a median income of $27,245 versus $20,898 for females. The per capita income for the town was $16,120. About 9.4% of families and 12.6% of the population were below the poverty line, including 16.0% of those under age 18 and 9.5% of those age 65 or over.

== Communities and locations in Maryland ==
- Chaseville – A hamlet on NY-7 east of Maryland village
- Cooperstown Junction – At the southwestern corner on NY-7, where D&HRR connects with the Cooperstown and Charlotte Valley and formerly the Ulster & Delaware RR
- Crumhorn Mountain – An elevation partly in the town. On the mountain there is a Boy Scout Camp nearly a century old.
- Burnsides Switch – Siding on the Delaware & Hudson RR near Potato Creek Dip.
- Dog Hill – An elevation located northeast of Maryland
- Elk Creek – A hamlet located on County Road 34 and Schenevus Creek near the north town line
- Elk Creek – A stream flowing southward to Schenevus Creek
- Hooker Mountain – An elevation near the northern town line
- Maryland – The hamlet of Maryland is located on NY-7; it once had its own firehouse, usual stores, train station, a bobbin and acid factory. It still has a post office.
- Potato Creek Dip – west of hamlet of Maryland on NY-7, once noted for treacherous driving conditions in any season
- Schenevus – A hamlet north of NY-7 on County Road 34 and Elk Creek
- South Hill – A mountain range partly in the southern part of the town
