= Laurens (village), New York =

Laurens, New York
- Village
- Location within the state of New York
- Coordinates: 42°32′N 75°5′W
- Country: United States
- State: New York
- County: Otsego
- Town: Laurens

Area
  - Total: 0.13 sq mi (0.33 km^{2})
  - Land: 0.13 sq mi (0.33 km^{2})
  - Water: 0 sq mi (0.00 km^{2})
- Elevation: 1,112 ft (339 m)

Population (2020)
  - Total: 185
  - Density: 1,440.7/sq mi (556.27/km^{2})
- Time zone: UTC-5 (Eastern (EST))
  - Summer (DST): UTC-4 (EDT)
- ZIP code: 13796
- Area code: 607
- FIPS code: 36-41520
- GNIS feature ID: 2390935
- Website: villageoflaurensny.gov

Laurens is a village in Otsego County, New York, United States. The population was 263 at the 2010 census.

The Village of Laurens is in the eastern part of the Town of Laurens. It is also north of the City of Oneonta.

== History ==
Laurens is the oldest community in the town. Laurens set itself apart from the town by incorporating it as a village in 1811. It was named for Revolutionary War hero Henry Laurens. In 1860, the village had a population of 726 and contained a tannery, an iron foundry, a sawmill, and a cotton mill that was powered by water from Gilbert Lake, north of the town line in New Lisbon. A sulfur spring is located north of the village. The Southern New York Railroad route passed through Laurens, the first car reaching Laurens from Oneonta on July 4, 1901. A logging operator named Emmons Peck from Carbondale, Pennsylvania, would ship tanning bark and nine million feet of lumber from his mill at Gilbert Lake by horse and wagon to the Laurens station by 1909, employing many men.

In June 2025 the mayor of Laurens, Frank Kovacs, was indicted by a grand jury on two counts of rape and several related felonies. The alleged rape occurred a decade earlier, when the victim was a teenager. He was convicted October 8th 2026. Frank Kovacs was convicted with First Degree Rape from an incident that occurred at his place of residence on Dec. 15, 2018.

== Geography ==
Laurens is located at 42°32′N 75°5′W (42.5314, -75.0882).

According to the United States Census Bureau, the village has a total area of 0.1 square mile (0.3 km^{2}), all land.

The village is located at the junction of County Roads, 10, 11, and 12 near Otego Creek. New York State Route 205 runs just outside the eastern end of the village.

== Demographics ==
Historical population
Census	Pop.	Note	%±
1880	252		—
1890	255		1.2%
1900	233		−8.6%
1910	242		3.9%
1920	228		−5.8%
1930	246		7.9%
1940	203		−17.5%
1950	261		28.6%
1960	291		11.5%
1970	320		10.0%
1980	276		−13.7%
1990	293		6.2%
2000	277		−5.5%
2010	263		−5.1%
2020	185		−29.7%
U.S. Decennial Census

As of the census of 2000, there were 277 people, 114 households, and 77 families residing in the village. The population density was 2,215.8 inhabitants per square mile (855.5/km^{2}). There were 130 housing units at an average density of 1,039.9 per square mile (401.5/km^{2}). The racial makeup of the village was 98.56% White, and 1.44% from two or more races. Hispanic or Latino of any race were 1.44% of the population.

There were 114 households, out of which 36.8% had children under the age of 18 living with them, 44.7% were married couples living together, 17.5% had a female householder with no husband present, and 31.6% were non-families. 28.9% of all households were made up of individuals, and 10.5% had someone living alone who was 65 years of age or older. The average household size was 2.43 and the average family size was 2.88.

In the village, the population was spread out, with 29.2% under the age of 18, 5.8% from 18 to 24, 28.5% from 25 to 44, 22.4% from 45 to 64, and 14.1% who were 65 years of age or older. The median age was 39 years. For every 100 females, there were 92.4 males. For every 100 females age 18 and over, there were 96.0 males.

The median income for a household in the village was $27,125, and the median income for a family was $27,500. Males had a median income of $25,179 versus $18,750 for females. The per capita income for the village was $15,527. About 24.4% of families and 17.9% of the population were below the poverty line, including 33.3% of those under the age of eighteen and 8.6% of those 65 or over.
