= Otego Creek =

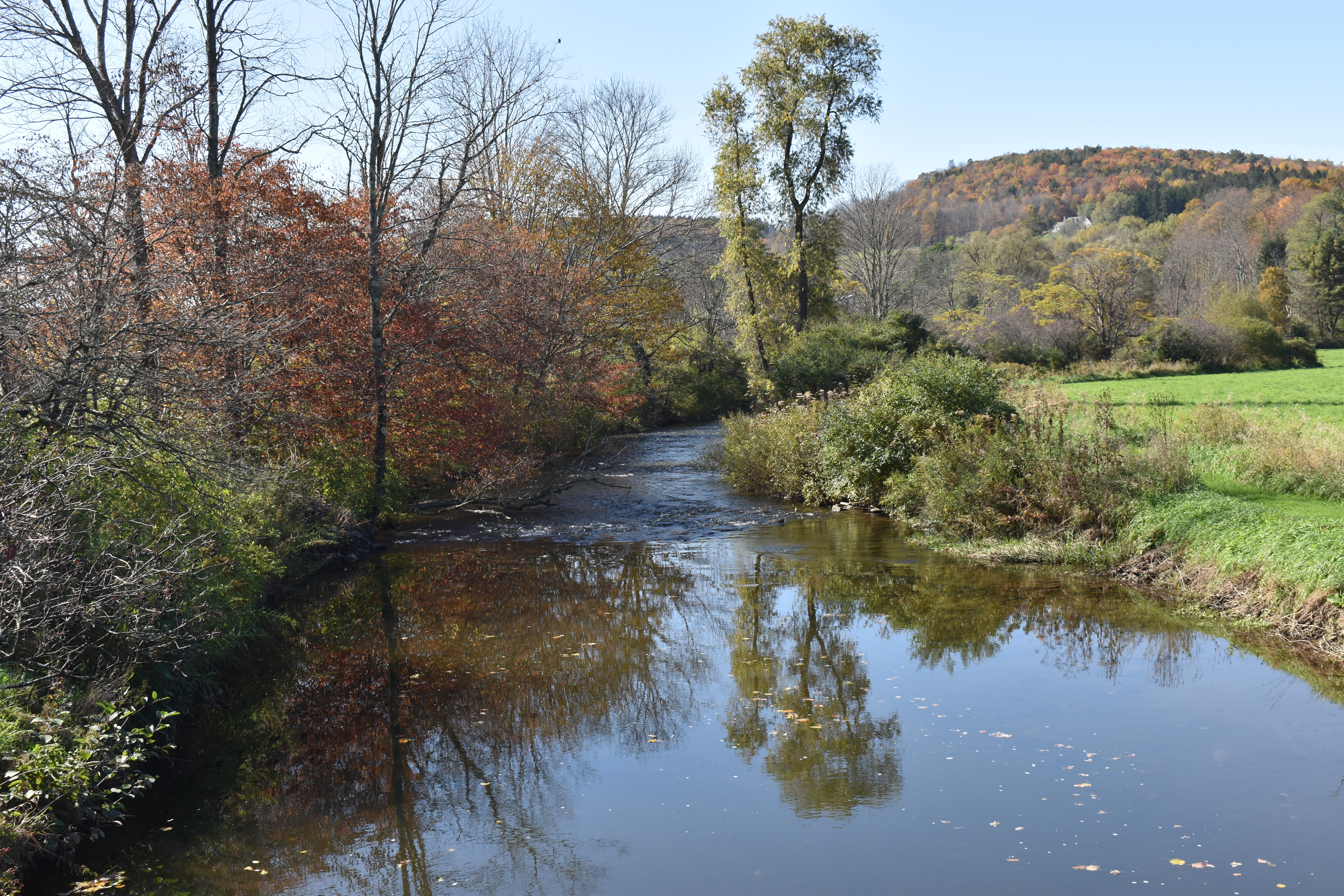
- Otego Creek downstream of Jones Crossing Road south of Hartwick

- Location of the mouth of Otego Creek Otego Creek (the United States)

Location
- Country: United States
- State: New York
- Region: Central New York Region
- County: Otsego

Physical characteristics
- Source
  - location: Otsego
  - coordinates: 42°43′00″N 75°01′33″W
- Mouth: Susquehanna River
  - location: Oneonta
  - coordinates: 42°25′39″N 75°07′22″W
- Length: 32.7 mi (52.6 km)

Basin features
- Tributaries
  - left: Keyes Brook
  - right: Clark Brook; West Branch Otego Creek; Pool Brook; Lake Brook; Wharton Creek; Harrison Creek; Rouggly Creek

Otego Creek is a 32.7-mile-long (52.6 km) tributary of the Susquehanna River in Otsego County, New York. Otego Creek rises in the Town of Otsego and flows south through the Towns of Hartwick and Laurens, before joining the Susquehanna River southwest of the City of Oneonta.

== History ==
On a 1790 map of Otsego County, Otego Creek is shown on the map as Adiga Creek.

== Tributaries ==
Clark Brook flows into Otego Creek north of Hartwick. West Branch Otego Creek flows into Otego Creek north of Mount Vision. Keyes Brook flows into Otego Creek south of Mount Vision. Pool Brook flows into Otego Creek northeast of Laurens. Lake Brook begins in an unnamed field northwest of the Village of Laurens and flows south before flowing into Lake of the Twin Fawns. It then exits the lake and flows southeast before flowing into Gilbert Lake. After exiting Gilbert Lake it continues flowing southeast before converging with Otego Creek east of Laurens. Wharton Creek flows into Otego Creek south of Laurens. Harrison Creek flows into Otego Creek northeast of West Oneonta. Cooper Creek is a tributary of Harrison Creek that flows into Harrison Creek north-northwest of West Oneonta. Rouggly Creek flows through Hell Hollow and flows into Otego Creek southeast of West Oneonta.

== See also ==
- List of rivers of New York
