= Gifford Hill (Otsego County, New York) =

Small mountain chain in New York State

- Location within New York Location within the United States

Highest point
- Elevation: 1,928 feet (588 m)
- Coordinates: 42°31′09″N 75°02′21″W

Geography
- Location: Oneonta, New York, U.S.
- Topo map: USGS Mount Vision

Gifford Hill is a small mountain chain in the Central New York Region of New York. It is located northeast of Oneonta, New York. It is made of three main peaks the highest being 1928 feet. Gifford Hill is named for the Gifford Family who moved to the area in 1803 and settled along the Oneonta Creek on what is now called Gifford Hill.

The west side of Gifford Hill drains into Oneonta Creek and the east side of the hill drains into Gifford Creek.
