= Otego (village), New York =

Otego, New York
- Village
- Location within the state of New York
- Coordinates: 42°23′30″N 75°10′41″W
- Country: United States
- State: New York
- County: Otsego

Area
  - Total: 1.16 sq mi (3.00 km^{2})
  - Land: 1.16 sq mi (3.00 km^{2})
  - Water: 0 sq mi (0.00 km^{2})
- Elevation: 1,070 ft (326 m)

Population (2020)
  - Total: 875
  - Density: 754.7/sq mi (291.38/km^{2})
- Time zone: UTC-5 (Eastern (EST))
  - Summer (DST): UTC-4 (EDT)
- ZIP code: 13825
- Area code: 607
- FIPS code: 36-55618
- GNIS feature ID: 0959533

Otego is a village in Otsego County, New York, United States. It is located within the Mohawk Valley Region of the state. The population was 1,010 at the 2010 census.

As of 2024, the Otego town has a population of 2,669.

The Village of Otego is in the southern part of the Town of Otego and is southwest of Oneonta.

== History ==
There was no significant European settlement in the area until after the American Revolution.

== Geography ==
Otego is located at 42°23′30″N 75°10′40″W (42.391684, -75.17802).

According to the United States Census Bureau, the village has a total area of 1.1 square miles (3.0 km^{2}), all land.

The village is north of Interstate 88 and the Susquehanna River. The village is located on NY Route 7. County Highway 7 (Otsdawa Avenue) enters the village from the north.

== Demographics ==
Historical population
Census	Pop.	Note	%±
1880	749		—
1900	658		—
1910	676		2.7%
1920	540		−20.1%
1930	555		2.8%
1940	580		4.5%
1950	699		20.5%
1960	875		25.2%
1970	956		9.3%
1980	1,089		13.9%
1990	1,068		−1.9%
2000	1,052		−1.5%
2010	1,010		−4.0%
2020	875		−13.4%
U.S. Decennial Census

As of the census of 2000, there were 1,052 people, 386 households, and 265 families residing in the village. The population density was 917.3 inhabitants per square mile (354.2/km^{2}). There were 427 housing units at an average density of 372.3 per square mile (143.7/km^{2}). The racial makeup of the village was 96.20% White, 2.09% Black or African American, 0.19% Native American, 0.19% Asian, 0.38% from other races, and 0.95% from two or more races. Hispanic or Latino of any race were 2.00% of the population.

There were 386 households, out of which 35.8% had children under the age of 18 living with them, 55.2% were married couples living together, 10.1% had a female householder with no husband present, and 31.1% were non-families. 25.4% of all households were made up of individuals, and 12.4% had someone living alone who was 65 years of age or older. The average household size was 2.59 and the average family size was 3.09.

In the village, the population was spread out, with 28.9% under the age of 18, 6.3% from 18 to 24, 26.4% from 25 to 44, 24.3% from 45 to 64, and 14.1% who were 65 years of age or older. The median age was 38 years. For every 100 females, there were 86.9 males. For every 100 females age 18 and over, there were 79.8 males.

The median income for a household in the village was $40,000, and the median income for a family was $47,321. Males had a median income of $32,250 versus $26,875 for females. The per capita income for the village was $17,624. About 6.0% of families and 11.6% of the population were below the poverty line, including 8.3% of those under age 18 and 9.8% of those age 65 or over.
