= Edmeston =

Edmeston can refer to:

== People ==
- William Edmeston (18th century), British officer in French and Indian War, brother of Robert
- Robert Edmeston (18th century), British officer in French and Indian War, brother of William
- James Edmeston (1791–1867), English architect, surveyor, and hymn writer
- Newton Edmeston (20th century), Mayor of Fort William, Ontario 1922–1925

== Places ==
- Edmeston, New York, town in Otsego County, New York, USA
  - Edmeston (CDP), New York, community in the town of Edmeston
  - West Edmeston, New York, community in the town of Edmeston
  - South Edmeston, New York, community in the town of Edmeston

== Companies ==
- Edmeston AB, Swedish engineering company belonging to the Sandvik Group
