= Percifer Carr =

Percifer Carr (also given variously as Parsifer, Persifor, Persefer and Persafor Carr) (died 1804) was a British allied Loyalist living in what is now Otsego County, New York around the time of the American Revolution.

Carr served as a sergeant with Colonel William Edmeston in the French and Indian War, and was later employed as an agent for Edmeston and his brother Robert in establishing claims on tracts of land on the eastern bank of the Unadilla River just west of George Croghan's Otsego patent near what is now the hamlet of South Edmeston in the Town of Edmeston. Carr was then made caretaker for these tracts, which became known as Mount Edmeston (also known as Edmeston Plantation, Edmeston Manor, Carr's Garden, and commonly the Carr farm). The Edmeston brothers returned to England, but sent a number of settlers, likely including some Irish indentured servants, back to their estate. In 1773, William returned to Mount Edmeston to personally supervise its development, and by 1775, its population was nearing 100.

With the advent of the Revolutionary War, Edmeston, now a British major, was detained by American patriots in the eastern part of the state and Carr continued to manage Mount Edmeston. However, as a known Tory, he was suspected by patriots at Cherry Valley and German Flatts of selling provisions to Joseph Brant. In September 1778, a group of Native Americans who were allied with the British mistakenly set Carr's house on fire and carried him and his wife to Canada through the Niagara region. At least one account has stated that Carr was treated very poorly, having been forced to lie down in streams to allow his captors to use his body as a footbridge.

Carr and his wife returned to Mount Edmeston in 1783. Major Edmeston, who had returned to duty in Europe, hired Carr to rebuild his estate, but in 1788, Robert Edmeston returned to America and fired Carr. John Tunnicliff, an influential farmer in the area, tried to mediate the dispute, but, as Tunnicliff reported in a letter to William Cooper, his efforts proved fruitless, even though Carr's friends and neighbors signed an affidavit testifying to his "frugal & industrious" dealings on behalf of his landlord. Carr's direct appeal for relief to William Edmeston, on the grounds of old age and a "State of absolute Penury", was equally without success. Finally, however, a small piece of property was secured for him, and Carr remained in Otsego County until his death in 1804, when he was buried on John Tunnicliff's farm near Schuyler Lake.
