= Wharton Creek =

Wharton Creek may refer to:

- Wharton Creek (Arkansas), a stream in Arkansas
- Wharton Creek (Otego Creek tributary), a stream in New York
- Wharton Creek (Unadilla River tributary), a stream in New York
