= Edmeston Local =

Newspaper

The Edmeston Local
- Format: Weekly newspaper
- Founded: 1882
- Ceased publication: 1943
- OCLC number: 24451552

The Edmeston Local is a defunct newspaper from Edmeston, New York that was printed between 1882 and 1943.

In 1882, the first newspaper in the region was established by Mr. Elba S. Talbot, together with his brother Clarence, as a weekly named Wharton Valley Echo (OCLC 24048184), published from Burlington Flats every Saturday. On April 12, 1884, the publishers announced that the paper had been moved to Edmeston. It went on to be renamed The Edmeston Echo sometime around 1885 (OCLC 24486273) and in 1888 it assumed the name Edmeston Local.

During the 1940s, the paper left Edmeston to be published in Gilbertsville, resulting in its demise and in 1943 the publisher sold it to the New Berlin Gazette.
