= Burlington, New York =

- Town
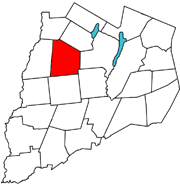
- Burlington, Otsego County, New York
- Coordinates: 42°43′42″N 75°8′29″W
- Country: United States
- State: New York
- County: Otsego

Area
  - Total: 45.01 sq mi (116.58 km^{2})
  - Land: 44.89 sq mi (116.27 km^{2})
  - Water: 0.12 sq mi (0.32 km^{2})
- Elevation: 1,959 ft (597 m)

Population (2010)
  - Total: 1,140
  - Estimate (2016): 1,084
  - Density: 24.1/sq mi (9.32/km^{2})
- Time zone: UTC-5 (Eastern (EST))
  - Summer (DST): UTC-4 (EDT)
- ZIP code: 13315
- Area code: 607
- FIPS code: 36-11209
- GNIS feature ID: 0978766
- Website: townofburlingtonny.com

Burlington is a town in Otsego County, New York, United States. The population was 1,140 at the 2010 census.

The Town of Burlington is in the northwestern part of the county and is located north of Oneonta.

== Geography ==
According to the United States Census Bureau, the town has a total area of 45.0 square miles (117 km^{2}), of which 45.0 square miles (117 km^{2}) is land and 0.1 square miles (0.26 km^{2}) (0.13%) is water. An 1878 history of the county states the acreage as 27,217, with an assessed valuation of $421,450 and equalized valuation of $473,576.

North-south highway New York State Route 51 and east-west highway New York State Route 80 intersect at Barrett Corners. North-south highway county route 16 and east-west highway New York State Route 80 intersect at Burlington Green.

Butternut Creek and Wharton Creek are important waterways in the town.

== History ==
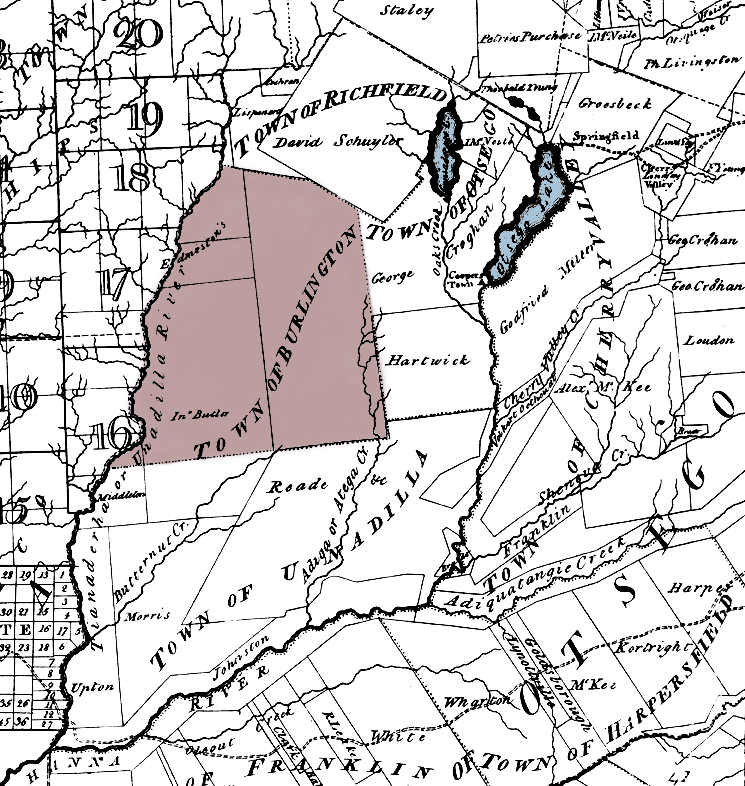
Town of Burlington, c.1792

Early settlers came from New England. Township named after Burlington, New Jersey by William Cooper and Andrew Craig, early land patent owners. At an early time the Butternut Creek was dubbed "Burlington Creek" as well but the name did not stick.

Burlington was formed from the Town of Otsego, April 10, 1792. It retained its original dimensions until 1797, when Pittsfield (and what would come to be New Lisbon) was set off. It was further diminished in area by the creation of Edmeston, in 1808.

The 1878 history describes the community of Burlington Green as having two churches, an inn that was a stage coach stop on the Cayuga Turnpike, a doctor, a general store, lawyer office, hotel, gristmill, creamery, cheese factory, two blacksmith shops, two wagon shops, a cooper and shoe shop and photography studio, but "This village at one time was a place of much more mercantile and manufacturing interest than at present, having a comb-factory, a hattery, two tanneries, an iron-foundry, a furniture-factory, three stores, two hotels, a cloth-dressing and wool carding-factory, and a card factory." The heavily textile based economy of the Butternut Valley was an influence in the number of sheep and immigrants that arrived from Scotland and established the United Presbyterian Church at Burlington Green June 8, 1835.

== Notable people ==
- Benjamin F. Angel, (1815–1894), born in Burlington, former ambassador of the United States
- William Hulbert (1832–1882), Born in Burlington Flats, President of the Chicago White Stockings baseball club and the National League and member of the Baseball Hall of Fame
- Jedediah Peck, a.k.a. "Ploughjogger", one of several Lyme. CT natives to pioneer in this town, Revolutionary War soldier, millwright, surveyor, essayist, first town supervisor and member NY State assembly, he promoted the establishment of public schools, and the abolishment of debtors' prison in NY state. Arguing in favor of rule by commoners rather than elitists he wrote: "The people can never mean to do anything that will not advance the public good, and it is only under momentary delusion that they can act wrong." Antagonist of Federalist everywhere he gathered petition signatures against the Alien and Sedition Acts, which led to his arrest by Judge Cooper and transport in open wagon in the fall of 1799, to New York City for trial. It is claimed sympathy at the sight of him convinced the weight of the New York electoral votes to be cast in favor of Thomas Jefferson. Today there are several state historical markers for Peck, one at his grave on route 80 east of Burlington Green, and two on route 20 in Richfield, commemorating his work as a millwright.
- Parley P. Pratt (1807–1857), born in Burlington, was an early leader of the Latter Day Saint movement whose writings became a significant early nineteenth-century exposition of the Latter Day Saint faith.
- Daniel H. Richards (1808–1877), Wisconsin legislator and newspaper editor, was born in Burlington.
- Anna Peck Sill (1816-1889), educator; founder of Rockford Female Seminary
- George Eaton Sutherland (1847–1899), Wisconsin legislator and judge

== Demographics ==
Historical population
Census	Pop.	Note	%±
1820	2,457		—
1830	2,459		0.1%
1840	2,154		−12.4%
1850	1,835		−14.8%
1860	1,818		−0.9%
1870	1,476		−18.8%
1880	1,599		8.3%
1890	1,334		−16.6%
1900	1,263		−5.3%
1910	1,108		−12.3%
1920	999		−9.8%
1930	913		−8.6%
1940	956		4.7%
1950	959		0.3%
1960	809		−15.6%
1970	803		−0.7%
1980	1,045		30.1%
1990	1,036		−0.9%
2000	1,085		4.7%
2010	1,140		5.1%
2016 (est.)	1,084		−4.9%
U.S. Decennial Census

As of the census of 2000, there were 1,085 people, 392 households, and 301 families residing in the town. The population density was 24.1 inhabitants per square mile (9.3/km^{2}). There were 500 housing units at an average density of 11.1 per square mile (4.3/km^{2}). The racial makeup of the town was 97.14% White, 0.18% African American, 0.18% Native American, 0.28% Asian, 0.37% from other races, and 1.84% from two or more races. Hispanic or Latino of any race were 1.66% of the population.

There were 392 households, out of which 36.2% had children under the age of 18 living with them, 65.1% were married couples living together, 7.9% had a female householder with no husband present, and 23.2% were non-families. 18.6% of all households were made up of individuals, and 8.2% had someone living alone who was 65 years of age or older. The average household size was 2.76 and the average family size was 3.08.

In the town, the population was spread out, with 26.5% under the age of 18, 7.7% from 18 to 24, 29.3% from 25 to 44, 22.6% from 45 to 64, and 13.9% who were 65 years of age or older. The median age was 38 years. For every 100 females, there were 103.6 males. For every 100 females age 18 and over, there were 94.6 males.

The median income for a household in the town was $36,823, and the median income for a family was $42,500. Males had a median income of $28,000 versus $20,667 for females. The per capita income for the town was $15,184. About 7.4% of families and 11.8% of the population were below the poverty line, including 11.5% of those under age 18 and 17.1% of those age 65 or over.

== Communities and locations in the Town of Burlington ==
- Barrett Corners – A hamlet south of Burlington Flats on NY-51 at its intersection with NY-80.
- Basswood Pond – Artificial lake on headwaters of the Butternut Creek built by NYS about 1961 as a day use area west of county route 16 in the north part of town. Inside Basswood Pond State Park.
- Beverly Inn Corners – A hamlet north of Burlington Flats on NY-51.
- Briar Hill – An elevation located east or Burlington.
- Burlington Flats – A hamlet in the western part of the town located on route NY-51. Originally called "Walbridge Flats".
- Burlington – The hamlet of Burlington is located on NY-80. Unofficially it is still called by its original name "Burlington Green" or simply "The Green".
- Chapinville – A hamlet south of Burlington Flats on NY-51.
- Cranberry Bog – Bog or valley in the southeast section of town on the headwaters of the Otego Creek.
- Gardner Pond – A small pond located south-southwest of West Burlington.
- Klock Hill – An elevation southwest of Burlington.
- Methodist Hollow – A location near the southern town line.
- Patent – A hamlet near the southeastern corner of town.
- Pecktown – A hamlet near the northern town line. Formally referred to as Wharton.
- Pigeon Hill – An elevation in the northeastern corner of the town. Partially in the Town of Exeter.
- Rice Hill – An elevation east of West Burlington.
- Round Top – A hill north of NY-80.
- West Burlington – A hamlet near the western town line on conjoined routes NY-51 and NY-80.
- Wharton – A historic location in the northwestern part of the town.
- Wharton Creek – A stream flowing through the western part of the town.
