= Klock Hill =

Mountain in New York, United States

- Location within New York Location within the United States

Highest point
- Elevation: 2,021 feet (616 m)
- Coordinates: 42°43′05″N 75°08′39″W

Geography
- Location: Burlington, New York, U.S.
- Topo map: USGS Edmeston

Klock Hill is a mountain located in Central New York region of New York southwest of Burlington, New York.

Once claimed as the highest point in Otsego County, a century ago they even had a wooden observation tower built for tourists and were locked in bitter debate with folks in Maryland that claimed Hooker Mountain was tallest. Actually named for a resident whose name was "Klock".
