= Pittsfield, New York =

- Town
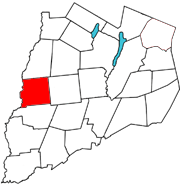
- Otsego County map with the Town of Pittsfield in red
- Coordinates: 42°38′N 75°16′W
- Country: United States
- State: New York
- County: Otsego

Area
  - Total: 38.09 sq mi (98.66 km^{2})
  - Land: 37.98 sq mi (98.36 km^{2})
  - Water: 0.12 sq mi (0.30 km^{2})
- Elevation: 1,752 ft (534 m)

Population (2010)
  - Total: 1,366
  - Estimate (2016): 1,300
  - Density: 34.2/sq mi (13.22/km^{2})
- Time zone: UTC-5 (Eastern (EST))
  - Summer (DST): UTC-4 (EDT)
- FIPS code: 36-58343
- GNIS feature ID: 0979371
- Website: www.pittsfieldny.com

Pittsfield is a town in Otsego County, New York, United States. The population was 1,366 at the 2010 census.

The Town of Pittsfield is on the western border of the county, northwest of the City of Oneonta.

== History ==
The town was first settled circa 1793.

The Town of Pittsfield was formed from part of the Town of Burlington in 1797. Its territory was reduced twice, in 1806 to form the Town of New Lisbon, and in 1859 to form part of the Town of Morris. The Noble family from Pittsfield, Massachusetts, named it for their old home, which they settled in the Pittsfield Centre vicinity.

The hamlet of Pittsfield, or "Pittsfield Centre," had an unmanned whistle stop station and siding on the Ontario & Western RR branch to Edmeston from New Berlin, which the Unadilla Valley RR later purchased. During World War I, Richard Freeman and Charles Walton shipped lumber by the carload from here, milled over in Ketchum.

Ketchum takes its name from the Rev. Orvib Ketchum, who founded a congregational church on the headwaters of Aldrich Creek in the eastern part of town. The Wyoming Conference later sold the church to the Americana Village near Hamilton, NY. A schoolhouse, a store, several steam sawmills, and a cemetery also existed here. The Ball family operated several "rope walks" nearby, winding hemp into twine and then rope.

Locals refer to County Route 13 between Morris and New Berlin as "the turnpike." Originally constructed in 1832, it was the last section to operate a tollgate because it was the most expensive to build.

Ebenezer Chapel, near the southwest border, was coincidentally named after a nearby resident and was a small settlement known initially as "Hayti" at one time. In 1956, a nearby house made statewide news when a moonshine still was broken up.

The Beardslee Farm was listed on the National Register of Historic Places in 2000.

== Geography ==
According to the United States Census Bureau, the town has a total area of 37.8 square miles (98 km^{2}), of which 37.7 square miles (98 km^{2}) is land and 0.1 square miles (0.26 km^{2}) (0.13%) is water.

The western town line, defined by the Unadilla River, is the border of Chenango County. Wharton Creek flows into the Unadilla River at the western town line. Aldrich Creek drains the east end of town southwards into the Butternut at Elm Grove in Morris.

New York State Route 80 passes through the northwestern part of the town.

== Demographics ==
Historical population
Census	Pop.	Note	%±
1820	839		—
1830	1,005		19.8%
1840	1,395		38.8%
1850	1,591		14.1%
1860	1,480		−7.0%
1870	1,469		−0.7%
1880	1,450		−1.3%
1890	1,218		−16.0%
1900	1,101		−9.6%
1910	917		−16.7%
1920	813		−11.3%
1930	727		−10.6%
1940	796		9.5%
1950	850		6.8%
1960	880		3.5%
1970	968		10.0%
1980	1,067		10.2%
1990	1,116		4.6%
2000	1,295		16.0%
2010	1,366		5.5%
2016 (est.)	1,300		−4.8%
U.S. Decennial Census

As of the 2000 census, there were 1,295 people, 474 households, and 359 families residing in the town. The population density was 34.3 inhabitants per square mile (13.2/km^{2}). There were 605 housing units at an average density of 16.0 per square mile (6.2/km^{2}). The town's racial makeup was 98.84% White, 0.23% African American, 0.15% Native American, 0.23% Asian, 0.08% from other races, and 0.46% from two or more races. Hispanic or Latino people of any race were 0.69% of the population.

There were 474 households, out of which 36.5% had children under 18 living with them, 63.3% were married couples living together, 7.2% had a female householder with no husband present, and 24.1% were non-families. 19.2% of all households comprised individuals, and 9.1% had someone 65 or older living alone. The average household size was 2.73, and the average family size was 3.03.

The town's population was spread out, with 27.3% under 18, 5.9% from 18 to 24, 28.3% from 25 to 44, 26.8% from 45 to 64, and 11.7% 65 or older. The median age was 38 years. For every 100 females, there were 104.6 males. For every 100 females age 18 and over, there were 104.6 males.

The median income for a household in the town was $30,078, and the median income for a family was $36,328. Males had a median income of $27,446 versus $21,912 for females. The per capita income for the town was $15,347. About 13.5% of families and 17.0% of the population were below the poverty line, including 20.9% of those under age 18 and 12.3% of those age 65 or over.

== Communities and locations in Pittsfield ==
- Briggs Corners – a location northwest of Pittsfield village
- Cardtown – a location northeast of Pittsfield village
- Finksville – about a mile east of New Berlin on the Turnpike/County 13, once home of a large woodenware and pump log manufactory
- Gill Hill – an elevation in the southeastern corner of the town.
- Hoboken – A hamlet near the western town line on NY-80; named for workers who migrated up from Hoboken, NJ, at the Bordens Condensory that was initially the Arkwright textile mill and c. 1900 was the largest dairy condensory in the world, just east of the Village of New Berlin and served by a branch of the O&WRR.
- Ketchum – a location in the western part of the town on County Route 49, formerly the site of a Congregational church founded by Rev. Orvib Ketchum, for whom the hamlet was named
- Pittsfield – The hamlet of Pittsfield, formerly "Pittsfield Centre," is on NY Route 80 in the northern part of the town.
- Silver Lake – a hamlet near the Unadilla River, south-southwest of Hoboken
- Silver Lake – A small lake of the same name is located east of the hamlet of Silver Lake.
- Shacktown Mountain – an elevation in the southwestern corner of Pittsfield
- Taylors Corners – a location northeast of Pittsfield village on County Route 49
