= Mill Creek (Wharton Creek tributary) =

Location
- Country: United States
- State: New York
- Region: Central New York
- County: Otsego

Physical characteristics
- Source
- Mouth: Wharton Creek
  - location: Hamlet of Edmeston
  - coordinates: 42°41′41″N 75°14′27″W

Mill Creek is a stream in the town of Edmeston, New York. It converges with Wharton Creek at the hamlet of Edmeston.
