= Beardslee Farm =

- U.S. National Register of Historic Places
- U.S. Historic district
- Location within New York Location within the United States
- Nearest city: Pittsfield, New York
- Coordinates: 42°37′34″N 75°19′14″W
- Area: 256 acres (104 ha)
- Built: 1799
- Architectural style: Early Republic, Mid 19th Century Revival
- NRHP reference No.: 00000748
- Added to NRHP: June 30, 2000

Beardslee Farm is a national historic district and farmstead located at Pittsfield in Otsego County, New York. It encompasses five contributing buildings, one contributing site, and one contributing structure. It consists of the farmhouse, dependencies, and a small family cemetery. The L-shaped farmhouse is a large sprawling wood frame residence comprising three sections that reflects three separate building campaigns, c. 1790, c. 1800, and c. 1810. The main section is a two-story, five-bay building with a center entrance and a gable roof. Also on the property is a horse barn, carriage house, corn house, hop barn, and pump house.

It was listed on the National Register of Historic Places in 2000.
