= Hamdi Ulukaya =

Turkish businessman of Kurdish ethnicity (born 1972)

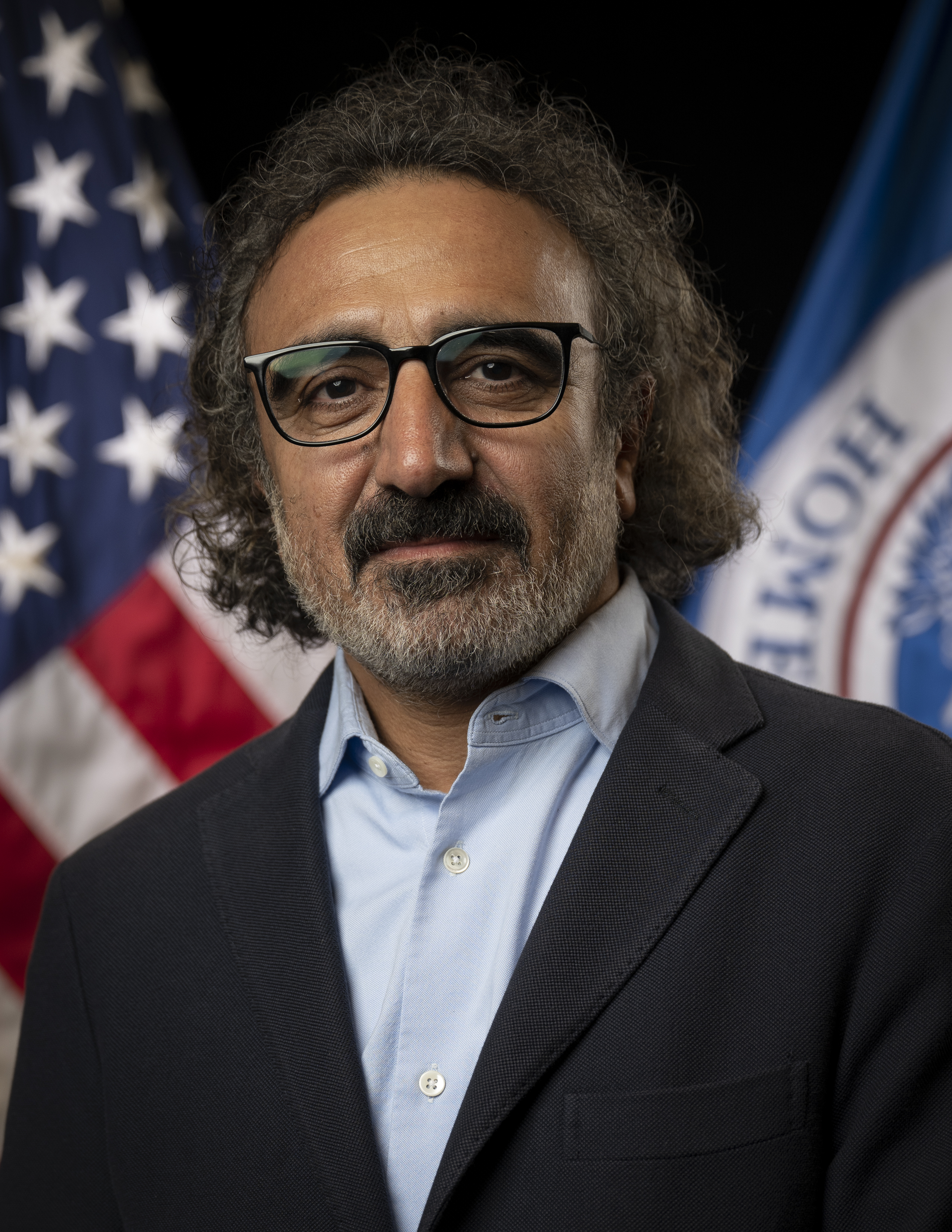
- Ulukaya in 2022
- Born: 26 October 1972 (age 54); İliç, Erzincan, Turkey
- Education: Ankara University; University at Albany
- Occupations: Founder & CEO of Chobani
- Spouses: Ayşe Giray (m. 1997–1999) Louise Vongerichten (m. 2018)
- Children: 3

Hamdi Ulukaya (born 26 October 1972) is a Turkish billionaire businessperson, activist and philanthropist of Kurdish ethnicity based in the United States. He is the founder, owner, chair, and CEO of the strained yogurt brand Chobani. He is among the 300 richest people in the world, with a fortune of $13.7B, as of April 2026.

Ulukaya, a Kurd, has stated his strong commitment to Kurdish rights, citing this as a reason for leaving Turkey due to the Turkish state's oppression of its Kurdish minority. He started a modest feta cheese factory in 2002 on his father's advice. His major success came when he purchased a large, defunct yogurt factory in upstate New York in 2005, located in a region with a history in the dairy and cheese industry since the mid-nineteenth century. Chobani achieved over $1 billion in annual sales in less than five years after its launch, becoming a leading yogurt brand in the U.S. by 2011. Ulukaya was named the Ernst & Young World Entrepreneur Of The Year in 2013, and Inc. magazine named him as "one of the most important entrepreneurs of the past decade" in 2019. In July 2022, UN Secretary General António Guterres appointed him as an additional advocate for the Sustainable Development Goals of the United Nations.

== Early life and education ==
Hamdi Ulukaya was born in 1972, to a Kurdish dairy-farming family in İliç, a small village in Turkey's Erzincan. He had six siblings and his family owned and operated a sheep, goat, and dairy farm near the Euphrates River in İliç, Erzincan, where they made cheese and yogurt. The family often led a seasonally semi-nomadic existence tending and herding their flocks. Ulukaya is uncertain of his exact birth date because he was born during one of the family's mountain treks, although he uses 26 October as his birthday.

While studying political science at the School of Political Science, Ankara University, Ulukaya became involved in the Kurdish-rights movement, attending demonstrations and publishing a newspaper that criticized the Turkish state's treatment of Kurds, which drew the attention of authorities. In 1994, citing a desire to escape Turkey's mistreatment of its Kurdish minority as well as to further his education, Ulukaya moved to the United States to study English at Adelphi University on Long Island, New York. In 1997, he moved upstate and transferred to the University at Albany, State University of New York where he enrolled in a few business courses.

He ended up taking a job on an upstate farm. During a visit, his father persuaded Ulukaya to import the family's feta cheese from Turkey, after tasting what he perceived to be inferior cheese available locally. When the imported cheese proved popular, Ulukaya opened a small wholesale feta cheese plant of his own, called Euphrates, in Johnstown, New York in 2002. The venture was modestly successful but by the two-year mark it had just barely broken even. Ulukaya later recalled, "It was two years of the most challenging days of my life."

== Business ventures ==
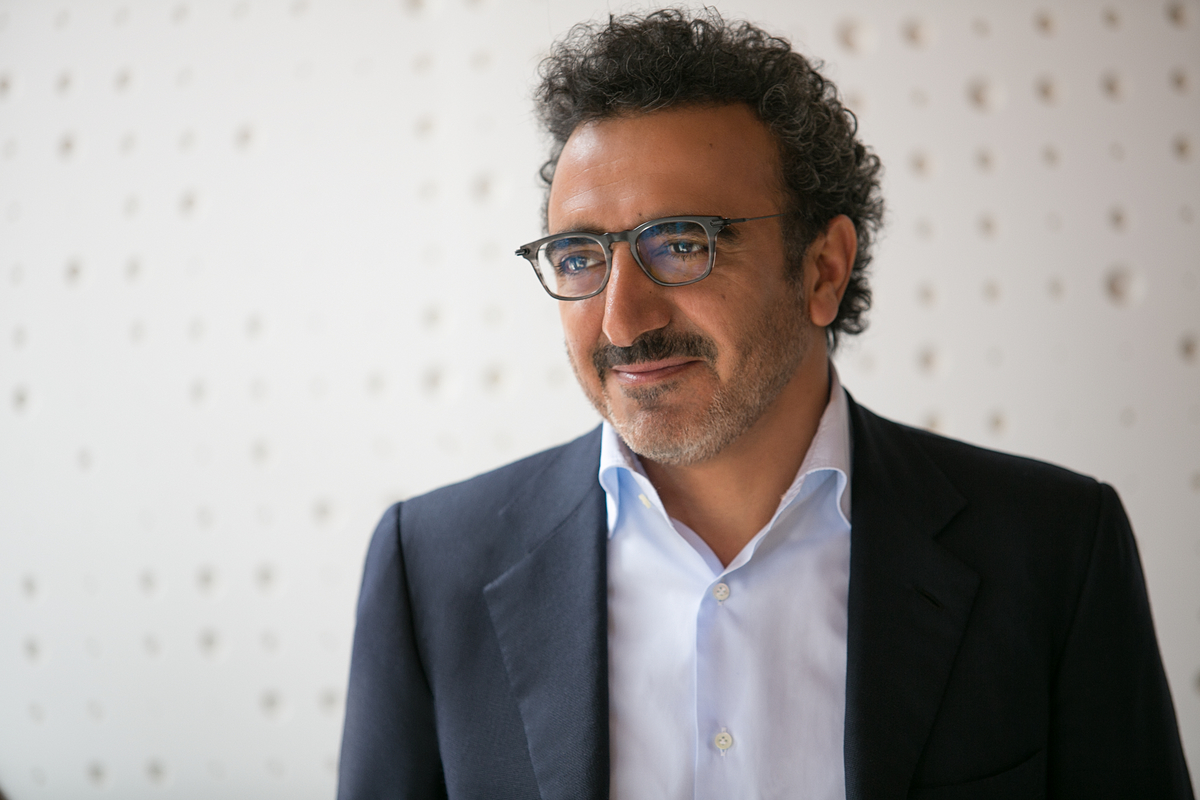
Ulukaya in 2015

=== Inception and development ===
In the spring of 2005, Ulukaya noticed a piece of junk mail advertising a fully equipped yogurt factory for sale in South Edmeston, New York, 65 miles (105 km) west of his feta cheese factory. The 84-year-old factory had been closed by Kraft Foods. Although he initially threw the flier away, Ulukaya toured the plant the following day and decided to buy it, against the advice of his attorney and business advisor. Ulukaya financed the purchase within five months with a loan from the Small Business Administration, plus local business-incentive grants. He initially named his new company Agro Farma, and hired a handful of the former Kraft employees.

Ulukaya decided to make an alternative to American-style yogurt, preferring the yogurt he grew up with in Turkey. He hired a yogurt master from Turkey, Mustafa Dogan, with whom he spent nearly two years developing his own yogurt recipe. To manufacture strained yogurt, Ulukaya needed a million-dollar commercial machine called a milk separator, which the American-style Kraft factory did not have. He found a used one in Wisconsin and negotiated to buy it for $50,000. On his trip to pick up the separator, the name "Chobani", a variation of çoban, the Turkish word for shepherd occurred to him.

Ulukaya made Chobani yogurt without preservatives. Since he could not afford advertising, he invested time and money on the product's packaging, using a distinctive new bowl-style shape to differentiate the brand.

=== Launch ===
In October 2007, he shipped his first order of Chobani, a few hundred cases, to a grocer on Long Island. The store repeated the order the following week.

Ulukaya's early business approach included strategies larger companies did not use. Rather than pay stores a slotting fee, which his start-up company could not afford, he paid stores in yogurt rather than in cash to stock his wares. He also negotiated to pay off the slotting fees over time as the yogurt sold. He also implemented in-store samples so customers could taste the product and purchase it immediately. Lacking the budget for traditional marketing, after hearing customers phoning in to say that they loved Chobani, Ulukaya had his small team reach out to bloggers, Facebook, and Twitter to have constant and direct communication with consumers. In 2010 he also created a sampling truck, the CHOmobile, which handed out free cups of Chobani yogurt at festivals, parades, and other family-friendly events all over the U.S. In its first year, the sample truck gave away 150,000 full-size containers of Chobani.

=== Expansion ===
After BJ's and Costco began carrying Chobani in 2009, the company doubled its sales every year through 2013. In December 2012 the company opened the world's largest yogurt factory in Twin Falls, Idaho, a $450 million investment. Two additional milestones occurred in 2012: Chobani had more than $1 billion in annual sales, and it became the world's leading yogurt brand.

By 2017, Chobani reached a US market share of Greek yogurt of over 50%. Chobani expanded internationally to Australia in 2011, into Mexico in 2016, and by 2021, it exported its products to China, Malaysia and Thailand.

On 26 April 2016, Ulukaya announced to his employees that he would be giving them 10% of the shares in Chobani.

=== La Colombe Coffee Roasters ===
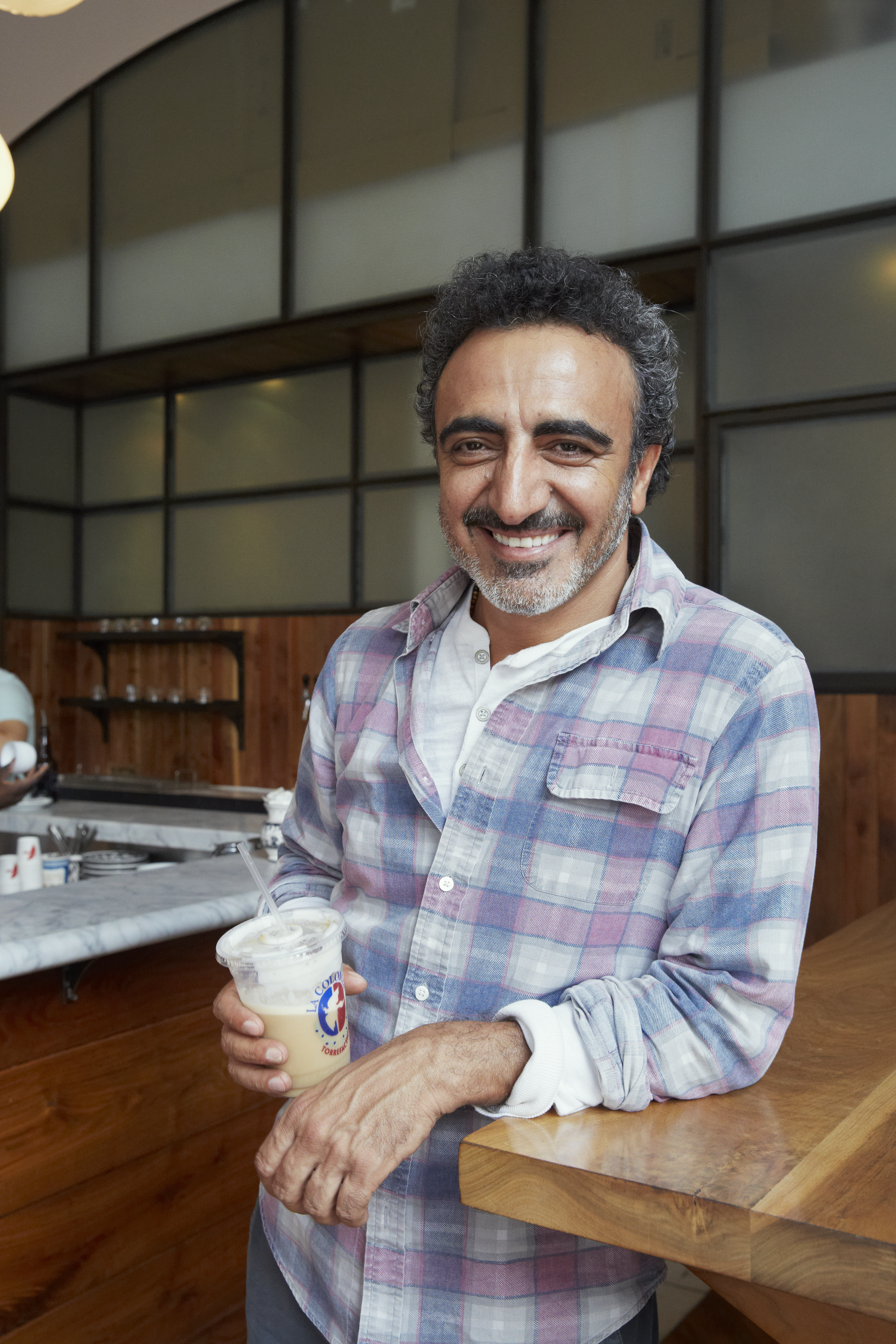
Hamdi Ulukaya drinking La Colombe coffee

In mid-2015 Ulukaya became the majority investor in La Colombe Coffee Roasters.

=== Anchor Brewing ===
On May 31, 2024 it was announced that Hamdi Ulukaya was purchasing Anchor Brewing and was planning to re-open its operations. He acquired this brewery in June 2023 separate from Chobani.

== Business philosophy ==
Ulukaya has stated that higher wages for employees leads to greater corporate success.

In an interview with Ernst and Young Global chairman & CEO Mark Weinberger, Ulukaya said that businessmen should promote a sense of purpose in their corporate culture to create a climate of positive change in business and the world. He stated that companies should focus on humanity and not just on their bottom lines.

When Ulukaya opened his second yogurt manufacturing plant in Twin Falls, Idaho, he created a job training program together with the College of Southern Idaho and the Chobani Foundation (formerly known as Shepherd's Gift Foundation.) He has also worked to improve the community in Twin Falls by supporting the Southern Idaho Children's Learning Center, Twin Falls Rapids Soccer Club, and other community programs.

In March 2017 The New York Times reported Ulukaya's efforts to work with Idaho colleges to offer technical training for workers to solve the area's labor shortage. The Chobani yogurt plant in Twin Falls is the largest in the world and pays its workers in the area on average twice minimum wage. Additionally, he raised the starting wage to $15 per hour as of spring 2021.

In the fall of 2017, Chobani announced a brand evolution that featured new packaging and positioned the company as a "food-focused wellness company".

In 2017, Chobani started offering six weeks of paid leave to new parents as a result of Ulukaya's own experience when his son was born in 2015. The policy ensures that Chobani employees have the needed time to bond with their newborns, and it covers adoption, foster care and same-sex couples as well. In 2025 the paid leave offered by this policy was extended to 12 weeks.

In March 2017, Ulukaya was featured on the cover of Fast Company magazine. The cover story was titled "How Chobani's Hamdi Ulukaya Is Winning America's Culture War". Later that spring, Ulukaya was featured by CBSNews' 60 Minutes on 9 April 2017, in a segment called "Chief of Chobani" that focused on his approach to business and philanthropy.

In the spring of 2018, Ulukaya appeared on The Ellen DeGeneres Show and Good Morning America to announce that the company was celebrating its 10th anniversary as a national brand by giving a Chobani yogurt to every person in America.

In April 2019, Ulukaya gave a TED Talk on the TED conference main stage in Vancouver, entitled "The anti-CEO playbook".

In June 2019, Ulukaya launched Milk Matters, a program to support the future of dairy farming in America. Part of the program includes a new collaboration with Fair Trade USA to explore developing the first standard and certification program of the dairy industry.

In the wake of growing food prices, Ulukaya criticized food makers for passing on rising costs to their consumers. Ulukaya criticized companies for chasing profits and stated that they need to focus on social responsibility. Ulukaya stated that businesses were more than happy to raise prices during inflation but slow to bring them back down when costs drop. Ulukaya has been committed to making affordable and nutritious foods using only natural ingredients.

== Philanthropy ==
From establishing Chobani, Ulukaya has given 10% of his company's net profits to charitable causes. In 2010 he established the company's charitable arm, the Chobani Shepherd's Gift Foundation, now called the Chobani Foundation, to manage this philanthropy. Donations have included major grants to support famine relief efforts in Somalia, and to underwrite the New York City Pianos project launched by Sing for Hope.

Ulukaya pledged to donate most of his wealth, at the time of the pledge at least 700 million dollars, to help the Kurdish refugees, as well as refugees from all around the world.

In 2014 Ulukaya pledged to donate $2 million to the United Nations High Commissioner for Refugees. He has also donated to many Muslim charities associated with Iraq and Syria and has explored philanthropic avenues for helping refugees around the world. He signed up for The Giving Pledge, a philanthropic initiative by Warren Buffett and Bill Gates.

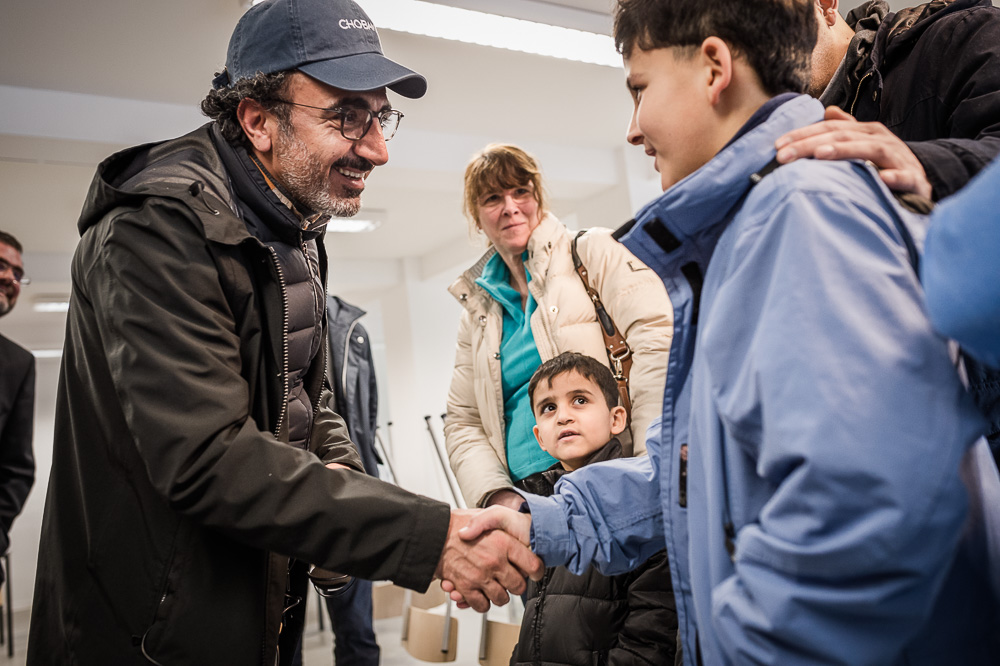
Hamdi Ulukaya meeting refugees

Ulukaya visited the Greek island of Lesbos in September 2015 to see first-hand the situation of the mostly Syrian refugees there. In 2015 he launched the Tent Foundation to help refugees. At Chobani's plants in Upstate New York and Idaho, Ulukaya has long hired refugees from around the world from regions across Asia, Africa and the Middle East.

In 2015, Ulukaya attended the World Economic Forum in Davos, Switzerland, and launched several new initiatives to help refugees while also encouraging world and business leaders to do more.

In 2016, Ulukaya was invited to join the Special Olympics International Board of Directors. He is part of the volunteer Board of Directors which determines international policy along with other business leaders, sport leaders, professional athletes, educators and others.

In July 2017, Ulukaya launched the Hamdi Ulukaya Initiative (HUG) to train Turkish entrepreneurs who are running existing startups or planning on starting a new venture. HUG has a $5 million budget over five years.

In May 2019, it was reported that the Warwick school district in Rhode Island would be instituting a policy whereby students who had outstanding school lunch debt would only be served sunflower seed butter and jelly sandwiches, causing an uproar that they were essentially "school lunch shaming" students who had delinquent accounts, aside from denying them nutritionally balanced lunches. Many of these families were struggling and this was harmful to the students on many levels. Ulukaya stepped in and paid the US$77,000 to cover all the students' outstanding school lunch debt.

In 2023, Ulukaya pledged to donate $2 million to relief efforts for the 2023 Turkey–Syria earthquake.

== Recognition ==
In April 2014 he was named by President Barack Obama as an inaugural member of the Presidential Ambassadors for Global Entrepreneurship (PAGE) initiative – 11 selected business leaders who will encourage entrepreneurship in the U.S. and abroad.

Ulukaya was a member of the Upstate Regional Advisory Board of the Federal Reserve Bank of New York, and previously was vice chair of the corporate fund board of the Kennedy Center for the Performing Arts. He is on the board of the Pathfinder Village (Community for Down Syndrome) Foundation in Edmeston, New York.

Since 2023, Ulukaya has served as the chair of the U.S.-Türkiye Business Council, operating under the U.S. Chamber of Commerce.

== Honors ==
- Fulton County Economic Development Corp.'s Outstanding Business Award 2008
- The Business Review's 40 Under Forty Award of 2009
- American Advertising Federation's Advertising Hall of Achievement (inducted 2011)
- Small Business Administration's 2012 Entrepreneurial Success of the Year Award
- Ernst & Young U.S. Entrepreneur of the Year 2012
- Tribeca Disruptive Innovation Awards (2013)
- Ernst & Young World Entrepreneur of the Year 2013
- Brand Genius Award from Adweek in 2013, in the Consumer Packaged Goods category
- Sing for Hope honoree at 2013 Art for All Gala
- Honorary Ph.D. in Humane Letters from Colgate University (2013)
- Honorary Ph.D. in Humane Letters from the Sage Colleges (2013)
- Honorary Ph.D. in Humane Letters from the University at Albany (2014)
- Culinary Institute of America Leadership Award for Health and Wellness (2014)
- Presidential Ambassador for Global Entrepreneurship (2014)
- 2015 UN Global Leadership Award
- In November 2015, Ulukaya was honored by the Children's Aid Society with their Corporate Leadership Award.
- In October 2015, Ulukaya was honored with a humanitarian award by the American Turkish Society (ATS) for his personal work in helping to relieve the suffering of Syrian refugees.
- 2016 Eminent Advocate honor from the UNHCR
- 2016 Women's Refugee Committee Voices of Courage Corporate Leadership Award
- 2016, Disruptor Awards' Christensen Prize. He was a 2013 honoree for the same award.
- Named one of Time magazine's 100 Most Influential People in the World in 2017
- Featured on the cover of Fast Company in 2017 as a model for 21st century leadership
- Featured in Fortune magazine's third annual list of 50 companies that are changing the world in 2017
- Selected by Forbes as one of the 100 greatest business minds as part of the Forbes' centennial celebration
- Included in Fast Company's list of the 50 Most Innovative Companies in 2017
- Save the Children's Humanitarian Award (2017)
- Named one of Foreign Policy magazine's Global Thinkers (2017)
- Robert F. Kennedy Human Rights' Ripple of Hope Award (2017)
- Named one of the National Retail Federations' People Shaping Retail's Future (2018)
- Accepted Chobani's Salute to Greatness Award by The Martin Luther King Jr. Center for Nonviolent Social Change (2018)
- Refugees International's McCall-Pierpaoli Humanitarian Award (2018)
- Honorary Ph.D. in Humane Letters from the University of Pennsylvania (2018)
- Honored by Lycée Français de New York with the Charles de Ferry de Fontnouvelle Award (2019)
- Honorary Ph.D. in Humane Letters from Boise State University (2019)
- Honorary Ph.D. in Humane Letters from Southern Methodist University (2019)
- Recipient of the Oslo Business for Peace Award from the Business for Peace Foundation (2019)
- Anti-Defamation League's Courage Against Hate Award (2019)
- Global Citizen Prize for Business Leader (2019)
- Honorary Ph.D. in Global Entrepreneurship from Northeastern University (2022)

== Personal life ==
Ulukaya lives in New Berlin, New York, near Chobani's South Edmeston factory and headquarters. He was briefly married in the late 1990s to New York City doctor Ayşe Giray. In 2012, Hamdi Ulukaya's Turkish ex-wife Dr. Ayşe Giray sued him for a 53 percent stake in the company claiming her family lent him $500,000 for the business. The suit was settled for an undisclosed amount. Other claims that emerged from the divorce proceedings included her accusations that Hamdi stole the recipe for his yogurts. These accusations were proven unfounded and dropped. Ulukaya joined the world's billionaires in the early 2010s.

In 2015, he had a son, Aga, with Alida Boer. In January 2018, Ulukaya married Louise Vongerichten, co-founder and president of Food Dreams Foundation, founder of sustainable's kids clothing line Mon Coeur and daughter of French-American chef Jean-Georges Vongerichten.

Ulukaya has additional offices in Manhattan and Twin Falls, Idaho.

A die-hard Fenerbahçe fan and close friend of President Ali Koç, Ulukaya became the jersey and stadium name sponsor of the football A-team, paying club around 20 M Euros annually.
