= Silver Lake, Otsego County, New York =

Silver Lake, New York
- Hamlet
- Interactive map of Silver Lake, New York
- Coordinates: 42°36′05″N 75°19′57″W
- Country: United States
- State: New York
- County: Otsego
- Town: Pittsfield
- Elevation: 1,087 ft (331 m)
- Time zone: UTC-5 (Eastern (EST))
  - Summer (DST): UTC-4 (EDT)
- ZIP code: 14549
- Area code: 607

Silver Lake is a hamlet situated on a small lake of the same name in the Town of Pittsfield. It is located south of Village of New Berlin along the eastern bank of the Unadilla River.

Silver Lake, which is 30 acres (120,000 m^{2}), and the surrounding wetlands are privately owned. A former 1920s era race track surrounds the lake and has been turned into a nature sanctuary. The lake has mostly warm-water fish such as blue gill, and bass with abundance of birds, turtles, frogs, etc. Several lots along one-third of the lake have deeded access to the lake. There is also a small neighborhood beach maintained by the area's residents.
