= Tent Partnership for Refugees =

US-based non-profit organization

- Founder: Hamdi Ulukaya
- Founded at: New York
- Legal status: Non-profit organization
- Headquarters: New York City
- CEO: Gideon Maltz
- Website: www.tent.org

The Tent Partnership for Refugees, previously known as the Tent Foundation, is an international non-profit organization founded by Hamdi Ulukaya, the founder and CEO of Chobani. It is a coalition of hundreds of major businesses that have committed to take action to help refugees and was created to mobilize the business community to connect refugees to work.

Established in 2016 and headquartered in New York City, the organization brings together companies to help refugees find jobs. Led today by Gideon Maltz , the Tent Partnership for Refugees works directly with the businesses in its network on their efforts to hire, train, and mentor refugees.

== History ==
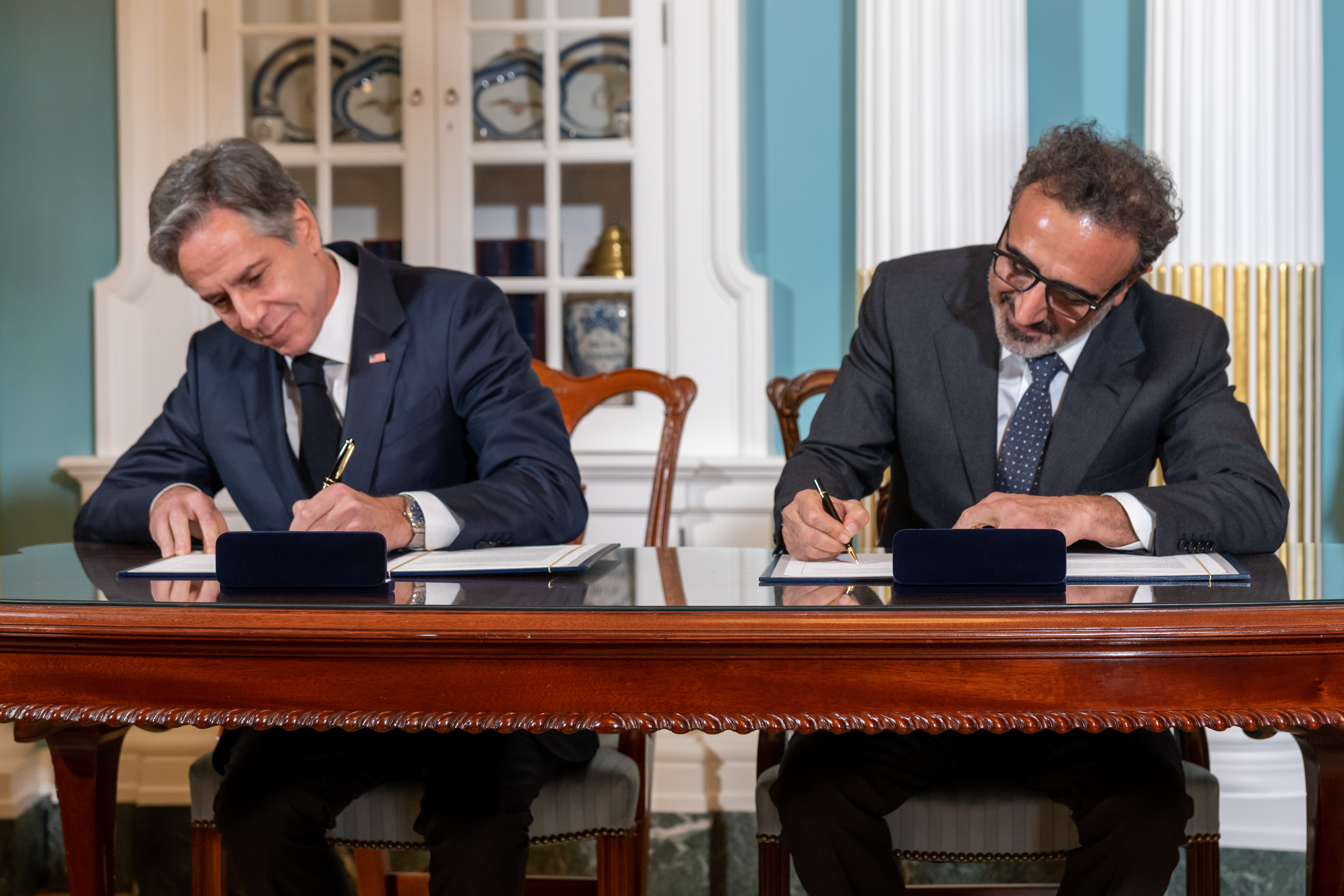
Tent Partnership for Refugees founder Hamdi Ulukaya (right) and US Secretary of State Antony Blinken sign a memorandum of understanding for a public–private partnership in 2022.

In 2015, Chobani's CEO and founder, Hamdi Ulukaya, signed the Giving Pledge, committing to give the majority of his personal wealth to help end the global refugee crisis. He founded the Tent Foundation for this purpose. In 2016, the Tent Foundation incorporated the private sector commitments announced in response to President Obama's 2016 Call to Action for Private Sector Engagement on the Global Refugee Crisis.

The Tent Partnership for Refugees was launched in 2016 at the World Economic Forum in Davos. The inaugural members of the Tent Alliance included Airbnb, Becton Dickinson, Chobani, Cotopaxi, Henry Schein, the IKEA Foundation, Johnson & Johnson, LinkedIn, MasterCard, Pearson, UPS, and Western Union. Since 2016, the Tent Partnership for Refugees has grown to over 500 major companies — including Amazon, DHL Group, Hilton, LinkedIn, L'Oréal, Marriott International, PepsiCo, Pfizer, Starbucks, and TD Bank.
