= Chobani =

American food company

Chobani LLC
- Type: Private
- Industry: Dairy products
- Founded: March 2005; 21 years ago (as Agro Farma); South Edmeston, New York, U.S.
- Founder: Hamdi Ulukaya
- Headquarters: Norwich, New York (until 2025); New York City, New York (since 2025)
- Key people: CEO: Hamdi Ulukaya; CFO: Tarkan Gürkan
- Owner: Hamdi Ulukaya (68%)
- Number of employees: 2,000+ (2018)
- Subsidiaries: La Colombe Coffee Roasters Daily Harvest
- Website: www.chobani.com

Chobani is an American food company specializing in strained yogurt. The company was founded in 2005 by Hamdi Ulukaya. Chobani sells thick, Greek yogurt with a higher protein content than traditional yogurt and is one of the main companies to popularize this style of yogurt in the US. The company has also expanded to non-dairy, plant-based products such as dairy-free vegan yogurt and oat milk. Chobani produces a variety of Greek yogurt products, oat drinks, and snacks. Chobani's yogurt market share in the U.S. rose from less than 1% in 2007 to more than 20% in 2021, and is the top-selling Greek yogurt brand in the United States and operates the largest yogurt facility in the world. In April 2016, Chobani announced it was giving 10 percent of its ownership stake to its employees.

In December 2023, Chobani entered the cold coffee market through the acquisition of La Colombe Coffee Roasters for $900 million.

== Establishment and early years ==
Chobani was founded by Hamdi Ulukaya, a Turkish businessman, activist, and philanthropist who emigrated to the United States in 1994. Ulukaya said the name Chobani comes from the Greek word “chopani”.

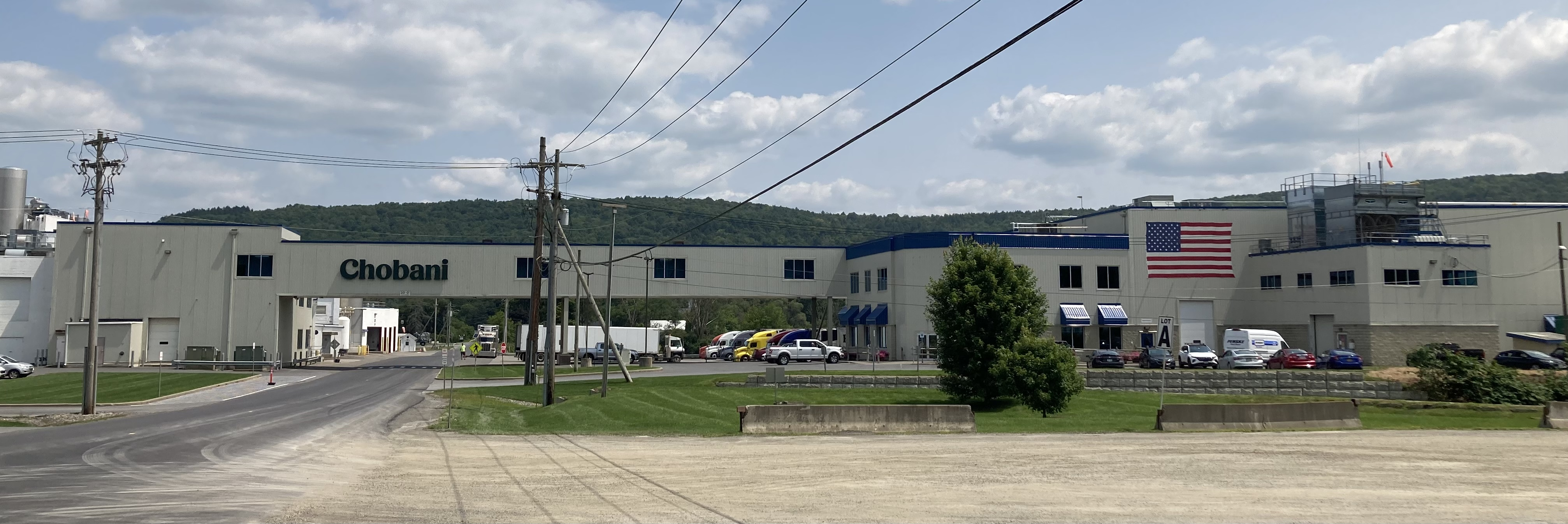
The Chobani yogurt plant near South Edmeston, New York.

Chobani was inspired by Ulukaya's childhood spent raising sheep and goats and making cheese with his family. Not impressed by the yogurt options available in the US, Ulukaya made strained yogurt at his home in Upstate New York. He hired a yogurt master from Turkey, with whom he developed his own recipe. Using different bacterial cultures at differing temperatures and fermentation durations, they tested hundreds of recipes to come up with a yogurt with the desired taste, texture, and natural shelf life. Strained yogurt is thicker, creamier and tangier, with a higher protein content, as the whey is strained out. Ulukaya bought a plant in the town of South Edmeston, New York, that was being closed by Kraft Foods; Ulukaya purchased it with a Small Business Administration Loan. Ulukaya hired several of the former Kraft employees and launched his brand in 2007. In 2009, the chain stores Stop & Shop and ShopRite began carrying Chobani, and by the middle of 2009, Chobani was selling 200,000 cases a week. Later that same year, a major breakthrough came when the warehouse club stores BJ's Wholesale Club and Costco began carrying the brand. Ulukaya began adding new product lines to his brand in 2010. By 2010, Chobani realized over $1 billion in annual sales and became the leading seller of Greek yogurt in the U.S.

== Later history and expansion ==
In November 2011, Chobani expanded into Victoria, Australia through the purchase of Victorian dairy company Bead Foods. It then invested $30m to expand the facility and began manufacturing from the Dandenong South plant in December 2012. In 2012, the brand opened its second plant in what became the world's largest yogurt facility in Twin Falls, Idaho, with an initial investment of $750 million. The move created approximately 7,000 jobs, and unemployment rates in the region dropped from 6.3% to 2.4%. Chobani also opened its first brick-and-mortar cafe in SoHo, New York City in July 2012. In 2012, Chobani paid a $130,000 fine to the Susquehanna River Basin Commission for overpumping millions of gallons of water over a six year period without permits, amid claims from neighboring residents that their wells for drinking water had been depleted.

Following the success of its product in Australia, in 2014 Chobani expanded its distribution to Asia and Latin America, beginning with Singapore, Malaysia, and Panama. The company announced plans for the Caribbean as well. In April 2014, Chobani reached a deal with private-equity firm TPG for a $750-million investment, which funded the company's expansion and the launch of a new line of products. In 2014 the company launched Chobani Oats, a blend of Greek yogurt, steel-cut oats and fruit; Seasonal varieties, including watermelon and pink grapefruit; Chobani Indulgent, a dessert yogurt; and a 4%-fat plain Greek yogurt. Chobani introduced its products in Mexico in August 2016.

In 2017, Chobani surpassed Yoplait as the No. 2 manufacturer in overall yogurt. The company also announced a $20 million expansion of the Twin Falls plant, with a 70,000 square-foot facility and a new global research and development center. When Chobani was launched, Greek yogurt made up less than 1% of the yogurt market in the U.S. As of 2017, Greek yogurt accounted for 50% of U.S. yogurt sales.

In September 2022, Chobani withdrew its plans for an initial public offering of more than $10 billion citing current market conditions. It had filed to go public in July 2021. At the time, the company had experienced five consecutive years with net losses, and some investors were concerned that the $10 billion valuation was too high.

In May 2025, the company acquired Daily Harvest and expanded into ready to eat meals. On October 16, 2025, Chobani announced it had secured $0.65B in equity capital to expand production at its facilities in New York and Idaho. The funds will help finance a $500 million plant expansion in Idaho, expected to increase the factory's production by nearly 50%, and the construction of a new $1.2 billion food-processing plant in Rome, New York. With the Idaho plant expansion, the company reached an agreement with a local water municipality to pump an additional one million gallons of water daily from the Eastern Snake River Plain Aquifer, requiring the construction of a Chobani-funded booster pump station to draw more groundwater as well as publicly funded pumps and motors. In 2026, Chobani broke ground on the $567 million expansion of its La Colombe facility in Norton Shores, MI.

=== Chobani House ===
In 2024, Chobani announced the creation of Chobani House, the company's new global headquarters at 360 Bowery, a 22-story, 275-foot-tall boutique commercial office tower on the southwest corner of the Bowery and East 4th Street in the NoHo neighborhood of Manhattan, New York City. The ground floor was intended to house a community kitchen preparing nutritious meals for people in need, and the building was to serve as headquarters for several nonprofits, including founder Hamdi Ulukaya's Tent Partnership for Refugees. New York Governor Kathy Hochul called the move "a testament to our diverse talent, skills and industries."

== Products ==
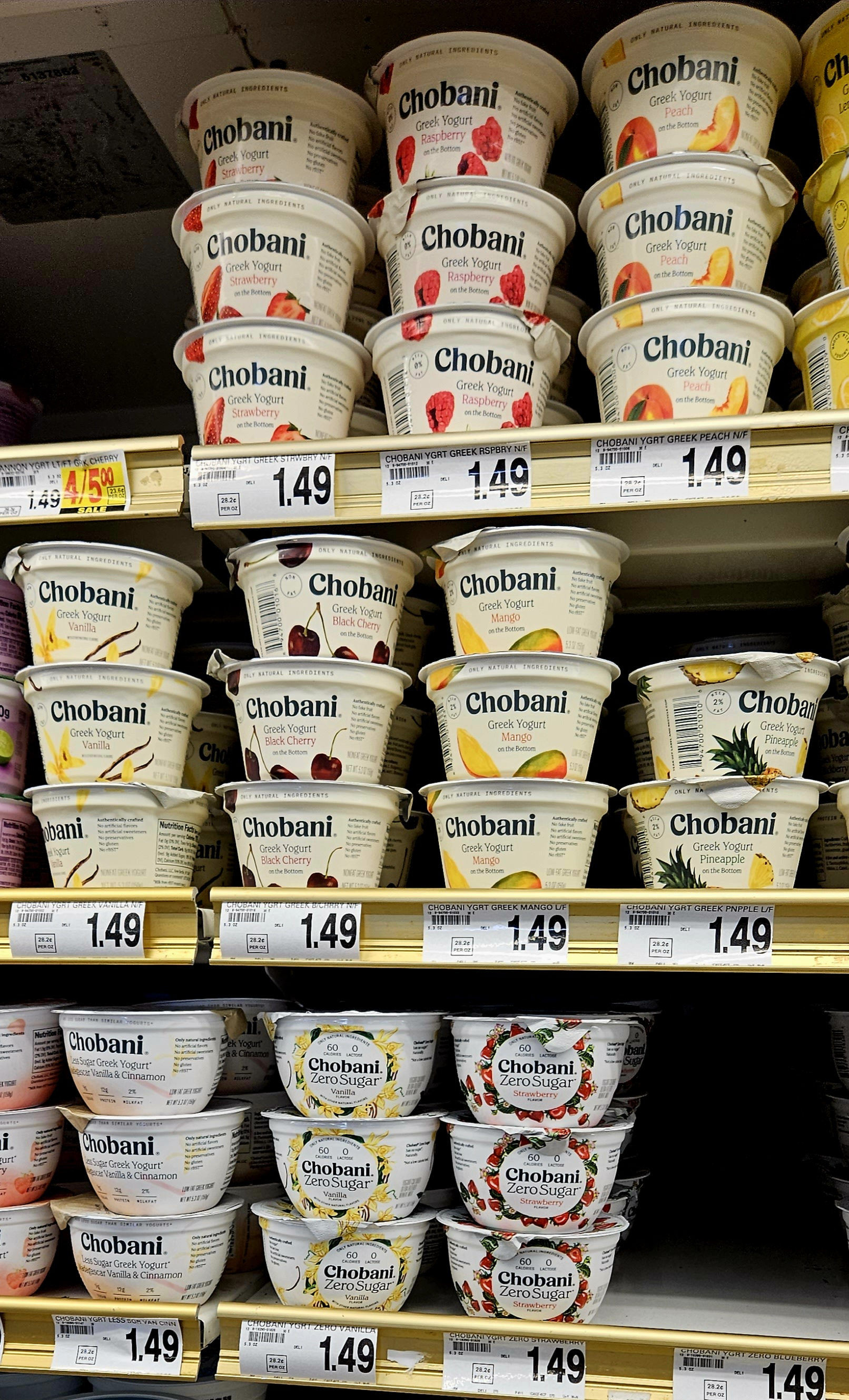
Containers of Chobani yogurt in a store.

Initial Chobani yogurt flavors included plain, vanilla, strawberry, peach, and blueberry. Later products included a yogurt-based condiment, plant-based beverages with organic oats as well as milk and cream from the company's yogurt-making process, four flavors of iced coffee, nutritional shakes, and probiotic yogurt and drinks. Restaurants offering Chobani products include Tim Hortons.

== Employees ==
Approximately 30% of Chobani's workforce consists of refugees and immigrants. In 2016, following reports on Chobani's practice of employing refugees, the company received calls for boycotts and death threats.

In April 2016, Chobani announced it was giving 10 percent of its ownership stake to its employees. The company allotted shares to its employees based on tenure, and would be paid out at the time that the company goes public or is sold to another entity. In October 2016, the company announced that it was implementing a program to give six weeks of paid parental leave to new parents, later increased to 12 weeks in 2025. In 2021, wages increased for the company's hourly workers, making up 70% of people employed by the company, from $13 to at least $15.

== Community involvement and sponsorships ==
=== Philanthropy ===
Corporate philanthropy focuses on childhood nutrition, the communities near its plants in New York and Idaho, and disaster relief in the U.S. The company makes and distributes Chobani Super Milk, a shelf stable high protein milk, to food banks and through the Red Cross for disaster relief.

=== Sponsorships ===
In 2012, Chobani became an official sponsor of the U.S. Olympic Team and premiered their first national commercial during the 2012 Summer Olympics opening ceremony. Chobani secured naming rights of European soccer team Fenerbahçe's Şükrü Saracoğlu Stadium in Istanbul in 2025 for 5+5 years, also they became team's kit sponsor for UEFA competitions for 2+3 years. In 2025, it partnered with U.S. Soccer to support youth soccer clubs in the U.S.

=== Chobani Incubator ===
Hamdi Ulukaya launched the Chobani Food Incubator in 2016 to support entrepreneurs at food and beverage startup companies with a non-equity investment, resources, mentorship and programming. In 2018, the company announced the creation of the Chobani Incubator Food Tech Residency. Participants in the incubator program have included Banza, Misfit Juicery, Chloe's Fruit, Pique Tea Crystals, NOKA, MatchaBar, and Ithaca Cold-Crafted.

In November 2019, the Chobani Incubator introduced its new Vets Cohort to help current and former armed service members who are also food entrepreneurs grow their businesses. The program was formed through a partnership with the Institute for Veterans and Military Families at Syracuse University.

== Legal issues and product recalls ==
In 2013, Chobani was ordered to change its yogurt's labeling in England and Wales after a judge ruled that the wording "Greek yoghurt" (rather than Greek-style) misled consumers into thinking the yogurt was made in Greece (yogurt imported from Greece is sold in Britain, and is the only type sold as "Greek").

On September 3, 2013, Chobani pulled some of its Greek-style yogurt from supermarket shelves after hearing of "swelling or bloating" in cups. The company said it has investigated and found a type of mold commonly found in dairy that may be to blame. Chobani announced a voluntary recall on September 5 in cooperation with the FDA. On September 9, 2013, the FDA reported at least 89 people reported becoming sick after eating the yogurt.
