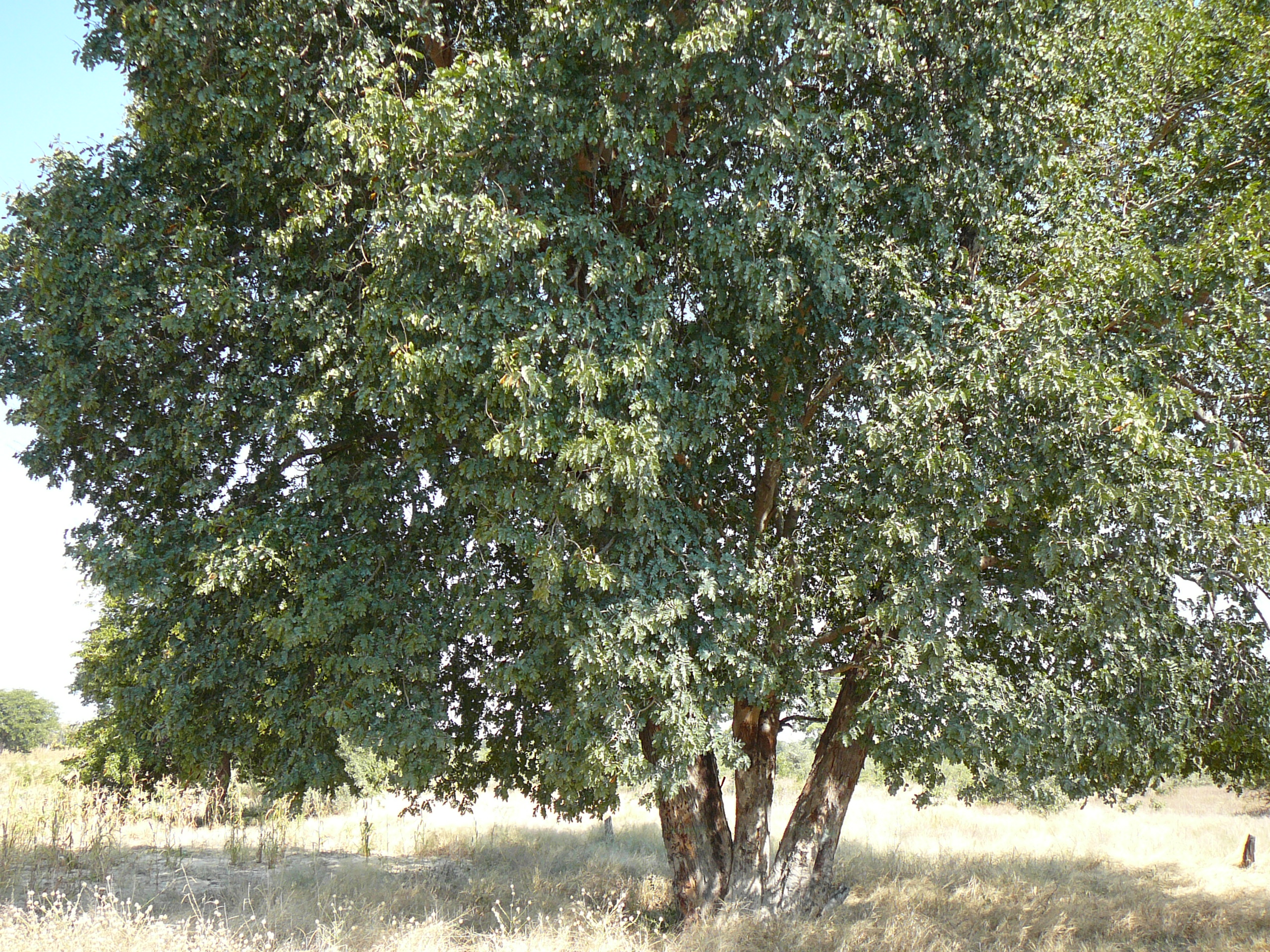
- Tree in Namibia

Conservation status
- Near Threatened (IUCN 2.3)

Scientific classification
- Kingdom: Plantae
- Clade: Embryophytes
- Clade: Tracheophytes
- Clade: Spermatophytes
- Clade: Angiosperms
- Clade: Eudicots
- Clade: Rosids
- Order: Fabales
- Family: Fabaceae
- Genus: Baikiaea
- Species: B. plurijuga

Binomial name
- Baikiaea plurijuga Harms
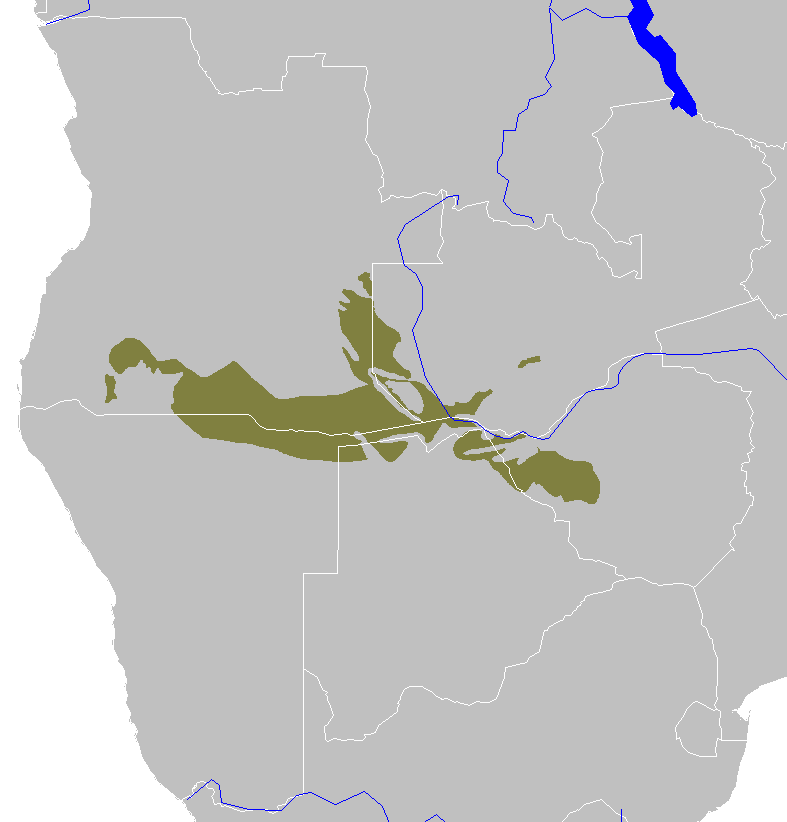
- The range of Baikiaea woodlands

= Baikiaea plurijuga =

Species of legume

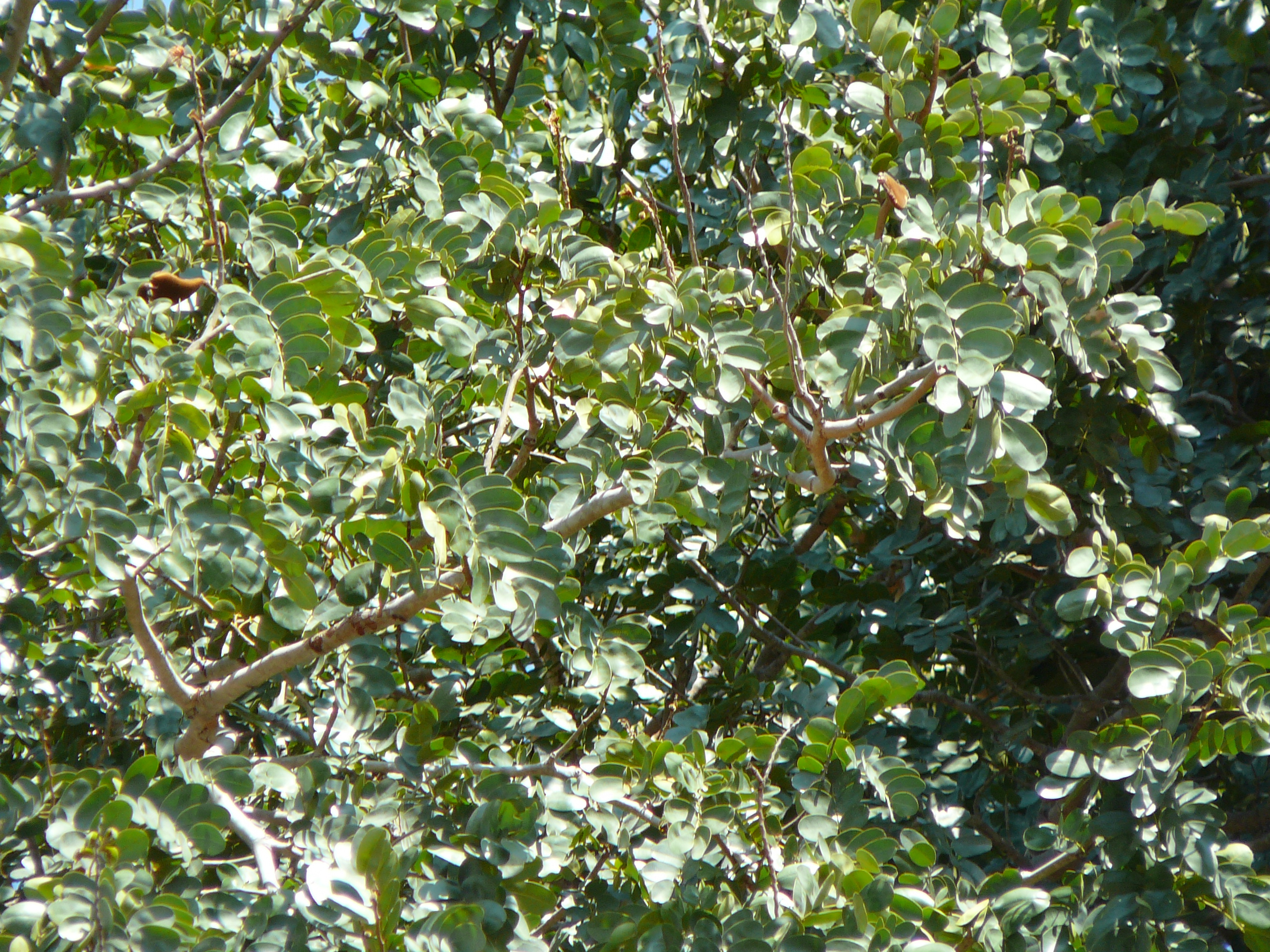
Baikiaea plurijuga - MHNT

Baikiaea plurijuga, known as African teak, Mukusi, Rhodesian teak, Zambian teak, or Zambesi redwood, is a species of Afrotropical tree from the legume family, Fabaceae. It is native to southern Africa. The genus is named for William Balfour Baikie (1824-1864), a Scottish explorer of the Niger River, and the species name means "having many pairs."

== Description ==
Baikiaea plurijuga is a medium-sized deciduous tree with pinnate leaves, each with 4-5 pairs of opposed leaflets. They show pink to deep mauve flowers, have yellow stamens, and are clustered in large axillary racemes; they flower from November to April. The fruit are flattened, woody pods with a hooked tip that splits explosively, sending the seeds out over some distance.

== Habitat ==
Baikiaea plurijuga is confined to the Kalahari sands, and its dominant woodland is known as Gusu woodland. This woodland grows on the deep, aeolian, and fluvial Kalahari Sands, which have virtually no clay or silt. These sands provide exceptional growing conditions for deep-rooting trees, but the deficiency in clay restricts tree growth to sites holding nutrients in organic matter.

== Distribution ==
Baikiaea plurijuga occurs in southern Angola, northern Botswana, northern Namibia, southern Zambia, and northern Zimbabwe.

== Uses ==
The wood of Baikiaea plurijuga forms a dense hardwood, making it difficult to work. Still, it is valued for its termite resistance and resistance to rot and is used for railway sleepers, construction, and furniture making. The commercial timber industry has over-exploited extensive teak forests in some parts of its range (e.g., in Sesheke District, Zambia). However, Baikiaea plurijuga is not listed in the CITES Appendices.

== Conservation ==
Baikiaea plurijuga is classified as Near Threatened because its forests have been considerably reduced due to high logging levels over the last half-century. Older, mature trees are also scarce. However, the species' geographic range has only diminished by a fraction as the species can regenerate readily in modified habitats and tolerates coppicing very well. It is legally protected in Namibia.

== See also ==
- Baikiain, a chemical compound isolated from and named after Baikiaea plurijuga
