= Daily Harvest =

American service for frozen, plant-based food

Daily Harvest Inc.
- Type: Private
- Industry: Food & beverage
- Founded: March 2015; 11 years ago
- Founder: Rachel Drori
- Headquarters: New York (state)
- Key people: CEO: Ricky Silver
- Owner: Chobani
- Website: daily-harvest.com

Daily Harvest is an American direct-to-consumer frozen plant-based meal kit manufacturer.

Headquartered in New York City, the company ships pre-portioned meals and snacks, including smoothies, harvest bowls, flatbreads, and soups, within the contiguous United States. Founded in 2015 by Rachel Drori, Daily Harvest experienced rapid growth and achieved a valuation of over one billion dollars by 2021. In 2022 the brand experienced a major product recall linked to hundreds of reports of severe illness. In 2025, Chobani purchased the company.

== History ==
The company was established after founder Rachel Drori, then a marketing executive, identified a personal need for convenient and nutritious meals. She began the business by creating and delivering smoothie packs from her own kitchen before officially launching the business in 2015. Initially focused on ready-to-blend smoothies, the company expanded its product line in 2017 to include soups and subsequently added a variety of other plant-based items, such as harvest bowls and flatbreads.

In 2024, the company began marketing to consumers using GLP-1 medications and entered into a partnership with diet company Noom.

In May of 2025, Chobani purchased Daily Harvest.

== Business model and products ==
The brand sells frozen, plant-based food directly to consumers, offering both one-time purchases and optional subscription deliveries. Customers select a plan based on the number of items they wish to receive and build a box from the company's menu. All products are delivered frozen. The company's marketing highlights its use of organic ingredients and its avoidance of gluten, dairy, gums, and artificial additives, stating that over 95% of its ingredients are organic. The products are designed to be prepared quickly, with most requiring only blending or heating.

In 2023, Daily Harvest expanded into the retail market, with frozen food items being sold in Kroger grocery stores. In May of 2024, the company also expanded into Target Corporation stores.

By 2026, Daily Harvest products were sold through retailers including Kroger, Target, Wegmans, and Costco, while the company's direct-to-consumer business increasingly focused on smoothies and breakfast products.

In January 2026, Daily Harvest ended the subscription-only model it had used since the company's founding, allowing customers to purchase products individually or through recurring subscriptions. The company also introduced new product lines, including high-protein smoothies, high-protein oat bowls, and functional elixirs made from fruit and vegetable purées.

== Funding and growth ==
The company's expansion has been fueled by significant venture capital investment. In 2017, Daily Harvest raised a $43 million Series B round with backing from Lightspeed Venture Partners, VMG Partners, and celebrity investors including Bobby Flay, Gwyneth Paltrow and Serena Williams. A subsequent Series D funding round in November 2021, led by Lone Pine Capital, raised an additional $77 million. This round brought the company's valuation to $1.1 billion.

== Organic farming initiatives ==
In 2022, Daily Harvest launched The Almond Project to test the impact of four farming methods—conventional, organic, conventional with regenerative practices, and regenerative-organic—in almond farming.

In 2024, Daily Harvest entered its final year of a three-year project to support small-scale, US-based BIPOC farmers with the transition to organic farming. The company’s partners in this project are the American Farmland Trust and California Certified Organic Farmers. The project offers farmers technical resources like workshops, mentorships, and financial assistance.

== 2022 recall ==
In June 2022, Daily Harvest faced a significant public health crisis and brand controversy regarding its French Lentil + Leek Crumbles product. Customers began reporting severe gastrointestinal distress and liver dysfunction after consumption, with symptoms including extreme abdominal pain, fever, and, in several dozen cases, requiring gallbladder removal. After receiving over 470 reports of illness and an investigation was opened by the U.S. Food and Drug Administration (FDA), Daily Harvest issued a voluntary recall of the product.

In July 2022, the company announced that its investigation, conducted in partnership with the FDA, had identified tara flour as the likely source of the illnesses. Tara flour, a high-protein ingredient derived from the tara tree, was a new component in the company's supply chain and was sourced from a single producer for use in the crumbles. The incident led to hundreds of lawsuits filed against Daily Harvest by affected consumers seeking damages for medical bills, lost wages, and other hardships. Two years after the outbreak, the FDA declared tara flour unsafe. The litigation, including the class action, was resolved in early 2025, with payments expected to be made to claimants through the end of the year.

According to Bloomberg and Fortune, the company's handling of the crisis drew widespread criticism from consumers and in media reports. Daily Harvest's initial communication on June 17 was a direct email to customers who had received the product that did not use the word "recall". Several people who spoke to the Fortune reporter said the language didn’t align with the seriousness of the reported illnesses. The company also faced backlash for its social media response, where it initially updated old promotional posts for the crumbles with a link to a statement, rather than creating new, prominent warning posts.

In response to the recall, the company initiated a review of its protocols. In July of 2025, CEO Ricky Silver told Good Housekeeping the company had implemented “a stricter review of ingredients, particularly novel ingredients” and “added checks to ensure historical validation of ingredients in their products in the U.S. market.”
