= Baikiain =

Names
- IUPAC name (2S)-1,2,3,6-Tetrahydropyridine-2-carboxylic acid
- Other names (-)-(S)-Baikiain; L-Baikiain; (S)-4,5-Didehydropipecolic acid

Identifiers
CAS Number	31456-71-0
3D model (JSmol)	Interactive image
ChEBI	CHEBI:6199
ChemSpider	390175
KEGG	C08268
PubChem CID	441442
CompTox Dashboard (EPA)	DTXSID20331580
- InChI: InChI=1S/C6H9NO2/c8-6(9)5-3-1-2-4-7-5/h1-2,5,7H,3-4H2,(H,8,9)/t5-/m0/s1 Key: YCQPUTODZKESPK-YFKPBYRVSA-N
- SMILES: C1C=CCN[C@@H]1C(=O)O

Properties
Chemical formula	C_{6}H_{9}NO_{2}
Molar mass	127.143 g·mol^{−1}
- Except where otherwise noted, data are given for materials in their standard state (at 25 °C [77 °F], 100 kPa). Infobox references

Baikiain is an organic compound with the molecular formula C_{6}H_{9}NO_{2}. Chemically, it is classified as a tetrahydropyridine substituted with a carboxylic acid. Because it contains both this carboxylic acid and an adjacent amine group, it is also an alpha-amino acid. Baikiain is one of the two enantiomers of the chiral compound 4,5-didehydropipecolic acid.

== Sources ==
Baikiain has been found in diverse natural sources including dates, African teak (Baikiaea plurijuga) wood, and the red algae Serraticardia maxima.

Several laboratory syntheses of baikiain and its racemic form have been reported.

== Effects ==
Baikiain is hypothesized to be the causative agent of illnesses resulting from consumption of food products containing tara flour. In several cases documented in 2022 people became ill after consuming meals containing tara flour with high concentrations of Baikian (3% dry weight). People experienced acute gastrointestinal and liver disease with clinical signs of hepatotoxicity. Baikiain was found not to harm mammalian or human cells in culture but did cause liver injury and depletion of glutathione in rodent models.
