= Summit Lake (Edmeston, Otsego County, New York) =

Lake in New York, United States

- Location of Summit Lake within New York State
- Location: Otsego County, New York
- Coordinates: 42°46′10″N 75°12′08″W
- Surface area: 34 acres (14 ha)
- Surface elevation: 1,650 feet (500 m)
- Settlements: North Edmeston

Summit Lake is a small lake in Otsego County, New York. It is located northeast of North Edmeston. Summit Lake drains east via an unnamed creek which flows into Wharton Creek.
