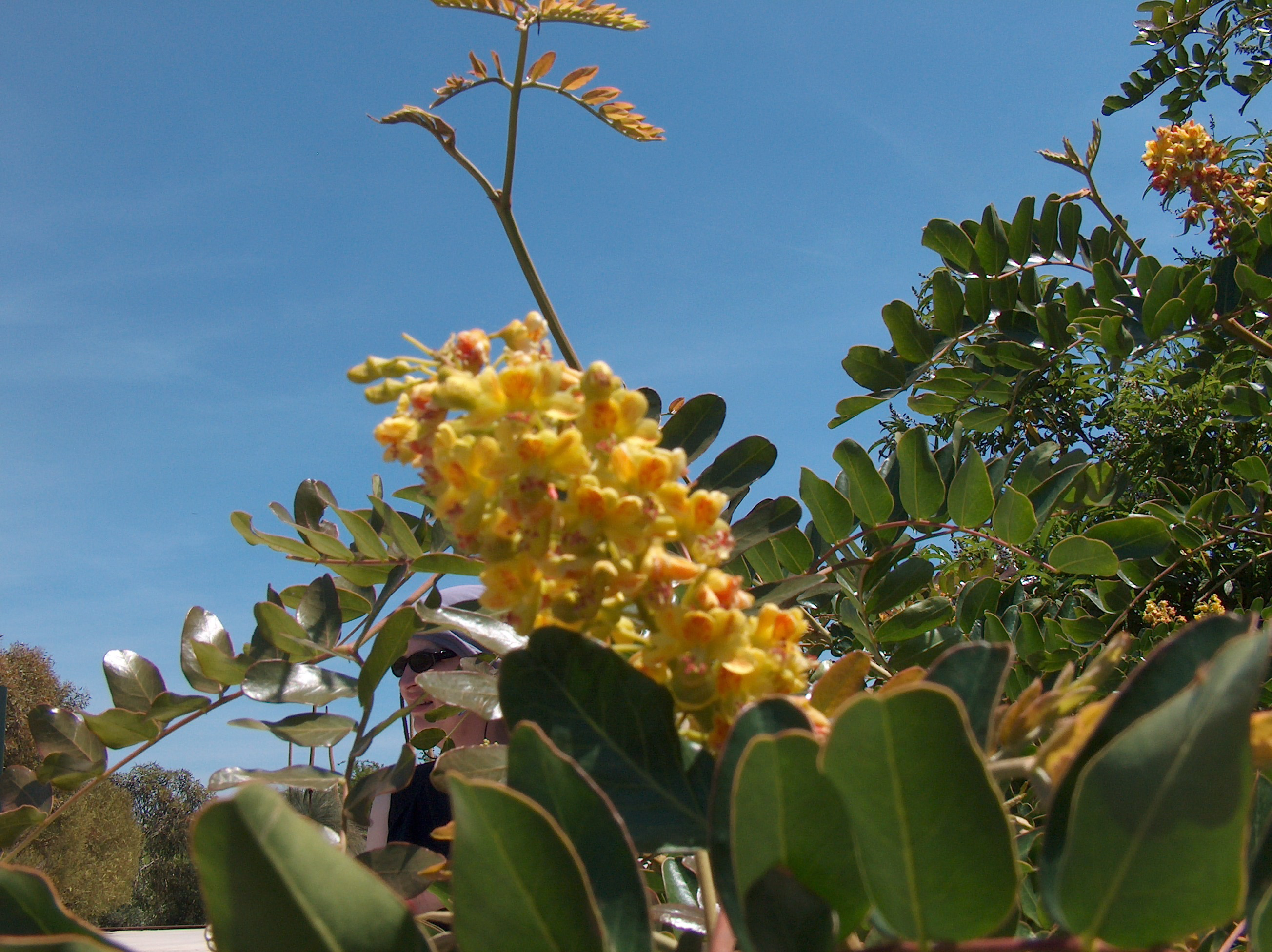

Scientific classification
- Kingdom: Plantae
- Clade: Tracheophytes
- Clade: Angiosperms
- Clade: Eudicots
- Clade: Rosids
- Order: Fabales
- Family: Fabaceae
- Subfamily: Caesalpinioideae
- Genus: Tara
- Species: T. spinosa

Binomial name
- Tara spinosa (Feuillée ex Molina) Britton & Rose

Synonyms
- Caesalpinia pectinata Cav.; Caesalpinia spinosa (Feuillée ex Molina) Kuntze; Caesalpinia tara Ruiz & Pav.; Caesalpinia tinctoria Dombey ex DC.; Caesalpinia tinctoria (Kunth) Benth. ex Reiche; Coulteria tinctoria Kunth; Poinciana spinosa Feuillée ex Molina; Tara tinctoria Molina

= Tara spinosa =

Species of legume

Tara spinosa, commonly known as tara (Quechua), also known as Peruvian carob or spiny holdback, is a small leguminous tree or thorny shrub native to Peru. T. spinosa is cultivated as a source of tannins based on a galloylated quinic acid structure. This chemical structure has been confirmed also by LC–MS. It is also grown as an ornamental plant because of its large colorful flowers and pods.

== Names and taxonomy ==
Its common names include spiny holdback, tara, taya, and algarroba tanino (Peru).

Tara spinosa is placed in the family Fabaceae, subfamily Caesalpinioideae, and tribe Caesalpinieae.

== Description ==
Tara spinosa typically grows 2–5 m (6.6–16.4 ft) tall; its bark is dark gray with scattered prickles and hairy twigs. Leaves are alternate, evergreen, lacking stipules, bipinnate, and lacking petiolar and rachis glands. Leaves consist of three to ten pairs of primary leaflets under 8 cm (3.1 in) in length, and five to seven pairs of subsessile elliptic secondary leaflets, each about 1.5–4 cm (0.6–2 in) long. Inflorescences are 15–20 cm (5.9–7.9 in) long terminal racemes, many flowered and covered in tiny hairs. Flowers are yellow to orange with 6- to 7-mm petals; the lowest sepal is boat-shaped with many long marginal teeth; stamens are yellow, irregular in length and barely protruding. The fruit is a flat, oblong indehiscent pod, about 6–12 cm (2.4–4.7 in) long and 2.5 cm (0.98 in) wide, containing four to seven round black seeds, which redden when mature.

== Distribution and habitat ==
Tara spinosa is native to Peru and can be found growing throughout northern, western, and southern South America, from Venezuela to Argentina. It has been introduced in drier parts of Asia, the Middle East, and Africa and has become naturalized in California. T. spinosa grows in the nearly rainless lomas or fog oases of the Peruvian coastal desert.

Generally resistant to most pathogens and pests, it grows at elevations between 0 and 3,000 m (9,800 ft) above sea level, and tolerates dry climates and poor soils, including those high in sand and rocks. To propagate, seeds must be scarified (treated to break physical dormancy), and young plants should be transplanted to the field at 40 cm (16 in) in height; trees begin to produce after 4–5 years. Mature pods are usually harvested by hand and typically sun dried before processing. If well irrigated, trees can continue to produce for another 80 years, though their highest production is between 15 and 65 years of age.

== Uses ==
=== Industrial ===
Tara spinosa pods are an excellent source of tannins (tara tannins) most commonly used in the manufacture of automotive and furniture leathers. This growing industry is developing around their production in Peru. Some producers have their own plantations to guarantee constant quality.

Tara tannin derivatives are being proposed as antifouling against marine organisms that can grow on ship hulls. Those tannins are of the hydrolysable type. Gallic acid is the main constituent of tara tannins (53%) and can be easily isolated by alkaline hydrolysis of the plant extract.

Quinic acid is also a constituent of the tara tannins. Its tannins are colourless or light making them suitable a premordant in the dyeing of cotton and other cellulose fibres.

The tree can also be a source of lumber and firewood, and as a live fence.

The seeds can be used to produce black dye, while dark blue dye can be obtained from the roots.

=== Food additives ===
Major food additives derived from T. spinosa include tara flour, which is potentially toxic, and tara gum, commonly used as a thickener and stabilizer. Tara flour is produced from the germ (embryo) of the tara seed, while gum is produced from the seed's endosperm.

==== Tara flour toxicity in humans ====
At least 393 people who had consumed Daily Harvest’s "French Lentil and Leek Crumbles” in April-June 2022 became ill with signs of gastrointestinal disease and hepatotoxicity. Signs of toxicity occurred within 4-12 hours after ingestion and included abdominal pain, nausea and vomiting. In some people clinical signs were severe enough to result in visits to the emergency department and hospitalisation with cholecystectomy performed.

On July 19, 2022, the food company Daily Harvest had identified tara flour, which is derived from the seeds of Tara spinosa, as the ingredient that had sickened hundreds of its customers. The manufacturer removed the product from the market in June 2022 and no more cases were identified.

Further analysis found Daily Harvest’s "French Lentil and Leek Crumbles” was free of contamination with known toxic compounds including microbial or viral pathogens, mycotoxins, allergens, heavy metals, and pesticides. However, one of the major ingredients was tara flour which contained several suspect non-protein amino acids including baikiain at 3% dry weight. Subsequent rodent studies showed baikiain as a liver toxin and is hypothesized to be the chemical compound responsible for the hepatotoxicity.

A handful of lawsuits have been filed against the company.

==== Tara flour banned by FDA ====
On May 15, 2024, the U.S. Food and Drug Administration (FDA) banned the use of tara flour, having determined tara flour in human food does not meet the generally recognized as safe (or GRAS) standard and is an unapproved food additive.

==== Tara gum ====
Tara gum, produced from a different part of the tara seed, remains safe to consume. According to the FDA, tara gum has a well established safety profile and is "distinct from tara flour". Tara gum is a white or beige, nearly odorless powder that is produced by separating and grinding the endosperm of T. spinosa seeds. Tara gum consists of a linear main chain of (1-4)-β-D-mannopyranose units attached by (1–6) linkages with α-D-galactopyranose units. The major component of the gum is a galactomannan polymer similar to the main components of guar and locust bean gums that are used widely in the food industry. The ratio of mannose to galactose in tara gum is 3:1. Tara gum has been deemed safe for human consumption as a food additive.

Tara gum is used as a thickening agent and stabilizer in a number of food applications. A solution of tara gum is less viscous than a guar gum solution of the same concentration, but more viscous than a solution of locust bean gum. Furthermore, tara gum shows an intermediate acid stability between locust bean gum and guar gum. It resists the depolymerisation effect of organic acids down to a pH of 3.5. This gum is also stable to high-temperature treatment, up to 145 °C in a continuous process plant. Blends of tara with modified and unmodified starches can be produced which have enhanced stabilization and emulsification properties, and these are used in the preparation of convenience foods, such as ice cream. One example is the American ice cream brand Breyers.

The European food additive number for tara gum is E417. Tara gum is listed on the Canadian List of Permitted Emulsifying, Gelling, Stabilizing or Thickening Agents (Lists of Permitted Food Additives) as item T.2B.
