= Wharton Creek (Unadilla River tributary) =

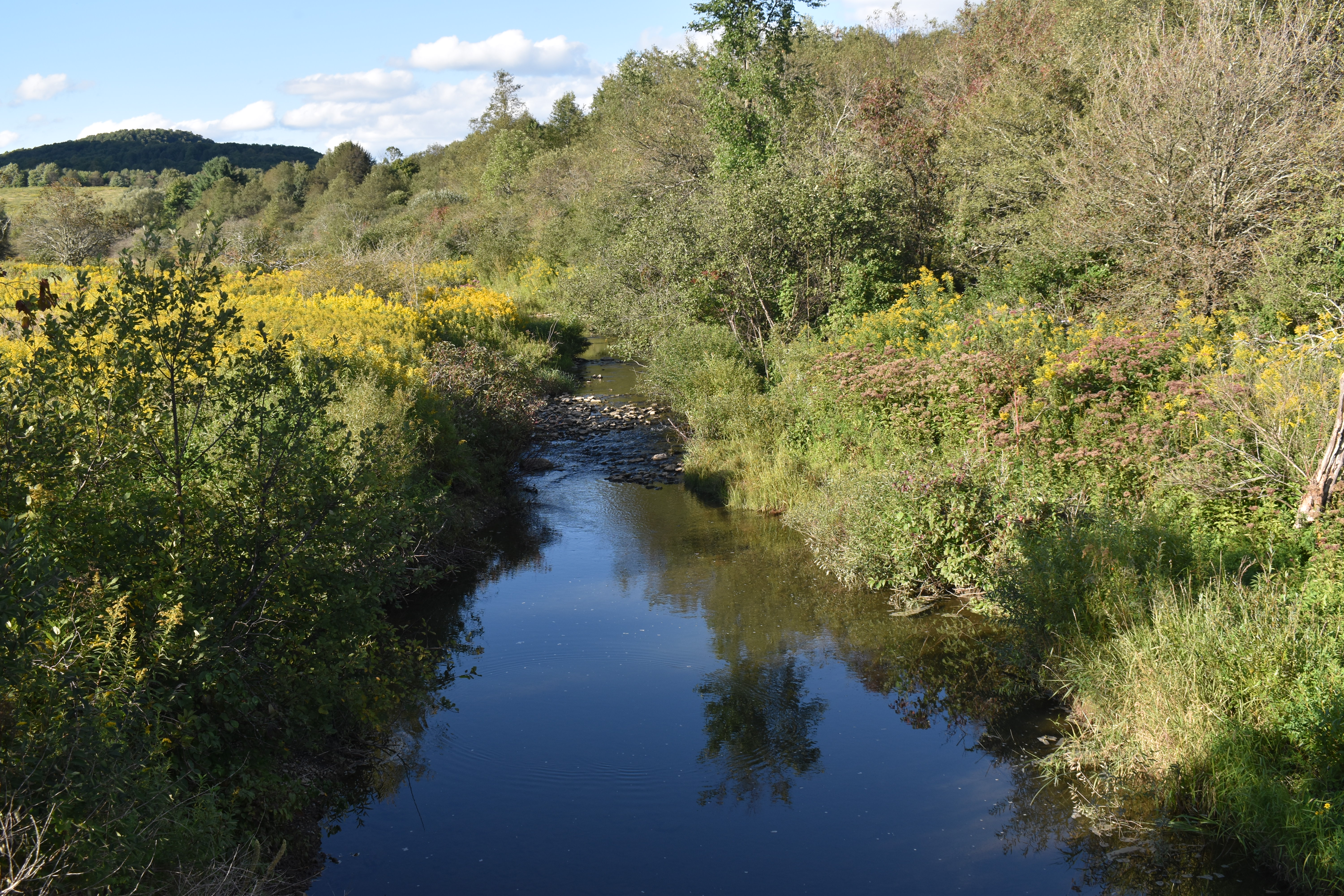
- Wherton Creek upstream of County Route 23

- Location of the mouth of Wharton Creek Wharton Creek (Unadilla River tributary) (the United States)

Location
- Country: United States
- State: New York
- Region: Central New York
- County: Otsego
- Towns: Richfield, Plainfield, Exeter, Burlington, Edmeston, Pittsfield

Physical characteristics
- Mouth: Unadilla River
  - location: New Berlin
  - coordinates: 42°37′06″N 75°19′40″W
- Length: 36.1 mi (58.1 km)
- Basin size: 92.4 sq mi (239 km^{2})

Basin features
- Progression: Wharton Creek → Unadilla River → Susquehanna River → Chesapeake Bay → Atlantic Ocean
- Tributaries
  - left: Fly Brook, Dundee Brook
  - right: Mill Creek

Wharton Creek is a 36.1-mile-long (58.1 km) tributary of the Unadilla River in western Otsego County, in the state of New York. Via the Unadilla River, it is part of the Susquehanna River watershed, flowing to the Chesapeake Bay.

Wharton Creek rises in the town of Richfield and flows southwest through the towns of Plainfield, Exeter, Burlington, Edmeston, and Pittsfield, where it empties into the Unadilla River at the village of New Berlin.

== Tributaries ==
Fly Brook converges with Wharton Creek south of Burlington Flats. Dundee Brook converges with Wharton Creek north-northeast of Burlington Flats.

== See also ==
- List of rivers in New York
