= West Edmeston, New York =

- Hamlet
- Location within New York Location within the United States
- Coordinates: 42°45′46″N 75°16′38″W
- Country: United States
- State: New York
- Counties: Madison and Otsego
- Towns: Brookfield and Edmeston
- Time zone: UTC-5 (Eastern (EST))
  - Summer (DST): UTC-4 (EDT)
- ZIP code: 13485

West Edmeston is a hamlet on the Unadilla River on the border of the town of Brookfield in Madison County and the town of Edmeston in Otsego County, New York, United States.

On August 24, 1898, the new First Day Baptist Church building was opened in West Edmeston. Conceived in January 1897, the church was formally organized in February 1898 and admitted to the Otsego County Baptist Association.

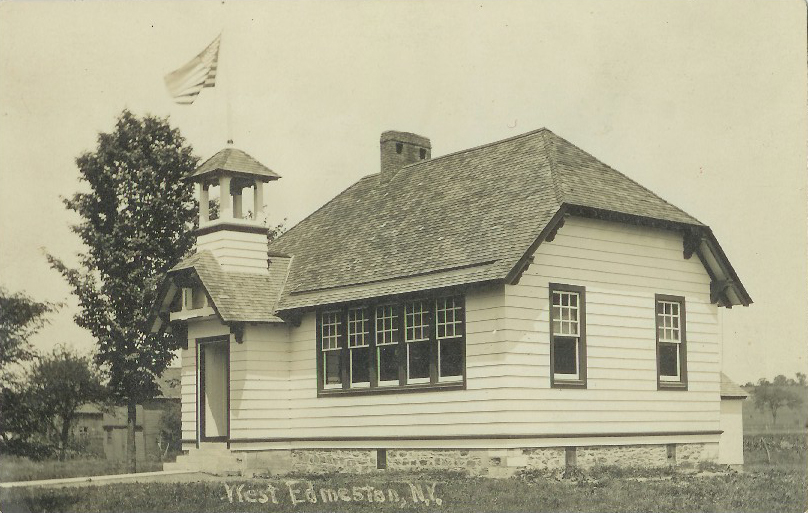
West Edmeston School

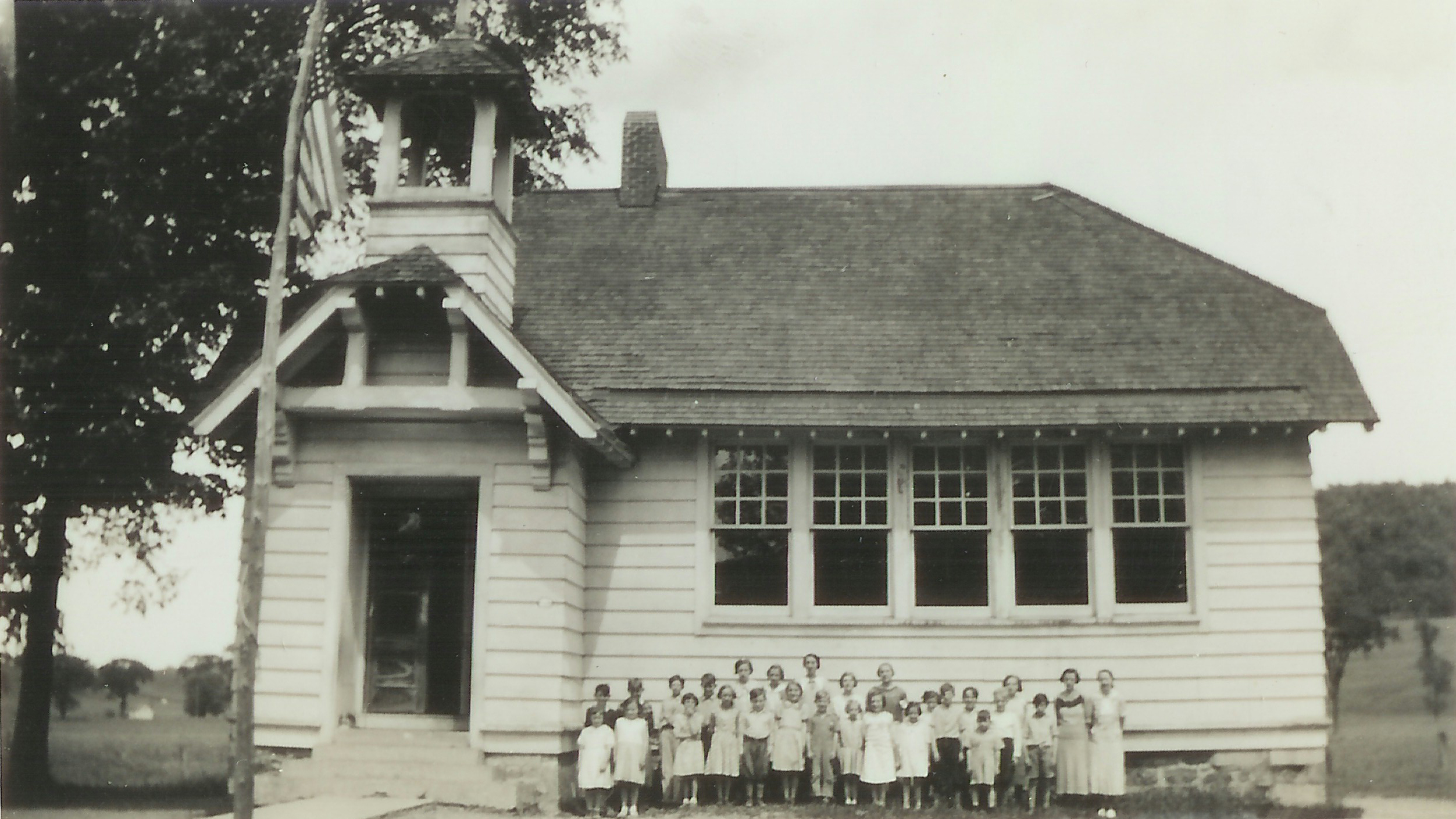
West Edmeston School
