= Basswood Pond =

Body of water in New York state

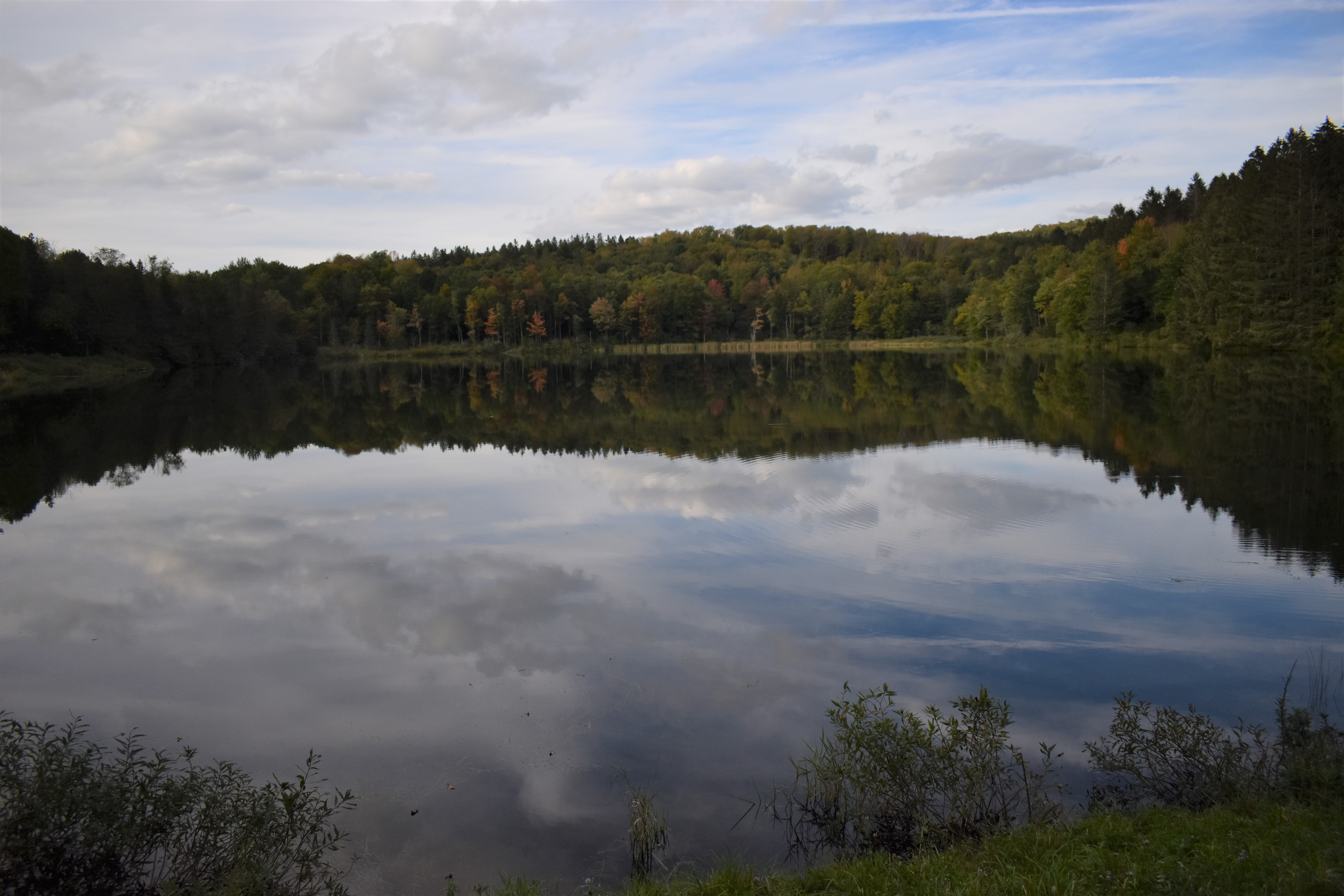
- Basswood Pond September 2021

- Location within New York Basswood Pond (the United States)
- Location: Otsego County, New York
- Coordinates: 42°44′44″N 75°07′15″W
- Surface area: 15.6 acres (6.3 ha)
- Max. depth: 15 feet (4.6 m)
- Shore length^{1}: 0.5 miles (0.80 km)
- Surface elevation: 1,758 feet (536 m)
- Settlements: Burlington
- ^{1} Shore length is not a well-defined measure.

Basswood Pond is a small lake in Otsego County, New York. It is located north of Burlington within Basswood Pond State Forest. Basswood Pond drains south via an unnamed creek which flows into Butternut Creek. The pond is located within the Basswood Pond State Forest, which includes roughly 7.5 miles (12.1 km) hiking trails.

== History ==
In 1958, work began to convert the swamp into a pond. By 1959, the dike was completed as well as stone rip-rap installed.

In 2018, the park was improved by adding more picnic tables and a wheelchair accessible fishing platform. The project was paid for with a $100,000 grant from Governor Cuomo's Adventure New York Initiative.

== Fishing ==
Fish species present in the pond are rainbow trout, brown trout, goldfish, golden shiner, bluntnose minnow, fathead minnow, brown bullhead, pumpkinseed, largemouth bass. Basswood Pond is most popular for its trout fishing. The pond has been reclaimed numerous times due to illegal stocking of non-trout species. It is annually stocked with approximately 350 brown trout 8-15" in length and 100 rainbow trout 8-10" in length. Ice fishing is not allowed on the pond.
