= Edmeston (CDP), New York =

Edmeston, New York
- Census-designated place
- Location within the state of New York
- Coordinates: 42°41′52″N 75°14′38″W
- Country: United States
- State: New York
- County: Otsego
- Town: Edmeston

Area
  - Total: 4.34 sq mi (11.25 km^{2})
  - Land: 4.34 sq mi (11.25 km^{2})
  - Water: 0 sq mi (0.00 km^{2})
- Elevation: 1,210 ft (370 m)

Population (2020)
  - Total: 592
  - Density: 136.3/sq mi (52.61/km^{2})
- Time zone: UTC-5 (Eastern (EST))
  - Summer (DST): UTC-4 (EDT)
- Area code: 607
- FIPS code: 36-23602

Edmeston is a census-designated place (CDP) forming the central settlement of the town of Edmeston in Otsego County, New York, United States. The population of the CDP was 657 at the 2010 census.

== Geography ==
Edmeston is located at 42°41′52″N 75°14′38″W (42.69177, -75.25326).

According to the United States Census Bureau, the CDP has a total area of 4.4 square miles (11.3 km^{2}), all land.

== Demographics ==
Historical population
Census	Pop.	Note	%±
2020	592		—
U.S. Decennial Census
