= Hooker Mountain =

Mountain in New York, United States

- Location within New York Location within the United States

Highest point
- Elevation: 2,310 feet (700 m)
- Coordinates: 42°35′53″N 74°51′35″W

Geography
- Location: Schenevus, New York, U.S.
- Topo map: USGS Schenevus

Hooker Mountain is a 2,310-foot-tall (700 m) mountain in the Central New York region of New York. It is located in Otsego County northwest of the hamlet of Schenevus. In 1935, a 79-foot-6-inch-tall (24.23 m) fire tower was installed on the mountain by the Civilian Conservation Corps. The tower ceased operations at the end of 1970, and later sold and removed in 1975.

== History ==
In 1935, the Civilian Conservation Corps built a 79-foot-6-inch-tall (24.23 m) International Derrick tower that was provided to the state by the United States Forest Service. The tower was first used in 1936, and reported three fires. The tower was staffed until the use of aerial detection caused the closing at the end of the 1970. The tower was sold in 1975 for $490 and later removed. In November 2001, the person who purchased the tower, transferred it to Martin Podskoch, an author of three books on New York State Fire Towers. Martin Podskoch later moved to Connecticut, and the tower is now owned by the Town of Speculator. The town has not yet found a place to rebuild the tower.

A century ago Hooker Mountain was argued as one of the highest points in Otsego County, a title now held by Lutheranville Hill near East Worcester.
