= Edmeston, New York =

- Town
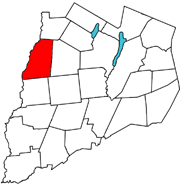
- Edmeston, Otsego County
- Coordinates: 42°43′N 75°15′W
- Country: United States
- State: New York
- County: Otsego

Area
  - Total: 44.38 sq mi (114.95 km^{2})
  - Land: 44.30 sq mi (114.74 km^{2})
  - Water: 0.081 sq mi (0.21 km^{2})
- Elevation: 1,430 ft (436 m)

Population (2010)
  - Total: 1,826
  - Estimate (2018): 1,744
  - Density: 39.4/sq mi (15.21/km^{2})
- Time zone: UTC-5 (Eastern (EST))
  - Summer (DST): UTC-4 (EDT)
- ZIP code: 13335
- Area code: 607
- FIPS code: 36-23613
- GNIS feature ID: 0978926
- Website: townofesmeston.com

Edmeston is a town located in Otsego County, New York, United States. As of the 2010 census, the town had a total population of 1,826.

The Town of Edmeston is at the western county line. Edmeston is also the name of the largest hamlet in the town. The town is south of Utica.

== Geography ==
According to the United States Census Bureau, the town has a total area of 44.6 square miles (116 km^{2}), of which 44.5 square miles (115 km^{2}) is land and 0.1 square miles (0.26 km^{2}) is water. The total area is 0.11% water. The major water features are:

- The Unadilla River, which forms the entire western border of the town,
- Wharton Creek, which meanders to the south and west through the southeastern corner of the town,
- Mill Creek, which flows from north to south from the northern border of Edmeston to the Wharton Creek at the Edmeston hamlet.
- Summit Lake in the northeastern corner of the town.

The elevation of the town varies by approximately 800 feet (240 m): from just under 1,100 feet (340 m) above sea level at the Unadilla River in the southwestern corner of the town, to just over 1,900 feet (580 m) at peaks near Taylor Hill and Summit Lake in the northeastern corner.

New York State Route 80 passes through the southeastern part of the town.

== History ==
The town of Edmeston, in Otsego County, extends to the west as far as the Unadilla River, a line that was established by the 1768 Treaty of Fort Stanwix between the British and the Iroquois, negotiated by Sir William Johnson. The town's name came from the brothers, Robert and William Edmeston, who had been granted 10,000 acres (40 km^{2}) of land in what is now the northwest corner of the town. The hamlets of West Edmeston and South Edmeston are situated in the Unadilla Valley, while the hamlet of Edmeston lies in the Wharton Valley. Earlier settlers came from New England; for most of the settlers, it was planned as a stopover on their way west. A strong Baptist influence came with the settlers. Universalists, Methodists and Roman Catholics soon arrived.

The town was established from the Town of Burlington in 1808.

Dairy farming has historically been the main business of the area. Cheese factories, creameries, livery stables, blacksmith shops, and tanneries were created to support the dairy industry. One room schoolhouses were scattered throughout the town. By damming the creeks, power was created for foundries and mills. Hop growing and maple syrup production were seasonal occupations. Each of the town's communities developed business districts and became self-sufficient.

The last spike of the Edmeston branch of the New York, Ontario & Western Railroad from New Berlin was driven at Edmeston in January 1889, but a rumored extension to Richfield Springs was never built. Then cars, buses and trucks arrived on the scene. The branch line was sold to the Unadilla Valley Railway in 1941 which operated it until abandonment in 1960.

Dams were washed out and electricity became available. The hamlets evolved into bedroom communities. The one room schoolhouses closed and the Central School was developed in the hamlet of Edmeston.

Today residents go in all four directions for employment. NYCM Insurance not only provides positions for many of the locals but also for hundreds that commute into the community each day. On the eastern side of the town is the Pathfinder Village (home for Down syndrome residents) that provides more employment.

The population of the town has not increased much through the years. It still remains largely rural. Organizations like the local Rotary Club, American Legion and Fire and Emergency Squads have active volunteers that provide community needs in lieu of governments in the hamlets. Edmeston Central School is the center of activities.

== Demographics ==
Historical population
Census	Pop.	Note	%±
1820	1,841		—
1830	2,087		13.4%
1840	1,907		−8.6%
1850	1,885		−1.2%
1860	1,804		−4.3%
1870	1,744		−3.3%
1880	1,794		2.9%
1890	1,703		−5.1%
1900	1,767		3.8%
1910	1,567		−11.3%
1920	1,553		−0.9%
1930	1,556		0.2%
1940	1,580		1.5%
1950	1,563		−1.1%
1960	1,721		10.1%
1970	1,709		−0.7%
1980	1,732		1.3%
1990	1,717		−0.9%
2000	1,824		6.2%
2010	1,826		0.1%
2016 (est.)	1,745	▼	−4.4%
U.S. Decennial Census

As of the census of 2000, the town of Edmeston contained:

- 1824 people,
- 658 households, and
- 480 families.

The population density was 40.9 inhabitants per square mile (15.8/km^{2}).

There were 821 housing units at an average density of 18.4 per square mile (7.1/km^{2}).

The racial makeup of the town was:

- 98.14% White
- 0.44% African American
- 0.27% Native American
- 0.05% Asian
- 0.00% Pacific Islander
- 0.44% of races other than the above
- 0.66% of two or more races
- 0.99% Hispanic or Latino of any race

There were 658 households, out of which:

- 34.2% had children under the age of 18 living with them.
- 62.2% were married couples living together.
- 8.1% had a female householder with no husband present.
- 26.9% were non-families.
- 22.5% of all households were made up of individuals.
- 12.2% had someone living alone who was 65 years of age or older.
- The average household size was 2.65.
- the average family size was 3.06.

The spread of the population of Edmeston was:

- 27.1% under the age of 18
- 6.3% from 18 to 24
- 28.6% from 25 to 44
- 23.5% from 45 to 64
- 14.5% who were 65 years of age or older

Edmeston population distribution (2000 Census)

Age	Total	% *	Male	% **	Female	%**
All	1824	100.0	912	50.0	912	50.0
18+	1330	72.9	657	36.0	673	36.9
21+	1282	70.3	-	-	-	-
60+	352	19.3	166	47.2	186	52.8
62+	324	17.8	-	-	-	-
65+	265	14.5	126	47.5	139	52.5
75+	118	6.5	49	41.5	69	58.5
85+	25	1.4	9	36.0	16	64.0

(*) percent of total population (all ages)
(**) percent of population in age bracket

The median age was 37 years.

For every 100 females, there were 100.0 males.
For every 100 females age 18 and over, there were 97.6 males.

In the town of Edmeston, median income:

- per household was $36,800,
- per family was $41,510,
- per male was $27,546,
- per female was $21,089.

The per capita income for the town was $17,507.

13.6% of the population and 8.3% of families were below the poverty line.

Out of the total people living in poverty,

- 18.3% of those under the age of 18 and
- 7.5% of those 65 and older were living below the poverty line.

== Communities and locations in Edmeston ==
- Amblers Crossing – A hamlet south of Edmeston village.
- Edmeston – The hamlet of Edmeston is in the southern part of the town on NY-80.
- Manchester Crossing – A hamlet east of South Edmeston.
- North Edmeston – A hamlet located north of Edmeston.
- South Edmeston – A hamlet at the western town line near the Unadilla River at the junction of County Roads 18 and 20.
- Summit Lake – A small lake in the northeastern part of the town.
- West Edmeston – A hamlet near the western town line, located next to the Unadilla River, partially in the Town of Brookfield.

== See also ==
- Edmeston Local, the town’s former newspaper
