= John Tunnicliff =

John Tunnicliff (c. 1725 – January, 1800) was a prominent landowner and presumed Tory in Otsego County, New York. He was born in Derbyshire, England, the eldest son of George and Mary Tunnicliff. He married Elizabeth in 1747 and later married Mary Woodhouse.

== Sports of the chase ==
In 1755, he was living in Derby, England, where he owned a large and valuable estate, with extensive forests in which were preserved a variety of game for the diversion of himself and numerous friends. Like nearly all his descendants, he was extremely fond of the sports of the chase; and on one occasion he pursued and shot a deer in the forest of an English nobleman, who prosecuted him for the offense. This circumstance, it is said, together with the onerous tax imposed by King George II on all gamesters, so incensed him that he at once resolved to emigrate to the American colonies, where he could be at liberty to enjoy the pleasures of the forest unrestrained by stringent laws or the caprice of titled nobility.

== First visit to the colonies ==
Accordingly, the following year he arrived in Philadelphia. Extensive tracts of public land had already been granted to individuals and companies by the English colonial government in the eastern part of the colony of New York, and Mr. Tunnicliff visited this portion of the state in search of land, with a view of making it a future home for his family. Proceeding westward from Albany, he at length reached Cherry Valley where he learned of the existence of a region of beautiful lakes and numerous mill-streams a few miles farther to the west. He was desirous of securing a location that would resemble, so far as possible in its topography, his estate in England, and amid the unlimited diversity before him, finally selected a tract of 12,000 acres (4,900 ha), about two miles (3.2 km) southwest of Canadarago Lake, in the patent just granted the same year to David Schuyler (landowner) and others. The lands of this purchase extended easterly to the stream known as "Fly creek," and the region of the headwaters of this stream are designated as the "Twelve Thousand" to the present day [c.1880]. Here he erected a home and commenced the work of clearing away the forest.

== Peculiar exigencies ==
Other adventurers had already occupied claims in the vicinity, and it doubtless required no small degree of fortitude and courage to endure the privations and dangers incident to frontier life; and especially when we take into consideration the peculiar exigencies of the times. The French and English nations were at this time contending for the mastery of the continent. England occupied the Atlantic slope, while Canada was in the possession of France, who were making vigorous efforts to control the western lakes and rivers south to the mouth of the Mississippi, and thus confine the English to the Atlantic coast. The French had vast hordes of Indian allies, who were constantly on the alert to perpetrate acts of hostility on their forest. Frontier settlements were frequently destroyed, and isolated cabins and unprotected families fell into the hands of the savages who burned their homes to the ground.

Mr. Tunnicliff had frequently been apprised of the danger that surrounded him, and resolved to leave until the close of the French and Indian War. His family treasures and belongings were buried in the forest, and he returned to his family in England. Soon after his departure, his estate buildings were burned by the Indians, and in consequence of this circumstance he remained in England several years, during which time he sold his estate there, bestowing, according to the English custom of primogeniture, a large portion of his property upon his eldest son, John, Jr., who had arrived at the years of manhood, and preferred to remain in the land of his birth. Mr. Tunnicliff had three sons and two daughters. The two younger sons were at this time lads of twelve and fourteen years, and the eldest daughter sixteen.

== Return to America ==
Mr. Tunnicliff was possessed of a large property, and occupied a high social position. At Liverpool he purchased a vessel fully manned, and with a considerable number of passengers on board (several families of which we shall have occasion to notice in this work), he sailed again for Philadelphia, where he arrived in the summer of 1758. An estate, previously purchased, on the banks of the Schuylkill, was now occupied by the family, where they remained until the year 1764, when they removed to Dutchess County, in the colony of New York. Although peace had been restored the year previous, Mrs. Tunnicliff refused to accompany her husband to his lands in Schuyler's patent. Accordingly, an estate was leased for five years at Skenesborough, New York, near Lake Champlain, where the family were located with the two sons, Joseph and William.

Mr. Tunnicliff returned to his former country estate, and found the ruins of his home that had been burned by the Indians. He at once caused new buildings to be erected, also a saw-mill on the stream nearby, that was kept incessantly at work to answer the requirements of the now growing settlement. His eldest daughter remained with her father at The Oaks as the estate was called, from the circumstance that a large portion of the lands in the purchase were thickly covered with gigantic oak trees. This name was subsequently given to the stream (Oaks Creek) that forms the outlet of Canadarago Lake, which it still retains. The "orchard" on this estate was the first in Otsego County. At this early day there were few or no roads in this section of the country, and traveling was done mostly on horseback or on foot.

In 1774, John Tunnicliff purchased 600 acres (240 ha) of land in the northern portion of Schuyler's patent, commencing near the mouth of Fish Creek, and running northerly to the present line of Herkimer County, New York. Before his death in 1800, Mr. Tunnicliff built an Episcopalian church near his residence, but it was destroyed by fire in 1840.

== Descendants ==
Tunnicliff's eldest daughter married Dr. Jones, of Brockville, Ontario, on the north bank of the St. Lawrence River. Their son, Hon. Dunham Jones, lived on the original estate of his father, and for many years held offices of distinction under the British government.

In 1783, John Tunnicliff, Jr., came to this country from England, and located at Albany, New York as a goldsmith, his former employment. He remained there but a few months when he purchased a farm about one mile (1.6 km) south of Little Lakes, in the town of Warren, New York which he continued to occupy until his death in 1814. His family consisted of seven sons and five daughters.

In 1916, descendant Lester Tunnicliff purchased the American Hotel (built in 1802) in nearby Cooperstown, New York and renamed it the Tunnicliff Inn. The establishment is still in operation under that name (as of 2017).

== Main source ==
- D. Hamilton Hurd The History of Otsego County, New York 1740-1878 Everts & Fariss, Philadelphia.
