= William Edmeston =

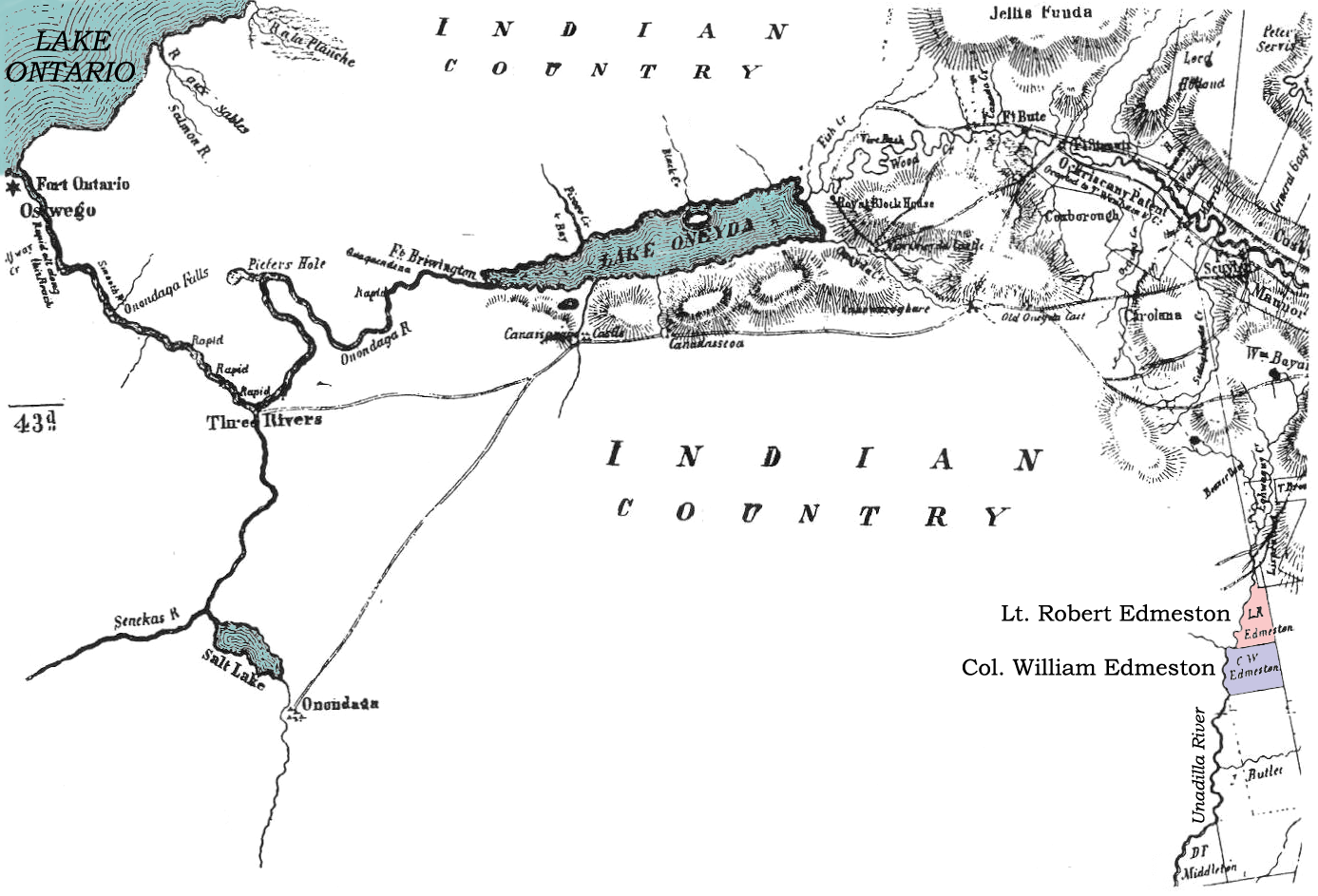
The patents of Robert and William Edmeston on the Central New York frontier, c. 1770.

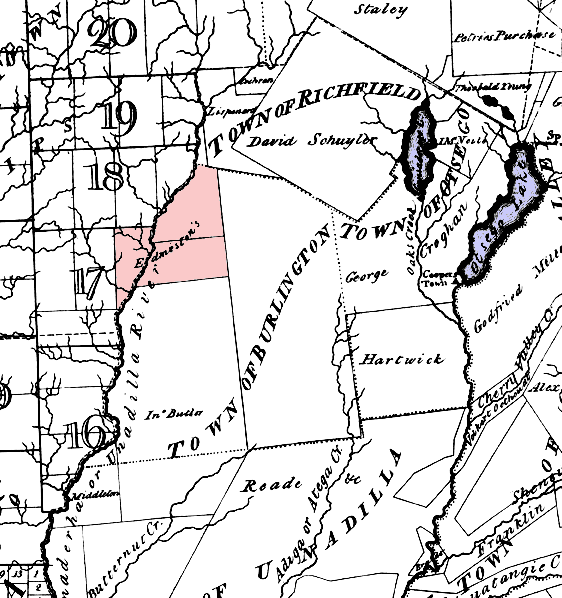
Possible location of Edmestons' expansion into the 20 Townships west of the Unadilla, c. 1792

General William Edmeston (died 1804) was a British Army officer who owned an estate in New York State.

As a captain in the 48th Regiment of Foot, he was posted to North America in 1755 with his brother, Lieutenant Robert Edmeston, to fight in the French and Indian War.

In 1763, by royal proclamation, the brothers were each awarded 5,000 acres (20 km^{2}) of land in the colonies for their military service. They attempted to establish their claims in what was then a disputed part of the New Hampshire Grants, now Vermont. However, in 1770 they decided to locate on the east bank of the Unadilla River in New York State just west of George Croghan's Otsego patent, in what is now the Town of Edmeston in Otsego County. They established their homes on the land, which became known as the Mount Edmeston Tracts. The transactions were facilitated by Percifer Carr, who had been a sergeant in the 48th with Edmeston and when the Edmeston brothers later returned to England, Carr would be employed as caretaker of their land.

When the American War of Independence broke out in 1775 Edmonston was arrested by the Americans and sent to Boston to be exchanged, after which he became Lieutenant-Colonel of the 48th Foot. He was captured by a French privateer in 1779, but he made his way to England the following year and spent the remainder of the war serving in Europe as a lieutenant-colonel, first with the 48th Foot but from 1782 to 1783 with the 50th Foot.

Between 1793 and 1796 he was the Colonel of the short-lived 95th Regiment of Foot and in 1802 he was appointed Colonel of the 1st Royal Veteran Battalion. He was promoted full general in 1803.

He died the following year and was buried at Hanwell, Middlesex on 3 July 1804.
