= Wharton Creek (Arkansas) =

Stream in Arkansas, U.S.

Coordinates: 36.0692427°N 93.6824128°W

Wharton Creek is a stream in the U.S. state of Arkansas.

A variant name was "Whorton Creek". The stream was named after Joshua Whorton, a pioneer settler.
