= Burlington Flats, New York =

Hamlet in New York, United States

Burlington Flats is a hamlet (and census-designated place) in the Town of Burlington in Otsego County, New York, United States. It is located at coordinates 42.7452°N 75.183°W. As of the 2020 census, Burlington Flats had a population of 143.

== Notable person ==
- Baseball Hall of Famer William Hulbert was born in Burlington Flats.
