= South Edmeston, New York =

- Hamlet and CDP
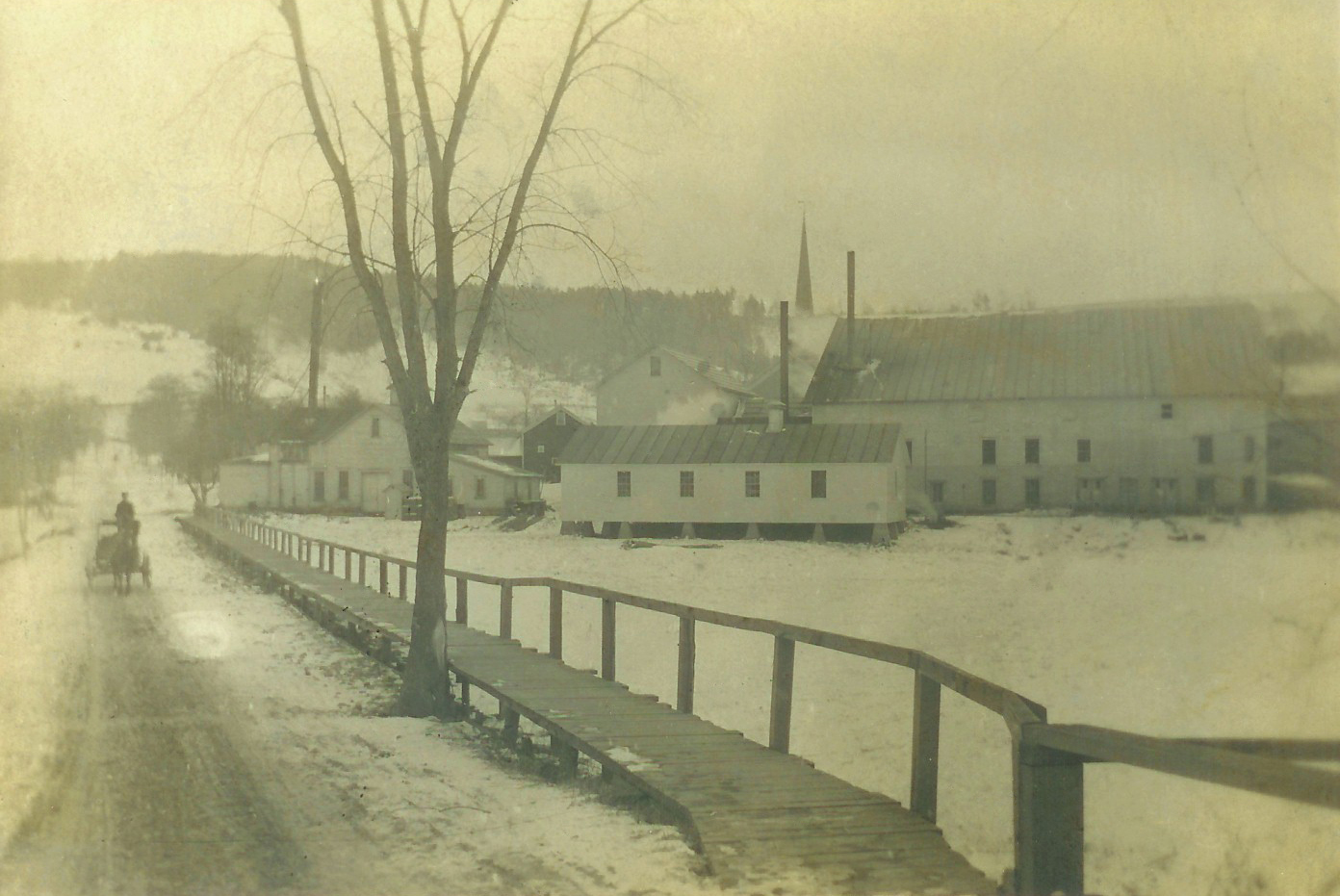
- South Edmeston Cheese Factory
- Interactive map of South Edmeston, New York
- Coordinates: 42°41′03″N 75°19′04″W
- Country: United States
- State: New York
- County: Otsego
- Town: Edmeston

Area
  - Total: 0.93 sq mi (2.42 km^{2})
- Elevation: 1,119 ft (341 m)
- Time zone: UTC-5 (Eastern (EST))
  - Summer (DST): UTC-4 (EDT)
- ZIP code: 13335
- Area code: 607

South Edmeston is a hamlet (and census-designated place) on the Unadilla River in the Town of Edmeston in Otsego County, New York, United States. As of the 2020 census, South Edmeston had a population of 137.

This area had been a center of dairy farming and cheese production since the nineteenth century. Kraft Foods had operated a cheese plant in South Edmeston starting in the year 1920. They originally produced Philadelphia brand cream cheese. Later they switched over to Breyers yogurt, and the plant employed about 55 workers.

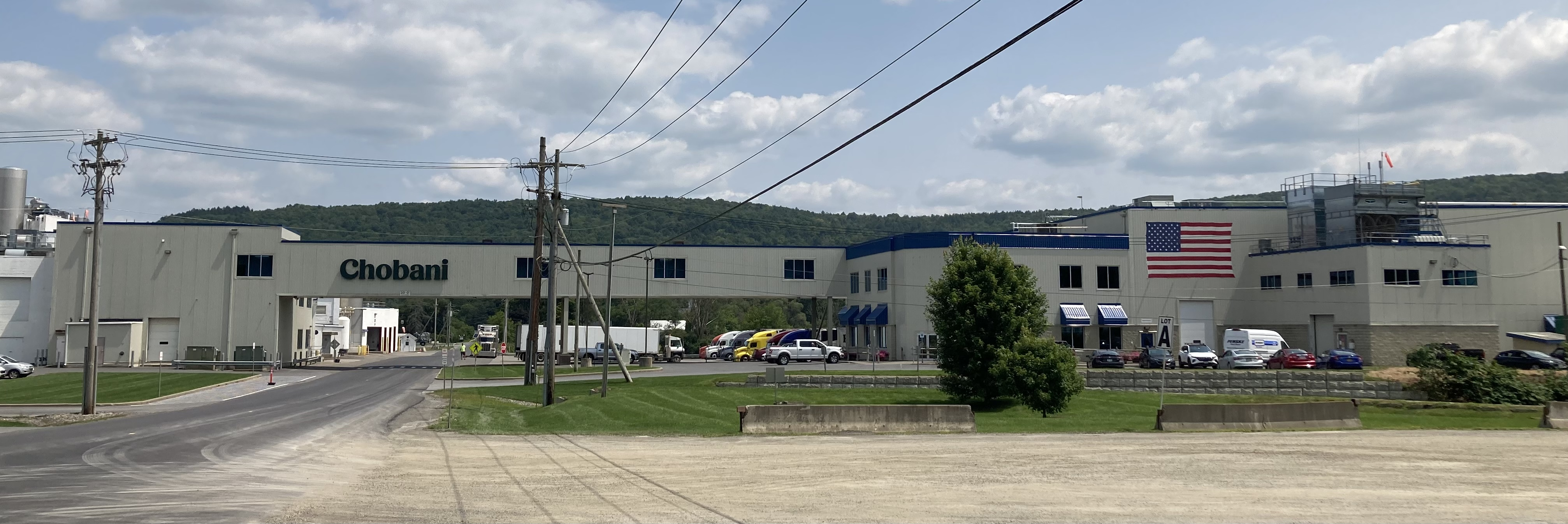
The Chobani yogurt plant near South Edmeston

In December 2004, Kraft announced that the plant would close on April 8, 2005. Following its closure, the plant was bought by the company Agro Farma under Turkish entrepreneur Hamdi Ulukaya. In 2007, it launched the Chobani brand of Greek yogurt. Thanks to the surge in popularity of Greek yogurt, as of 2011, the company employs 600 workers at its South Edmeston headquarters and production facility, and continues to expand.
