= Oaks Creek =

River in New York State

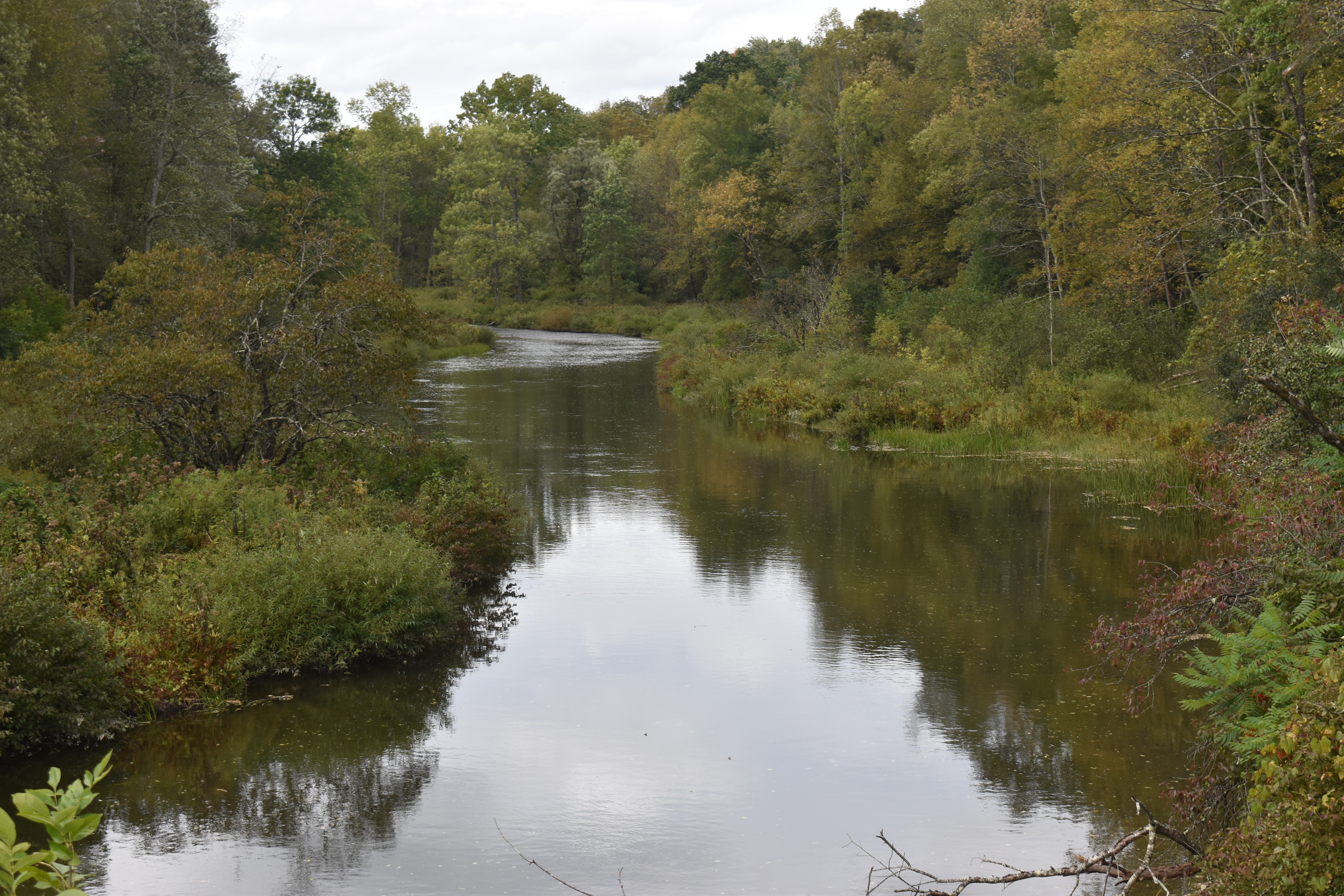
- Oaks Creek upstream of Allison Road
- Oaks Creek highlighted in blue
- Location of the mouth of Oaks Creek Oaks Creek (the United States)

Location
- Country: United States
- State: New York
- Region: Central New York
- County: Otsego
- Towns: Otsego, Hartwick, Exeter

Physical characteristics
- Source: Canadarago Lake
  - location: Schuyler Lake
  - coordinates: 42°47′31″N 75°00′57″W
  - elevation: 1,266 ft (386 m)
- Mouth: Susquehanna River
  - location: Index
  - coordinates: 42°39′43″N 74°57′02″W
  - elevation: 1,161 ft (354 m)
- Length: 9.32 mi (15.00 km)
- Basin size: 102 sq mi (260 km^{2})
- Discharge
  - location: Index (1929-1995)
  - average: 147 cu ft/s (4.2 m^{3}/s)
  - minimum: 1.4 cu ft/s (0.040 m^{3}/s)
  - maximum: 2,280 cu ft/s (65 m^{3}/s)

Basin features
- Progression: Oaks Creek → Susquehanna River → Chesapeake Bay → Atlantic Ocean
- Tributaries
  - left: Fly Creek
  - right: Lidell Creek, Phinney Creek

Oaks Creek is a river that drains Canadarago Lake, which is situated in the north central region of Otsego County, New York. The creek begins by the Hamlet of Schuyler Lake and flows southeast approximately 9.32 miles (15.00 km), dropping only 105 feet (32 m) in elevation, before converging with the Susquehanna River south of the Village of Cooperstown, by the Hamlet of Index. From the source to Oaksville the creek flows along Panther Mountain. Fly Creek is a main tributary, that converges with Oaks Creek south of the Hamlet of Fly Creek.

In 1779 it was referred to as "O-at'-tis" as the Iroquois name.

== Course ==
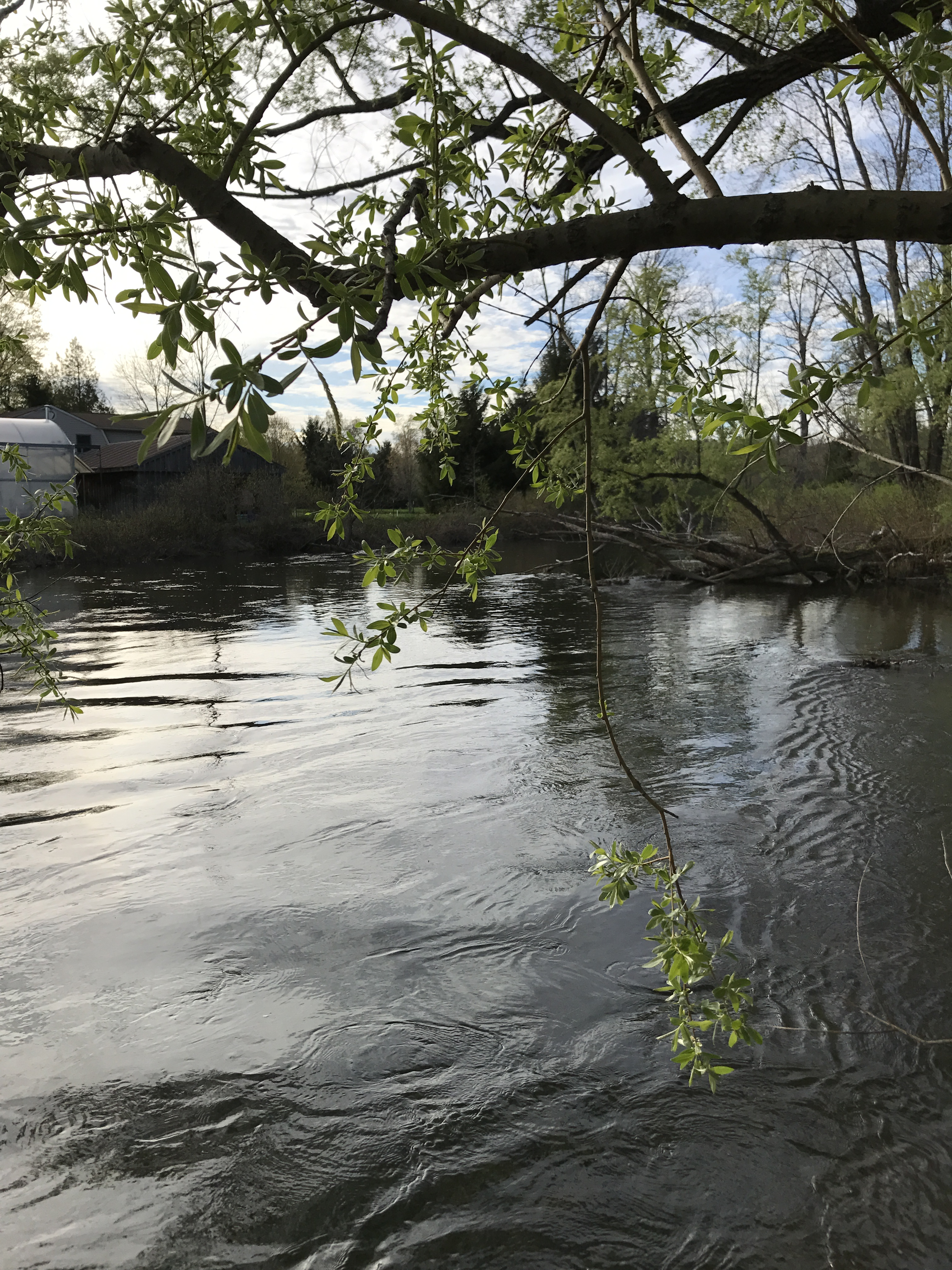
Oaks creek looking north in Oaksville

Oaks Creek begins at the outlet of Canadarago Lake close to where the Herkimer Creek enters the lake. It starts flowing southward for a short distance before flowing under County Route 22 then reaching the Panther Mountain Dam which was the old trolly line bridge. After the dam it continues meandering southward, receiving Lidell Creek and Phinney Creek from the right, as well as a few unnamed tributaries draining Panther Mountain. Then a short distance after the confluence of Phinney Creek it passes the Parslow Road Conservation Area and then reaches the Hamlet of Cattown. In Cattown the creek splits and forms a small island that Cat Town Road passes over. At Cattown the creek starts flowing more southeastward and heads toward the Hamlet of Oaksville and crosses under State Route 28 and State Route 80 and then the former location of the trolley bridge. After the former trolley bridge it crosses under Road then reaches the confluence of Fly Creek. After the confluence the creek travels for a short distance before reaching the Hamlet of Toddsville where it curves to the southwest and crosses under County Route 59 and then Lower Toddsville Road. After Lower Toddsville Road it continues southwestward and passes Greenough Road Conservation Area and shortly after curves to the east. After the curve to the east it soon reaches the old dam and trolley bridge and then crosses under State Route 28 again in the Hamlet of Index. Shortly after Index it curves to the southeast for a short distance before reaching the mouth at Susquehanna River.

== History ==
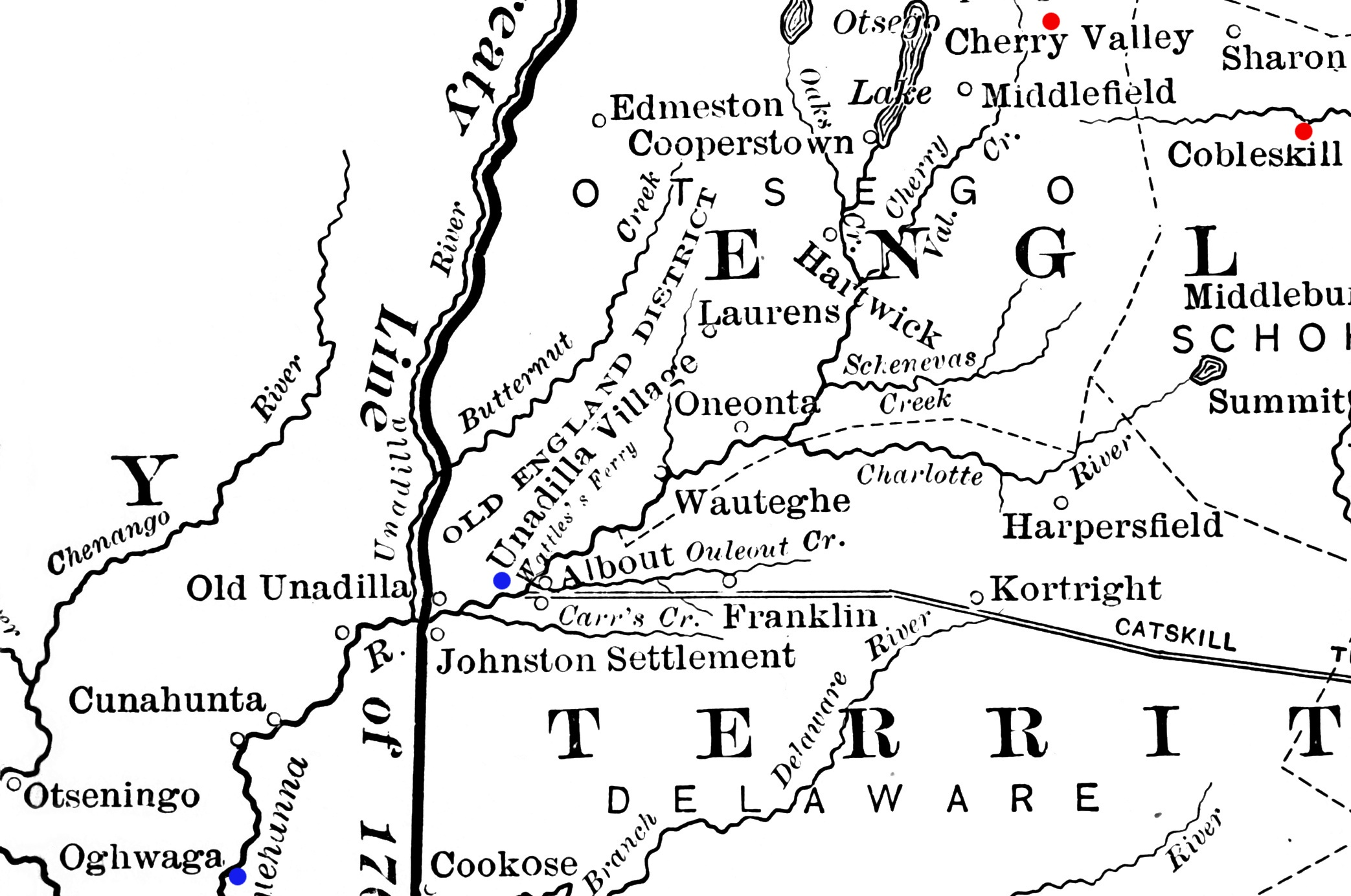
Map detail showing the western frontier of New York including Oaks Creek

Major John Tunnicliff located in the southeast corner of the Town of Exeter. The Tunnicliff farm was named "The Oaks" due to the many oak trees on the estate. Oaks Creek was later named after this place. The first fruit orchard planted in the county was on the farm.

In 1786, Samuel Tubbs from Bennington County, Vermont, bought 1,565 acres from William Cooper. On the parts he didn't sell, at the area of present day Toddsville, he built a grist and saw mill. The mill dam was constructed just as the stream descended into the ravine, which allowed a shorter less expensive dam to be built. Tubbs died in 1805, and at that time the Todd family bought his property. The Todd family were millwrights, originally from Connecticut. Todd added the Otsego Paper Works at the upper end of the hamlet. In 1809, Lemuel and Jehiel Todd along with three others constructed the Union Cotton Mill at the lower mill. By 1810, bridges had been constructed near the upper and lower mills to better access each side of the creek.

Then in March, 1798, David Marvin had completed a mill at the base of Christian Hill on the east bank of Oaks Creek, south of Oaksville. Then a few weeks later, the mill was offered for sale. The Marvins then sold to White and Osgood the privilege of ground in return for setting up a Fulling mill, a dye-house, and a shop. White and Osgood announced that the clothing mill was complete by September 1796, which was later sold to Eliphalet Williams in 1800.

In 1797, George Johnson built a saw and grist mill in Cattown, which was on the earliest main road running west from Cooperstown. But by 1810, a new turnpike was complete from Cooperstown to Oaksville, which became the main route. By 1824, Johnson also had a clothing works, which he later sold to Leander Plumb. William Fairchild and Josiah Stephens had built a grist mill near the new turnpike where it crossed Oaks Creek by 1812.

Russell Williams built a cotton mill on the creek in the Hamlet of Oaksville in 1830. Eliphalet Williams had a cloth and carding machine on the creek. In the early 1800s, local carding mills purchased cards manufactured on the west bank the creek opposite Marvin’s Mill called the stone mill.

After the end of the War of 1812, the wire works could not compete with cheaper British goods and went out of business. By 1819, Russell Williams, Lyman Foster, Shadrack Steel, and B. Carr were producing paper at the stone mill. The paper production ceased by 1838, and was replaced with a grist mill by Edwin Spafard. Spafard's mill was sold several more times over the next few years, and then by 1878, butt-factory, which were large capacity barrels. After the Civil War, rural mills lost economic ground to larger factories, which could take advantage of cheap labor and corporate investment. Mills along the creek disappeared by the early 1900s.

David Shipman, the "Leatherstocking" and "Deerslayer" of James Fenimore Cooper’s novels, was a resident of Town of Otsego living in a log cabin on the east bank of Oaks Creek between Toddsville and the confluence of Fly Creek.

== Geology ==
In 2009, a hydrologic survey of Oaks Creek was performed. It showed there is a gradual increase in streambed elevation between the dam and the confluence with Lidell and Phinney Creeks. This causes a backup of water that limits outflow of the lake and reduces the effectiveness of the existing spillway. In 2011 a study found that dredging of the creek downstream of the dam, was found to be non-beneficial to creek flow. The study also found that a large amount of dredging would be required to create the proper slope necessary to benefit the drainage time of the lake. It was ultimately decided that dredging could cause significant impacts on the creek and be too costly.

== Hydrology ==
=== Discharge ===
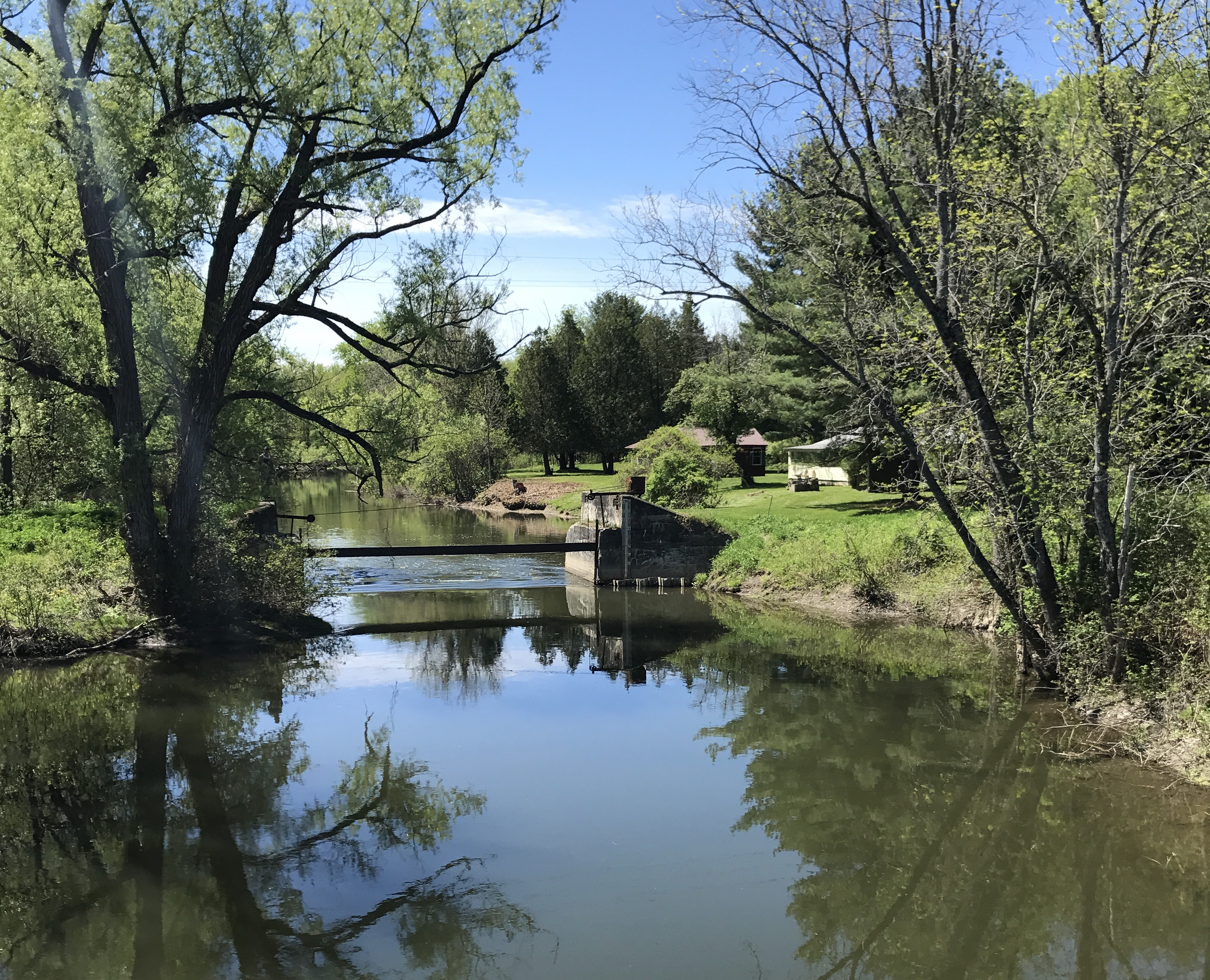
Oaks Creek near source, looking south at dam.

The United States Geological Survey (USGS) formally maintained a stream gauge along Oaks Creek. It was in operation from 1929 to 1995 and was located in the Hamlet of Index. During this period it had an average discharge of 147 cubic feet per second (4.2 m^{3}/s), a maximum discharge of 2,280 cubic feet per second (65 m^{3}/s) and had minimum discharge of 1.4 cubic feet per second (0.040 m^{3}/s). The USGS also did non-daily field measurements, at random intervals, of the creek by the Hamlet of Schuyler Lake between 1963 and 1974. The highest measured discharge of 864 cubic feet per second (24.5 m^{3}/s) on September 13, 1974 and had minimum discharge of 1.68 cubic feet per second (0.048 m^{3}/s) on September 8, 1970.

=== Water quality ===
In 2008, a biological survey was performed in Index, where the creek passes under Route 28. Samples showed slightly impacted conditions, due to natural conditions. However, there were found to be no effect on fauna, and water quality is considered good. The results were consistent with a survey performed at the same location in 1997. Aquatic life was found to be fully supported, with no other impacts to recreational activities. DEC rates the water quality of the stream as Class C, suitable for fishing and non-contact human recreation. The agency also adds a "(T)", which means its suitable for trout populations.

== Recreation ==
In spring 2019, and years in the past, the DEC stocked 1,420 8-to-9-inch-long (20 to 23 cm) and 100 12-to-15-inch-long (30 to 38 cm) brown trout into the creek in the Town of Hartwick. Other fish species present in the creek are brook trout and rainbow trout.

The Oaks Creek Conservation Area, opened August 2010, is located off State Route 28 by the Hamlet of Schuyler Lake along the creek. It runs for .5 miles (0.80 km) along the creek and provides access for fishing. It is currently only accessed by kayak or canoe. Another opened April 2012, the Parslow Road Conservation Area, located on Parslow Road in the Town of Otsego. It is 86 acres (0.134 mi^{2}) in size and runs .5 miles (0.80 km) along the creek. There is a 900-foot-long (270 m) trail that leads from the parking lot leading to the creek for fishing, kayaking and canoeing access. The Greenough Road Conservation Area, opened March 2011, is located on Greenough Road in the Town of Hartwick. It is open for fishing and paddling with a 375-foot-long (114 m) trail leading to the creek. The last area, opened August 2008, is the Compton Bridge Conservation Area. It is located at the mouth of the creek and is open for hiking, fishing and canoeing via a short trail from the parking lot to the creek.

== See also ==
- List of rivers of New York
