= List of places in New York: T =

This list of current cities, towns, unincorporated communities, counties, and other recognized places in the U.S. state of New York also includes information on the number and names of counties in which the place lies, and its lower and upper zip code bounds, if applicable.

List of places in New York: A | B | C | D | E | F | G | H | I | J | K | L | M | N | O | P | Q | R | S | T | U | V | W | X | Y | Z

Name of place	Counties	Principal county	Lower zip code	Upper zip code
Tabasco	1	Ulster County		
Taberg	1	Oneida County	13471	
Tabor Corners	1	Livingston County	14572	
Taborton	1	Rensselaer County	12153	
Tacoma	1	Delaware County		
Taconic Lake	1	Rensselaer County	12138	
Taghkanic	1	Columbia County	12502	
Taghkanic	1	Columbia County		
Tahawus	1	Essex County	12879	
Talcottville	1	Lewis County	13309	
Talcville	1	St. Lawrence County	13635	
Tallette	1	Chenango County		
Tallman	1	Rockland County	10982	
Tallmans	1	Rockland County		
Tamarack	1	Rensselaer County		
Tannersville	1	Greene County	12485	
Tappan	1	Rockland County	10983	
Tarrytown	1	Albany County		
Tarrytown	1	Westchester County	10591	
Tarrytown Heights	1	Westchester County	10591	
Taughannock Falls	1	Tompkins County		
Taunton	1	Onondaga County	13219	
Taylor	1	Cortland County	13040	
Taylor	1	Cortland County		
Taylor	1	Livingston County		
Taylor Center	1	Cortland County		
Taylor Hollow	1	Erie County		
Taylor Settlement	1	Jefferson County	13605	
Taylorshire	1	Erie County	14052	
Taylortown	1	Otsego County		
Taylor Valley	1	Cortland County		
Teall	1	Onondaga County	13217	
Teall Beach	1	Seneca County		
Teboville	1	Franklin County	12953	
Teed Corners	1	Livingston County		
Tenantville	1	Saratoga County		
Ten Mile River	1	Sullivan County	12764	
Tennanah	1	Sullivan County	12776	
Tennanah Lake	1	Sullivan County	12776	
Terminal	1	Richmond County	10301	
Terpening Corners	1	Tompkins County		
Terrace Heights	1	Queens County		
Terrace Park	1	St. Lawrence County	13669	
Terrys Corners	1	Niagara County	14067	
Terryville	1	Suffolk County	11776	
Texaco Town	1	Genesee County		
Texas	1	Lewis County		
Texas	1	Oswego County	13114	
Texas Valley	1	Cortland County	13803	
Thayer Corners	1	Franklin County	12917	
The Bridges	1	Orleans County	14477	
The Cape	1	Ulster County		
The Corner	1	Ulster County		
The Creek Beach	1	Suffolk County		
The Elms	1	Oswego County		
The Forge	1	Franklin County	12920	
The Forks	1	Cattaraugus County	14030	
The Glen	1	Warren County	12885	
The Landing	1	Suffolk County		
The Narrows	1	Cattaraugus County	14737	
Thendara	1	Herkimer County	13472	
Theodore Roosevelt Birthplace National Historic Site	1	New York County	10003	
Theodore Roosevelt Inaugural National Historic Site	1	Erie County	14209	
The Plains	1	Washington County	12816	
Theresa	1	Jefferson County	13691	
Theresa	1	Jefferson County		
The Springs	1	Suffolk County	11937	
The Terrace	1	Nassau County	11050	
The Vly	1	Ulster County	12484	
Thiells	1	Rockland County	10984	
Thomas Settlement	1	Jefferson County	13605	
Thomaston	1	Nassau County	11021	
Thomasville	1	Clinton County		
Thompson	2	Ontario County	14489	
Thompson	2	Seneca County	14489	
Thompson	1	Sullivan County		
Thompson Ridge	1	Orange County	10985	
Thompsons Lake	1	Albany County	12009	
Thompsonville	1	Sullivan County	12784	
Thomson	1	Washington County	12834	
Thorn Hill	1	Onondaga County		
Thornton	1	Chautauqua County	14723	
Thornton Grove	1	Onondaga County	13152	
Thornton Heights	1	Onondaga County	13152	
Thornwood	1	Westchester County	10594	
Thousand Island Park	1	Jefferson County	13692	
Three Mile Bay	1	Jefferson County	13693	
Three Rivers	1	Onondaga County	13041	
Throggs Neck	1	Bronx County	10465	
Throop	1	Cayuga County	13021	
Throop	1	Cayuga County		
Throopsville	1	Cayuga County	13021	
Thurman	1	Warren County	12885	
Thurston	1	Steuben County	14821	
Thurston	1	Steuben County		
Thurston Road	1	Monroe County	14619	
Tiana	1	Suffolk County	11946	
Tiana Shores	1	Suffolk County	11942	
Ticonderoga	1	Essex County	12883	
Tillson	1	Ulster County	12486	
Tilly Foster	1	Putnam County		
Times Plaza	1	Kings County	11217	
Times Square	1	New York County	10036	
Timothy Heights	1	Dutchess County	12569	
Tinkertown	1	Allegany County	14803	
Tioga	1	Tioga County		
Tioga Center	1	Tioga County	13845	
Tioga Terrace	1	Tioga County	13732	
Tiona	1	Broome County	13811	
Tiplady	1	Washington County		
Tip Top	1	Allegany County		
Titanium Mine And Plant	1	Essex County		
Titusville	1	Dutchess County		
Tivoli	1	Dutchess County	12583	
Toad Harbor	1	Oswego County		
Toddsville	1	Otsego County	13326	
Toddville	1	Westchester County	10566	
Todt Hill	1	Richmond County	10301	
Toggletown	1	Livingston County		
Toll Gate Corner	1	Cattaraugus County	14770	
Toll Gate Corners	1	Cayuga County		
Tomantown	1	Fulton County		
Tomhannock	1	Rensselaer County	12185	
Tomkins Cove	1	Rockland County	10986	
Tomlinson Corners	1	Monroe County	14506	
Tompkins	1	Delaware County		
Tompkins Corners	1	Chemung County	14845	
Tompkins Corners	1	Putnam County	10579	
Tompkins Corners	1	Westchester County		
Tompkins County Airport	1	Tompkins County	14850	
Tompkins Square	1	New York County	10009	
Tompkinsville	1	Richmond County	10301	
Tonawanda	1	Erie County	14150	
Tonawanda	1	Erie County		
Tonawanda	1	Erie County		
Tonawanda Indian Reservation	3	Erie County	14024	
Tonawanda Indian Reservation	3	Genesee County	14024	
Tonawanda Indian Reservation	3	Niagara County	14024	
Tonawanda Indian Reservation	1	Erie County	14024	
Tonawanda Indian Reservation	1	Genesee County	14204	
Tonawanda Indian Reservation	1	Niagara County	14204	
Tonawanda Junction	1	Erie County	14223	
Tonetta Lake Heights	1	Putnam County	10509	
Torrey	1	Yates County		
Tottenville	1	Richmond County	10307	
Tower Hill	1	Richmond County		
Towers Corners	1	Niagara County		
Towerville	1	Chautauqua County		
Towerville Corners	1	Chautauqua County	14701	
Towlesville	1	Steuben County	14810	
Town	1	Orange County	12550	
Towners	1	Putnam County	12531	
Town Line	1	Erie County	14004	
Town Line Station	1	Erie County		
Town of Tonawanda	1	Erie County	14223	
Town Pump	1	Monroe County	14559	
Townsend	1	Schuyler County	14891	
Townsendville	1	Seneca County	14847	
Toziers Corner	1	Wyoming County		
Tracy Creek	1	Broome County	13850	
Trainsmeadow	1	Queens County	11370	
Transit	1	Erie County		
Transitown	1	Erie County	14221	
Travers Corners	1	Saratoga County		
Travis	1	Richmond County	10301	
Treadwell	1	Delaware County	13846	
Tremont	1	Bronx County	10457	
Trenton	1	Oneida County		
Trenton	1	Oneida County		
Trenton Assembly Park	1	Oneida County	13304	
Trenton Falls	1	Oneida County	13304	
Tressmar	1	Monroe County		
Triangle	1	Broome County	13778	
Triangle	1	Broome County		
Triangle Lake	1	Albany County	12122	
Tribes Hill	1	Montgomery County	12177	
Triborough	1	New York County	10035	
Trionda	1	Washington County		
Tripoli	1	Cortland County	13050	
Tripoli	1	Washington County	12827	
Tristates	1	Orange County		
Troupsburg	1	Steuben County	14885	
Troupsburg	1	Steuben County		
Troutburg	1	Monroe County		
Trout Creek	1	Delaware County	13847	
Trout River	1	Franklin County	12926	
Troy	1	Rensselaer County	12180	83
Trudeau	1	Essex County		
Truesdale Lake	1	Westchester County	10590	
Trumansburg	1	Tompkins County	14886	
Trumbull Corners	1	Tompkins County	14867	
Truthville	1	Washington County	12832	
Truxton	1	Cortland County	13158	
Truxton	1	Cortland County		
Tryons Corners	1	Livingston County		
Tuckahoe	1	Suffolk County	11968	
Tuckahoe	1	Westchester County	10707	
Tucker Heights	1	Saratoga County	12019	
Tuckers Corner	1	Ulster County		
Tucker Terrace	1	St. Lawrence County	13662	
Tudor	1	New York County	10017	
Tully (town)	1	Onondaga County	13159	
Tully (village)	1	Onondaga County		
Tully Center	1	Onondaga County		
Tully Lake Park	1	Onondaga County		
Tully Valley	1	Onondaga County	13159	
Tunnel	1	Broome County	13848	
Tupper Lake	1	Franklin County	12986	
Tupper Lake	1	Franklin County		
Turin	1	Lewis County	13473	
Turin	1	Lewis County		
Turnwood	1	Ulster County	12758	
Tuscan	1	Otsego County	12197	
Tuscarora	1	Livingston County	14510	
Tuscarora	1	Steuben County		
Tuscarora Indian Reservation	1	Niagara County	14094	
Tusten	1	Sullivan County		
Tusten	1	Sullivan County		
Tuthill	1	Ulster County	12525	
Tuthilltown	1	Ulster County	12525	
Tuxedo	1	Orange County		
Tuxedo	1	Orange County		
Tuxedo Park	1	Livingston County		
Tuxedo Park	1	Orange County	10987	
Twelve Corners	1	Monroe County	14618	
Twilight Park	1	Greene County	12436	
Twin Lakes Village	1	Westchester County	10590	
Twin Orchard	1	Broome County	13850	
Two Brooks	1	Franklin County		
Tylertown	1	Sullivan County		
Tylerville	1	Jefferson County		
Tyner	1	Chenango County	13830	
Tyre	1	Seneca County	13148	
Tyre	1	Seneca County		
Tyrone	1	Schuyler County	14887	
Tyrone	1	Schuyler County		
