= Rum Hill =

Mountain located in New York State

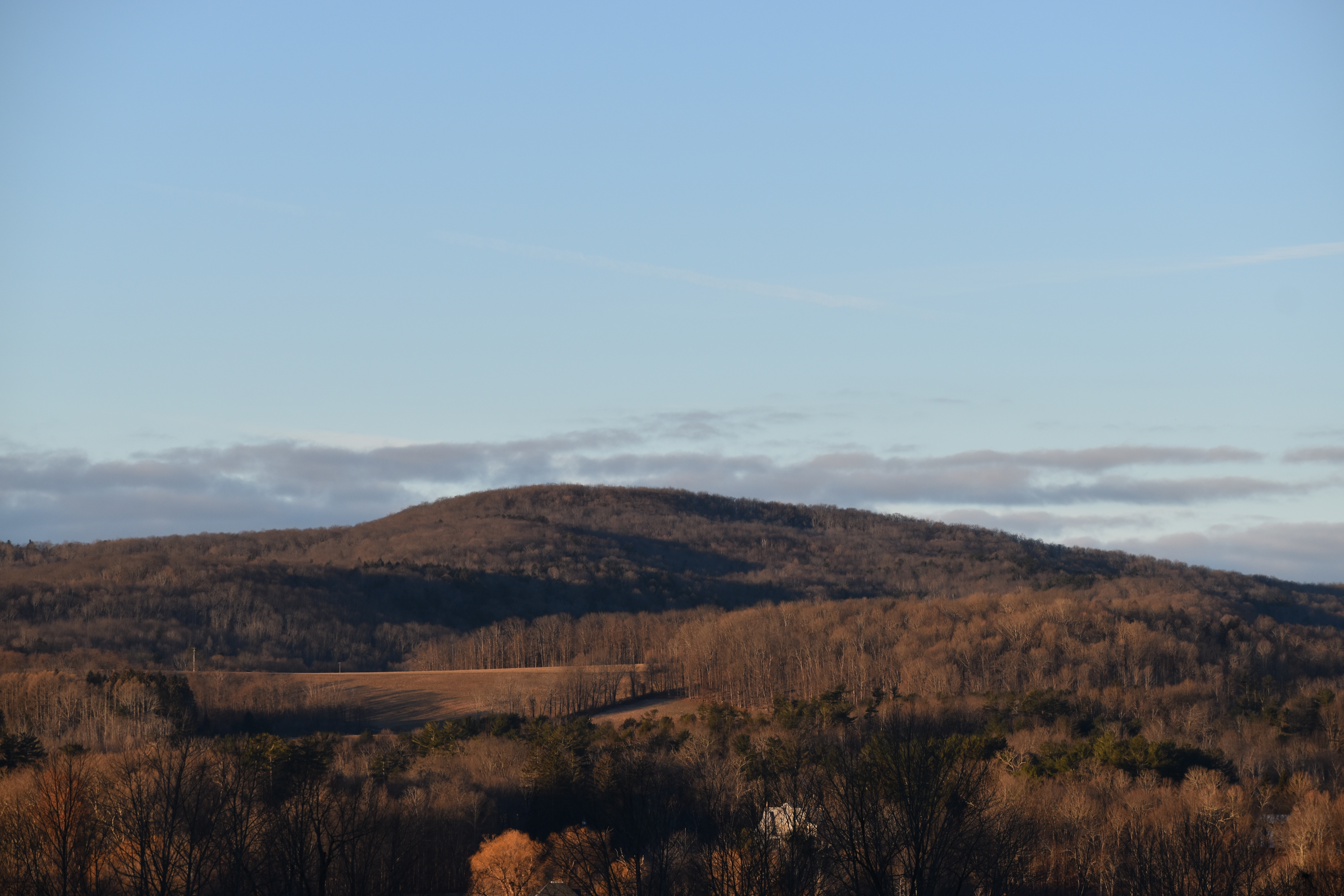
- View of Rum Hill from December 2021

Highest point
- Elevation: 2,103 feet (641 m)
- Coordinates: 42°48′10″N 74°56′20″W

Geography
- Location within New York Adirondack Park Location within the United States
- Location: NW of Pierstown, New York, U.S.
- Topo map: USGS Richfield Springs

Rum Hill is a mountain located in Central New York Region of New York northwest of the Hamlet of Pierstown. Red House Hill is located southeast, Metcalf Hill is located south, Allen Lake and Mohegan Hill are located north-northwest and Otsego Lake is located east of Rum Hill.

== History ==
It is named Rum Hill because at a meeting between early settlers and the Indians, there was a disagreement and someone pushed a barrel of rum over the hill. The barrel fell from ledge to ledge and finally broke at the bottom. During prohibition times it was referred to as Mount Otsego. At one point in time it was considered the highest point in Otsego County.
