= Fly Creek (Oaks Creek tributary) =

Fly Creek Vlaie Creek
- Location of the mouth of Fly Creek Fly Creek (Oaks Creek tributary) (the United States)

Location
- Country: United States
- State: New York
- Region: Central New York Region
- County: Otsego
- Town: Otsego

Physical characteristics
- Source
  - coordinates: 42°49′05″N 74°57′54″W
- Mouth: Oaks Creek
  - location: Fly Creek, New York, United States
  - coordinates: 42°42′20″N 74°58′55″W
  - elevation: 1,240 ft (380 m)

Basin features
- Progression: Fly Creek → Oaks Creek → Susquehanna River → Chesapeake Bay → Atlantic Ocean
- Tributaries
  - left: Muskrat Pond Outlet

Fly Creek also known as Vlaie Creek, begins by the border of the Town of Otsego and Town of Springfield in Otsego County, New York. Fly Creek then travels south towards the hamlet of Fly Creek and converges with Oaks Creek south of the hamlet of Fly Creek. The Fly Creek Cider Mill and Orchard is located next to Fly Creek. The Mill gets power to make cider from the Fly Creek water flow and is the last remaining mill in the area. Fly Creek is also located partly within the Fly Creek Historic District.

== History ==
One theory to the name of the creek goes that as early as 1714 Dutch traders passed through the area traveling to Otsego Lake. The Dutch word for “marsh” is “vlie”. Fly Creek rises in a marsh to its north, so it is likely that those Dutchmen named the creek Vlie Creek which became known as Fly Creek today.

== See also ==
- List of rivers of New York
