= Hawkins Hill =

Mountain in New York, United States

- Location within New York Location within the United States

Highest point
- Elevation: 2,008 feet (612 m)
- Coordinates: 42°40′05″N 75°00′52″W

Geography
- Location: ENE of Hartwick, New York, U.S.
- Topo map: USGS Hartwick

Hawkins Hill is a mountain in the Central New York Region of New York. It is located in the Town of Hartwick, Otsego County, New York, east-northeast of Hartwick. As of 2012, the hill supported a communications tower that is part of Broome County, New York Public Safety Communications System.
