= Leatherstocking =

Leatherstocking may refer to:

- The Leatherstocking Tales, a series of five novels by James Fenimore Cooper
- Leatherstocking (serial), a serial movie
- Leather Stocking, silent short film
- Leatherstocking Council, council of the Boy Scouts of America in New York
- Leatherstocking Falls, a waterfall in Otsego County, New York
- Leatherstocking Creek, a creek in Otsego County, New York

== See also ==
- Central New York Region, formally called Central Leatherstocking Region
