= Otsego, New York =

- Town
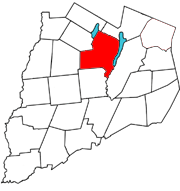
- Otsego County map with the Town of Otsego in red
- Coordinates: 42°44′5″N 74°57′32″W
- Country: United States
- State: New York
- County: Otsego

Government
  - Town Supervisor: Meg Kiernan
  - Town Clerk/Tax Collector: Pam Deane

Area
  - Total: 59.05 sq mi (152.94 km^{2})
  - Land: 53.89 sq mi (139.57 km^{2})
  - Water: 5.16 sq mi (13.37 km^{2})
- Elevation: 1,381 ft (421 m)

Population (2020)
  - Total: 3,641
  - Density: 69.1/sq mi (26.68/km^{2})
- Time zone: UTC-5 (Eastern (EST))
  - Summer (DST): UTC-4 (EDT)
- ZIP code: 13337
- Area code: 607
- FIPS code: 36-55695
- GNIS feature ID: 0979329
- Website: Town website

Otsego is a town in the north-central part of Otsego County, New York, United States. The population was 3,641 at the 2020 census. The town is named after Lake Otsego, which forms part of the town's eastern border. Most of the village of Cooperstown is within the town.

== History ==
Gideon Hawley, a missionary, arrived in this area in 1753. William Cooper purchased land (Cooper Patent) that now is marked, in part, by Cooperstown. Major settlement began around 1788.

The Town of Otsego was organized while still in Montgomery County in 1788, and is the oldest town in the county.

== Geography ==
According to the United States Census Bureau, the town has a total area of 57.8 square miles (150 km^{2}), of which 53.89 square miles (139.6 km^{2}) is land and 5.162 square miles (13.37 km^{2}) (6.18%) is water.

Otsego Lake forms most of the eastern boundary, and Canadarago Lake forms part of the western boundary.

New York State Route 80 is a highway along the western shore of Otsego Lake. New York State Route 28 comes into Cooperstown from the south. At Cooperstown, NY-80 joins NY-28 and they run concurrently towards Fly Creek. Past Fly Creek the NY-28/NY-80 concurrency ends at New York State Route 205 in the western part of Otsego. NY-80 joins NY-205 and continues concurrently toward the west. NY-28 continues on northward out of the town.

== Demographics ==
Historical population
Census	Pop.	Note	%±
1820	4,186		—
1830	4,363		4.2%
1840	4,120		−5.6%
1850	3,901		−5.3%
1860	4,303		10.3%
1870	4,590		6.7%
1880	4,690		2.2%
1890	4,917		4.8%
1900	4,497		−8.5%
1910	4,287		−4.7%
1920	4,223		−1.5%
1930	4,345		2.9%
1940	4,074		−6.2%
1950	4,304		5.6%
1960	4,121		−4.3%
1970	3,998		−3.0%
1980	4,012		0.4%
1990	3,932		−2.0%
2000	3,904		−0.7%
2010	3,900		−0.1%
2020	3,641		−6.6%
U.S. Decennial Census

As of the census of 2000, there were 3,904 people, 1,701 households, and 1,029 families residing in the town. The population density was 72.0 inhabitants per square mile (27.8/km^{2}). There were 2,193 housing units at an average density of 40.5 per square mile (15.6/km^{2}). The racial makeup of the town was 97.75% White, 0.64% African American, 0.08% Native American, 0.69% Asian, 0.26% from other races, and 0.59% from two or more races. Hispanic or Latino people of any race were 1.54% of the population.

There were 1,701 households, out of which 25.5% had children under the age of 18 living with them, 49.1% were married couples living together, 8.3% had a female householder with no husband present, and 39.5% were non-families. 33.6% of all households were made up of individuals, and 15.2% had someone living alone who was 65 years of age or older. The average household size was 2.22 and the average family size was 2.85.

In the town, the population was spread out, with 22.0% under the age of 18, 5.4% from 18 to 24, 23.8% from 25 to 44, 27.7% from 45 to 64, and 21.1% who were 65 years of age or older. The median age was 44 years. For every 100 females, there were 89.0 males. For every 100 females age 18 and over, there were 84.6 males.

The median income for a household in the town was $40,036, and the median income for a family was $48,320. Males had a median income of $33,684 versus $22,868 for females. The per capita income for the town was $26,305. About 4.5% of families and 7.5% of the population were below the poverty line, including 6.7% of those under age 18 and 6.0% of those age 65 or over.

== Communities and locations in the Town of Otsego, New York ==
- Brookwood Point – A projection into Otsego Lake north of Cooperstown
- Cattown – A hamlet west of Fly Creek and Oaksville on NY-80
- Chalk Lake – A small lake located west of Fly Creek
- Chestnut Hill – An elevation located east of the corner of Goose Street and Bailey Road
- Cooperstown – County seat, Most of the Village of Cooperstown is within the town borders.
- Fitch Hill – An elevation near Pierstown on Armstrong Road
- Five Mile Point – A projection into Otsego Lake near the northern town line
- Fly Creek – A hamlet west of Cooperstown on conjoined NY-28/NY-80. The Fly Creek Methodist Church, The Cornfield, Fly Creek Grange No. 844, and Fly Creek Historic District are listed on the National Register of Historic Places.
- Hutter Point – A projection into Otsego Lake, north of Five Mile Point
- Index – A hamlet south of Cooperstown on NY-28. Partially in the Town of Hartwick.
- King Hill – An elevation on the northern town line, partly in the town
- Leatherstocking Falls – A waterfall located on Leatherstocking Creek near the eastern town line
- Metcalf Hill – An elevation northeast of Fitch Hill
- Mud Lake – A small lake located west of Fly Creek
- Muskrat Pond – A small lake located northwest of Fitch Hill
- Oaksville – A hamlet west of Fly Creek on NY-28/80
- Pail Shop Corners – A hamlet north of Fly Creek
- Panther Mountain – An elevation on the eastern shore of Canadarago Lake
- Pierstown – A hamlet near the western side of Otsego Lake
- Red House Hill – An elevation on the west side of Otsego Lake near Five Mile Point
- Six Mile Point – A projection into Otsego Lake, north of Hutter Point
- Snowdon – A hamlet near the western town line on NY-80
- Taylortown – A location north of Pail Shop Corners. At the corner of County Route 26 and Honey Joe Road.
- Three Mile Point – A projection into Otsego Lake, south of Five Mile Point
- Toddsville – A hamlet southwest of Cooperstown. Partially in the Town of Hartwick
- Tunnicliff Hill – An elevation north of Snowdon
- Twelve Thousand – A location in the northwestern corner of the town
- Whalen Hill – An elevation in the southwestern corner of the town. Partially in the town of Hartwick.
- Wileytown – A hamlet in the southwestern part of the town on NY-205

== Notable people ==
- James Fenimore Cooper (1789–1851), author, lived much of his life in Cooperstown and died there
- Daniel DeWitt Tompkins Davie (1816–1877), photographer, born in Otsego
- Jane Lippitt Patterson (1829–1919), writer, editor
- Sarah Maria Clinton Perkins (1824-1905), social reformer, newspaper editor
- David Shipman (1730–1813), the "Leatherstocking" and "Deerslayer" of James Fenimore Cooper's novels, resident of Otsego, lived in a log cabin on the east bank of Oaks Creek
- Isaac Singer (1811–1875), inventor who worked at a machine shop in Fly Creek in the 1830s. The family of his future business partner, Edward C. Clark, has been a major benefactor of Cooperstown since the 19th century.
