= Pail Shop Corners, New York =

- Hamlet
- Location within New York Location within the United States
- Coordinates: 42°43′26″N 74°58′50″W
- Country: United States
- State: New York
- County: Otsego
- Town: Otsego
- Elevation: 1,302 ft (397 m)
- Time zone: UTC-5 (Eastern (EST))
  - Summer (DST): UTC-4 (EDT)
- ZIP code: 13337
- Area code: 607

Pail Shop Corners is a hamlet located at the corner of Hoke Road, Goose Street, and CR-26 north of Fly Creek in the Town of Otsego, in Otsego County, New York, United States. The Fly Creek Cider Mill and Orchard is located by Pail Shop Corners.
