= Cattown, New York =

- Hamlet
- Location within New York Location within the United States
- Coordinates: 42°43′49″N 75°00′11″W
- Country: United States
- State: New York
- County: Otsego
- Town: Otsego
- Elevation: 1,276 ft (389 m)
- Time zone: UTC-5 (Eastern (EST))
  - Summer (DST): UTC-4 (EDT)
- ZIP code: 13337
- Area code: 607

Cattown is a hamlet located at the corner of Cattown and Hoke Roads in the Town of Otsego, New York, in Otsego County, United States. It is west of Fly Creek and north of Oaksville. The hamlet was named Cattown because a woman's husband dropped a cat down a chimney of a house to break up a meeting she was attending because his dinner was late.
