= Taylortown, New York =

- Hamlet
- Location within the state of New York
- Coordinates: 42°45′50″N 74°58′54″W
- Country: United States
- State: New York
- County: Otsego
- Town: Otsego
- Elevation: 1,391 ft (424 m)
- Time zone: UTC-5 (Eastern (EST))
  - Summer (DST): UTC-4 (EDT)
- ZIP code: 13337
- Area code: 607

Taylortown is located 3.5 miles (5.6 km) north of the Hamlet of Fly Creek on Otsego County Route 26 in Otsego County, New York, United States. Taylortown was founded by and named after the Taylor family, who moved there from Bennington, Vermont.

== History ==
Thomas Taylor and his family moved from Bennington, Vermont to the Town of Otsego when there were only three log houses on the site of the village of Cooperstown. The Taylors settled in what would be later called Taylortown. Thomas purchased 1,000 acres for $1,000. Five hundred of those acres were in the town of Otsego. The Taylor children married and settled in the area.
