= The Cornfield (Fly Creek, New York) =

- U.S. National Register of Historic Places
- Location within New York Location within the United States
- Location: 655 Cty Rd. 26, Fly Creek, New York
- Coordinates: 42°27′21″N 75°3′42″W
- Area: less than one acre
- Built: 1928
- NRHP reference No.: 02001047
- Added to NRHP: September 12, 2002

The Cornfield, also known as Farmers' Independent Benevolent Society Hall, is a historic social hall located at Fly Creek in Otsego County, New York. It was built in 1928 and is a one-story wood-frame building constructed as a meeting space and dance hall for the area's small Slovenian immigrant community. The original section measures 50 feet long by 24 feet, 6 inches wide. The original building was expanded in the late 1950s with a kitchen wing and pavilion.

It was listed on the National Register of Historic Places in 2002.
