= Hyde Park (hamlet), New York =

Hamlet in New York, United States

Hyde Park, New York
- Hamlet
- Location within New York Location within the United States
- Coordinates: 42°39′39″N 74°57′29″W
- Country: United States
- State: New York
- County: Otsego
- Town: Hartwick
- Elevation: 1,214 ft (370 m)
- Time zone: UTC-5 (Eastern (EST))
  - Summer (DST): UTC-4 (EDT)
- ZIP code: 13807
- Area code: 607
- GNIS feature ID: 953560

Hyde Park is a hamlet in Otsego County, New York, United States. The community is located along New York State Route 28, 4.5 miles (7.2 km) south of Cooperstown. Hyde Park is served by ZIP code 13807.
