= Arunah Metcalf =

American politician (1771–1848)

Arunah Metcalf (February 14, 1771 – August 15, 1848) was a United States representative from New York.

== Biography ==
Born in Lebanon, Connecticut, on February 14, 1771, he attended the common schools of Lebanon.

In the late 18th century he moved from Connecticut to New York, and settled in Otsego County. Metcalf was part of the "Metcalf Setlement" in Pierstown, which included many of his family members, among them his father and stepmother. Arunah Metcalf owned a farm in the area now known as Metcalf Hill. In addition to operating his farm, Metcalf was involved in other business ventures and became a successful land speculator.

Metcalf served in the state militia, holding the rank of ensign in an Otsego County company. He also became active in local government, including serving as deputy sheriff and county sheriff (1806 to 1810).

He was elected as a Democratic-Republican and served in the Twelfth Congress (March 4, 1811 to March 3, 1813). After serving in Congress Metcalf relocated to Cooperstown. He served in the New York State Assembly (1814 to 1816).

He was a founder of the Otsego County Agricultural Society and served as its president in 1818.

In 1819 Metcalf ran unsuccessfully for the New York State Senate. He returned to the Assembly in 1828.

He died in Cooperstown on August 15, 1848. He was interred at Lakewood Cemetery in Cooperstown.

== Legacy ==
- There is a hill in Otsego County, New York, named after him called Metcalf Hill.

U.S. House of Representatives
Preceded by Erastus Root	Member of the U.S. House of Representatives from New York's 12th congressional district 1811–13	Succeeded by Zebulon R. Shipherd, Elisha I. Winter
