= Panther Mountain (Otsego County, New York) =

Mountain in Otsego County, New York

- Location within New York Adirondack Park Location within the United States

Highest point
- Elevation: 1,965 feet (599 m)
- Coordinates: 42°46′14″N 74°59′51″W

Geography
- Location: Fly Creek / Schuyler Lake, New York, U.S.
- Topo map: USGS Richfield Springs

Panther Mountain is a mountain located in Central New York of New York near Fly Creek, New York and Schuyler Lake, New York. The east side of Panther Mountain drains into Fly Creek and the west side drains into Oaks Creek and Canadarago Lake.

Panther Mountain is named after The Panther, a Mohegan who lived in the Town of Richfield in the early to mid 1800s, as it was his favorite hunting area.
