= Old Hartwick Village Cemetery =

Historic cemetery in New York, United States

- U.S. National Register of Historic Places
- Location within New York Location within the United States
- Location: 2862 County Road 11, near Hartwick, New York
- Coordinates: 42°39′34″N 75°03′13″W
- Area: 0.7 acres (0.28 ha)
- Built: 1797
- NRHP reference No.: 13000611
- Added to NRHP: August 20, 2013

Old Hartwick Village Cemetery, also known as Robinson Cemetery, is a historic cemetery located near Hartwick in Otsego County, New York. The cemetery was established in 1797 and contains approximately 300 burials. The markers date from the late-1790s through about 1880, with the majority dated between about 1825 and 1865.

It was listed on the National Register of Historic Places in 2013.
