= Goey Pond =

Lake in Otsego County, New York, US

- Location of Goey Pond within New York State
- Location: Otsego County, New York
- Coordinates: 42°37′32″N 74°58′27″W
- Type: Freshwater
- Surface area: 35 acres (14 ha)
- Max. depth: 47 ft (14 m)
- Surface elevation: 1,627 feet (496 m)
- Settlements: Milford, New York

Goey Pond or Goey's Pond (also known as Little Pond) is a small lake located northwest of the Village of Milford in the Town of Hartwick in Otsego County, New York.

The pond is only accessible from one road (Goey Pond Road), which is not maintained during the winter months. No dwellings line the lake. Fish species present in the pond are largemouth bass, smallmouth bass, pumpkinseed, chain pickerel, and brown bullhead. Goey Pond is 47 feet deep at its center. (A natural formation, the pond was at one point dammed, which increased its depth by approximately 15 to 25 feet.)

Historically, the pond was the drinking water source for the village of Milford. It was first surveyed in 1965. In 1967, Milford applied for a grant to extend a pipeline deeper into the pond. Currently, Milford does not use Goey Pond as a water supply, but retains possession of the pond, "which may be developed in the future to serve as sources of the water supply to the Village of Milford." As such, bathing, swimming, boating, fishing, and trespassing are officially prohibited at the pond.
