= Fly Creek Methodist Church =

Historic church in New York, United States

- U.S. National Register of Historic Places
- U.S. Historic district – Contributing property
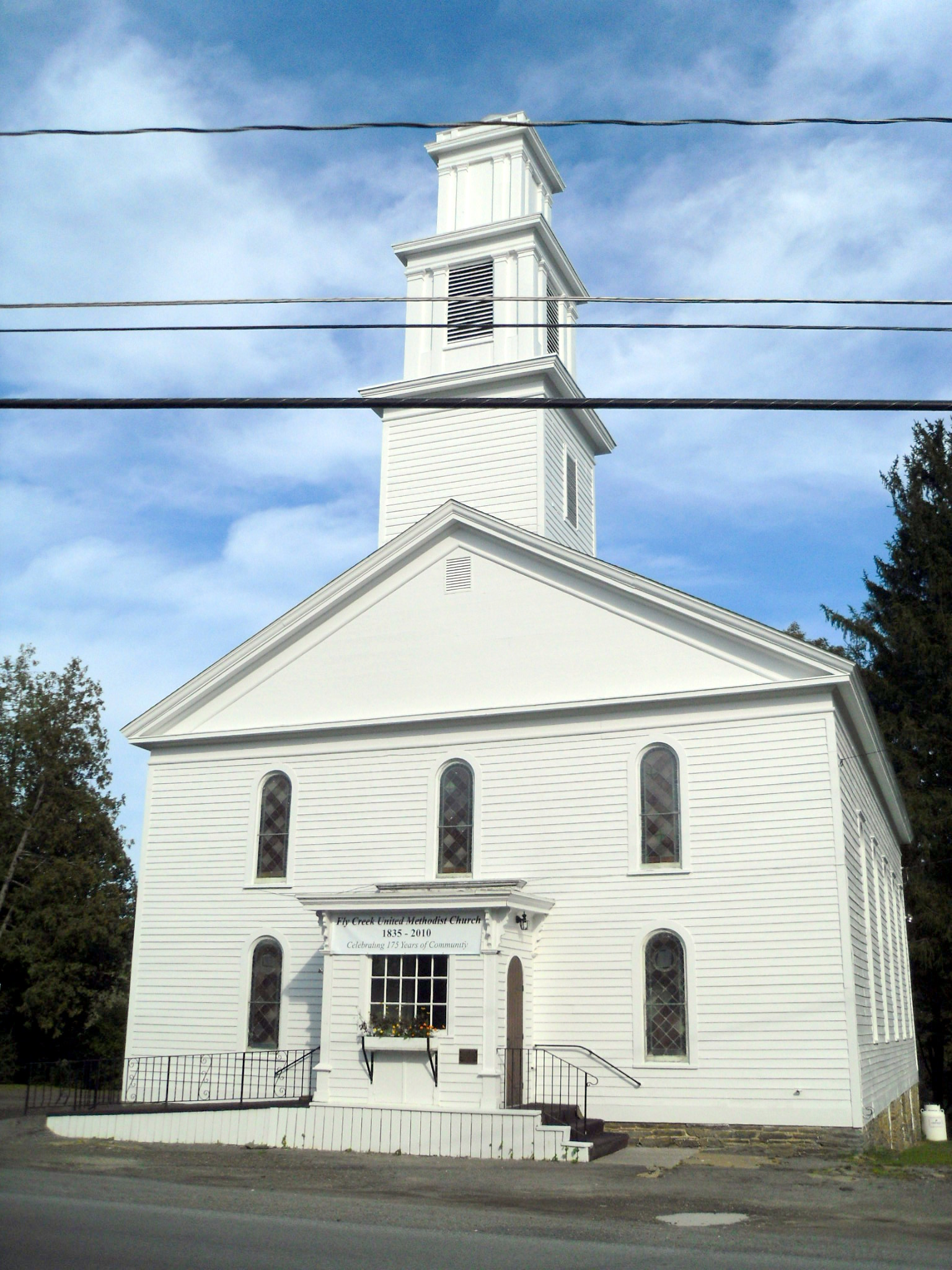
- Fly Creek Methodist Church, September 2010

- Location within New York Location within the United States
- Location: Co. Rt. 26, N of jct. with NY 28/NY 80, Fly Creek, New York
- Coordinates: 42°43′9″N 74°58′59″W
- Area: less than one acre
- Built: 1838
- Architectural style: Greek Revival
- NRHP reference No.: 96000859
- Added to NRHP: August 8, 1996

Fly Creek Methodist Church, also known as First Methodist Episcopal Society in Fly Creek, is a historic Methodist church on County Route 26, north of the junction with conjoined NY 28 and NY 80 in Fly Creek, Otsego County, New York. It was built in 1838 and is a plain, clapboarded, timber-frame building on a fieldstone foundation with a frontal gable in the Greek Revival style. The interior configuration is a modification of the Akron plan. It is located within the boundaries of the Fly Creek Historic District.

It was listed on the National Register of Historic Places in 1996.
