= Mohican Brook =

- Location of the mouth of Mohican Brook Mohican Brook (the United States)

Location
- Country: United States
- State: New York
- Region: Central New York Region
- County: Otsego

Physical characteristics
- Source
  - coordinates: 42°47′47″N 74°56′18″W
- Mouth: Otsego Lake
  - location: Five Mile Point, New York, United States
  - coordinates: 42°45′53″N 74°53′58″W
  - elevation: 1,191 ft (363 m)

Basin features
- Progression: Mohican Brook → Otsego Lake → Susquehanna River → Chesapeake Bay → Atlantic Ocean

Mohican Brook is a creek in central Otsego County, New York. It flows into Otsego Lake north of Cooperstown, New York at Five Mile Point.

Mohican Brook flows through Mohican Canyon which is in The Deerslayer, as the "deep glen" in which the hostile Indians gather after overrunning Deerslayer, as he hides on the crest above while seeking to escape them. Most of this scene, however, takes place on and around Six Mile Point.
