= The White House (Hartwick, New York) =

Historic house in New York, United States

- U.S. National Register of Historic Places
- Location within New York Location within the United States
- Location: 108 White House Rd., Hartwick, New York
- Coordinates: 42°41′14″N 75°03′18″W
- Area: 19.34 acres (7.83 ha)
- Built: 1792, c. 1940
- Architect: Edgarton and Edgarton
- Architectural style: Federal, Colonial Revival
- NRHP reference No.: 12000598
- Added to NRHP: September 4, 2012

The White House, also known as the James Butterfield House, is a historic home located at Hartwick in Otsego County, New York. It was built about 1792 in the Federal style, and remodeled about 1940 with Colonial Revival style elements. It is a two-story, five-bay, L-shaped frame dwelling sheathed in white clapboard. Also on the property are the contributing corn crib (c. 1860–1900), four bay bank barn (c. 1870), and brick library / bookstore (1948-1949).

It was listed on the National Register of Historic Places in 2011.
