= Mathewson–Bice Farmhouse and Mathewson Family Cemetery =

Historic house in New York, United States

- U.S. National Register of Historic Places
- Location within New York Location within the United States
- Location: 204 Bice Rd., Hartwick, near Cooperstown, New York
- Coordinates: 42°41′38″N 74°59′03″W
- Area: 39.92 acres (16.16 ha)
- Built: c. 1800
- NRHP reference No.: 13000331
- Added to NRHP: May 28, 2013

Mathewson–Bice Farmhouse and Mathewson Family Cemetery is a historic home and family cemetery located at Hartwick near Cooperstown in Otsego County, New York. The property was bought in 1796 by David Mathewson and the house was built shortly after the purchase. Mathewson had moved to the area from Rhode Island with a migration after the Revolutionsry War.

The Bice family, included in its title, did not inhabit the house until 1920's.

The house is a two-story, five-bay, timber frame and vertical plank dwelling. It has a stone foundation, side-gable roof, front porch, and shed-roof addition. Also on the property is the Mathewson family cemetery with eight stones dating from 1813 to 1850.

The house sat on 125,000 acres purchased from William Cooper of Cooperstown. It has since reduced to 39.92 acres per the application to the National Registry of Historical Places. Although some out buildings were listed as missing, they were on the property in 1957. Since it was registered, the current owner has restored it to its original state, uncovering a cooking hearth that held antique pots and utensils. They also took down a pony wall that had separated the kitchen, in order to regain the original large Farmhouse kitchen.

[2]: 3, 7 

It was listed on the National Register of Historic Places in 2013.
