= Phinney Creek =

- Location of the mouth of Phinney Creek Phinney Creek (the United States)

Location
- Country: United States
- State: New York
- Region: Central New York
- County: Otsego

Physical characteristics
- Mouth: Oaks Creek
  - location: Lidell Corners, New York, Otsego County, New York
  - coordinates: 42°45′22″N 75°00′59″W
  - elevation: 1,266 ft (386 m)

Phinney Creek flows into the Oaks Creek south of Lidell Corners, New York.
