= Bowe Hill =

Mountain in New York, United States

- Location within New York Location within the United States

Highest point
- Elevation: 1,965 feet (599 m)
- Coordinates: 42°36′13″N 75°01′12″W

Geography
- Location: NE of Mount Vision, New York, U.S.
- Topo map: USGS Mount Vision

Bowe Hill is a mountain in the Central New York Region of New York. It is located in the Town of Hartwick, southwest of Arnold Lake and northeast of Mount Vision. It was once referred to as Rye Hill due to the large quantities of cereal grain grown on its slopes.
