= Pierstown, New York =

- Hamlet
- Location within New York Location within the United States
- Coordinates: 42°46′18″N 74°54′46″W
- Country: United States
- State: New York
- County: Otsego
- Town: Otsego
- Elevation: 1,427 ft (435 m)
- Time zone: UTC-5 (Eastern (EST))
  - Summer (DST): UTC-4 (EDT)
- ZIP code: 13337
- Area code: 607

Pierstown is a hamlet located on CR-28 north of Cooperstown and west of Five Mile Point in the Town of Otsego, in Otsego County, New York, United States.

Pierstown Grange No. 793 is located here and is one of three remaining in Otsego County. It is a contributing building to the Glimmerglass Historic District.

== History ==
The story of Pierstown unfolds rapidly, its early days marked by the industrious hum of mills harnessing the power of Leatherstocking Creek as it cascaded over Leatherstocking Falls.

But time, as it often does, brought change. By 1886, only a solitary blacksmith shop remained as a testament to Pierstown's once-thriving past. Agriculture took center stage, transforming the town into a pastoral landscape. This shift mirrored trends across upstate New York, where farming eventually declined in the latter part of the 20th century.

Pierstown's origins trace back to the Pīer family, pioneers who settled the land as part of the Great Barrington Purchase around 1786. Six brothers established themselves on the Brick House Farm, one even opening a tavern. Notably, brother Abner served in the Revolutionary War, enduring a harrowing ordeal during the Cherry Valley Massacre where he was tomahawked, scalped, and wounded, yet miraculously survived.
