= Index, New York =

- Hamlet
- Location within New York Location within the United States
- Coordinates: 42°39′55″N 74°57′33″W
- Country: United States
- State: New York
- County: Otsego
- Towns: Hartwick, Otsego
- Elevation: 1,184 ft (361 m)
- Time zone: UTC-5 (Eastern (EST))
  - Summer (DST): UTC-4 (EDT)
- ZIP code: 13337
- Area code: 607

Index is a hamlet in the Town of Hartwick, New York, and partially in Town of Otsego, Otsego County, New York, United States. It is located at the corner of CR-11 and NY-28. Oaks Creek runs east through the hamlet and converges with the Susquehanna River just east of the hamlet.
