= Hartwick Historic District =

Historic district in New York, United States

- U.S. National Register of Historic Places
- U.S. Historic district
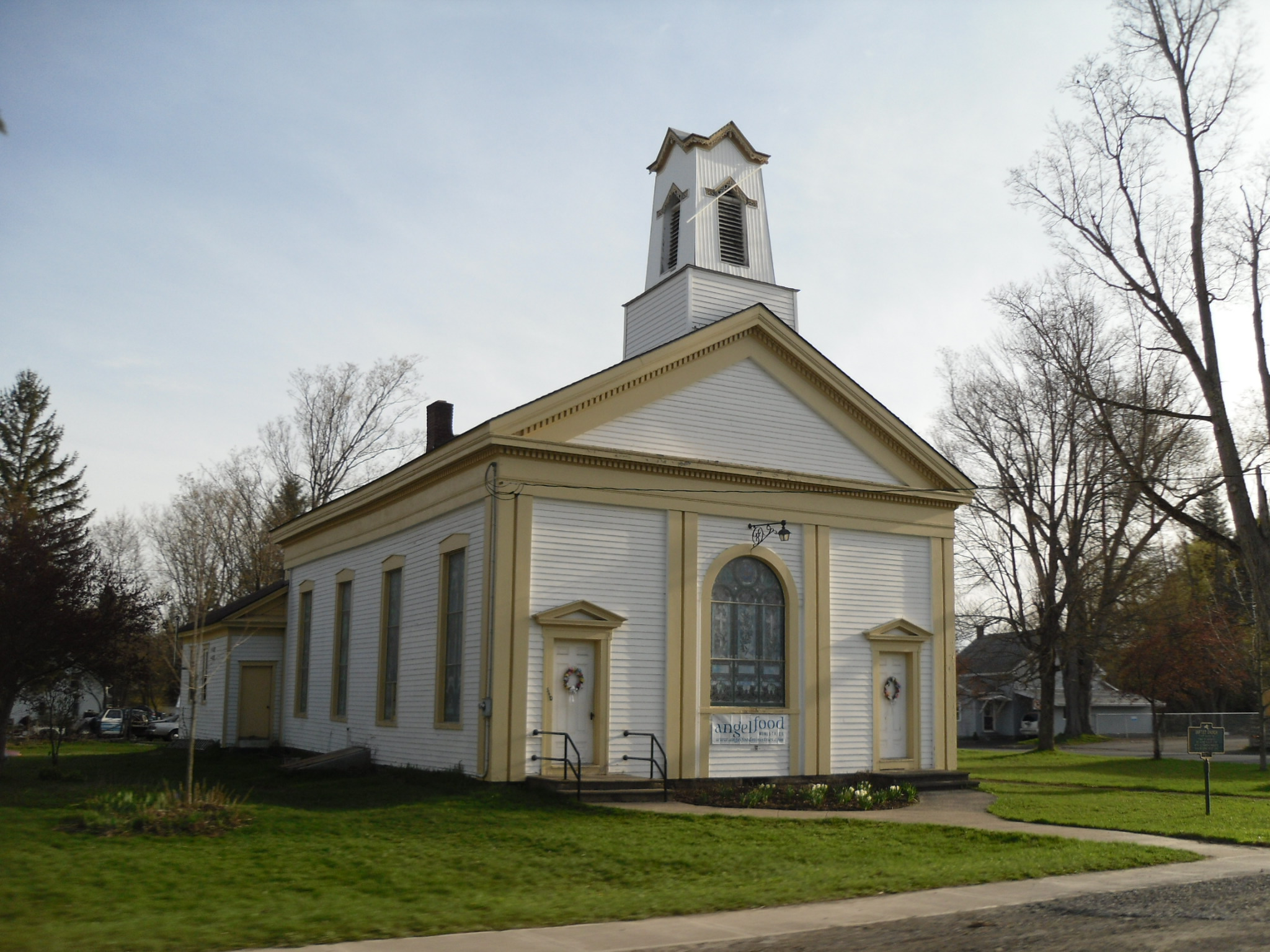
- First Baptist Church, April 2010

- Location within New York Location within the United States
- Location: Roughly along New York State Route 205, County Road 11, and Weeks Road, Hartwick, New York
- Coordinates: 42°39′34″N 75°03′13″W
- Area: 179.15 acres (72.50 ha)
- Built: c. 1800
- Architectural style: Late Victorian, Late 19th and 20th Century Revivals
- NRHP reference No.: 13000610
- Added to NRHP: August 20, 2013

Hartwick Historic District is a national historic district located at Hartwick in Otsego County, New York. The district encompasses 149 contributing buildings and 1 contributing site in the hamlet of Hartwick. The buildings date from about 1800 through the 1960s, and include representative examples of popular architectural styles. Notable buildings include the Christian Church (1853, 1879), Methodist Church (1839), First Baptist Church (1856), Hartwick Coal and Feed Co. (1901), and former Harwick High School (1921).

It was listed on the National Register of Historic Places in 2013.
