= Fly Creek Historic District =

Historic district in New York, United States

- U.S. National Register of Historic Places
- U.S. Historic district
- Location within New York Location within the United States
- Location: NY 28, NY 80, cty Rd. 26, Cemetery Rd., Goose St. Allison Rd., Bissell Rd., Fly Creek, New York
- Coordinates: 42°43′11″N 74°58′38″W
- Area: 460 acres (190 ha)
- MPS: Industrial Development in the Oaks Creek Valley, Otsego County, New York MPS
- NRHP reference No.: 06001004
- Added to NRHP: November 8, 2006

Fly Creek Historic District is a national historic district located at Fly Creek in Otsego County, New York.

It encompasses 111 contributing buildings, three contributing sites, and 88 contributing structures. The district incorporates three hamlet clusters:

- Pail Shop Corners,
- Village of Fly Creek (unincorporated),
- Marvin Mills,

collectively known as "Fly Creek."

The district includes the separately listed Fly Creek Grange No. 844 and Fly Creek Methodist Church.

It was listed on the National Register of Historic Places in 2006.
