= Oaksville, New York =

- Hamlet
- Location within New York Location within the United States
- Coordinates: 42°43′29″N 75°00′18″W
- Country: United States
- State: New York
- County: Otsego
- Town: Otsego
- Elevation: 1,276 ft (389 m)
- Time zone: UTC-5 (Eastern (EST))
  - Summer (DST): UTC-4 (EDT)
- ZIP code: 13337
- Area code: 607

Oaksville is a hamlet west of Cooperstown on conjoined NY-28/NY-80, in the Town of Otsego, New York, in Otsego County, New York, United States. Oaks Creek flows south through the hamlet.

== History ==
Oaksville was once served by the Southern New York Railroad and the site of one of the stations. Located in Oaksville was the cotton mill called the Otsego Print-works, which was built by Russell Williams in 1830.
