= Sarah Maria Clinton Perkins =

American writer

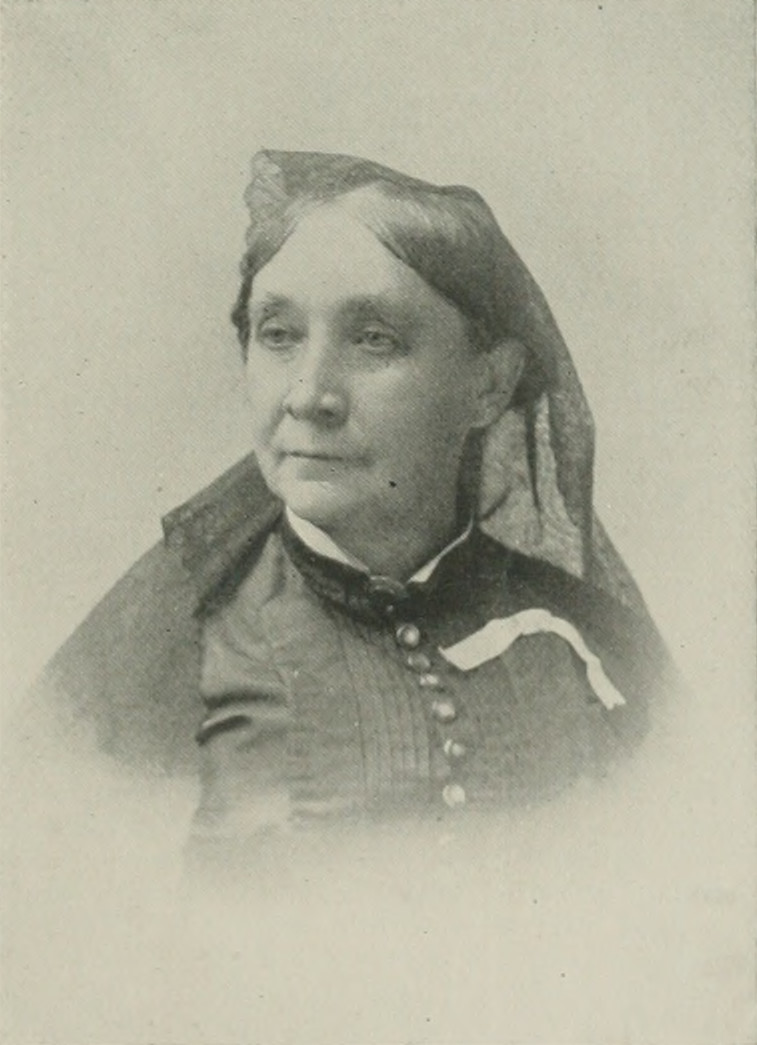
- "A Woman of the Century"
- Born: Sarah Maria Clinton; April 23, 1824; Otsego, New York, USA
- Died: December 2, 1905 (aged 81); Cleveland, Ohio, USA
- Education: Adams Academy
- Occupations: Universalist minister; social reformer; lecturer; editor; author
- Spouse: Orrin Perkins (m. 1847; died 1880)
- Children: 3 daughters
- Relatives: DeWitt Clinton
- Writing career
- Pen name: S. M. Perkins; S. M. C. Perkins

Sarah Maria Clinton Perkins (née Clinton; pen name S. M. Perkins and S. M. C. Perkins; April 23, 1824 – December 2, 1905) was an American Universalist minister, social reformer, lecturer, editor, and author of Sunday school books. Early in life, she was engaged in educational work. She was involved in the temperance movement and advocated for women's suffrage. She was an early abolitionist and an early Prohibitionist. Perkins was a highly educated woman, a writer and speaker of rare force. Moving to Cleveland, Ohio, after being widowed in 1880, she was for many years actively connected as National Lecturer with the Woman's Christian Temperance Union (WCTU). She filled various other positions in reform associations including, President of Cleveland's Equal Franchise Club, and president of the Literary Guild of Cleveland.

== Early life and education ==
Sarah Maria Clinton was born in Otsego, New York, near Cooperstown, April 23, 1824. She was the seventh of a family of nine children, and one of six daughters. Her parents were Joel and Mary Clinton. On her father's side, she was connected with DeWitt Clinton, who was a cousin of her grandfather. On her mother's side, she was descended from the Mathewson family, well known in the early history of Rhode Island and Connecticut. Her mother was the daughter of a Puritan of the strictest type, and trained her daughter according to the old-fashioned rules which came over in the Mayflower.

When Perkins was ten, her father died, leaving no property. The mother struggled hard to support the family. She first trained her children to cherish a faith in God, and in the triumph of good over evil. She set them examples of industry and economy, by carrying her burdens cheerfully, and denying herself first.

Perkins early showed a fondness for books and for study, and eagerly read everything at her disposal. At a very early age Sarah exhibited a natural love for out of door sports, and at the same time developed a great fondness for books and study, and was always an apt scholar. She remembers a prize of one dollar awarded to her by "spelling down" the entire school even though she was one of the youngest pupils. She learned the multiplication table by cutting it out of an old book and pinning it to the head of her bedstand, and studying it early in the morning, when she first awoke.

Perkins continued to study for the purpose of becoming a teacher, thinking at that time that a district school teacher stood upon almost the highest pinnacle that any woman could, with propriety, attempt to reach. She said to one of her close teacher friends one day, when despondent,— "It is all a mistake that God made me a girl, for if I were a man I could and would preach."

At fifteen, she became a member of the church and a Sunday-school teacher.

== Career ==
=== New England ===
Picking up bits of knowledge in the intervals of work, she progressed well with her education. At eighteen, in Otsego, at Hope Mills, in her own district, she began her work as a school teacher. With the money she earned, she started for the academy in Adams, Massachusetts and she continued, in this piece meal way, teaching summers and attending school in the winters, until she acquired a fine education. She was a successful teacher in Savoy, Massachusetts and Cheshire, Massachusetts, where she had pupils in algebra and the highest English branches, down to the alphabet, a school of sixty children in one room, and governed with executive ability.

She met Orrin Perkins (Note: Willard & Livermore (1893), appear to misspell the husband's given name as "Owen".) while they were students at the Adams Academy. In December 1847, she married Rev. Perkins, a Universalist minister of Savoy, Massachusetts, who was pastor of the church in Bernardston, Massachusetts. She was a pastor's wife three years in that place, several years in Wilmington, Massachusetts for a time in Shirley, Massachusetts, and twelve years in Winchester, New Hampshire. The years were passed in a parsonage home, visiting the sick, comforting the mourners, teaching in the Sunday schools and keeping a hospitable home. Her student-life was continued. She read history, studied French and German and took care of three daughters. For many years, Rev. Perkins was State Superintendent of Schools of New Hampshire.

After facing adversities, the family assumed charge of a large seminary in Cooperstown. For several years Mrs. Perkins taught classes, studied French, took charge of one hundred persons, and looked after eight servants. Eventually, Rev. Perkins' health failed, and for 15 years, he was an invalid. Then the wife came to his assistance in the pulpit, writing sermons and preaching them to his people. She also went on the platform as a lecturer. She gave literary and temperance lectures before the Women's Crusade (1873). At this time a brother's family of young children were left without a mother, and Perkins took the four nieces and nephews into her own home, looking carefully after their welfare, until other homes were provided.

Wanting to earn money in order to educate her daughters, Perkins turned to writing children's literature. She was the author of several Sunday school books, most of them published in Boston. Alice and Her Friends was one of the "Prize Series" issued by the Universalist Publishing House. Eugene Cooper went through many editions. A lecture was thought of, written and given. Her prose was superior to her poetry, but "My Sisters" was notable.

The old desire to preach returned to Perkins as the children left the home, and she received license to preach in Illinois, while working for the Woman's Missionary Association, and was ordained as a Universalist minister at West Concord, Vermont, February 13, 1877 or 1878. She also had a brief settlement at Keene, New Hampshire. In 1880, Mr. Perkins's health began to fail, and a trip to the west was taken, believing it would benefit him, but he died suddenly, October 30.

=== Ohio ===
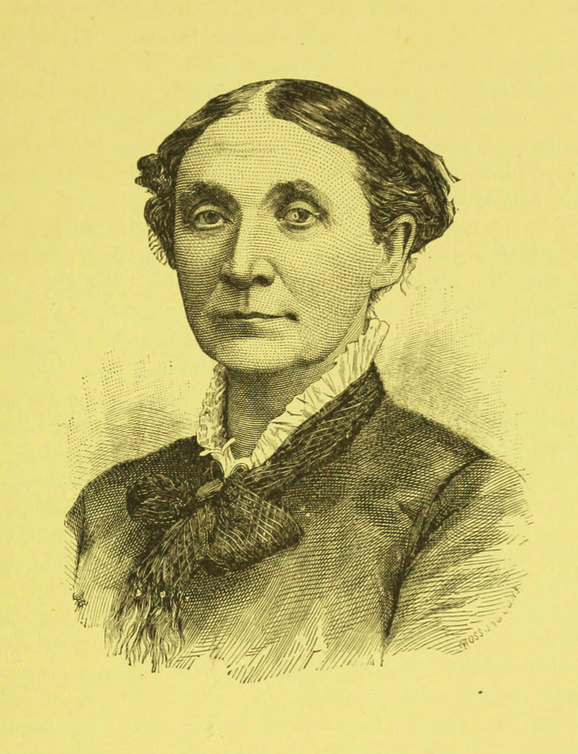
(undated)

Widowed, Perkins moved to Cleveland, Ohio. About 1883, she withdrew from active ministry.

For many years she was one of the national organizers of the WCTU, serving as district president. She was the superintendent of infirmary work for the Ohio WCTU. She was sent by the National WCTU to Kansas, Texas, and the Indian Territory. Many new unions and a revival of interest were the result of those missionary visits. She lectured upon temperance and woman suffrage in nearly every state in the U.S. She filled various positions in reform associations including, President of the Equal Franchise Club, and president of the Literary Guild of Cleveland and the Ramabai Missionary Circle.

During the period of 1891–1904, Perkins was the editor of A True Republic, a popular monthly family paper with a large circulation. While also focusing on temperance and suffrage, it was also devoted to the uplift of the home and womanhood.

== Personal life ==
Perkins' two younger daughters, Florence and Emma, graduated from Vassar College as the valedictorians of their respective classes. The oldest was educated in a New England seminary. Besides her own children, Perkins assisted nine orphans to secure an education.

At the death of Rev. Perkins, one-half of his large library was given to his native town to start a free library.

Sarah Maria Clinton Perkins was killed December 2, 1905, by a coal wagon while crossing the street in Cleveland, Ohio. Her papers are held by the Western Reserve Historical Society.

== Selected works ==
- Alice and Her Friends, by S. M. C. Perkins, 1875
- Eugene Cooper, by S. M. Perkins, 1876
- Objections considered : an address given at Washington, D.C., before the Seventeenth Annual Convention of the National Woman Suffrage Association, Jan. 21, 1885, 1885
- Helen, or, Will she save him?, by Sarah M. Perkins, 1886
- Infirmaries, 188?
- Six of Them, by Sarah Maria Perkins, 1898
- Pioneer Work, 1904
- The cousins, or, The pulling down of Stronghold
- The child of the snow drift
