= Red House Hill =

Mountain in New York, US

- Location within New York Adirondack Park Location within the United States

Highest point
- Elevation: 1,608 feet (490 m)
- Coordinates: 42°46′16″N 74°54′17″W

Geography
- Location: SSW of Springfield Center, New York, U.S.
- Topo map: USGS Richfield Springs

Red House Hill is a mountain in the Central New York Region of the State of New York, United States. It is located south-southwest of the Hamlet of Springfield Center, New York, west of Hutter Point and Six Mile Point of Otsego Lake, and southeast of Rum Hill. Mohican Brook flows eastward along the southern edge of the hill.

== Appearance in literature ==
Red House Hill is in The Deerslayer novel, but not mentioned directly. Deerslayer was escaping the Hurons along the lake from the Sunken Island and began to move inland after a short distance, near Six Mile Point, and climbed the mountain, now known as Red House Hill. At the top of the hill he hid under a log, and the Hurons passed him thinking he was gone, and went down into Mohican Canyon. He then noticed he was surrounded on three sides and ran down the hill towards the lake, passing through the few Hurons left at Six Mile Point. He then jumped in his canoe and was soon captured by the Hurons.
