= Fitch Hill =

Mountain in New York, United States

- Location within New York Location within the United States

Highest point
- Elevation: 1,844 feet (562 m)
- Coordinates: 42°45′56″N 74°57′04″W

Geography
- Location: Pierstown, New York, U.S.
- Topo map: USGS Richfield Springs

Fitch Hill is a mountain located in Central New York Region of New York by Pierstown. Fitch Hill is named after the Fitch family who were early settlers in the area.

The first Methodist Episcopal Church of the Town of Otsego was organized in 1813. The society erected a church edifice in 1835, located on Fitch Hill. It was a plain building, about 24 by 30 feet.
