= Toddsville, New York =

- Hamlet
- Location within New York Location within the United States
- Coordinates: 42°41′16″N 74°57′30″W
- Country: United States
- State: New York
- County: Otsego
- Towns: Hartwick, Otsego
- Elevation: 1,243 ft (379 m)
- Time zone: UTC-5 (Eastern (EST))
  - Summer (DST): UTC-4 (EDT)
- ZIP code: 13337
- Area code: 607

Toddsville is a hamlet located south of Fly Creek on the Oaks Creek in the Town of Otsego and Hartwick, Otsego County, New York, United States. Toddsville derived its name from Jehiel Todd, who came from Connecticut in an early day and settled in that locality. In 1790 the first mill in the town was opened in Toddsville.
