= Leatherstocking Creek =

Creek in Otsego County, New York

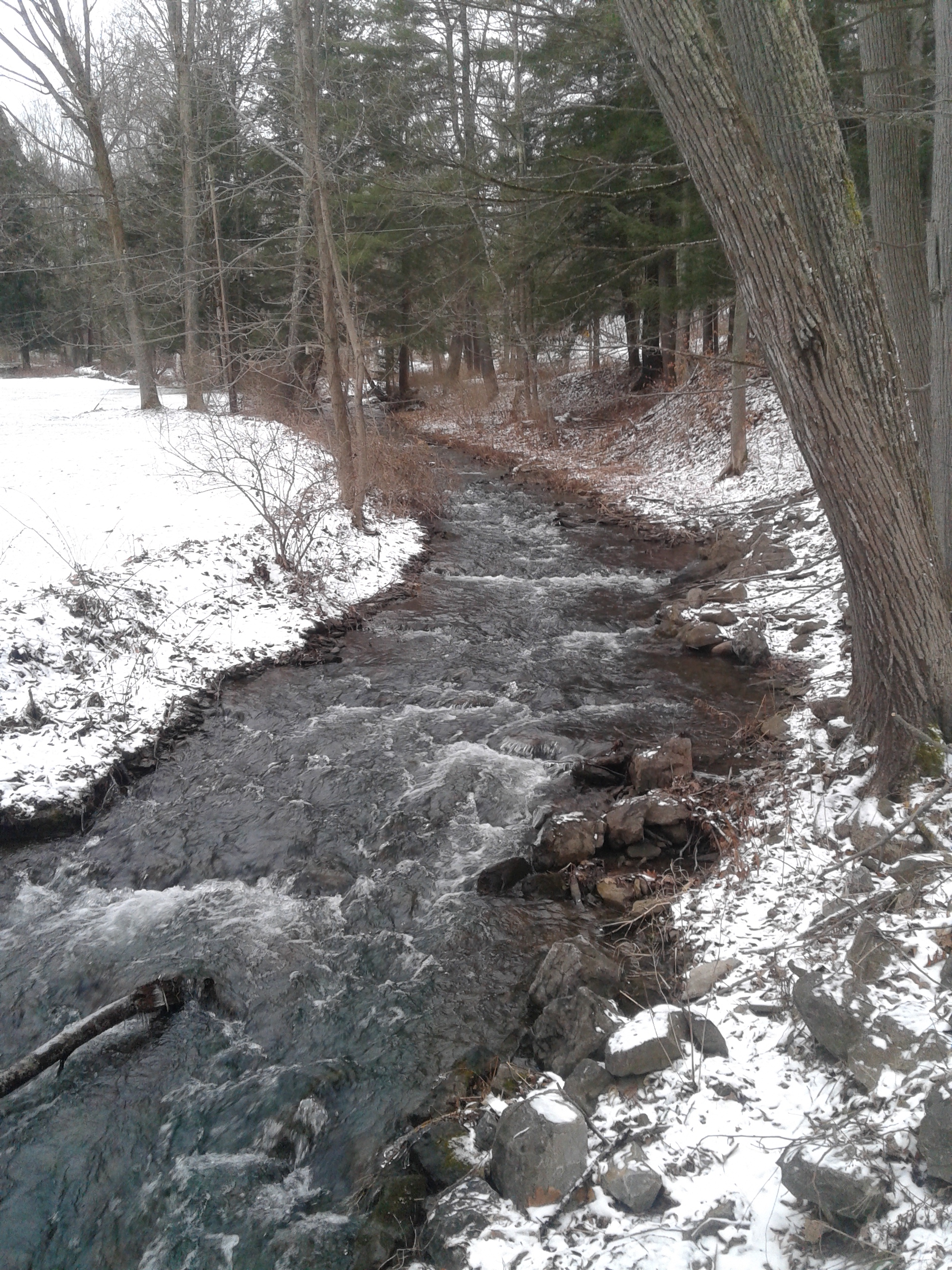
- Leatherstocking Creek in December 2018

- Location of the mouth of Leatherstocking Creek Leatherstocking Creek (the United States)

Location
- Country: United States
- State: New York
- Region: Central New York Region
- County: Otsego
- Town: Otsego

Physical characteristics
- Source
  - location: NW of Pierstown
  - coordinates: 42°47′01″N 74°56′02″W
- Mouth: Otsego Lake
  - location: N of Cooperstown
  - coordinates: 42°43′56″N 74°54′53″W
  - elevation: 1,191 ft (363 m)

Basin features
- Progression: Leatherstocking Creek → Otsego Lake → Susquehanna River → Chesapeake Bay → Atlantic Ocean
- Waterfalls: Leatherstocking Falls

Leatherstocking Creek is a small creek in central Otsego County, New York. It begins northwest of Pierstown and flows southeast then south before flowing into Otsego Lake north of Cooperstown, and just south of Three Mile Point.

The historic Leatherstocking Falls also known as "Panthers Leap" and "Deowongo Falls", are located on this creek. These falls are where, in James Fenimore Cooper's Leatherstocking Tales, Leatherstocking saves the life of an Indian maiden.

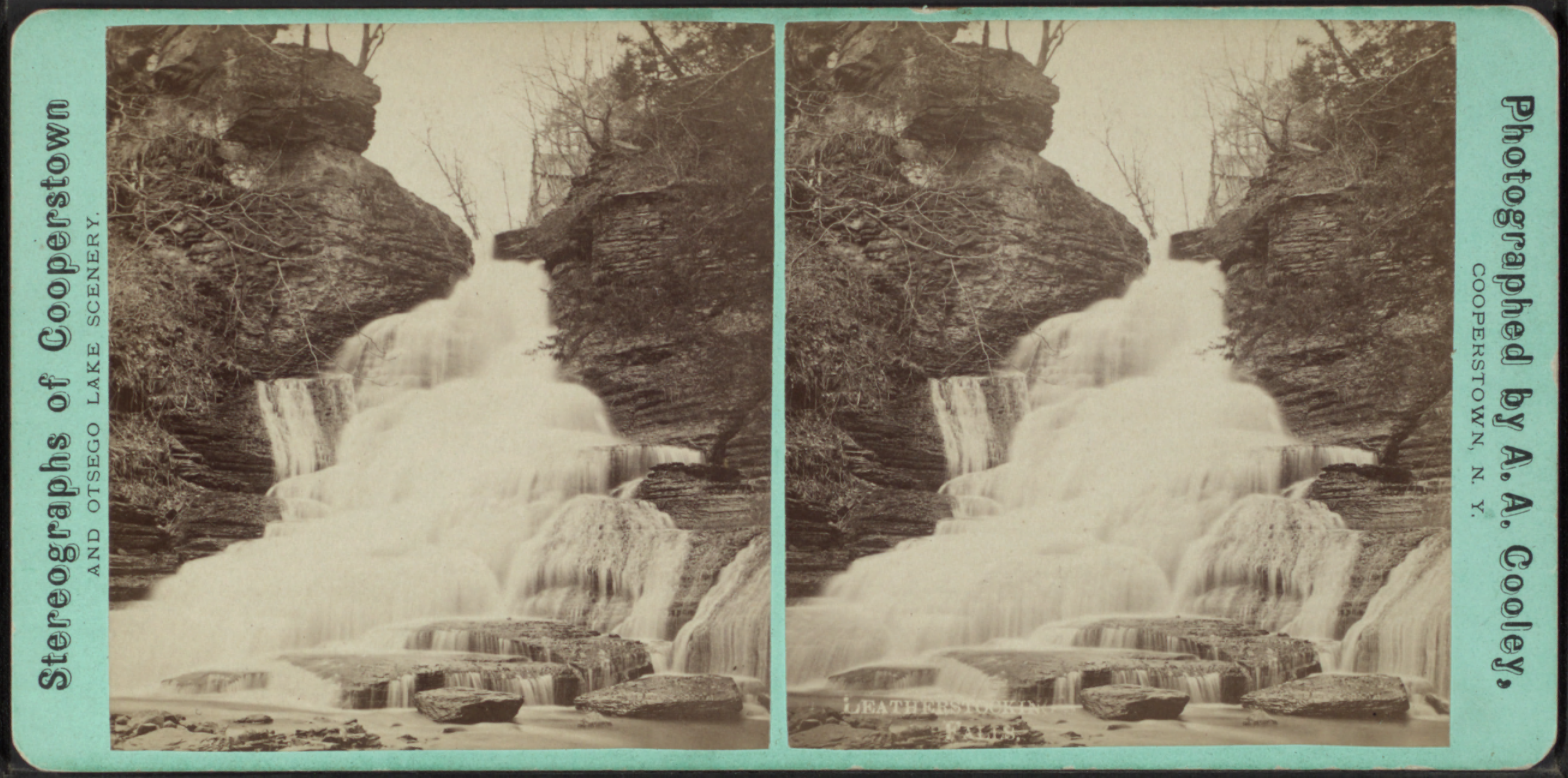
Picture of Leatherstocking Falls taken between 1865 and 1880
