= Fly Creek Grange No. 844 =

- U.S. National Register of Historic Places
- U.S. Historic district – Contributing property
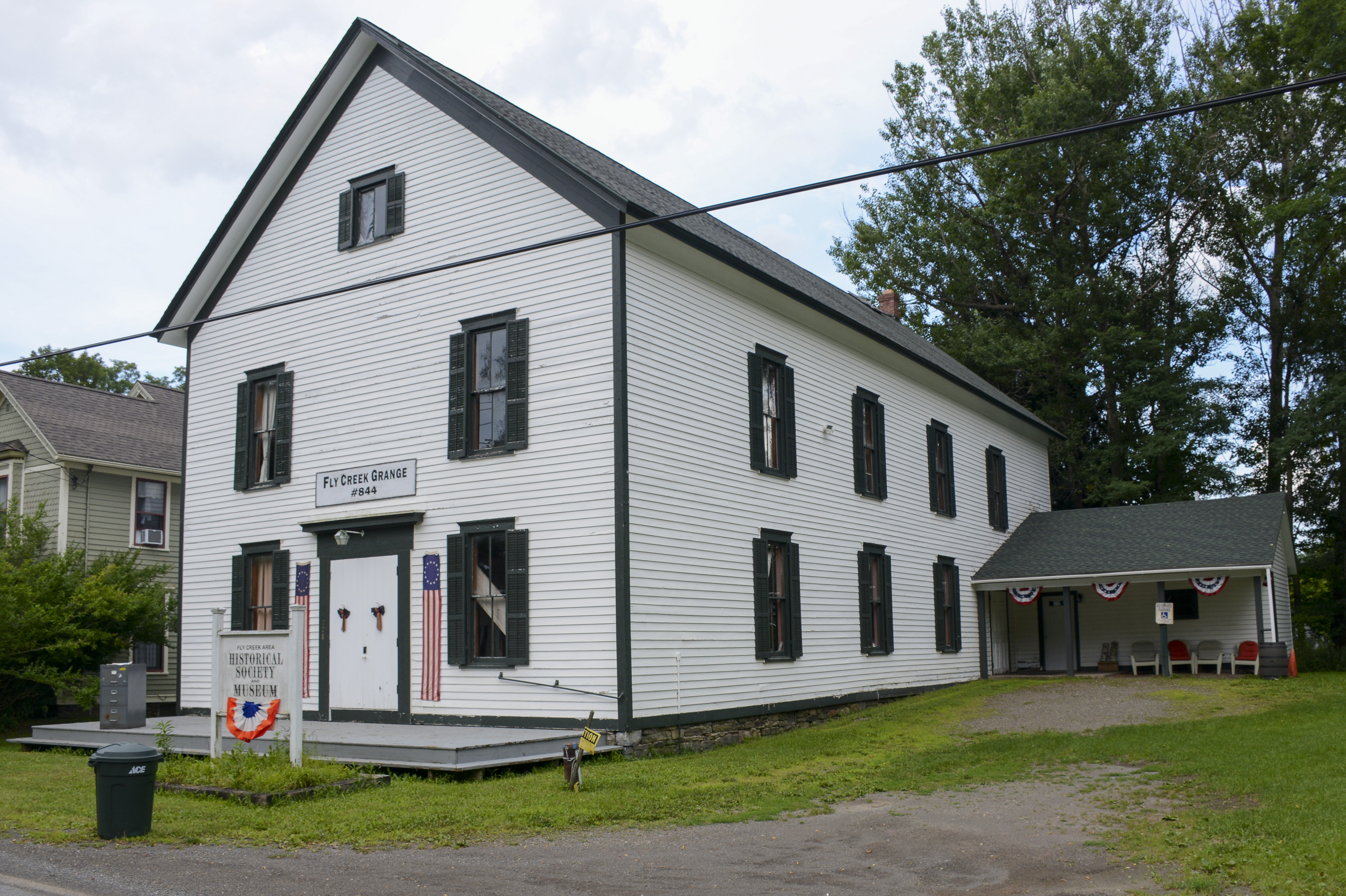

- Location within New York Location within the United States
- Location: 208 Cemetery Rd. Fly Creek, New York
- Coordinates: 42°43′0″N 74°59′2″W
- Area: less than one acre
- Built: 1899
- Architect: Allen, Charles
- NRHP reference No.: 04000097
- Added to NRHP: February 25, 2004

Fly Creek Grange No. 844, also known as Fly Creek Area Historical Society and Museum, is a historic Grange Hall located at Fly Creek in Otsego County, New York. It was built in 1899, is a large 2 1/2-story, gable-roofed, rectangular frame structure, 30 feet wide and 80 feet deep. It is sheathed in clapboard siding and rests on a cut stone and rubble foundation. It is located within the boundaries of the Fly Creek Historic District.

It was listed on the National Register of Historic Places in 2004.
