= Hartwick Seminary, New York =

- Hamlet and CDP
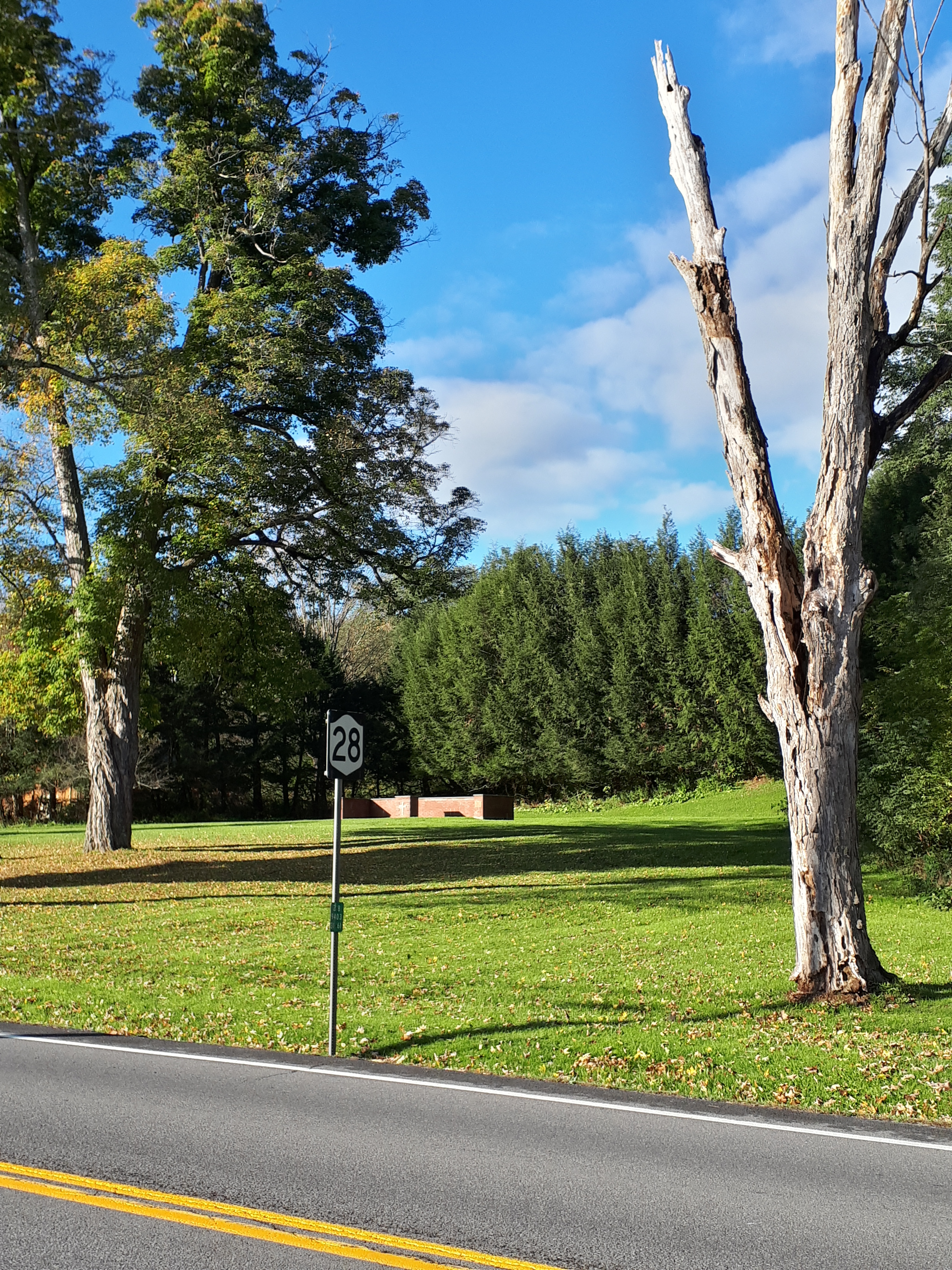
- Original location of the Hartwick Seminary, before it was moved in the early 20th century.

- Location within New York Location within the United States
- Coordinates: 42°38′35″N 74°57′56″W
- Country: United States
- State: New York
- County: Otsego
- Town: Hartwick

Area
  - Total: 1.96 sq mi (5.08 km^{2})
- Elevation: 1,260 ft (380 m)
- Time zone: UTC-5 (Eastern (EST))
  - Summer (DST): UTC-4 (EDT)
- ZIP code: 13326
- Area code: 607
- GNIS feature ID: 952325

Hartwick Seminary is a hamlet (and census-designated place) in Otsego County, New York, United States. The community is located along New York State Route 28, 5 miles (8.0 km) south of Cooperstown. Hartwick Seminary is served by ZIP code 13326. As of the 2020 census, Hartwick Seminary had a population of 356.

Per plaques and signs along State Route 28, the hamlet is the original site of the Hartwick Seminary, now Hartwick College. The seminary was founded in 1797 by Rev. John Christopher Hartwick, who located the seminary here in 1816.
