= Metcalf Hill =

Mountain in New York, United States

- Location within New York Location within the United States

Highest point
- Elevation: 1,962 feet (598 m)
- Coordinates: 42°46′54″N 74°56′22″W

Geography
- Location: Pierstown, New York, U.S.
- Topo map: USGS Richfield Springs

Metcalf Hill is a mountain in the central New York region of New York by Pierstown. Metcalf Hill is named after Arunah Metcalf.

Orlando Metcalf was born on Metcalf Hill on August 17, 1797. His father Arunah Metcalf moved to Otsego County in 1794. Arunah Metcalf served as Otsego County Sheriff from 1806–1810.
