= Fly Creek Cider Mill and Orchard =

Historic Cider Mill in Fly Creek, New York

- Founded: 1856
- Headquarters: 42°43′28″N 74°58′43″W, Fly Creek, New York
- Website: www.flycreekcidermill.com

The Fly Creek Cider Mill and Orchard is a historic water-powered cider mill on the banks of Fly Creek. The marketplace at the mill has more than 300 specialty foods, including fresh mill-made fudge, mill-aged extra-sharp cheddar cheese, salsa, apple wines and hard ciders. The Tasting Room offers samples and tasting flights of the Mill's Farm Winery Products. The mill pond has an observation deck with tables to get lunch from the Snack Barn Restaurant and Bakery, including ice cream delights and the famous cider float. During summer months the Mill is home to the popular Coopertown Pin Trade Program. The mill is open spring through December (Check website for more hours) and located at the corner of CR 26 and Goose Street north of the hamlet of Fly Creek, New York, which is 3.5 miles west of Cooperstown, New York off of State Route 28N and 80W.

The Fly Creek Cider Mill is part of the Cooperstown Beverage Trail.
