= Six Mile Point =

- Cape
- Location within New York Six Mile Point (the United States)
- Coordinates: 42°46′50″N 74°53′55″W
- Location: North of Cooperstown, New York, U.S.
- Offshore water bodies: Otsego Lake
- Elevation: 363 m (1,191 ft)
- Topo map: Richfield Springs

Six Mile Point also known as Hickory Grove is a geographic cape extending into Otsego Lake in the Town of Otsego north of Cooperstown, New York. Six Mile Point is the location in The Deerslayer that Natty Bumppo makes an unsuccessful effort to escape from the Hurons.

== Appearance in literature ==
Six Mile Point is mentioned in The Deerslayer. After running south through the shallow waters along the shore for fifty yards, Deerslayer was escaping the Hurons along the lake and began to move inland and climb the mountain, now known as Red House Hill. At the top of the hill he hid under a log, and the Hurons passed him thinking he was gone. He then noticed he was surrounded on three sides and ran down the hill towards the lake, passing through the few Hurons left at Six Mile Point. He then jumped in his canoe and was soon captured by the Hurons.
