= Hartwick, New York =

- Town
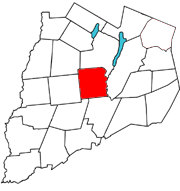
- Otsego County map with the Town of Hartwick in red
- Coordinates: 42°38′33″N 75°0′55″W
- Country: United States
- State: New York
- County: Otsego

Area
  - Total: 40.42 sq mi (104.69 km^{2})
  - Land: 40.09 sq mi (103.82 km^{2})
  - Water: 0.34 sq mi (0.87 km^{2})
- Elevation: 1,667 ft (508 m)

Population (2020)
  - Total: 1,952
  - Density: 49/sq mi (18.8/km^{2})
- Time zone: UTC-5 (Eastern (EST))
  - Summer (DST): UTC-4 (EDT)
- ZIP code: 13348
- Area code: 607
- FIPS code: 36-32589
- GNIS feature ID: 0979056
- Website: www.hartwickny.gov

Hartwick is a town located in Otsego County, New York, United States. As of the 2020 census, the town had a population of 1,952. The Town of Hartwick is located in the middle of the county, southwest of the Village of Cooperstown.

== History ==
The town was named for Lutheran minister John Christopher Hartwick (1714–1796), an early landowner of the town. He bought the area (the Hartwick Patent, granted 1761) that now constitutes the township from the Mohawk Indians in 1763. Discontented with the sparsely settled communities of Palatine Germans in the Mohawk Valley to the north, which Hartwick believed made people immoral, he bought the original Hartwick Patent with the intent to build a "New Jerusalem". Hartwick tried to control development, stipulating that residents look to him as their religious superior. By the 1790s the shrewd land speculator William Cooper had sold most of Hartwick's land against his wishes.

Hartwick requested in his will that a Lutheran seminary be opened with his estate. Upon his death in 1797, efforts to do this started, but were complicated by the fact that Hartwick left his estate to Jesus Christ. The Lutheran seminary established at Hartwick in 1797 was incorporated in 1816. It moved to Oneonta after 1931, and in 1947 merged with the Hartwick College, established in 1927. The town was established in 1802 from the Town of Otsego. In 1803, the north town line was altered.

The largest commercial enterprise to occur in Hartwick was probably the Southern New York Railroad, which was constructed in the town in 1901. It was supported by extensive shops, a car barn and yards on the southeast side of the village. Many of the hamlets and crossings still show architectural signs related to the trolley line nearly a century after the last passenger service.

The Hartwick Historic District, Mathewson–Bice Farmhouse and Mathewson Family Cemetery, Old Hartwick Village Cemetery, and The White House are listed on the National Register of Historic Places.

== Geography ==
According to the United States Census Bureau, the town has a total area of 40.4 square miles (105 km^{2}), of which 40.1 square miles (104 km^{2}) is land and 0.3 square miles (0.78 km^{2}) (0.83%) is water. Otsego Creek flows through the western part of Hartwick. The Susquehanna River defines the eastern town line.

New York State Route 205 is a north-south highway in the western side of Hartwick.

== Education ==
The Upward Bound Alternative Education Program was an alternative high school in Hartwick. It was established in 1983 by Gary Michael Newell and Mark Rathbun. Offered under the Otsego Northern Catskills Boards of Cooperative Educational Services, the school served nontraditional students and was located on the former Hartwick School campus.

== Demographics ==
Historical population
Census	Pop.	Note	%±
1820	2,579		—
1830	2,772		7.5%
1840	2,490		−10.2%
1850	2,352		−5.5%
1860	2,496		6.1%
1870	2,339		−6.3%
1880	2,340		0.0%
1890	1,894		−19.1%
1900	1,800		−5.0%
1910	1,813		0.7%
1920	1,648		−9.1%
1930	1,487		−9.8%
1940	1,438		−3.3%
1950	1,473		2.4%
1960	1,400		−5.0%
1970	1,631		16.5%
1980	1,796		10.1%
1990	2,045		13.9%
2000	2,203		7.7%
2010	2,110		−4.2%
2020	1,952		−7.5%
U.S. Decennial Census

As of the census of 2000, there were 2,203 people, 850 households, and 601 families residing in the town. The population density was 54.9 inhabitants per square mile (21.2/km^{2}). There were 1,098 housing units at an average density of 27.3 per square mile (10.5/km^{2}). The racial makeup of the town was 97.96% White, 0.41% African American, 0.73% Asian, 0.05% Pacific Islander, 0.23% from other races, and 0.64% from two or more races. Hispanic or Latino people of any race were 1.36% of the population.

There were 850 households, out of which 36.6% had children under the age of 18 living with them, 54.7% were married couples living together, 11.1% had a female householder with no husband present, and 29.2% were non-families. 24.7% of all households were made up of individuals, and 10.9% had someone living alone who was 65 years of age or older. The average household size was 2.59 and the average family size was 3.06.

In the town, the population was spread out, with 28.1% under the age of 18, 5.6% from 18 to 24, 27.0% from 25 to 44, 25.4% from 45 to 64, and 13.8% who were 65 years of age or older. The median age was 40 years. For every 100 females, there were 98.8 males. For every 100 females age 18 and over, there were 94.2 males.

The median income for a household in the town was $30,764, and the median income for a family was $38,889. Males had a median income of $28,529 versus $21,111 for females. The per capita income for the town was $17,473. About 9.9% of families and 13.9% of the population were below the poverty line, including 21.6% of those under age 18 and 10.7% of those age 65 or over.

== Communities and locations in Hartwick ==
- Arnold Lake – A lake near the southern town line
- Bowe Hill – An elevation located southeast of Arnold Lake
- Bunn Hill – An elevation east of South Hartwick
- Burke Hill – An elevation located west of Hyde Park
- Chase – A location on County Road 11 in the northeastern part of Hartwick, that once had a trolley line siding
- Cooks – Site of another former trolley siding halfway between Chase and Summit, one of the more scenic sections of the trolley route
- Clintonville – A hamlet in the southeastern part of Hartwick
- Field Crossing – A location on County Road 11 near the northern town line
- Goey Pond – A lake in the southeastern part of the town
- Hartwick – A hamlet located on NY-205 at County Road 11
- Hartwick Reservoir – A small lake east of Hartwick village
- Hartwick Seminary – A hamlet on the eastern town line, south of Hyde Park
- Hawkins Hill – An elevation located east-northeast of the hamlet of Hartwick
- Hemlock Hill – An elevation near the western town line noted for treacherous winter driving conditions
- Hyde Park – A hamlet on the eastern town line, south of Index
- Index – A hamlet on the eastern town line, south of Toddsville. Part is in the town of Otsego.
- Jones Crossing – A hamlet south of Hartwick village on NY-205, once a siding on the Oneonta-Mohawk trolley line
- Perkins Crossing – A location on County Road 11 near the northern town line
- Scotch Hill – A location in the northwest part of Hartwick
- South Hartwick – A hamlet on County Road 11, south of Hartwick village
- Summit Crossing – A location on County Road 11 near the northern town line
- Toddsville – A hamlet at the eastern town line on County Road 26; partly in the town of Otsego. It was once home to a large textile mill.

== Notable people ==
- William H. Bissell, born in Hartwick in 1811, later congressman and governor in Illinois
- Adelaide Mary Branch, teacher, author
- Martin Grover, former U.S. congressman
