= Hartwick (CDP), New York =

Hartwick, New York
- Census-designated place
- Location within the state of New York
- Coordinates: 42°39′34″N 75°2′55″W
- Country: United States
- State: New York
- County: Otsego
- Town: Hartwick

Area
  - Total: 3.46 sq mi (8.95 km^{2})
  - Land: 3.46 sq mi (8.95 km^{2})
  - Water: 0 sq mi (0.00 km^{2})
- Elevation: 1,330 ft (410 m)

Population (2020)
  - Total: 547
  - Density: 158.2/sq mi (61.09/km^{2})
- Time zone: UTC-5 (Eastern (EST))
  - Summer (DST): UTC-4 (EDT)
- Area code: 607
- FIPS code: 36-32578

Hartwick is a census-designated place (CDP) forming the central settlement of the town of Hartwick in Otsego County, New York, United States. It is located at the corner of CR-11 and NY-205. The population of the CDP was 629 at the 2010 census.

== Geography ==
Hartwick is located at 42°39′34″N 75°02′55″W (42.65972, -75.04881).

According to the United States Census Bureau, the CDP has a total area of 3.5 square miles (9.0 km^{2}), all land.

The Otego Creek flows southward through the hamlet.

== Demographics ==
Historical population
Census	Pop.	Note	%±
2020	547		—
U.S. Decennial Census
