= Mount Vision, New York =

- Hamlet and CDP
- Location within New York Location within the United States
- Coordinates: 42°34′42″N 75°03′29″W
- Country: United States
- State: New York
- County: Otsego
- Town: Laurens

Area
  - Total: 1.51 sq mi (3.92 km^{2})
- Elevation: 1,171 ft (357 m)
- Time zone: UTC-5 (Eastern (EST))
  - Summer (DST): UTC-4 (EDT)
- ZIP code: 13810
- Area code: 607
- GNIS feature ID: 957927

Mount Vision is a hamlet (and census-designated place) in Otsego County, New York, United States. As of the 2020 census, Mount Vision had a population of 171. The community is located along New York State Route 205, 8.7 miles (14.0 km) north of Oneonta. Mount Vision has a post office with ZIP code 13810. Mount Vision was formerly known as Jacksonville. A tuberculosis sanatorium was located here in the early 20th century.
