= Tompkins Corners, New York =

Hamlet in New York, United States

Coordinates: 41.399°N 73.802°W

Tompkins Corners is a hamlet in Putnam County, in the U.S. state of New York.

== History ==
The community was named after the brothers Tompkins, who first settled at the site in the 1770s. In the 1840s, Tompkins Corners consisted of merely "a few houses". A post office called Tompkins Corners was established in 1878, and remained in operation until 1954. The Tompkins Corners United Methodist Church was listed on the National Register of Historic Places in 1983.
