= Leatherstocking Falls =

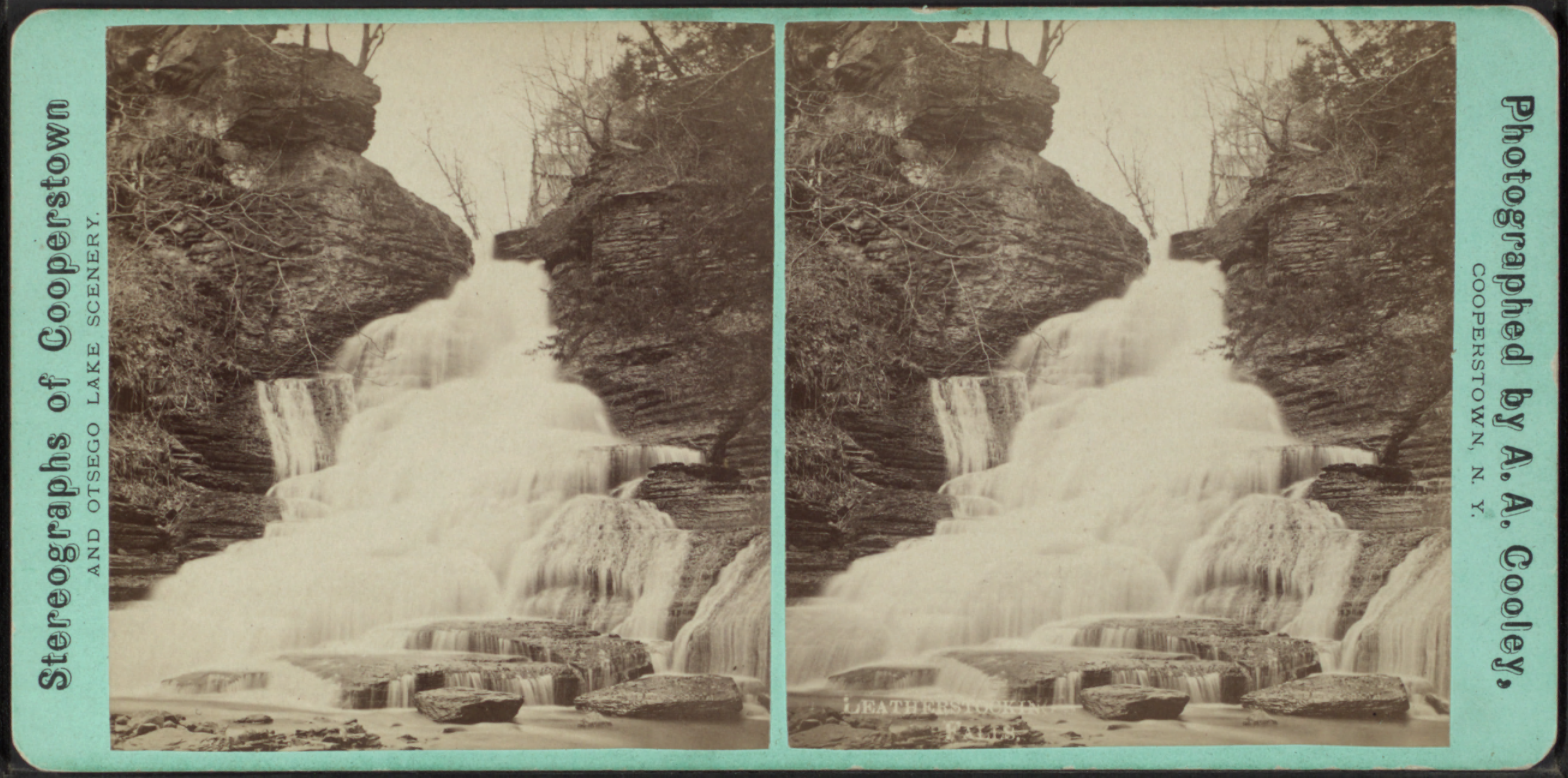
- Picture of Leatherstocking Falls taken between 1865 and 1880

- Location within New York
- Coordinates: 42°43′59″N 74°55′20″W
- Elevation: 1,358 ft (414 m)
- Watercourse: Leatherstocking Creek

Leatherstocking Falls also known as "Panthers Leap", "Bear Cliff Falls" and "Deowongo Falls", is located on Leatherstocking Creek north of Cooperstown, New York. Deowongo translates to "place of hearing", coming from the Oneida Iroquois nation’s language. These falls are where, in James Fenimore Cooper's Leatherstocking Tales, Leatherstocking saves the life of an Indian maiden.

== See also ==
- List of waterfalls
