= Fly Creek, New York =

- Hamlet and CDP
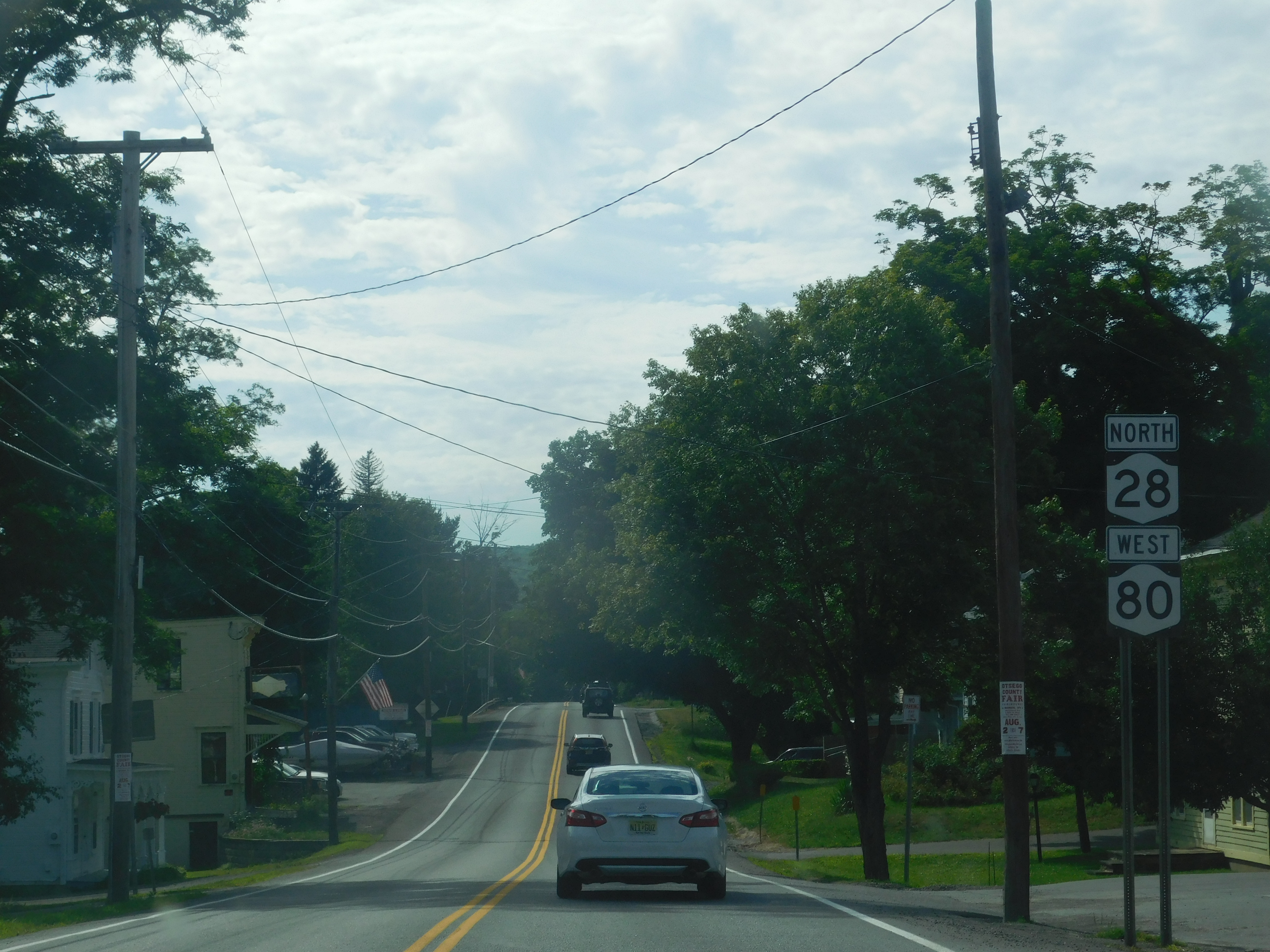
- NY 28 and NY 80 passing west through Fly Creek

- Location within the state of New York Fly Creek, New York (the United States)
- Coordinates: 42°43′06″N 74°59′00″W
- Country: United States
- State: New York
- County: Otsego
- Town: Otsego

Area
  - Total: 1.69 sq mi (4.39 km^{2})
  - Land: 1.64 sq mi (4.26 km^{2})
  - Water: 0.050 sq mi (0.13 km^{2})
- Elevation: 1,302 ft (397 m)
- Time zone: UTC-5 (Eastern (EST))
  - Summer (DST): UTC-4 (EDT)
- ZIP code: 13337
- Area code: 607
- GNIS feature ID: 2804336

Fly Creek is a non-incorporated hamlet (and census-designated place) three miles west of the Village of Cooperstown on conjoined NY-28/NY-80, in the Town of Otsego, in Otsego County, New York, United States. The zipcode is 13337. The Fly Creek Cider Mill and Orchard is located by the hamlet. As of the 2020 census, Fly Creek had a population of 270.

It is the location of the Fly Creek Grange No. 844, which is now a museum. Fly Creek Grange No. 844 is listed on the National Register of Historic Places.

There is also a Fly Creek Historic District, which includes the grange hall.

The hamlet was once served by the Southern New York Railroad, an electric trolley line that ran from Oneonta to Mohawk.
