= Otsego County, New York =

County in New York, United States

- County
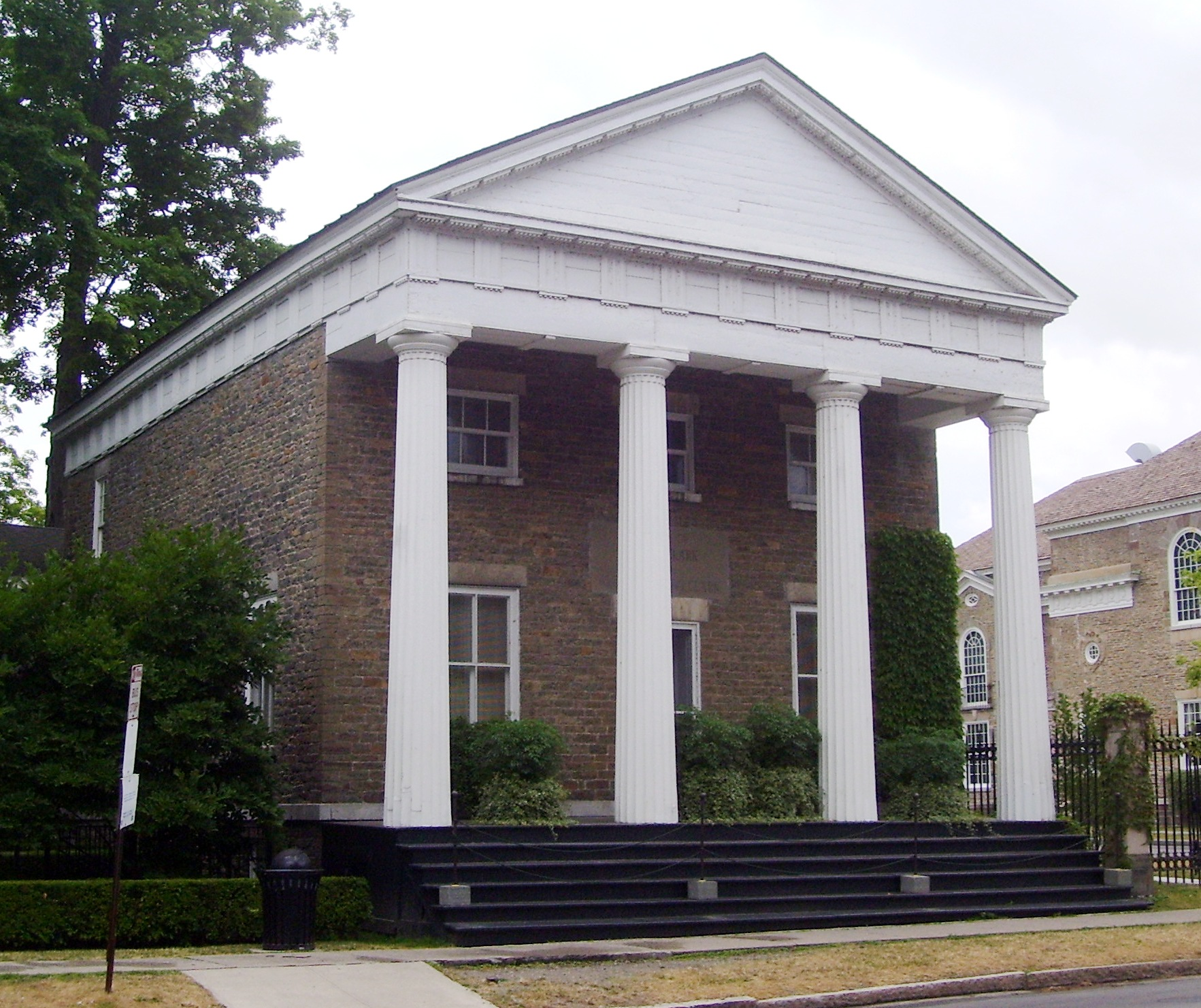
- Original Otsego County Bank, in Cooperstown

- Flag Seal

- Location within the U.S. state of New York
- Coordinates: 42°38′N 75°02′W
- Country: United States
- State: New York
- Founded: February 16, 1791
- Seat: Cooperstown
- Largest city: Oneonta

Area
  - Total: 1,016 sq mi (2,630 km^{2})
  - Land: 1,002 sq mi (2,600 km^{2})
  - Water: 14 sq mi (36 km^{2}) 1.4%

Population (2020)
  - Total: 58,524
  - Estimate (2025): 60,589 ▲
  - Density: 58.4/sq mi (22.5/km^{2})
- Time zone: UTC−5 (Eastern)
  - Summer (DST): UTC−4 (EDT)
- Congressional district: 19th
- Website: www.otsegocounty.com

Otsego County is a county in the U.S. state of New York. As of the 2020 census, the population was 58,524. The county seat is Cooperstown. The county's population center is Oneonta. The name Otsego is from a Mohawk or Oneida word meaning "place of the rock." The county is part of the Mohawk Valley region of the state.

== History ==
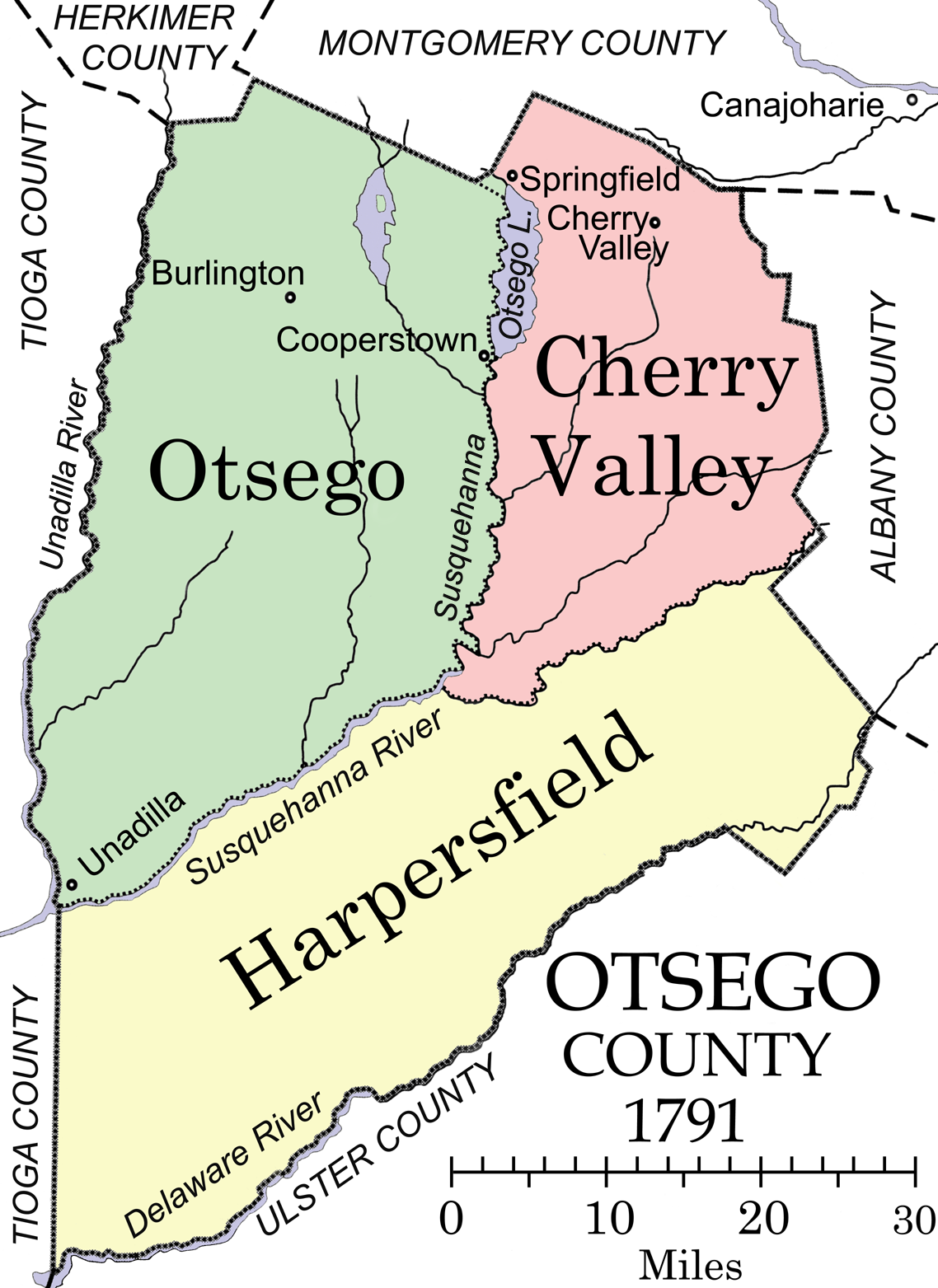
Map of Otsego County, at its formation

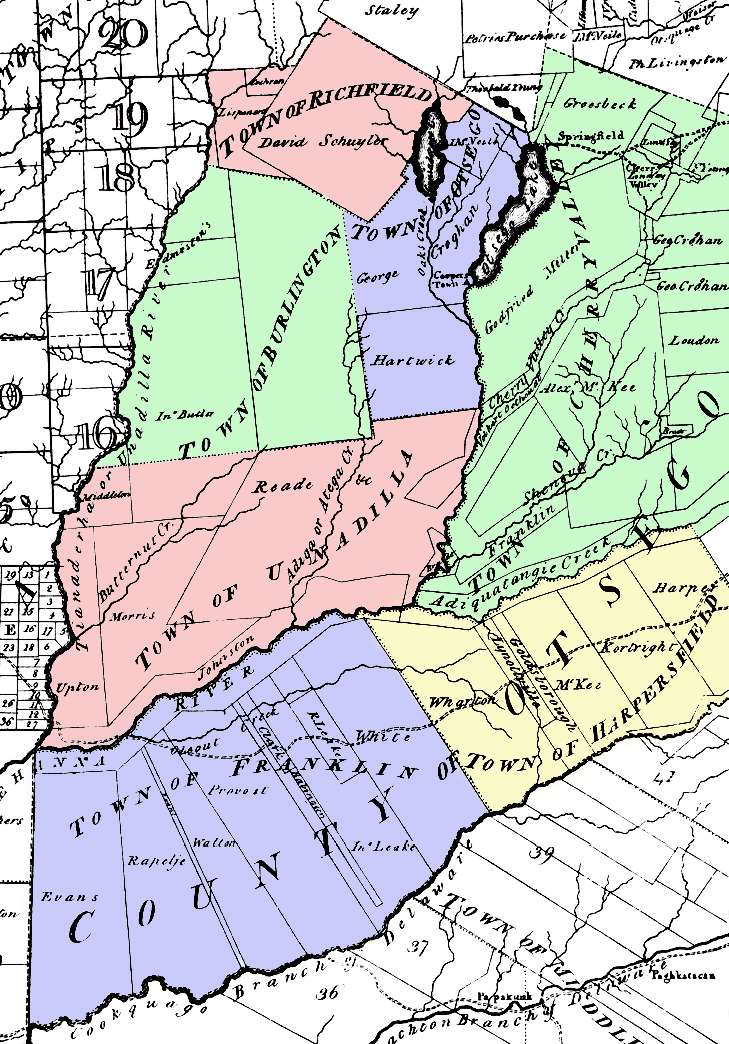
Map of Otsego County, New York, by Simeon De Witt c. 1792-1793

1829 map of Otsego County, New York

In 1789, Ontario County was split off from Montgomery. The area split off from Montgomery County was much larger than the present county, as it included the present Allegany, Cattaraugus, Chautauqua, Erie, Genesee, Livingston, Monroe, Niagara, Orleans, Steuben, Wyoming, Yates, and part of Schuyler and Wayne counties.

=== Formation ===
Otsego County was one of three early counties split off from Montgomery (the other two being Herkimer and Tioga) after the American Revolutionary War. Otsego County was officially established on February 16, 1791, with Cooperstown as its county seat. The original county consisted of three large townships:

- Cherry Valley in the northeast,
- Otsego in the northwest, and
- Harpersfield in the south.

Otsego and Cherry Valley together roughly covered the area of modern Otsego County, while Harpersfield covered the area south of the current county as far as the Delaware River.

Governor George Clinton made the original appointments to Otsego County government positions, including:

- Richard R. Smith, county sheriff, from Otsego township,
- Jacob Morris, county clerk, from Otsego township,
- William Cooper, chief judge, founder of Cooperstown and from Otsego township,
- Jedediah Peck, associate justice from Otsego township,
- Edward Griswold, associate justice from Cherry Valley
- Platt Townsend, associate justice from Harpersfield,
- Alexander Harper, commander of the county militia, from Harpersfield.

=== New towns ===
By 1793, four towns had been added to the county by division of the existing towns:

- The Otsego township had been divided into the towns of:
  - Burlington in the west,
  - Otsego in the northeast,
  - Richfield in the north, and
  - Unadilla in the south.
- Harpersfield had been divided into the towns of:
  - Franklin in the west and
  - Harpersfield in the east.

In 1795, a piece of Otsego County was joined with a portion taken from Albany County to create Schoharie County.

In 1797, a piece of Otsego County was joined with a portion taken from Ulster County to create Delaware County.

In 1843, Otsego County, Michigan was named after the county in New York.

== Geography ==
According to the U.S. Census Bureau, the county has a total area of 1,016 square miles (2,630 km^{2}), of which 1,002 square miles (2,600 km^{2}) is land and 14 square miles (36 km^{2}) (1.4%) is water.

Otsego County is in central New York State, to the west of Albany, southeast of Utica, and northeast of Binghamton. The county is part of the Central New York Region and Mohawk Valley Region of New York State. The county is considered by some to belong to the Southern Tier region of New York State, and is the northernmost county of the Appalachian Region.

=== Adjacent counties ===
- Herkimer County - north
- Montgomery County - northeast
- Schoharie County - east
- Delaware County - south
- Chenango County - southwest
- Oneida County - northwest
- Madison County - northwest

== Demographics ==
Historical population
Census	Pop.	Note	%±
1800	21,343		—
1810	38,802		81.8%
1820	44,856		15.6%
1830	51,372		14.5%
1840	49,628		−3.4%
1850	48,638		−2.0%
1860	50,157		3.1%
1870	48,967		−2.4%
1880	51,397		5.0%
1890	50,861		−1.0%
1900	48,939		−3.8%
1910	47,216		−3.5%
1920	46,200		−2.2%
1930	46,710		1.1%
1940	46,082		−1.3%
1950	50,763		10.2%
1960	51,942		2.3%
1970	56,181		8.2%
1980	59,075		5.2%
1990	60,517		2.4%
2000	61,676		1.9%
2010	62,259		0.9%
2020	58,524		−6.0%
2025 (est.)	60,589	▲	3.5%
U.S. Decennial Census; 1790-1960 1900-1990; 1990-2000 2010-2020

=== 2020 census ===
Otsego County, New York – Racial and ethnic composition Note: the US Census treats Hispanic/Latino as an ethnic category. This table excludes Latinos from the racial categories and assigns them to a separate category. Hispanics/Latinos may be of any race.
Race / Ethnicity (NH = Non-Hispanic)	Pop 1980	Pop 1990	Pop 2000	Pop 2010	Pop 2020	% 1980	% 1990	% 2000	% 2010	% 2020
White alone (NH)	57,938	58,595	58,321	57,734	51,490	98.08%	96.82%	94.56%	92.73%	87.98%
Black or African American alone (NH)	343	757	1,014	958	1,189	0.58%	1.25%	1.64%	1.54%	2.03%
Native American or Alaska Native alone (NH)	70	113	128	103	109	0.12%	0.19%	0.21%	0.17%	0.19%
Asian alone (NH)	207	308	386	660	813	0.35%	0.51%	0.63%	1.06%	1.39%
Native Hawaiian or Pacific Islander alone (NH)	x	x	28	16	7	x	x	0.05%	0.03%	0.01%
Other race alone (NH)	103	24	60	42	180	0.17%	0.04%	0.10%	0.07%	0.31%
Mixed race or Multiracial (NH)	x	x	568	825	2,344	x	x	0.92%	1.33%	4.01%
Hispanic or Latino (any race)	414	720	1,171	1,921	2,392	0.70%	1.19%	1.90%	3.09%	4.09%
Total	59,075	60,517	61,676	62,259	58,524	100.00%	100.00%	100.00%	100.00%	100.00%

=== 2000 census ===
As of the census of 2000, there were 61,676 people, 23,291 households, and 15,115 families residing in the county. The population density was 62 people per square mile (24 people/km^{2}). There were 28,481 housing units at an average density of 28 units per square mile (11/km^{2}). The racial makeup of the county was 95.80% White, 1.75% African American, 0.23% Native American, 0.63% Asian, 0.05% Pacific Islander, 0.50% from other races, and 1.05% from two or more races. Hispanic or Latino of any race were 1.90% of the population. 15.0% were of Irish, 14.9% English, 14.9% German, 11.3% Italian and 9.1% American ancestry according to Census 2000. 95.4% spoke English and 2.1% Spanish as their first language.

There were 23,291 households, out of which 29.60% had children under the age of 18 living with them, 51.10% were married couples living together, 9.50% had a female householder with no husband present, and 35.10% were non-families. 27.00% of all households were made up of individuals, and 11.60% had someone living alone who was 65 years of age or older. The average household size was 2.43 and the average family size was 2.94.

In the county, the population was spread out, with 22.70% under the age of 18, 14.40% from 18 to 24, 24.30% from 25 to 44, 23.60% from 45 to 64, and 15.00% who were 65 years of age or older. The median age was 37 years. For every 100 females there were 93.10 males. For every 100 females age 18 and over, there were 90.00 males.

The median income for a household in the county was $33,444, and the median income for a family was $41,110. Males had a median income of $29,988 versus $22,609 for females. The per capita income for the county was $16,806. About 8.80% of families and 14.90% of the population were below the poverty line, including 15.80% of those under age 18 and 8.20% of those age 65 or over.

== Government and politics ==
United States presidential election results for Otsego County, New York
Year	Republican / Whig		Democratic		Third party(ies)	
Year	No.	%	No.	%	No.	%
1836	2,469	34.79%	4,627	65.21%	0	0.00%
1840	4,856	46.27%	5,580	53.16%	60	0.57%
1844	4,743	42.33%	6,050	53.99%	413	3.69%
1848	3,929	41.00%	3,674	38.34%	1,979	20.65%
1852	4,454	42.11%	5,488	51.89%	634	5.99%
1856	6,373	56.92%	3,595	32.11%	1,229	10.98%
1860	6,543	51.95%	6,051	48.05%	0	0.00%
1864	6,151	50.43%	6,047	49.57%	0	0.00%
1868	6,568	51.95%	6,075	48.05%	0	0.00%
1872	6,236	49.78%	6,275	50.10%	15	0.12%
1876	6,859	49.04%	7,027	50.24%	101	0.72%
1880	7,156	49.10%	7,184	49.29%	235	1.61%
1884	6,871	43.78%	8,307	52.93%	516	3.29%
1888	7,829	50.95%	6,972	45.37%	565	3.68%
1892	7,095	49.49%	6,408	44.70%	833	5.81%
1896	8,161	56.37%	5,820	40.20%	496	3.43%
1900	7,893	54.84%	6,142	42.67%	359	2.49%
1904	7,770	55.44%	5,725	40.85%	519	3.70%
1908	7,459	53.37%	5,975	42.75%	543	3.88%
1912	5,138	40.65%	5,338	42.23%	2,165	17.13%
1916	5,926	48.16%	5,975	48.56%	403	3.28%
1920	12,112	63.88%	6,275	33.09%	574	3.03%
1924	13,573	65.67%	5,841	28.26%	1,256	6.08%
1928	18,286	74.32%	6,006	24.41%	314	1.28%
1932	14,904	64.06%	8,114	34.88%	247	1.06%
1936	16,682	67.36%	7,807	31.52%	276	1.11%
1940	16,771	68.04%	7,798	31.64%	78	0.32%
1944	15,427	66.17%	7,849	33.67%	37	0.16%
1948	15,437	66.55%	7,174	30.93%	586	2.53%
1952	20,304	76.78%	6,115	23.12%	27	0.10%
1956	19,484	77.54%	5,644	22.46%	0	0.00%
1960	17,422	68.73%	7,899	31.16%	26	0.10%
1964	8,643	36.23%	15,190	63.67%	26	0.11%
1968	13,543	59.67%	7,981	35.16%	1,172	5.16%
1972	17,364	68.58%	7,898	31.19%	59	0.23%
1976	14,796	59.77%	9,787	39.54%	171	0.69%
1980	11,814	49.42%	8,795	36.79%	3,298	13.80%
1984	16,777	63.28%	9,582	36.14%	152	0.57%
1988	13,021	53.51%	11,069	45.49%	245	1.01%
1992	10,141	38.12%	10,471	39.36%	5,994	22.53%
1996	8,774	36.37%	11,470	47.54%	3,882	16.09%
2000	12,219	48.19%	11,460	45.19%	1,679	6.62%
2004	13,342	50.06%	12,723	47.74%	587	2.20%
2008	12,026	46.04%	13,570	51.95%	525	2.01%
2012	11,461	47.48%	12,117	50.20%	561	2.32%
2016	13,308	51.85%	10,451	40.72%	1,909	7.44%
2020	14,382	51.22%	12,975	46.21%	723	2.57%
2024	15,256	53.36%	13,031	45.58%	305	1.07%

Otsego County is generally a swing and bellwether county, having voted for the winner of the national election in every election from 1980 to 2016. In 2004, Otsego County voted 51–48 percent in favor of George W. Bush. In 2008 and 2012, Otsego County voted in favor of Barack Obama. Democrats are prevalent in the City of Oneonta and Village of Cooperstown, whereas the majority of voters in many of the surrounding towns are registered Republicans. In 2020 the county voted for 51%-46% Donald Trump, and lost its bellwether status when Biden won the election.

Otsego County is the only county in New York that names its legislative body the Board of Representatives. It consists of fourteen members elected from single-member districts. Representatives then elect a Board Chair. The Board also votes for a county administrator, who manages the operations of county government. There is no independently elected executive in the county. The board is split 7-7 Republicans and Democrats, but a population weighted voting system gave Republicans a 55-45 vote majority entering the 2026 term.

The County Administrator is Steve Wilson. The Board Chair is Edwin Frazier Jr. of Unadilla (R). County Clerk is Jennifer Basile (R). County Treasurer is Allen Ruffles (R). County Sheriff is Richard Devlin Jr. (R). County District Attorney is Christopher DiDonna (R).

== Media ==
Along with Herkimer County and the eastern portion of Oneida County, northern Otsego County is considered part of the Utica television market, while the southern half of the county, including the city of Oneonta, is considered to be in the Binghamton television market.

Oneonta is home to "The Daily Star" newspaper, a daily that prints three times a week with weekly "Cooperstown Crier" and "Weekly Star." Cooperstown is home to AllOtsego.com and its papers "The Freeman's Journal" and "Hometown Oneonta," published weekly.

== Economy ==
The Village of Cooperstown (home of James Fenimore Cooper, and founded by his father, William Cooper) is located at the south end of Otsego Lake. It attracts many tourists to the Baseball Hall of Fame and the New York State Historical Association museums. Cultural attractions also include the Glimmerglass Opera, with a summer season that draws many repeat visitors for stays.

As of 2026, health care and social assistance was the largest employment sector among Otsego County residents. Bassett Medical Center, the headquarters of the Bassett Healthcare Network is located in Cooperstown.

The City of Oneonta has two institutions of higher education: Hartwick College and the State University of New York at Oneonta; A.O. Fox Memorial Hospital, an affiliate of the Bassett Network; major retail activity; and numerous small businesses. The county as a whole remains relatively rural, with dairy farming a contributing industry that has consolidated employment in recent years, although production has remained steady.

== Communities ==
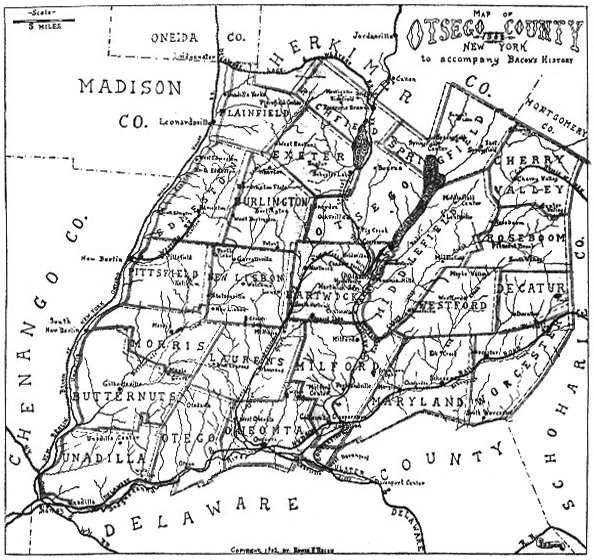
Map of Otsego County NY to accompany Bacon's History 1902

=== City ===
- Oneonta

=== Towns ===
- Burlington
- Butternuts
- Cherry Valley
- Decatur
- Edmeston
- Exeter
- Hartwick
- Laurens
- Maryland
- Middlefield
- Milford
- Morris
- New Lisbon
- Oneonta
- Otego
- Otsego
- Pittsfield
- Plainfield
- Richfield
- Roseboom
- Springfield
- Unadilla
- Westford
- Worcester

=== Villages ===
- Cherry Valley
- Cooperstown (county seat)
- Gilbertsville
- Laurens
- Milford
- Morris
- Otego
- Richfield Springs
- Unadilla

=== Census-designated places ===
- Burlington Flats
- East Worcester
- Edmeston
- Fly Creek
- Garrattsville
- Hartwick
- Hartwick Seminary
- Mount Vision
- Portlandville
- Schenevus
- Schuyler Lake
- South Edmeston
- Springfield Center
- Unadilla Forks
- Wells Bridge
- West End
- Westford
- Worcester

=== Hamlets ===
- East Springfield
- Schuyler Lake
- Silver Lake
- West Burlington
- West Edmeston

== See also ==
- List of counties in New York
- National Register of Historic Places listings in Otsego County, New York
