= Sunken island =

Sunken Island or Sunken island may refer to:

- Lost lands existing or supposedly existing during the past, which have disappeared as a result of natural disasters,

or: a specific geographical place, in the following countries.

Canada

- Sunken Island/Reef, in Canim Lake (British Columbia)
- Sunken Island, New Brunswick,
- Sunken Island, Nova Scotia,
- three different places named Sunken Island in Ontario:
  - an island, at 44.83° north, 76.17° west
  - a sandbank at 44.13° north, 78.28° west
  - a sandbank at 45.79° north, 82.30° west

New Zealand

- Motutara, a usually-submerged island that is exposed if the level of Lake Rotomā drops.

United States

- Sunken Island, Florida
- Sunken Island, New Hampshire
- Sunken Island (Otsego Lake), in Otsego Lake (New York)
- Sunken Island, Vermont
- Sunken Island, Virginia
