= Henry S. F. Cooper Jr. =

American author and journalist (1933–2016)

- Born: November 24, 1933; New York City
- Died: January 31, 2016 (aged 82); Cooperstown, New York
- Education: Buckley School; Phillips Academy Andover; Yale University
- Occupations: Writer, author, environmentalist
- Years active: 1956–1993
- Employer: The New Yorker
- Spouse: Mary Luke Langben (m. 1966, died)
- Children: 3

Henry Spotswood Fenimore Cooper (November 24, 1933 – January 31, 2016) was a writer and local environmentalist. He was a longtime contributor to The New Yorker, predominantly covering NASA's space program. Cooper also wrote eight books about space exploration throughout his lifetime. He was a noted chronicler of events at the Century Association, a private club in New York City.

== Early life ==
Cooper was born on November 24, 1933, in New York City. His parents were Henry Sage Fenimore Cooper, a surgeon at Mary Imogene Bassett Hospital, and Katherine Lemoine Guy. He was the great-great-grandson of writer James Fenimore Cooper and sixth generation descendant of William Cooper, founder of Cooperstown, New York. He had a brother, James Fenimore Cooper IV, and two sisters, Susan and Katherine. James died in 2014 and his sisters died within the year prior to that.

Cooper spent summers throughout his childhood and later life in Cooperstown, and grew up swimming in Otsego Lake and in the surrounding forest and fields. Cooper attributed his interest in science writing to elementary school, where he read a copy of From the Earth to the Moon, an 1865 novel by Jules Verne.

From ages 14 to 22, Cooper worked on his family's farm in the town. Henry S. F. Cooper attended the Buckley School in New York City and Phillips Academy Andover in Massachusetts. He subsequently attended Yale University, graduating with a bachelor's degree in English in 1956. During his stay at Yale, Cooper was a frequent writer for the Yale Daily News, and wrote the column "Sound and Fury". At Yale in 1955, Cooper and David P. Calleo anonymously wrote Inside Eli, or alternatively How to get on at Yale, which had sketches of Yale organizations, activities, and sports; it is currently held by the Beinecke Rare Book & Manuscript Library. The book or pamphlet was written comically, described as resembling the works of Evelyn Waugh.

After graduation, in the summer of 1956, Cooper wrote for the New York Herald Tribune on the persuasion of his mother: Cooper had wished to go to the Middle East, and his mother wanted him to find a job, so Cooper persuaded the Herald Tribune to let him write about his travels in the paper.

== Career ==
Cooper had hoped to work for The New Yorker since he was 16. He submitted two articles after graduating from college and had no immediate response. Around this time, in 1956, Cooper was drafted into the U.S. Army, where he worked as a clerk-typist within the United States before being discharged in 1958.

He then attended the Columbia University Graduate School of Journalism for several months, before hearing from The New Yorker's editor William Shawn. Shawn was impressed with the two articles and hired Cooper, who ended up working for the company for 35 years, from 1958 to 1993. Cooper also wrote for other publications, including The New York Times Book Review. His primary focus at The New Yorker was on the U.S. space program, starting during its period of high publicity in the 1960s. Many of the articles formed the basis of books he later authored.

In 1972, Cooper served as a judge for the National Book Awards. He earned a Guggenheim Fellowship in 1975 and a science writing award from the American Association for the Advancement of Science in 1977.

In 1981, Cooper founded the environmental group Otsego 2000, which campaigned against industrial wind turbines, fracking, and a planned motorboat launching ramp on Otsego Lake in Cooperstown. Originally named "Friends of P.R.O.T.E.C.T.", the organization changed its name to Otsego 2000 in 1998. Cooper was the president of the organization for years, and subsequently became its chairman. Under Cooper, the organization had worked to promote preservation of the Glimmerglass Historic District, the opening of Cooperstown Farmers' Market, and the formation of the Glimmerglass Coalition.

Cooper wrote eight books between 1969 and 1993, with Robert Lescher as his literary agent. Lescher had been an agent to authors such as Robert Frost and Georgia O'Keeffe.

Cooper retired from authorship and writing at The New Yorker in 1993.

Cooper's manuscripts and related materials are collected by the Paul F.Cooper, Jr, Archives at Hartwick College.

== Later life ==
From 2006 to about 2016, Cooper edited The Century Bulletin, a chronicle of events at the Century Association, a private club in New York City.

Cooper died of lung cancer at his home near Cooperstown on January 31, 2016. In May 2016, Otsego 2000 held a month-long exhibition in memory of Cooper, featuring landscapes that could have been lost without Cooper's environmental efforts.

== Personal life and family ==
Henry S. F. Cooper married Mary Luke Langben on October 13, 1966, a relationship that ended in divorce. He had three daughters, Elizabeth, Hannah, and Molly Cooper, and three grandchildren. Cooper lived at 1165 Fifth Avenue, on the Upper East Side of Manhattan. Later in life, Cooper spent more time in Cooperstown, and purchased a house nearby, in Middlefield's Red Creek section.

Cooper was a member of the Yale Club, the Century Association (where he was twice trustee), and the New York Society Library. In Cooperstown, he was a board member of the Glimmerglass Opera, the Otsego Land Trust, and a founder of the Smithy Pioneer Gallery. Cooper was a trustee of the Wrexham Foundation, part of Yale's Manuscript Society. He joined the board in 1957, and was twice its chairman. He was a trustee of the Yale University Art Gallery beginning in 1970, and of the Yale Library Associates beginning in 1976. Cooper was also a member of the Authors Guild, the American Association for the Advancement of Science, the Municipal Art Society, the Grolier Club, and the Coffee House Club.

The New York Society Library considered Cooper the éminence grise of its organization, as he served on its board from 1971 to 2015, and as chair from 1985 to 1992. Cooper also co-wrote and edited a history of the society, The New York Society Library: 250 Years. A study room in the facility was named after him in June 2025.

For the Yale Club, he wrote a comprehensive history of its library, History of the Yale Club Library. Cooper stood as a longtime member of the Yale Club Library Committee.

During the production of the 2004 Wes Anderson film The Life Aquatic, Cooper was in Rome visiting his daughter Molly, then an assistant to producer Barry Mendel. One of the film's actors unexpectedly had a stroke, and with a lack of replacements, Cooper auditioned and got the part in the film.

== Bibliography ==
- Cooper, Henry S. F.; Calleo, David P. (1955). How to get on at Yale. Yale Society for the Occasional Resuscitation of the Harkness Hoot.
- Cooper, Henry S. F. (1969). Apollo on the Moon. Dial Press. ISBN 978-0207954733.
- — (1970). Moon Rocks. Dial Press. ISBN 978-0689819087.
- — (1973). Thirteen: The Flight That Failed. Dial Press. ISBN 978-0803787650.
- — (1976). A House in Space. Holt, Rinehart and Winston. ISBN 978-0030166860.
- — (1980). The Search for Life on Mars: Evolution of an Idea. Holt, Rinehart and Winston. ISBN 978-0030461668.
- — (1983). Imaging Saturn: The Voyager Flights to Saturn. Holt, Rinehart and Winston. ISBN 978-0030616884.
- — (1987). Before Lift-Off: The Training of a Space Shuttle Crew. Johns Hopkins University Press. ISBN 978-0801835247.
- — (1991). Inside the Century: A Guide for New Members and Old. Century Association. Rev. 1997 and 2014.
- — (1993). The Evening Star: Venus Observed. Farrar, Straus and Giroux. ISBN 978-0374150006.
- Cooper, Henry S. F.; Lawrence, Jenny, eds. (2004). The New York Society Library: 250 Years. New York Society Library.
