= Glimmerglass Historic District =

Historic district in New York, United States

- U.S. National Register of Historic Places
- U.S. Historic district
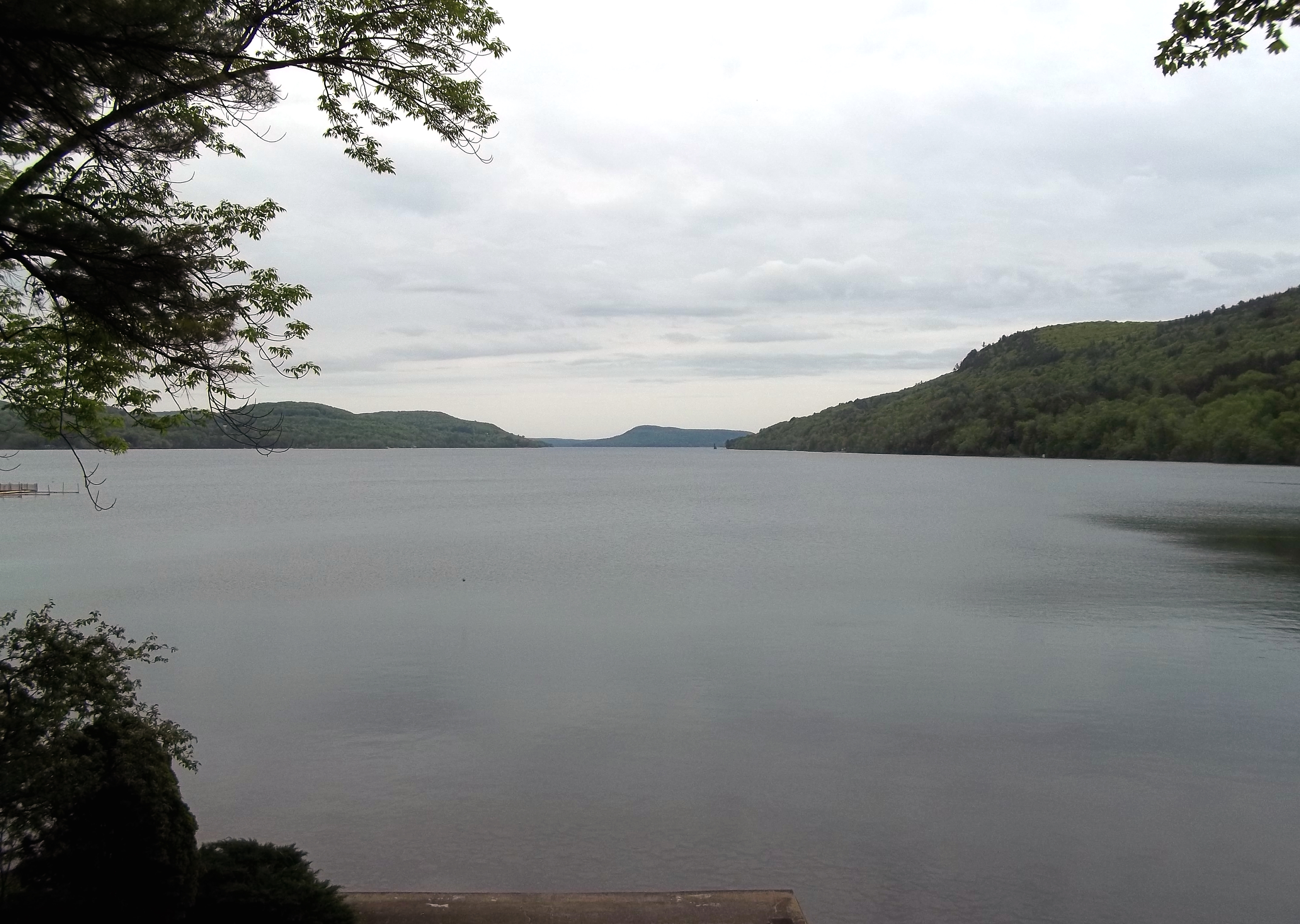
- Otsego Lake

- Location within New York Location within the United States
- Nearest city: Cooperstown, New York
- Coordinates: 42°45′20″N 74°54′24″W
- Area: 15,000 acres (6,100 ha)
- Architect: multiple
- Architectural style: Early Republic, Mid 19th Century Revival, et al.
- NRHP reference No.: 99001136
- Added to NRHP: September 24, 1999

Glimmerglass Historic District is a national historic district located near Cooperstown in Otsego County, New York. The 15,000-acre (61 km^{2}) district encompasses parts of three towns, Otsego, Springfield, and Middlefield and the village of Cooperstown. It encompasses the physical and social sphere of Otsego Lake and its immediate environs. It includes 1,475 contributing features, some of which were previously listed including the Cooperstown Historic District, U.S. Post Office (Cooperstown, New York), and Hyde Hall in Glimmerglass State Park.

It was listed on the National Register of Historic Places in 1999.
