= Clarke Point =

- Cape
- Location within New York Clarke Point (the United States)
- Coordinates: 42°47′29″N 74°52′45″W
- Location: North of Cooperstown, New York
- Offshore water bodies: Otsego Lake
- Elevation: 363 m (1,191 ft)
- Topo map: Richfield Springs

Clarke Point, also known as Shad Cam, is a geographic cape extending into Otsego Lake in Otsego County in the U.S. State of New York. It is located in the Town of Springfield, north of the Village of Cooperstown and south of the Hamlet of Springfield Center. Clarke Point makes up the southern tip of Mount Wellington and marks the northern edge of Hyde Bay. It can be accessed via Hyde Hall or by boat.

== History ==
The name Shad Cam had been named so by the Cooper Family. It was named after a fisherman of Scottish descent who at this point said to the Coopers, "Why, boys, in those days the shad cam up to that point."
