= Burning of Springfield (1778) =

The Burning of Springfield or Springfield Raid was a frontier attack in New York during the American Revolutionary War that tool place on June 18, 1778. The raid, led by Joseph Brant, destroyed the settlement, which is presently Springfield in Otsego County, New York. All dwellings but one were burned, into which all the women and children were moved into for safety during the attack. Brant reportedly destroyed the settlement without loss of life on either side. The village was then used by Brant as a base of operations.
