= Peggs Point =

Geographic feature in New York State, USA

- Cape
- Location within New York Peggs Point (the United States)
- Coordinates: 42°46′41″N 74°52′43″W
- Location: Cooperstown, New York
- Offshore water bodies: Otsego Lake
- Elevation: 370 m (1,214 ft)
- Topo map: Richfield Springs

Peggs Point is a geographic cape extending into Otsego Lake in the Town of Middlefield in Otsego County in the U.S. State of New York. It is located on the east shore of the lake north of the Village of Cooperstown. The point forms the southern edge of Hyde Bay which is located north.

== History ==
In August 2018 a home located on Peggs Point owned by rapper Pete Nice was sold at auction due to unpaid taxes.

== Appearance in literature ==
In the novel The Deerslayer, Peggs Point is the location where Deerslayer and Hurry Harry first reach the shore of Otsego Lake. Then later the novel it is the location where the British troops rescue Deerslayer's friends, and Deerslayer finally leaves the lake. By sunset the troops were already encamped on the hills towards the Mohawk Valley fort. Chingachgook preceded the Deerslayer towards where the trails split to the fort or to the Delaware Indians. Deerslayer was not sure what trail to take but at the end chose to join the Delawares.
