= Mount Vision =

Mount Vision may refer to:

- Mount Vision (Antarctica), a summit in Antarctica
- Mount Vision (New York), a summit east of Cooperstown in Otsego County, New York
- Mount Vision, New York, a hamlet in Otsego County, New York
- Mount Vision Fire, a 1995 wildfire in Northern California
