= Hayden Creek (New York) =

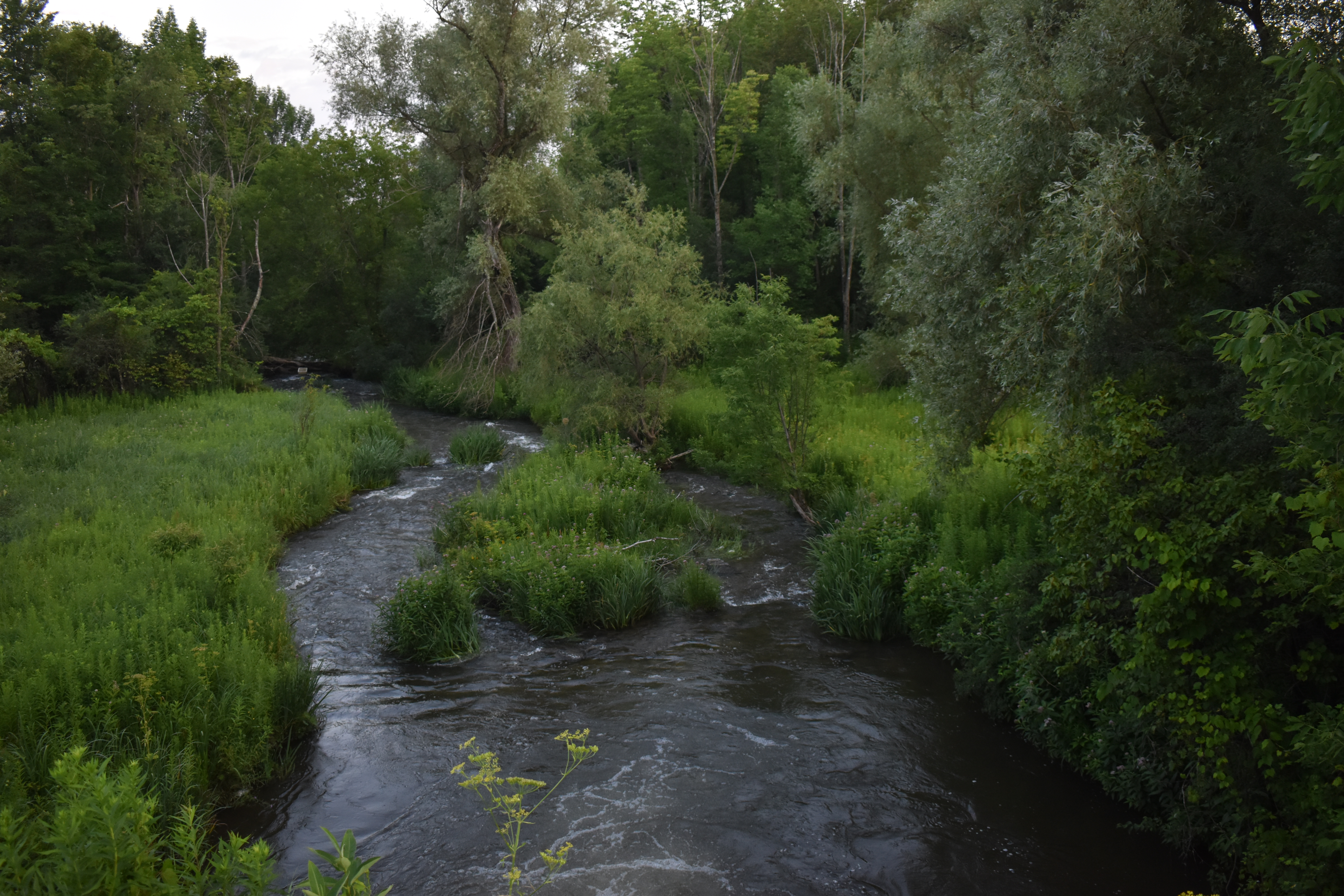
- Hayden Creek downstream of County Route 53

- Location of the mouth of Hayden Creek Hayden Creek (New York) (the United States)

Location
- Country: United States
- State: New York
- Region: Central New York
- County: Otsego
- Town: Springfield

Physical characteristics
- Source
  - location: NNW of East Springfield
  - coordinates: 42°52′05″N 74°49′18″W
- Mouth: Otsego Lake
  - location: S of Springfield Center
  - coordinates: 42°48′48″N 74°53′20″W
  - elevation: 1,194 ft (364 m)
- Basin size: 10 sq mi (26 km^{2})

Basin features
- Progression: Hayden Creek → Otsego Lake → Susquehanna River → Chesapeake Bay → Atlantic Ocean

Hayden Creek is a river in Otsego County, in the U.S. State of New York. It begins north-northwest of the Hamlet of East Springfield and flows generally southward before flowing into Otsego Lake south of the Hamlet of Springfield Center.

== Course ==
Hayden Creek begins northeast of the Hamlet of Springfield Center and flows southwest before flowing into Summit Lake. It then exits the lake and flows southward, crossing under U.S. Route 20, and then flows into Shipman Pond. It then exits the pond and continues flowing southward through Springfield Center before flowing into Otsego Lake south of Springfield Center.

== Fishing ==
Suckers can be speared and taken in the section of the creek from the mouth to the Shipman Pond dam from January 1 to May 15, each year.
