= East Springfield Union School =

- U.S. National Register of Historic Places
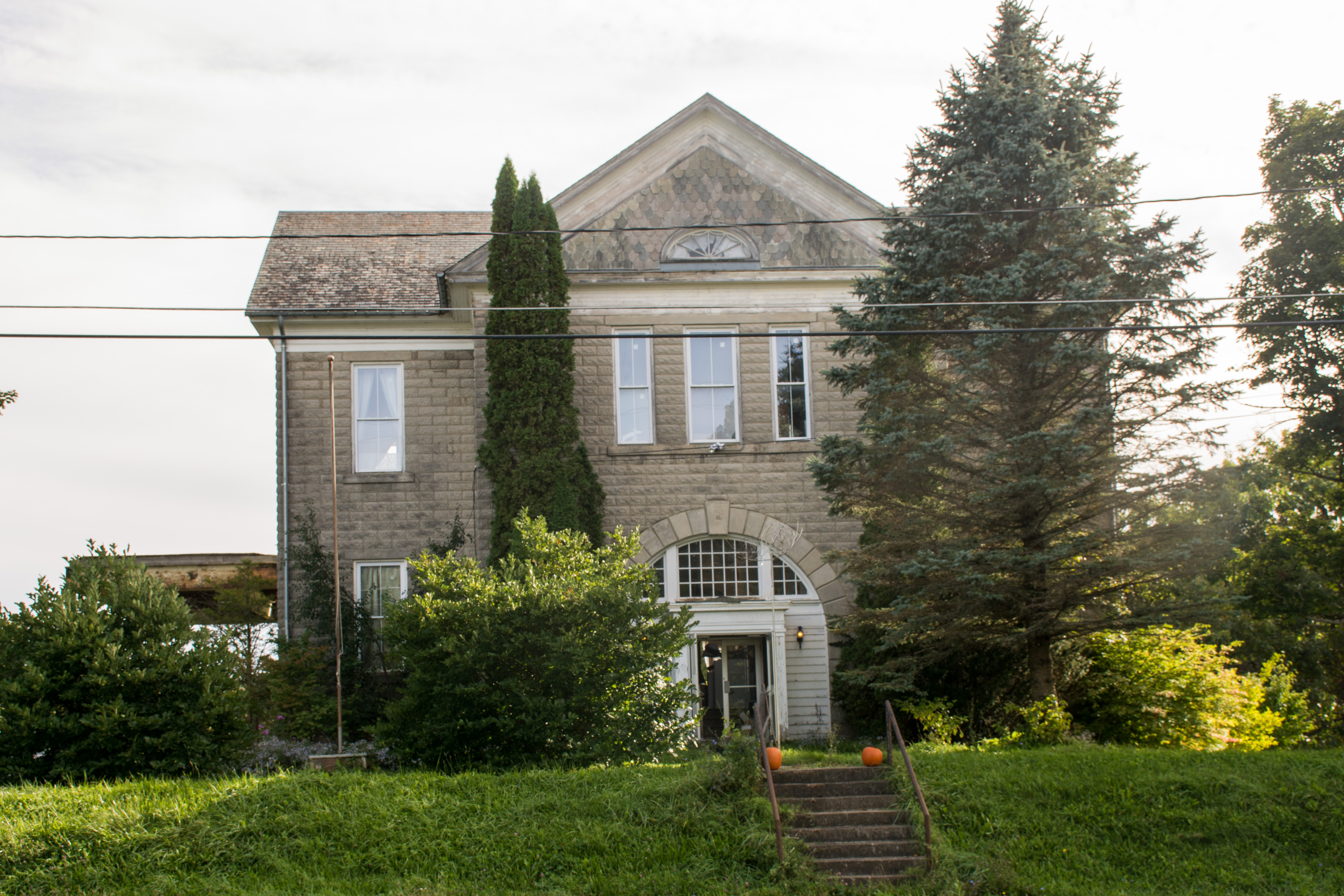
- East Springfield Union School

- Location within New York Location within the United States
- Location: Approximately .5 mi. E of jct. of US 20 and Co. Rd. 31, East Springfield, New York
- Coordinates: 42°49′50″N 74°48′44″W
- Area: 2.8 acres (1.1 ha)
- Built: 1909
- Architect: Warner, Mr.
- Architectural style: Classical Revival
- NRHP reference No.: 96000483
- Added to NRHP: April 26, 1996

East Springfield Union School, also known as Springfield Central School, is a historic school building located at East Springfield in Otsego County, New York. It was built in two stages, starting in 1909. The original front section is a two-story, "T" plan, cross gabled Neoclassical style building executed in rusticated concrete block and set on a half raised basement. The rear portion is a single story utilitarian concrete block structure built in 1936. The main facade includes a protruding, full height central gable, its pediment featuring an Adamesque lunette window, fishscale slates, and a heavy wood cornice. The school closed in 1989.

It was listed on the National Register of Historic Places in 1996.
