= Kingfisher Tower =

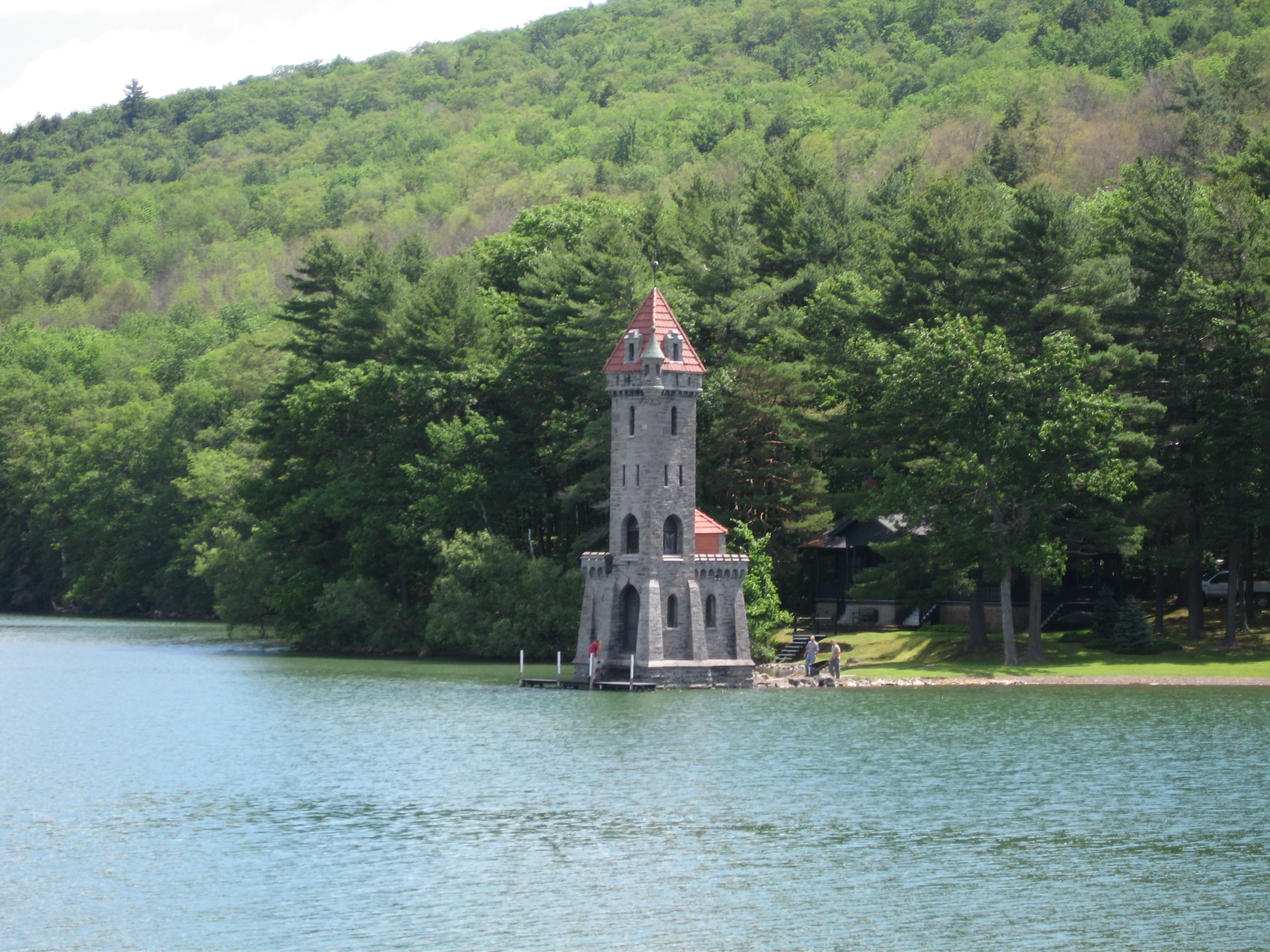
- Kingfisher Tower and Point Judith in 2006

- Location within New York Location within the United States
- 42°43′40″N 74°54′21″W
- Type: Folly
- Location: North of Cooperstown, New York

History
- Built: 1876

Site notes
- Elevation: 1,201 ft (366 m)
- Height: 60 ft (18 m)
- Architect: Henry J. Hardenbergh
- Architectural style: Gothic Revival

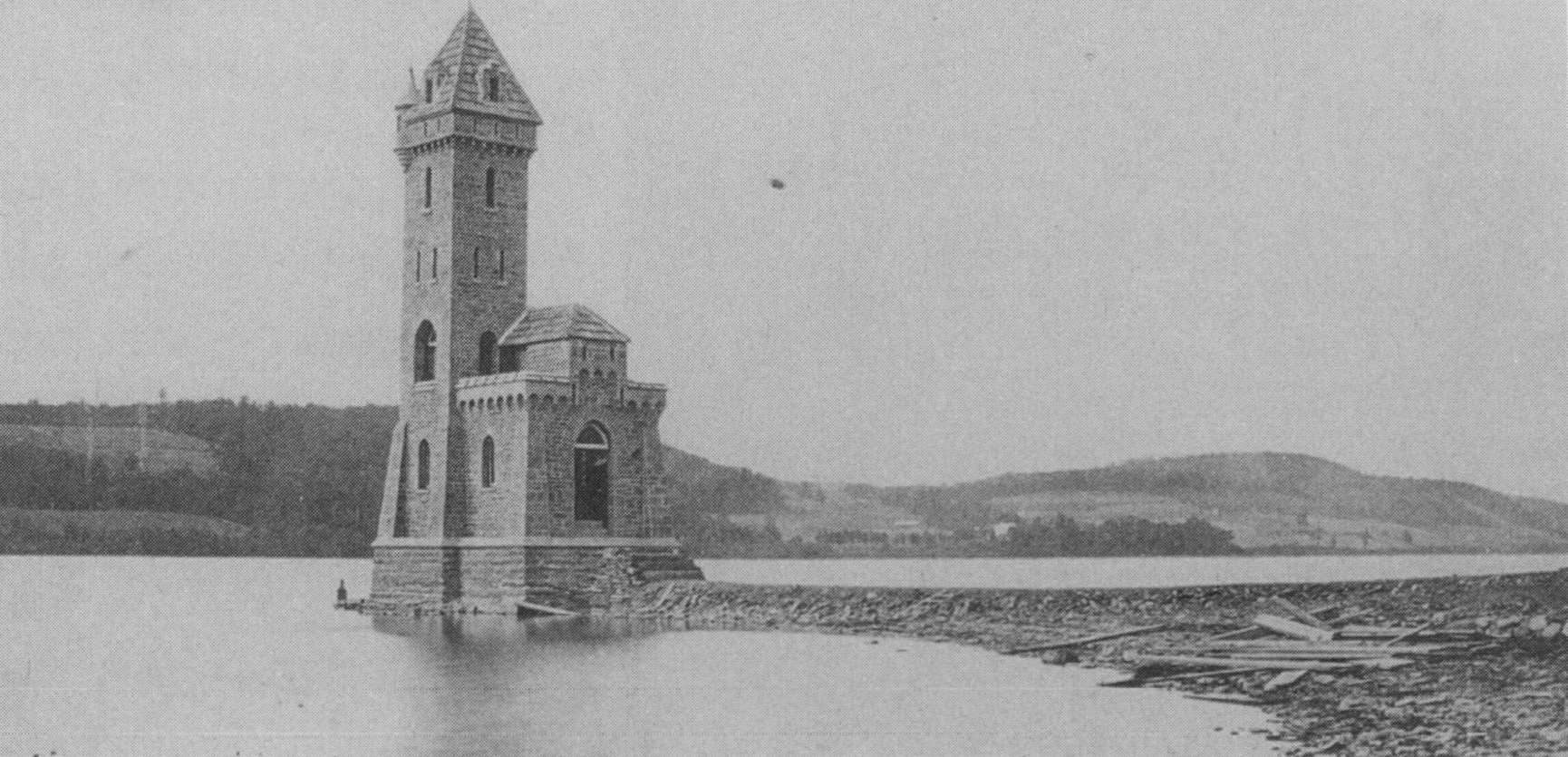
Kingfisher Tower on Otsego Lake c. 1880

Kingfisher Tower is a 60-foot-tall (18 m) folly on the eastern shore of Otsego Lake, New York, at Point Judith. Located north of Cooperstown near County Highway 31, the Gothic Revival tower was designed by architect Henry J. Hardenbergh for Singer Sewing Machine Company magnate Edward Clark in 1876, who built it "to beautify the lake" and "provide construction jobs during an economic turndown".

The property is still owned by his descendants, and is usually approachable only from the lake. A movie was made there in 1913.
