= Three Mile Point =

- Cape
- Location within New York Three Mile Point (the United States)
- Coordinates: 42°44′29″N 74°54′31″W
- Location: North of Cooperstown, New York
- Offshore water bodies: Otsego Lake
- Elevation: 368 m (1,207 ft)
- Topo map: Cooperstown

Three Mile Point also known as Wild Rose Point is a geographic cape extending into Otsego Lake in the Town of Otsego in Otsego County in the U.S. State of New York. It is located north of the Village of Cooperstown and is accessible via State Route 80. In the summer months it is also a public swimming beach and offers changing rooms, a picnic area, and a pavilion. In the winter months it serves as a place for ice fishers to park.

== History ==
The author James Fenimore Cooper returned from Europe to live in Cooperstown, NY in 1836. His father, Judge William Cooper's estates in that town had been sold off by 1823 and by 1832 his son, James Fenimore Cooper then living in Europe with his family had begun the process of re-acquiring them. When he returned, he noticed that Three Mile Point which he owned was being used as public property, and that there had been extensive vandalism. In a magazine article that Cooper wrote in 1837, he said "The public cut down a tree that had a peculiar association connected with my father, and which I would not have permitted to be cut down for any ordinary reason." James was angered by the vandalism, and in July 1837 placed an announcement in the Freeman's Journal. It said "the public is warned against trespassing on the three mile point... has not, nor has ever had, any right to the same, beyond what has been conceded by the liberality of the owners." Few residents of the Village of Cooperstown viewed it as being owned by the Cooper family, and many were outraged. A public meeting was held to denounce James Fenimore Cooper for closing the point, said Judge Cooper had left it to the community, and requested Cooper's works be removed from the village library. The New York press used the story to denounce Cooper as an "aristocratic snob". Cooper's successful libel suits against these papers contributed to the development of New York libel law. Cooper included it in detail in his novel Home as Found, which describes the differences in social climates of New York City and Cooperstown as Cooper saw them.

Three Mile Point remained in the Cooper family until it passed to William Storrs Cooper. In 1871 he leased it to the Village of Cooperstown. In 1899 a public appeal raised money to acquire the point for the village, and has since been a public park. In 1904 the northern edge was purchased by Adolphus Busch and he built a boathouse. In 1928 a proposal was made by the Busch family to acquire the remaining parts of the point, in exchange for property further up the lake. This was soon rejected by the Village of Cooperstown trustees.

== Appearance in literature ==
In The Deerslayer, Three Mile Point is the location where Hetty Hutter docks to seek the Huron Indian camp which was further south at Muskrat Cove. She was going to the camp to plea for her father's release. Then later in the novel, it is the site of the second Huron camp where Chingachgook rescues Hist (Wah-ta-Wah) and Deerslayer, but Deerslayer is captured. As Cooper describes it:

The whole projection into the lake contained about two acres of land, and the part that formed the point, and on which the camp was placed, did not compose a surface of more than half that size. It was principally covered with oaks.... Beneath, except the fringe of thick bushes along the shore, there was very little underbrush.... The surface of the land was tolerably even, but it had a small rise near its centre, which divided it into a northern and southern half.... A brook also came brawling down the sides of the adjacent hills, and found its way into the lake on the southern side of the point. It had cut for itself a deep passage through some of the higher portions of the ground, and, in later days, when this spot has become subjected to the uses of civilization, by its windings and shaded banks, it has become no mean accessory in contributing to the beauty of the place.... There was a delicious spring on the northern side of the point.... (Chapter 16)

In Home as Found, Three Mile Point is referred to as Fishing Point. The Effingham family have the same controversy over the point that Cooper had in real life. The family discussed in chapter 14: "That point has been ours ever since civilized man has dwelt among these hills; who will presume to rob us of it?".
