= Blackbird Bay =

Freshwater bay in Otsego County, New York, USA

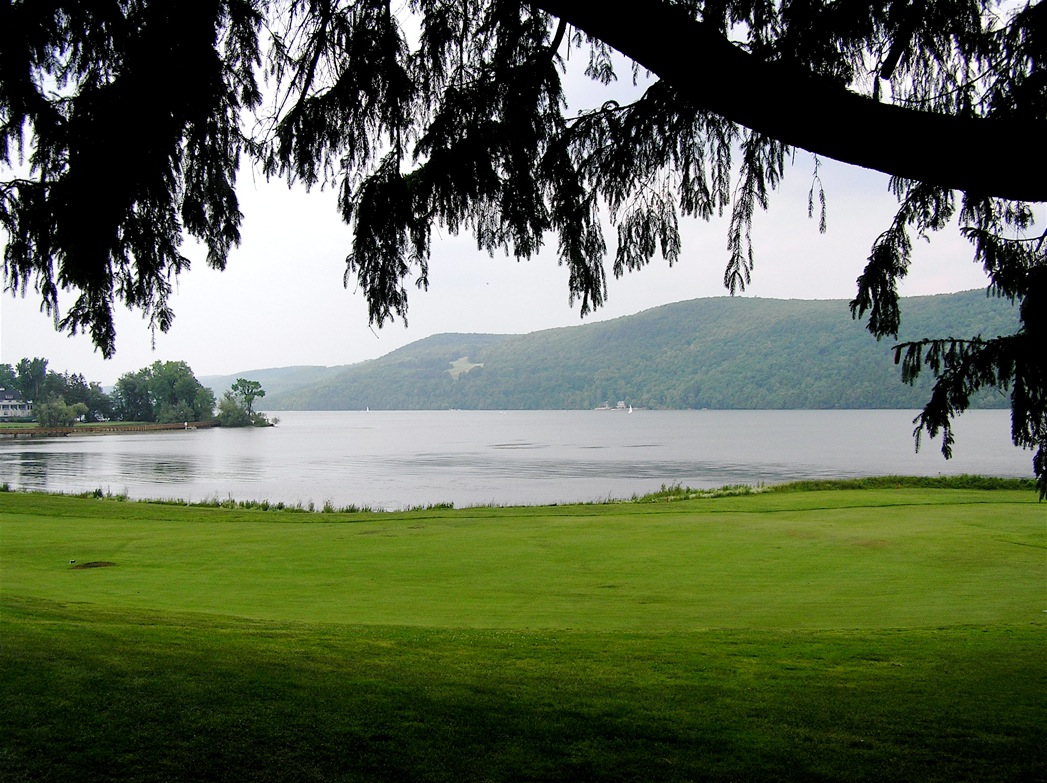
- View of Blackbird Bay.

- Location within New York Blackbird Bay (the United States)
- Location: Cooperstown, New York, U.S.
- Coordinates: 42°42′23″N 74°55′32″W
- Type: Bay
- Part of: Otsego Lake
- Surface elevation: 1,191 ft (363 m)

Blackbird Bay is a bay located on Otsego Lake. It is located in the Village of Cooperstown in the U.S. state of New York. The historic Otesaga Hotel is located on the shore as well as the Leatherstocking Golf Course.

== Appearances in literature ==
In The Pioneers, the point on the northern shore of Blackbird Bay is the site of an annual bass fishing expedition. Residents of the Village of Cooperstown then used nets to catch 1,000 Otsego bass, as well as other fish species in the lake in chapter 23. It is also the location where Natty Bumppo rescues the sailor Ben Pump from drowning in chapter 24.
