= Glimmer Glen Creek =

- Location of the mouth of Glimmer Glen Creek Glimmer Glen Creek (the United States)

Location
- Country: United States
- State: New York
- Region: Central New York Region
- County: Otsego
- Town: Otsego

Physical characteristics
- Mouth: Otsego Lake
  - location: N of Cooperstown
  - coordinates: 42°43′12″N 74°55′31″W
  - elevation: 1,191 ft (363 m)

Basin features
- Progression: Glimmer Glen Creek → Otsego Lake → Susquehanna River → Chesapeake Bay → Atlantic Ocean

Glimmer Glen Creek is a creek in central Otsego County, New York. It flows into Otsego Lake north of Cooperstown, New York and south of Brookwood Point.
