= Chyle Hole =

Hole in New York, United States

- Hole
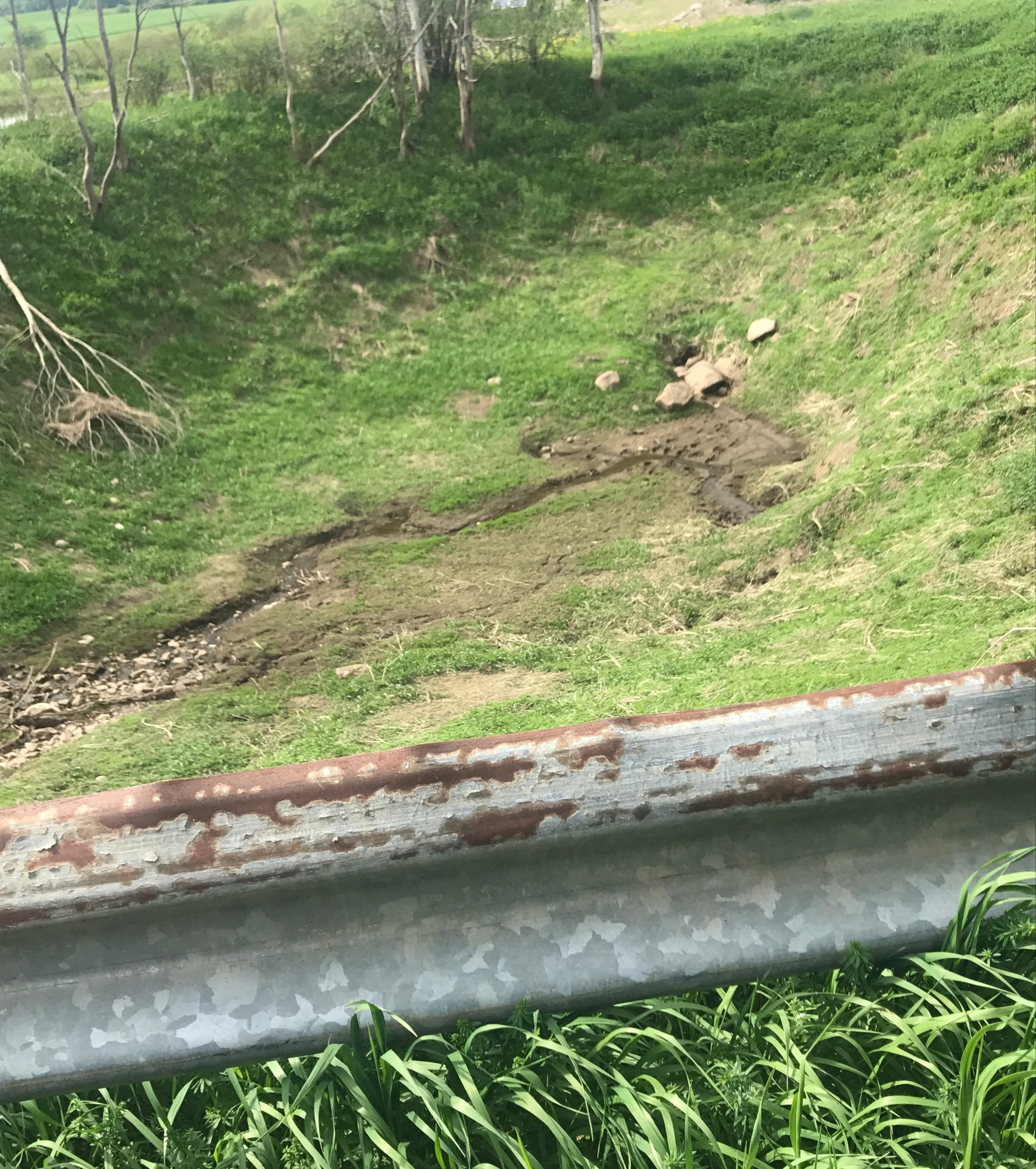
- The Chyle in May 2018
- Interactive map of Chyle Hole
- Coordinates: 42°52′55″N 74°52′56″W
- Location: NE of Warren, New York

Dimensions
  - Width: 75 feet (23 m)
  - Depth: 12 feet (3.7 m)
- Elevation: 480 m (1,570 ft)

Chyle Hole or Kyle is a depression or hole where a stream disappears. It is located in the Town of Springfield north of Chyle Road by the Warren town line. It was known to the Indians as Theogsowone which translates to "wedge".

The bottoms and sides of Chyle Hole are limestone, partially covered with earth. There are 2 or 3 cracks in the bottom that the water flows into during heavy rain or snow melt. Sometimes it fills and covers an area up to 3 acres (0.0047 mi^{2}) with a lake that eventually drains into the hole.

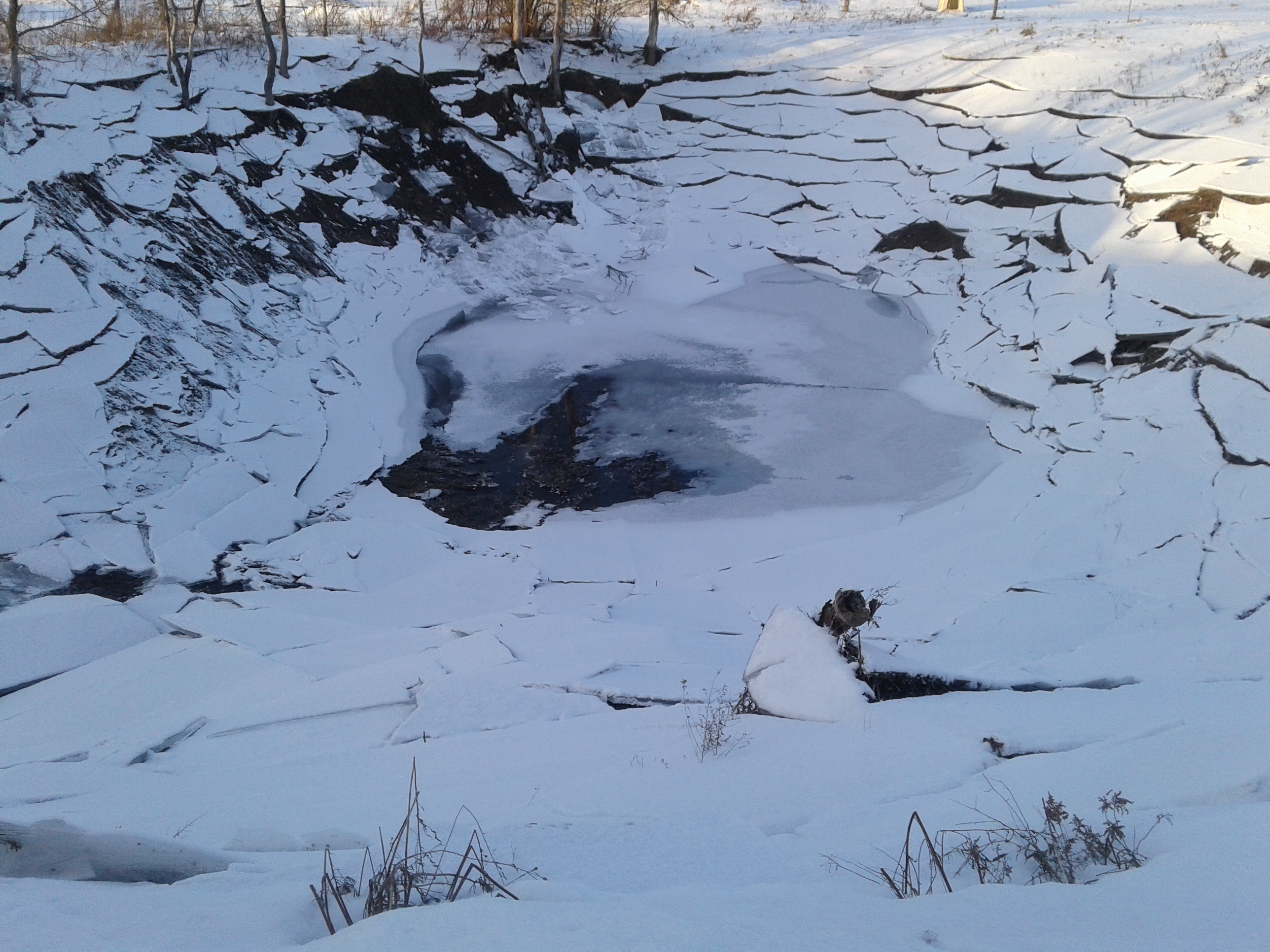
Chyle after water drained and ice collapsed in December 2018
