= Sunken Island (Otsego Lake) =

Sunken island in Otsego County, New York

- Sunken Island in Otsego Lake

- Location within New York Adirondack Park Location within the United States

Geography
- Location: Otsego Lake
- Coordinates: 42°47′43″N 74°53′33″W
- Highest elevation: 1,191 ft (363 m)

Administration
- United States
- State: New York
- Region: Central New York Region
- County: Otsego
- Town: Springfield

Sunken Island, also known as Hutters Island, is a sunken island on Otsego Lake in Otsego County, New York. Sunken Island is several feet below the surface of the lake and is marked with 4 buoys to prevent boats from running aground. Sunken Island is described in the writings of James Fenimore Cooper upon which a structure once stood.
