= Brookwood Creek =

- Location of the mouth of Brookwood Creek Brookwood Creek (the United States)

Location
- Country: United States
- State: New York
- Region: Central New York Region
- County: Otsego
- Town: Otsego

Physical characteristics
- Mouth: Otsego Lake
  - location: N of Cooperstown
  - coordinates: 42°43′35″N 74°54′59″W
  - elevation: 1,191 ft (363 m)

Basin features
- Progression: Brookwood Creek → Otsego Lake → Susquehanna River → Chesapeake Bay → Atlantic Ocean

Brookwood Creek is a creek in central Otsego County, New York. It flows into Otsego Lake north of Cooperstown, New York at Brookwood Point.
