= Summit Lake (Springfield, Otsego County, New York) =

Lake in Otsego County, New York

- Location of Summit Lake within New York State
- Location: Otsego County, New York
- Coordinates: 42°51′39″N 74°50′56″W
- Primary inflows: Hayden Creek
- Primary outflows: Hayden Creek
- Surface area: 63 acres (25 ha)
- Surface elevation: 1,348 feet (411 m)
- Settlements: Springfield Center

Summit Lake is a small lake in Otsego County, New York. It is located northeast of Springfield Center. Summit Lake is unique, as it drains south via Hayden Creek which flows into Otsego Lake as well as north toward the Mohawk River. Fish species present in the lake include largemouth bass, chain pickerel, brown bullhead and yellow perch.

== Geology ==
A subterranean passage drains from the bottom of the lake on the northern part. This shows that a subsurface drainage divide exists and drains to the north. Outlet streams flow both north toward the Mohawk River and south toward Otsego Lake from Summit Lake. A disappearing stream is located slightly northwest of the lake. Summit Lake spring, also known as the cold spring, feeds a tributary that enters the east side of the lake. It is estimated that the spring discharges approximately 10 gallons per minute.
