= Gravelly Point (Otsego Lake) =

- Cape
- Location within New York Gravelly Point (the United States)
- Coordinates: 42°46′14″N 74°52′56″W
- Location: North of Cooperstown, New York
- Offshore water bodies: Otsego Lake
- Elevation: 371 m (1,217 ft)
- Topo map: Richfield Springs

Gravelly Point is a geographic cape extending into Otsego Lake in Middlefield, New York. It is located on the east side of the lake, roughly 5 miles (8.0 km) north of the Village of Cooperstown. The point is not accessible from land but only the lake.

== Appearance in literature ==
Gravelley Point is mentioned in chapter seven of The Deerslayer. Natty Bumppo was paddling after his drifting canoe, and once he reaches it he landed on Gravelly Point. When he lands on the point he is fired upon by a Huron Indian who wants to seize the canoe, and Deerslayer returned fire. As the Huron was dying, he asked Deerslayer what his name was. Deerslayer replied to him, that he was called Deerslayer though when he returned from war he shall gain a more manly title. The Huron said that it was a good name for a boy but not a warrior, and he then said "No Deerslayer... Hawkeye, Hawkeye, Hawkeye". The Huron then died and Deerslayer gained a new name, but continued to be referred to as Deerslayer throughout the novel.
