= Point Florence =

- Cape
- Location within New York Point Florence (the United States)
- Coordinates: 42°44′05″N 74°53′54″W
- Offshore water bodies: Otsego Lake
- Elevation: 365 m (1,197 ft)
- Topo map: Cooperstown

Point Florence is a geographic cape extending into Otsego Lake in the Town of Otsego north of Cooperstown, New York.
