= Point Judith (Otsego Lake) =

Geographic cape in Otsego, New York, U.S.

- Cape
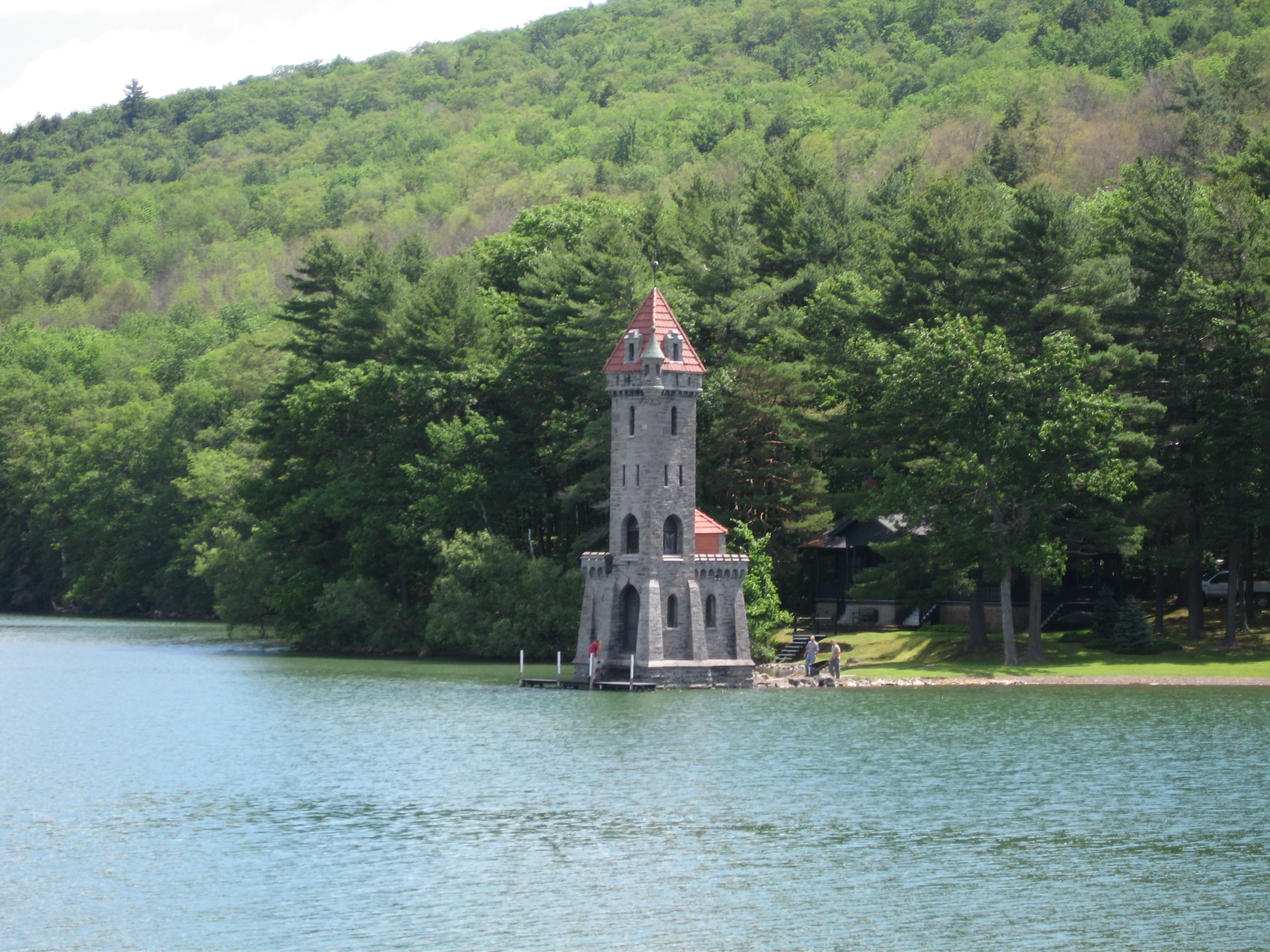
- Point Judith and Kingfisher Tower in 2006

- Location within New York Point Judith (the United States)
- Coordinates: 42°43′42″N 74°54′20″W
- Offshore water bodies: Otsego Lake
- Elevation: 366 m (1,201 ft)
- Topo map: Cooperstown

Point Judith, also known as Kingfisher Point, is a geographic cape extending into Otsego Lake in the Town of Otsego north of Cooperstown, New York. Kingfisher Tower is located on the lake off Point Judith.

Originally it was called Two Mile Point, but the point's present name is derived from Judith Hutter from The Deerslayer.

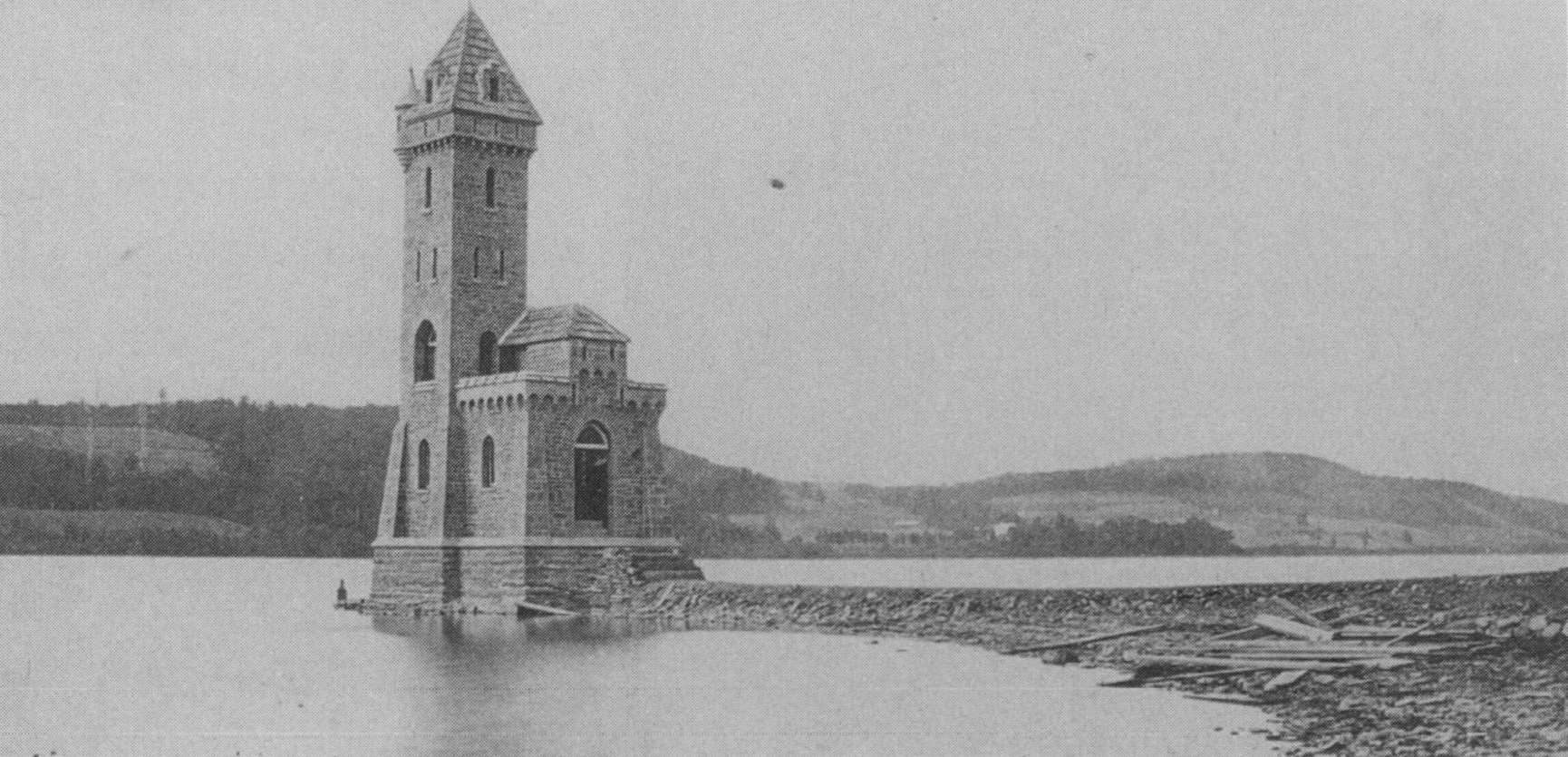
Kingfisher Tower on Point Judith c. 1880
