= Glimmerglass State Park =

State Park in Otsego County, New York

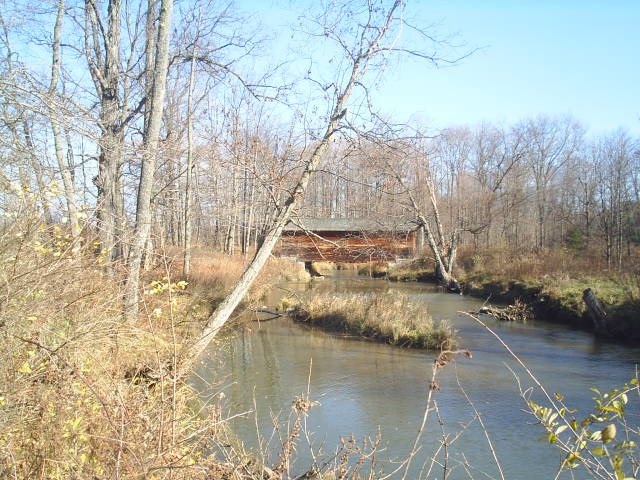
- The covered bridge at Glimmerglass State Park in November 2004.

- Location within New York
- Type: State park
- Location: 1527 County Highway 31; Cooperstown, New York
- Nearest city: Cooperstown, New York
- Coordinates: 42°47′38″N 74°51′58″W
- Area: 593 acres (2.40 km^{2})
- Created: 1963
- Operator: New York State Office of Parks, Recreation and Historic Preservation
- Visitors: 153,882 (in 2014)
- Open: All year
- Website: Glimmerglass State Park

Glimmerglass State Park is a 593-acre (2.40 km^{2}) state park located north of Cooperstown, in Otsego County, New York. Most of the park is located inside the Town of Springfield.

== Park description ==
Glimmerglass State Park is located at Hyde Bay on the east shore of Otsego Lake, which is the "Glimmerglass" lake of James Fenimore Cooper's Leatherstocking Tales. The Hyde Hall mansion overlooks the bay and most of the grounds.

The park offers a beach, picnic tables with pavilions, a playground, recreation programs, a nature trail, hiking and biking, fishing and ice fishing, a campground with tent and trailer sites, ice skating, cross-country skiing and snowmobiling and a food concession. The park is open year-round.

== Triathlon ==
Until 2019 the park had hosted the Cooperstown/Glimmerglas triathlon for many years.

== See also ==
- List of New York state parks
