= Mount Vision (New York) =

Mountain in New York, United States

- Location within New York Location within the United States

Highest point
- Elevation: 1,722 feet (525 m)
- Coordinates: 42°41′59″N 74°54′42″W

Geography
- Location: Cooperstown, New York City
- Topo map: USGS

Mount Vision is a mountain in Central New York region of New York by Cooperstown. Mount Vision was named by Judge Cooper. Mount Vision is where Cooper's father first glimpsed Otsego Lake in 1785. Otsego Lake is located north-northwest of Mount Vision.
