= Springfield, New York =

- Town
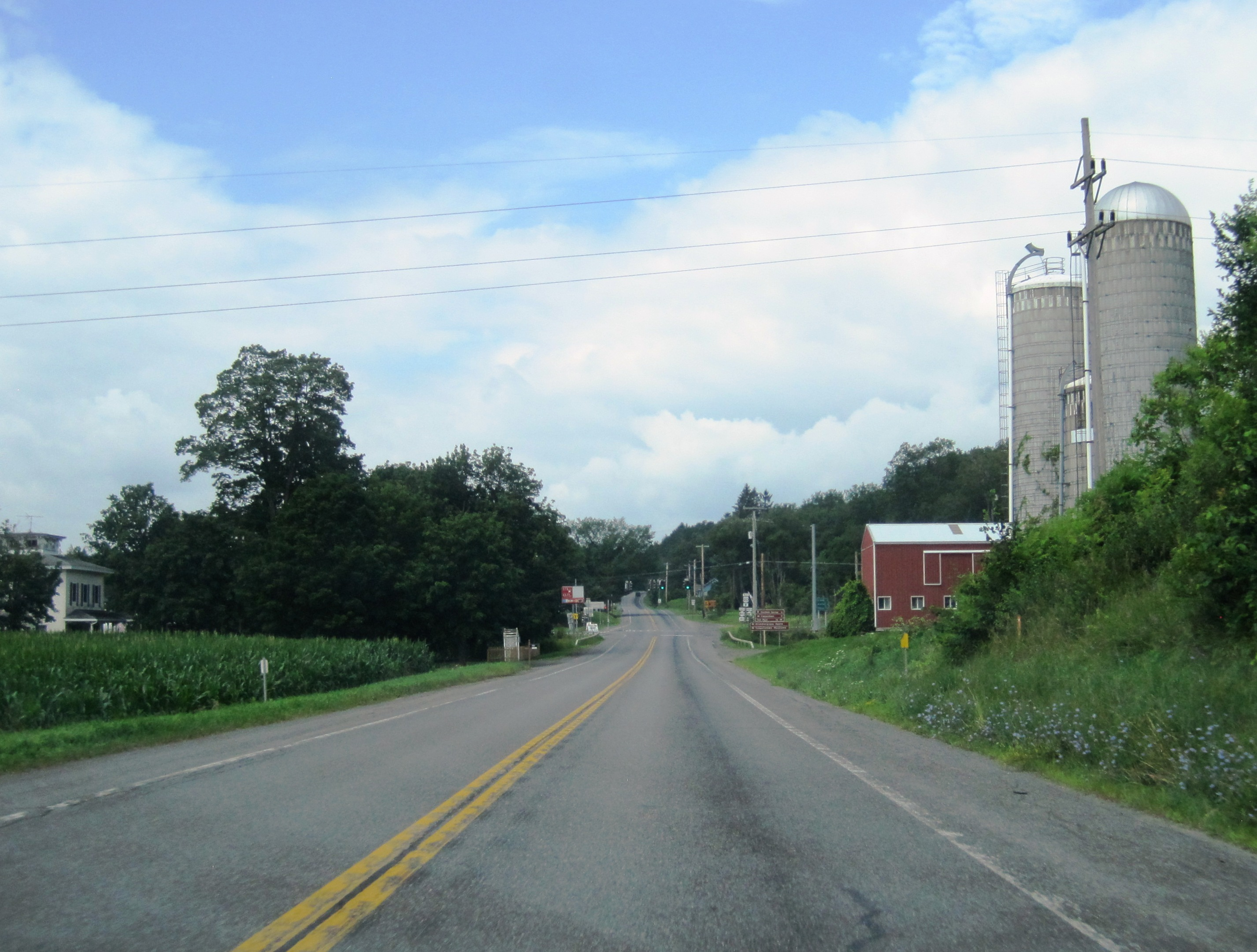
- US 20 westbound approaching NY 80 in the hamlet of Springfield Four Corners

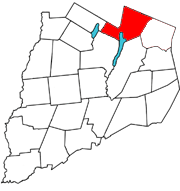
- Springfield, Otsego County, New York
- Coordinates: 42°50′10″N 74°51′13″W
- Country: United States
- State: New York
- County: Otsego
- Settled: 1762
- Established: 1797

Area
  - Total: 45.51 sq mi (117.86 km^{2})
  - Land: 42.89 sq mi (111.09 km^{2})
  - Water: 2.61 sq mi (6.77 km^{2}) 5.46%
- Elevation: 1,322 ft (403 m)

Population (2010)
  - Total: 1,358
  - Estimate (2016): 1,294
  - Density: 30.2/sq mi (11.65/km^{2})
- Time zone: UTC-5 (Eastern (EST))
  - Summer (DST): UTC-4 (EDT)
- ZIP code: 13468 13468
- Area code: 607
- FIPS code: 36-70310
- GNIS feature ID: 0979514
- Website: townspringfield.digitaltowpath.org:10427/content

Springfield is a town in Otsego County, New York, United States. The population was 1,358 at the 2010 census. It is located at the northern county line of Otsego County and is approximately 50 mi (80 km) west of Schenectady.

== History ==
Several families settled near Otsego Lake circa 1762, but little further development occurred until after the American Revolution.

Springfield was formed from part of the Town of Cherry Valley in 1797. Growing hops was a major agricultural pursuit.

=== Burning of Springfield (1778) ===
In 1778, Joseph Brant, native leader, led an expedition that burned the town and took captives. Lieutenant Colonel Jacob Ford wrote a letter to General Abraham Ten Broeck informing him of the destruction of Springfield.

== Geography ==
According to the United States Census Bureau, the town has a total area of 45.5 square miles (118 km^{2}), of which 43.0 square miles (111 km^{2}) is land and 2.5 square miles (6.5 km^{2}) (5.46%) is water.

The town encloses the northern end of Otsego Lake. Hayden Creek flows southward from Summit Lake into the northern end of the Otsego Lake. Because Summit Lake is located on a divide, part of its flow exits from the northern end of the lake through Cedar Swamp into Otsquago Creek. The "Chyle", is the name of a sinkhole located northwest of Summit Lake. Shadow Brook enters Otsego Lake at Hyde Bay.

New York State Route 80, a north–south highway, intersects US Route 20, an east–west highway, north of Springfield Center.

The northern town line is the county line of Herkimer County and a small section of Montgomery County.

== Demographics ==
Historical population
Census	Pop.	Note	%±
1820	2,065		—
1830	2,816		36.4%
1840	2,382		−15.4%
1850	2,322		−2.5%
1860	2,390		2.9%
1870	2,022		−15.4%
1880	2,616		29.4%
1890	1,726		−34.0%
1900	1,762		2.1%
1910	1,468		−16.7%
1920	1,287		−12.3%
1930	1,305		1.4%
1940	1,135		−13.0%
1950	1,184		4.3%
1960	1,121		−5.3%
1970	1,136		1.3%
1980	1,239		9.1%
1990	1,267		2.3%
2000	1,350		6.6%
2010	1,358		0.6%
2016 (est.)	1,294		−4.7%
U.S. Decennial Census

As of the census of 2000, there were 1,350 people, 521 households, and 375 families residing in the town. The population density was 31.4 inhabitants per square mile (12.1/km^{2}). There were 712 housing units at an average density of 16.6 per square mile (6.4/km^{2}). The racial makeup of the town was 98.59% White, 0.15% African American, 0.07% Native American, 0.22% Asian, 0.15% from other races, and 0.81% from two or more races. Hispanic or Latino of any race were 1.19% of the population.

There were 521 households, out of which 32.4% had children under the age of 18 living with them, 60.1% were married couples living together, 6.5% had a female householder with no husband present, and 28.0% were non-families. 22.6% of all households were made up of individuals, and 12.7% had someone living alone who was 65 years of age or older. The average household size was 2.59 and the average family size was 3.04.

In the town, the population was spread out, with 26.2% under the age of 18, 5.3% from 18 to 24, 25.3% from 25 to 44, 25.7% from 45 to 64, and 17.4% who were 65 years of age or older. The median age was 42 years. For every 100 females, there were 98.8 males. For every 100 females age 18 and over, there were 99.6 males.

The median income for a household in the town was $33,854, and the median income for a family was $38,490. Males had a median income of $25,625 versus $23,611 for females. The per capita income for the town was $16,513. About 5.6% of families and 8.5% of the population were below the poverty line, including 10.8% of those under age 18 and 5.4% of those age 65 or over.

== Communities and locations in Springfield ==
- Allen Lake – A small lake near the western town line.
- Briar Hill – An elevation near the eastern town line, south of East Springfield.
- Clarke Point – A headland of Otsego Lake, north of Hyde Bay.
- Clarke Pond – A pond located southwest of Springfield Center.
- East Springfield – A hamlet east of Middle Village on US-20 at the junction of County Route 31. The East Springfield Union School and Hyde Hall Covered Bridge are listed on the National Register of Historic Places.
- Glimmerglass State Park – A state park partly in the town at the eastern shore of Otsego Lake.
- Hyde Bay – A bay of Otsego Lake, partly in the town.
- King Hill – An elevation in the far western part of the town. Partly in the Towns of Richfield and Otsego.
- Middle Village – A hamlet east of Springfield village on US-20.

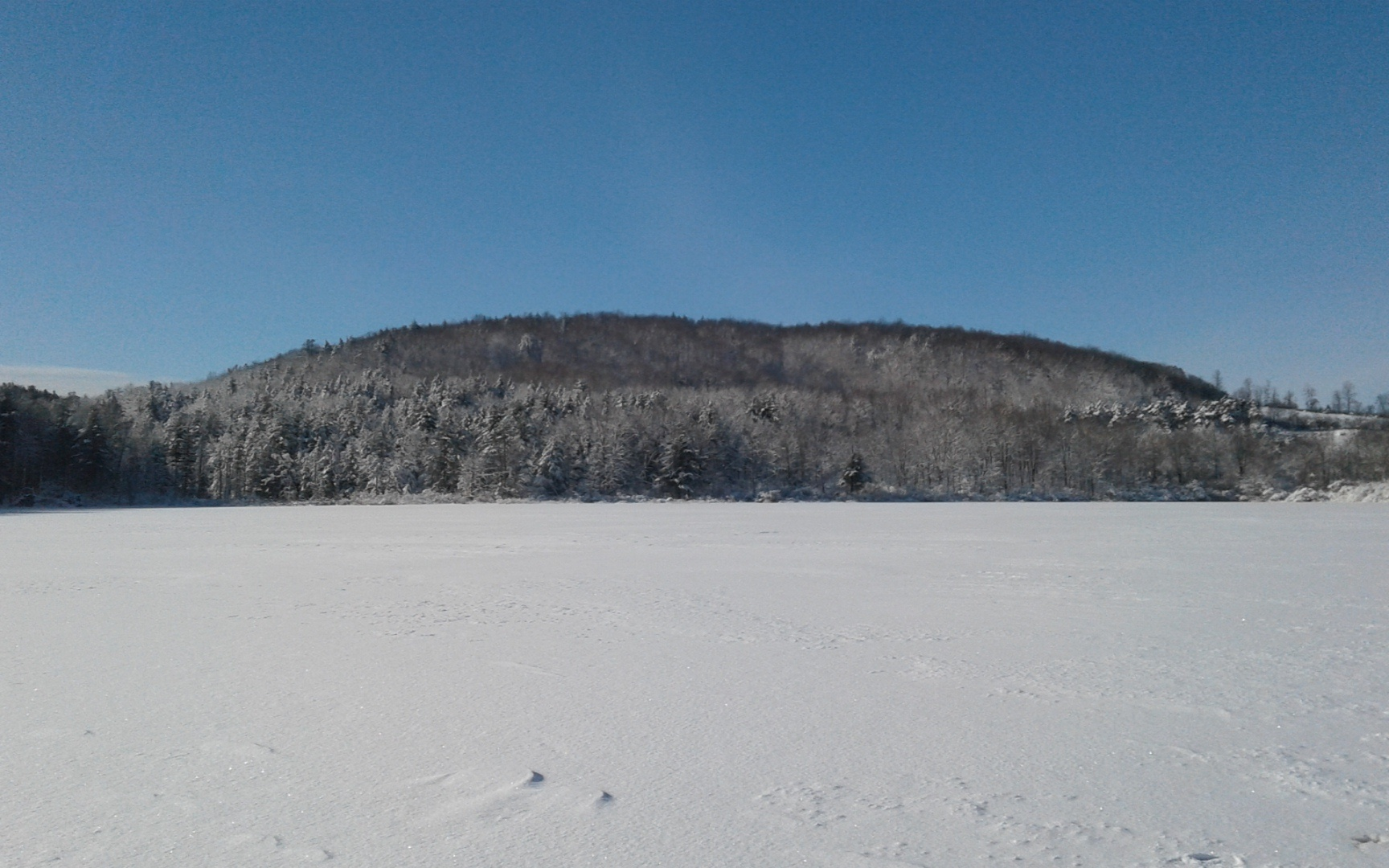
Mohegan Hill from Allen Lake in January 2019.

- Mohegan Hill – An elevation located west of Allen Lake.
- Mount Tom – An elevation north of Springfield Four Corners.
- Mount Wellington – A notable hill north of Otsego Lake.
- Otsego Lake – A lake partly in the Town.
- Pine Cobble – An elevation south of Middle Village.
- Rum Hill – An elevation south of Allen Lake, on the town of Otsego border.
- Shipman Pond – A pond north of Springfield Center.
- Springfield – The hamlet of Springfield is located on US Route 20.
- Springfield Center – A hamlet on NY-80, at County Route 29A, north of Otsego Lake.
- Springfield Four Corners – A location northwest of Springfield village, located on NY-80.
- Summit Lake – A small lake north of Otsego Lake.
- Waiontha Mountain – An elevation north of Allen Lake.

== Notable people ==
- Walt Brown, racing driver
- Elisha Hall, inventor of a type of threshing machine.
- George Hyde Clarke, grandson to the Acting Governor of New York from 1736 to 1743 (under British rule)
- Arthur L. Ryerson, steel industrialist who died on the Titanic, maintained a summer home for his family in Springfield Center known as Ringwood
- Henry Lansing Wardwell, New York City financier, maintained a summer estate and farm in Springfield Center known as Pinehurst. Still owned by descendants today.
