= Mount Wellington (New York) =

Mountain located in New York State

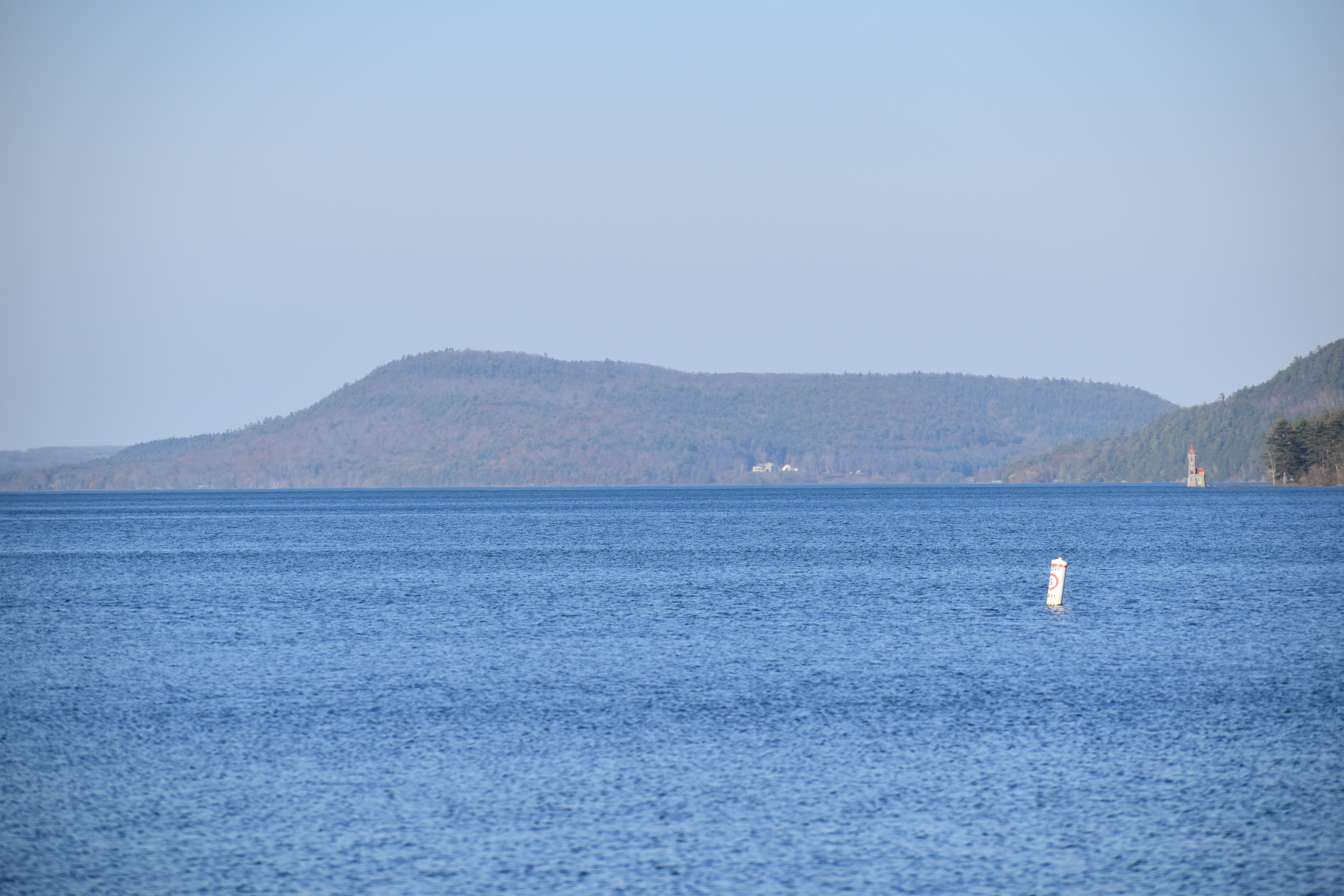
- Mount Wellington from Cooperstown boat launch

Highest point
- Elevation: 1,827 feet (557 m)
- Coordinates: 42°48′19″N 74°52′24″W

Geography
- Location within New York Location within the United States
- Location: Springfield Center, New York, U.S.
- Topo map: USGS East Springfield

Mount Wellington is a mountain located in the Central New York Region of New York. It is located south of the Hamlet of Springfield Center at the northern end of Otsego Lake. Mount Wellington rises 600 feet (180 m) above lake level. The extreme southern point of the mountain is called Clarke Point and also referred to as the Shad Cam. It is known as "The Sleeping Lion", as it looks similar to a lion laying down, viewed from Cooperstown, New York. It was originally named Mount Millington, but was renamed by George Hyde Clarke in honor of Field Marshal The 1st Duke of Wellington, the victor of Waterloo, who had been Clarke's schoolmate at Eton College in England.
