= Hyde Hall =

Historic house in New York, United States

- U.S. National Register of Historic Places
- U.S. National Historic Landmark
- New York State Register of Historic Places
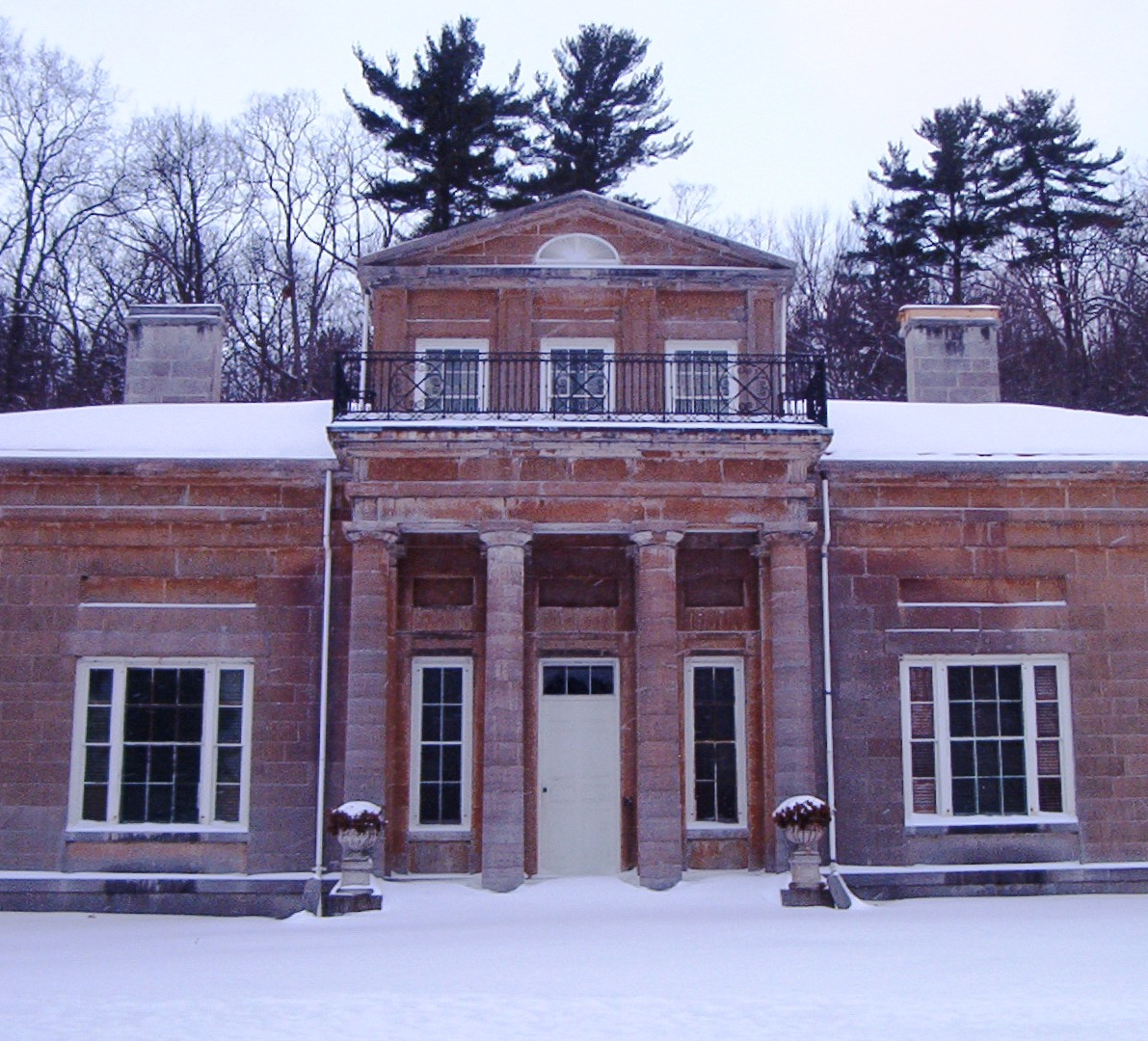

- Location within New York Location within the United States
- Location: Springfield Center, New York
- Coordinates: 42.792314°N 74.868908°W
- Built: 1817-1834
- Architect: Philip Hooker
- Architectural style: Country Mansion
- NRHP reference No.: 71000555
- NYSRHP No.: 07721.000001

Significant dates
- Added to NRHP: October 7, 1971
- Designated NHL: June 24, 1986
- Designated NYSRHP: June 23, 1980

Hyde Hall is a neoclassical country mansion in Springfield Center, New York, designed by architect Philip Hooker for George Clarke (1768–1835), a wealthy landowner. The house was constructed between 1817 and 1834, and designed with English and American architectural features. It was designated a National Historic Landmark in 1986 for its architecture, and the completeness of its architectural documentary record. It is one of the few surviving works of Philip Hooker, a leading 19th-century American architect.

== History ==
The George Clarke who commissioned the building was the great grandson of another George Clarke (1676-1760), who held several posts in the government of the colony of New York in the first half of the 18th century, including acting governor from 1736 to 1743. The ancestral home of the Clarke family was at Hyde in Cheshire in northwest England, now part of Manchester.

The younger George Clarke, having inherited his great grandfather's extensive fortune and lands in New York, settled in Albany in 1806. His ownership of much of the land he inherited was long disputed, though he won in the lower courts in December 1815 and his title was vindicated by the U.S. Supreme Court in 1818.

In 1813, Clarke married Ann Low Cary Cooper, a member of one of New York's most prominent families and the widow of James Fenimore Cooper's elder brother. In 1817 he purchased lands on Lake Otsego adjacent to his wife's estate and contracted with Hooker for a country villa. The construction project expanded over time, aided in part by Clarke's further inheritance from his father in 1824.

=== Architecture ===
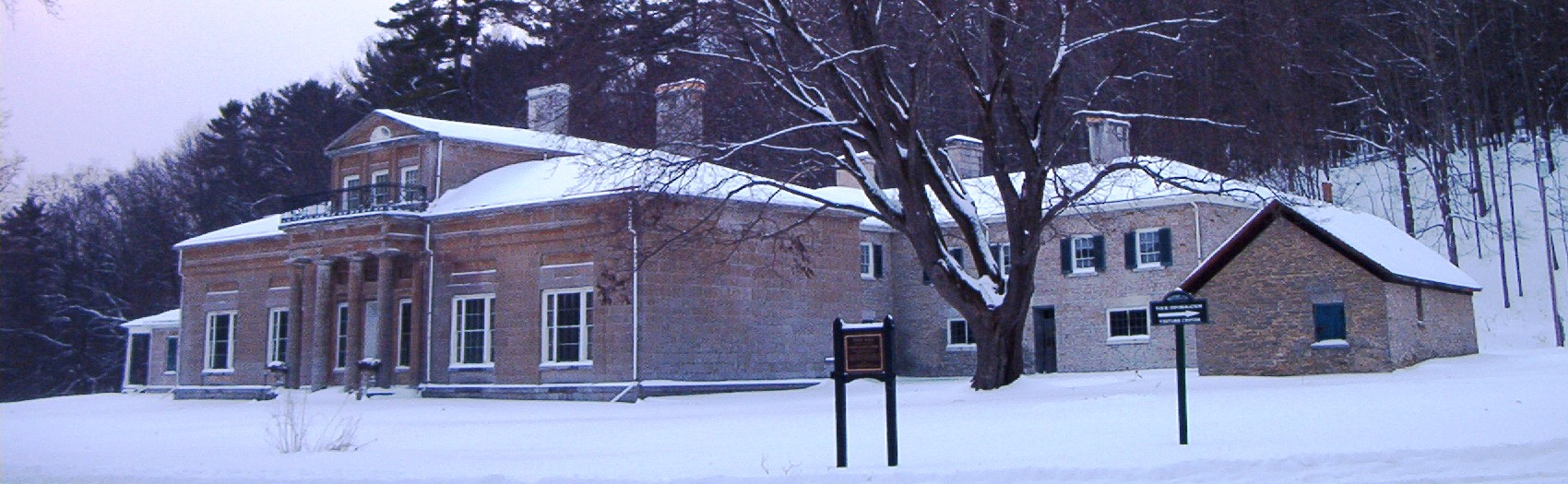
Oblique view showing mass of building to rear

The architecture reflects the building's evolution during the 14 years of its construction, with a series of wings facing a central courtyard. The first phase, the family rooms called the Stone House, is "Palladian in form with a central two story, hip roofed core flanked by one story wings and fronted by a porch". Among its details are "Tuscan piers on the porch, a Palladian window surmounted by an oval arch, five oval windows and simple moldings in a restrained Federal style. The walls are smooth ashlar limestone with a narrow intervening band for every third course. The interior rooms are intimate, focused around a pair of library-living rooms."

The second phase, larger than Stone House, contained quarters for servants and services, as well as second-floor bedrooms. Its details are plain in comparison with Stone House and the exterior in fieldstone. The third construction project, the Great House, adopted a neo-Classical style unlike the Palladian. It emphasizes right angles and avoids curved forms for doorways, windows, and moldings. It represents one of the earliest uses of Doric columns found in New York, using a form more slender than their ancient models. As in the second phase of construction, large undecorated ashlar blocks form the walls. The Great House contains two entertaining rooms, a drawing room and a dining room. They are grandly proportioned, each 34 by 26 feet and 19 feet high. The ceilings are elaborately decorated. A smaller pavilion upstairs, reached by a semi-circular staircase, serves as billiard room.

== Present day ==
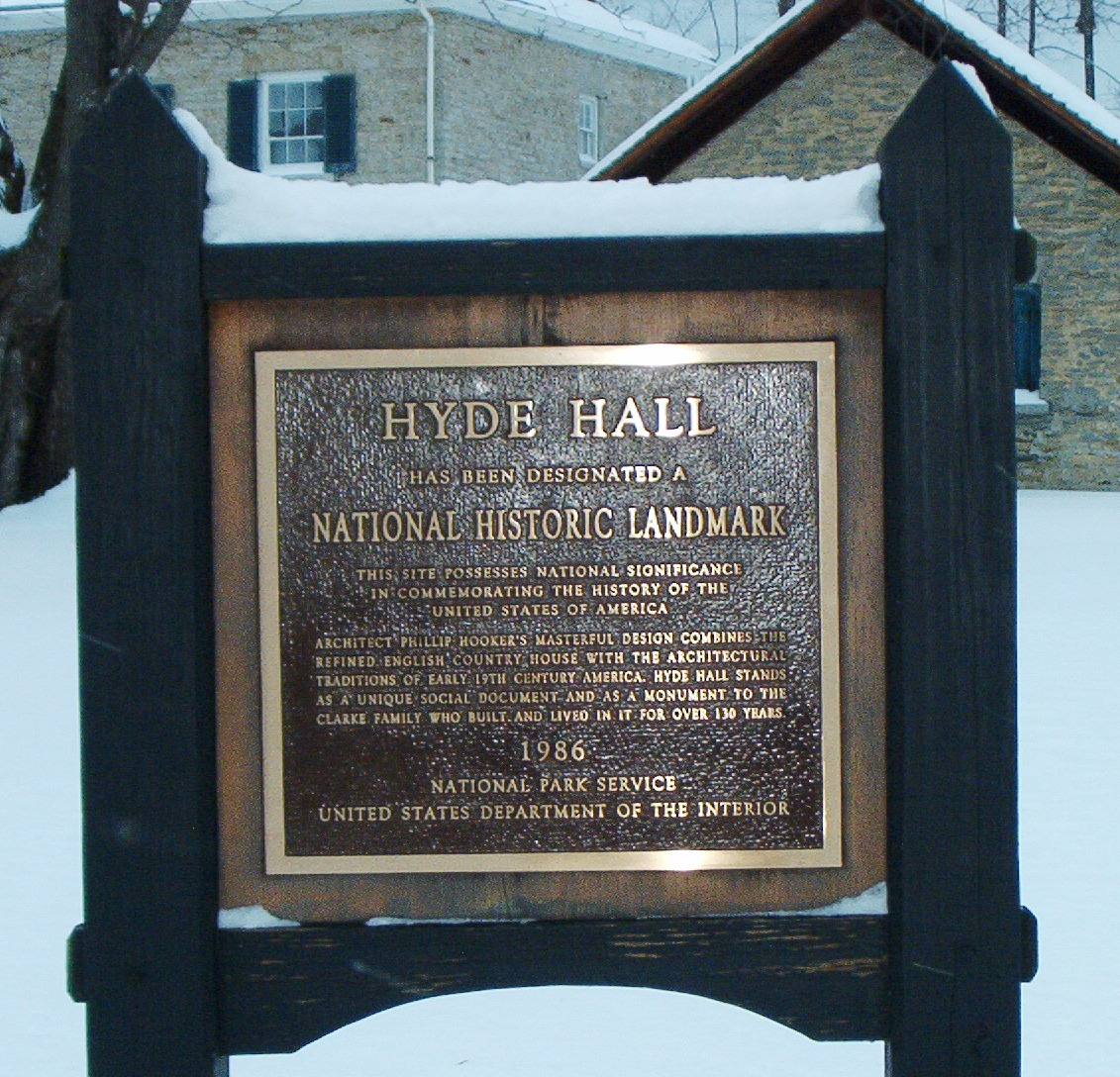
National Historic Landmark plaque

It is located in New York within Glimmerglass State Park on Otsego Lake at the base of Mount Wellington. Also on the grounds, constructed at the same time as the mansion, is Hyde Hall Bridge, a covered bridge.

The building is a New York State Historic Site known as Hyde Hall State Historic Site. It was declared a National Historic Landmark in 1986. Members of the public may reserve a tour of the mansion by calling (607) 547-5098.

== See also ==
- List of National Historic Landmarks in New York
- List of New York State Historic Sites
