= Hyde Bay =

- Location within New York Hyde Bay (the United States)
- Coordinates: 42°47′09″N 74°52′32″W
- Part of: Otsego Lake

Hyde Bay is a bay located on Otsego Lake. The historic Hyde Bay Camp was located on the shores of Hyde Bay. Hyde Bay is the location on the lake where General Clinton and his men landed on their way to Cooperstown.
