= Otsego Lake (New York) =

Lake in Otsego County, New York, USA

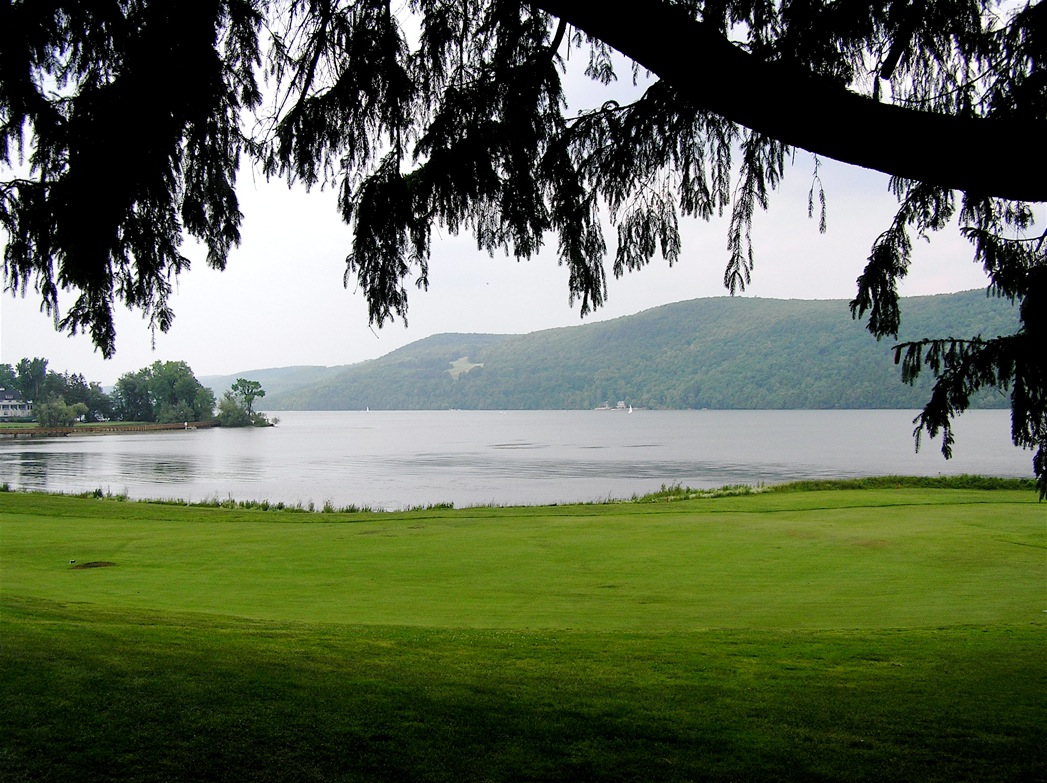
- Southwest end of Otsego Lake

- Location within New York Otsego Lake (the United States)
- Location: Otsego County, New York, United States
- Coordinates: 42°45′23″N 74°53′46″W
- Type: Lake
- Primary inflows: Hayden Creek, Shadow Brook, Trout Brook, Cripple Creek, Leatherstocking Creek, Willow Brook, Mohican Brook, Brookwood Creek, Glimmer Glen Creek
- Primary outflows: Susquehanna River
- Catchment area: 74 sq mi (190 km^{2})
- Basin countries: United States
- Max. length: 7.8 mi (12.6 km)
- Surface area: 4,046 acres (16.37 km^{2})
- Average depth: 82 ft (25 m)
- Max. depth: 167 ft (51 m)
- Water volume: 117,000,000,000 US gal (440,000,000 m^{3})
- Residence time: 3 years
- Shore length^{1}: 20.3 mi (32.7 km)
- Surface elevation: 1,194 feet (364 m)
- Islands: Sunken Island (sunken), Eel Island (sunken)
- Settlements: Cooperstown
- ^{1} Shore length is not a well-defined measure.

Otsego Lake is a 4,046-acre (16.37 km^{2}) lake located in Otsego County in the U.S. state of New York. It is the source of the Susquehanna River and largest lake in Otsego County. The Village of Cooperstown is located at the lake's southern end. Glimmerglass State Park is located on the lake's northeastern shore, and includes Hyde Hall, a large mansion constructed in 1817, that overlooks the lake. The Glimmerglass Opera, opened in June 1987, is located on the western shore.

Between 10,000 and 12,000 years ago, glaciers of the Wisconsin glaciation filled the valley. Otsego Lake was formed when an ice tongue from a glacier carved out the Susquehanna River Valley. As the glaciers melted slowly, they filled in the valley they carved out. The lake takes its name from the Haudenosaunee, who inhabited the area around the lake in and before the 17th century. The name Otsego is from a Mohawk or Oneida word meaning "place of the rock", referring to the large boulder near the lake's outlet, today known as Council Rock.

The lake's role in the state and local economy has led to a concentrated effort to protect and manage it. In 1935, the New York State Conservation Department performed the first biological survey of Otsego Lake. In 1968, the State University of New York at Oneonta (SUNY Oneonta) gained access to the lake, a location to build a field station and a biological research facility. At this time, the Otsego County Conservation Association (OCCA) was formed by a group of local landowners and sportsmen concerned about the water quality. SUNY Oneonta and OCCA collaborate on water quality improvement projects. The Otsego Lake Association, a not for profit group, makes sure that the Otsego Lake Watershed Management Plan is enforced. Today the lake is used recreationally and for sporting activities such as fishing.

== Geography ==
Otsego Lake is 7.8 miles (12.6 km) long with a surface area of 4,046 acres (16.37 km^{2}). Its average depth is 82 feet (25 m), with a maximum depth of 167 feet (51 m). The northern roughly two miles (3.2 km) of the lake is in the town of Springfield and the southern part in the town of Otsego, and bordered by the town of Middlefield on the eastern shore. The lake is the source of the Susquehanna River, which flows south through New York, Pennsylvania and Maryland before emptying into the Chesapeake Bay. The lake level is controlled by a dam that was built in 1905.

=== Sunken islands ===
Sunken Island is a submerged sandy plot located near the western shore of Otsego Lake, approximately six miles (9.7 km) north from Cooperstown. It is the supposed remains of an island described in the writings of James Fenimore Cooper upon which a structure once stood. Today Sunken Island is several feet below the surface of the lake and is marked with four buoys to prevent boats from running aground. Another sunken island, Eel Island, is located approximately seven miles (11 km) north of Cooperstown. It is much deeper than the other sunken island.

=== Bays and points ===
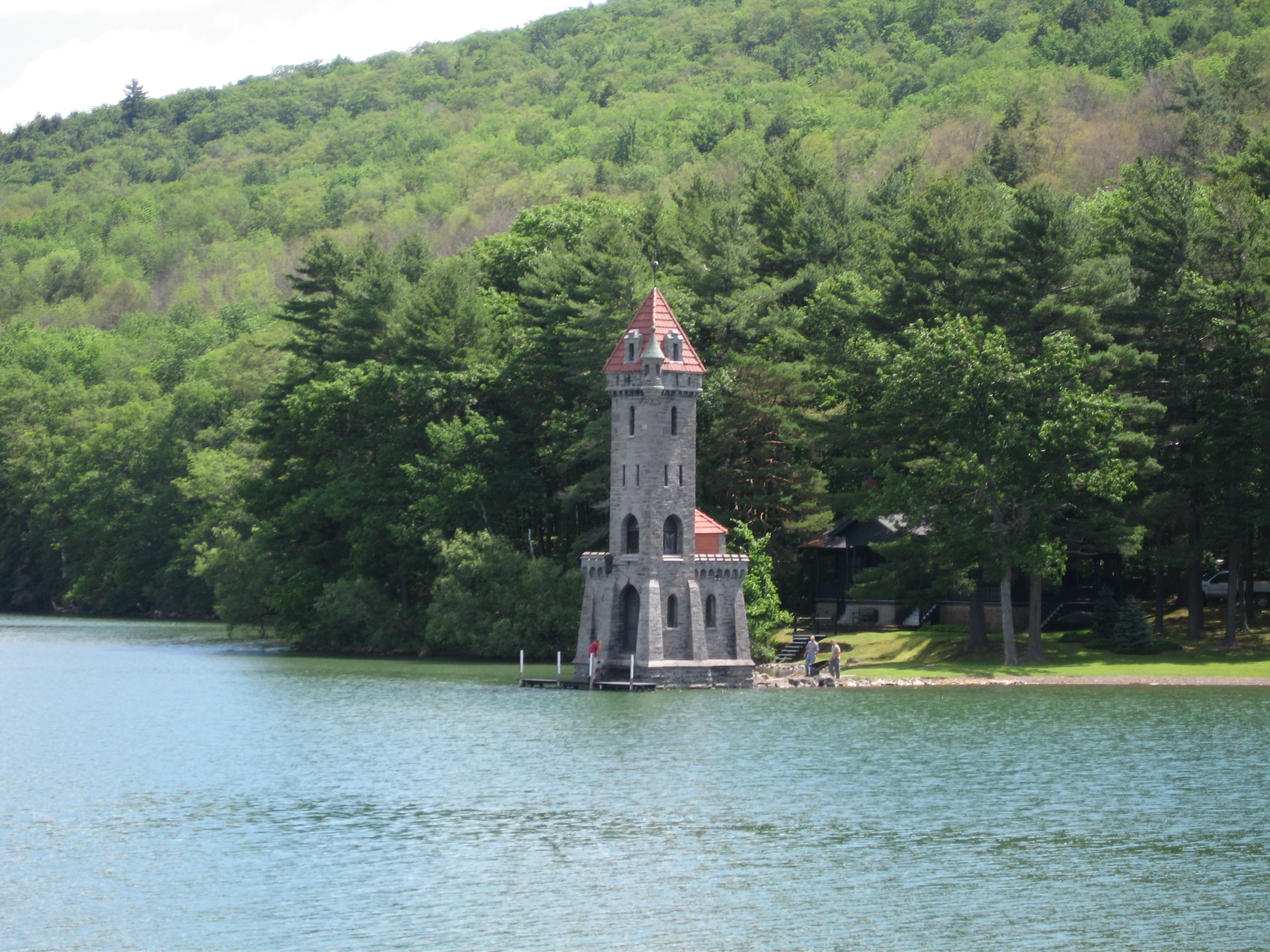
Point Judith and Kingfisher Tower in 2006

There are many bays on Otsego Lake and four of them are named. One is Blackbird Bay, which located on the southwest end of the lake in the Village of Cooperstown. The next bay north of Blackbird Bay is Muskrat Cove, also known as Rat Cove. Waterlily Bay is a bay located on the west side of the lake about 2.5 miles (4.0 km) from the foot of the lake. Then on the northern end of the lake is Hyde Bay. Glimmerglass State Park is located in this bay. Hyde Bay is named after the Hyde family.

There are many points on Otsego Lake and many of them are named. On the southwest part of the lake is Brookwood Point. About one mile (1.6 km) further north is Three Mile Point. About two miles (3.2 km) farther north is Five Mile Point. Mohican Brook enters the lake at Five Mile Point. Just north from Five Mile is Six Mile Point. Continuing further north about one mile (1.6 km) is Hutter Point.

On the east side of the lake just north of the outlet is Point Judith, is a projection into the east side of the lake. Point Judith is the location of the historic Kingfisher Tower. It was originally called Two Mile Point, but is now named after Judith Hutter from The Deerslayer. About one mile (1.6 km) further north is Point Florence. Roughly one mile (1.6 km) further north is Cherry Tree Point. About one mile (1.6 km) further north is Gravelly Point. Just north of Gravelly is Peggs Point. On the north end of the lake, west of Hyde Bay, is Clarke Point.

=== Adjacent mountains ===
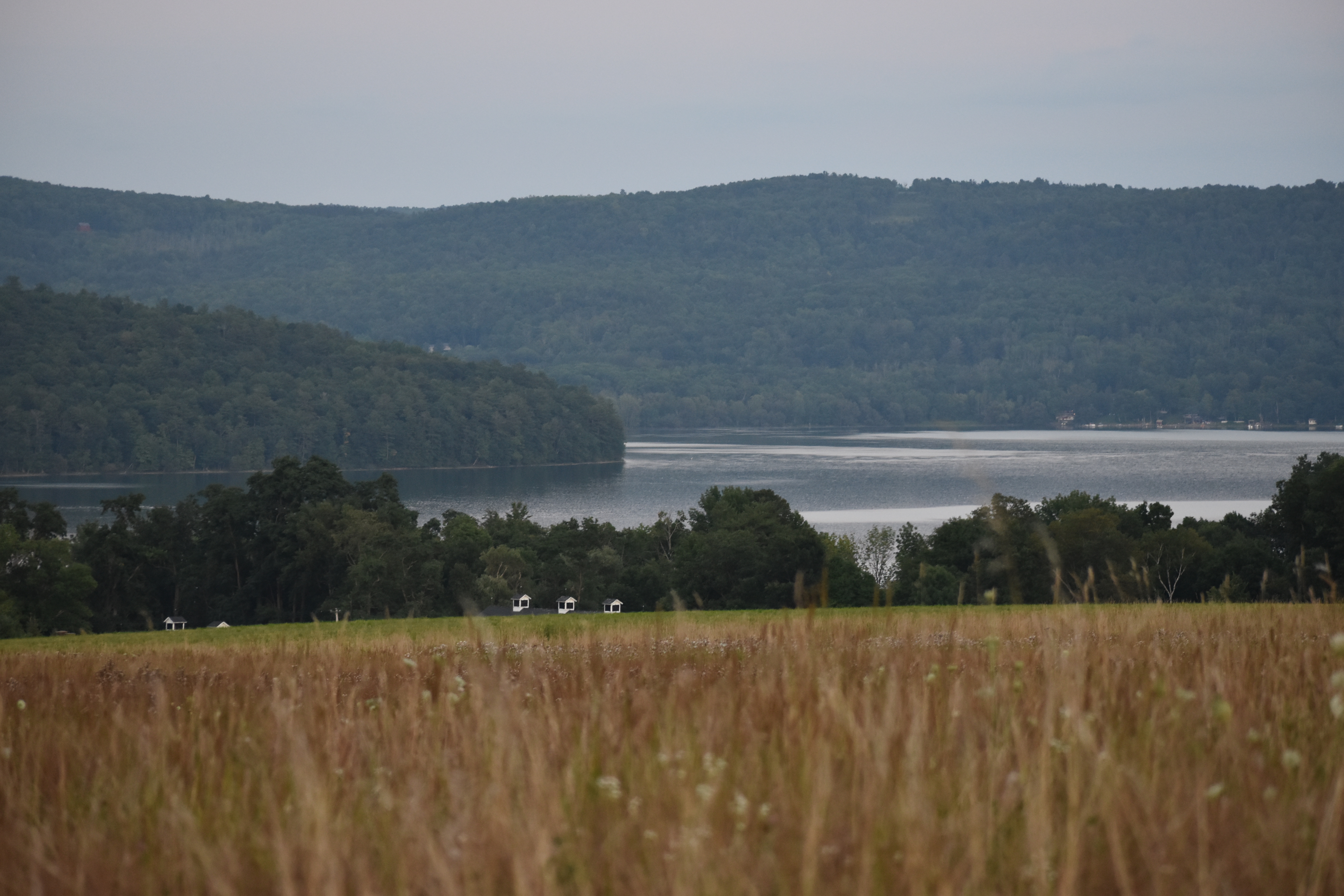
View of Clarke Point from Thurston Hill Road

One mountain near the lake is Mount Wellington, which is located on the north end of the lake, east of Hyde Bay. It is known as "The Sleeping Lion", as it looks similar to a lion lying down, viewed from Cooperstown, New York. It was named by George Hyde Clarke in honor of Field Marshal Arthur Wellesley, 1st Duke of Wellington, who went to Eton College in England with Clarke. Red House Hill is located on the west side of the lake, west of Six Mile Point. Mount Ovis is located on the west side of the lake behind the Farmer's Museum. It was named around 1813, by James Fenimore Cooper's grandfather, who kept on it some of the first imported Merino sheep (Ovis aries). Mount Vision is located on the east side of the lake by the south end. Mount Vision was named by Judge Cooper, and is the location where his father first saw the lake.

== History ==
=== Natural history ===
About 10,000 and 12,000 years ago, during the Wisconsin glaciation, a glacier slowly moved through and carved out a valley that Otsego Lake now sits in. As the glacier slowly melted, it filled in the valley that was carved out. The glacier exposed limestone in the lake's watershed, which now flows into the lake through the various tributaries. The limestone protects the lake from the damaging effects of acid rain.

There are various features surrounding the lake that are evidence of the glacier. These include moraines, drumlins, hanging deltas, clays and sands. There is also evidence that shows a previously higher lake level had existed, known as "Lake Cooperstown". The Cassville-Cooperstown moraine follows the Oaks Creek valley, crosses the Susquehanna roughly two miles (3.2 km) south of the lake's outlet and appears again in Cherry Valley, which is the next valley to the east. Near where this moraine crosses the Susquehanna, it rises to an elevation of 1,250 feet (380 m), except for a sharp cut that the Susquehanna River now flows through. The cut is the location of the "dam" that held Lake Cooperstown at an elevation of around 1,250 feet (380 m). Large terrace remnants are present around this location.

=== Human history ===
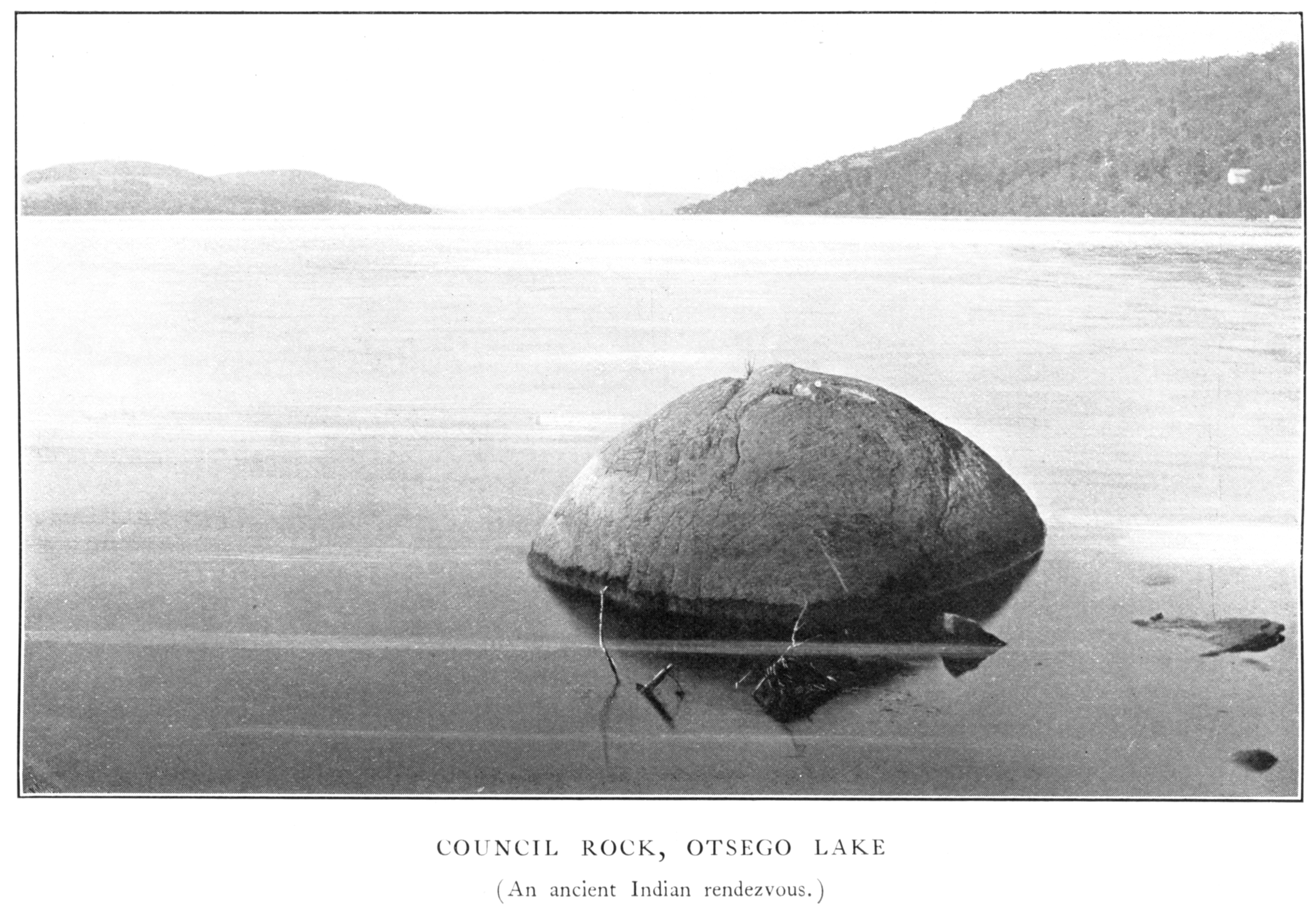
Council Rock, believed to have been a meeting place for Native Americans prior to the American Revolutionary War

Before European colonization, the Haudenosaunee inhabited the area around the lake. The name Otsego is from a Mohawk or Oneida word meaning "place of the rock", referring to the large boulder near the lake's outlet, today known as "Council Rock". It is a large boulder whose top is above the water's surface and can be seen from shore. At low water, the oval rock rises approximately 4.5 feet (1.4 m) above the water, and is about nine feet (2.7 m) long by six feet (1.8 m) wide. It is believed to have been a meeting place for Native Americans prior to the American Revolutionary War. A small parcel of land near Council Rock was presented to the Village of Cooperstown in 1957, on the condition that it remain open to the public as a park. The park, today known as Council Rock Park, also includes a set of concrete steps leading to a lake-level terrace that were built in 1937.

Pieter Quackenboss, Jr (1710–1774), an early settler of the Mohawk Valley, dealt extensively with the natives and became known as "The Old Indian Trader." The following incident in his life is recorded in the 1848 book Women of the American Revolution:

Pieter Quackenboss was among the early settlers of the [Montgomery] County, and did not escape the difficulties. He was a trader with the Indians, who placed great confidence in him, frequently consulting him. They were disposed to bestow on him some particular mark of regard, and after meeting for consultation, they decided on giving him the name " Otsego" and christening the lake for him. The ceremony of naming both him and the lake was performed by pouring liquor upon his head as he knelt on the ground, a portion being afterwards poured into the water. It is probable that few are acquainted with this origin of the name of Otsego Lake; but that family tradition has been confirmed by the recollection of some who witnessed the occurrence.

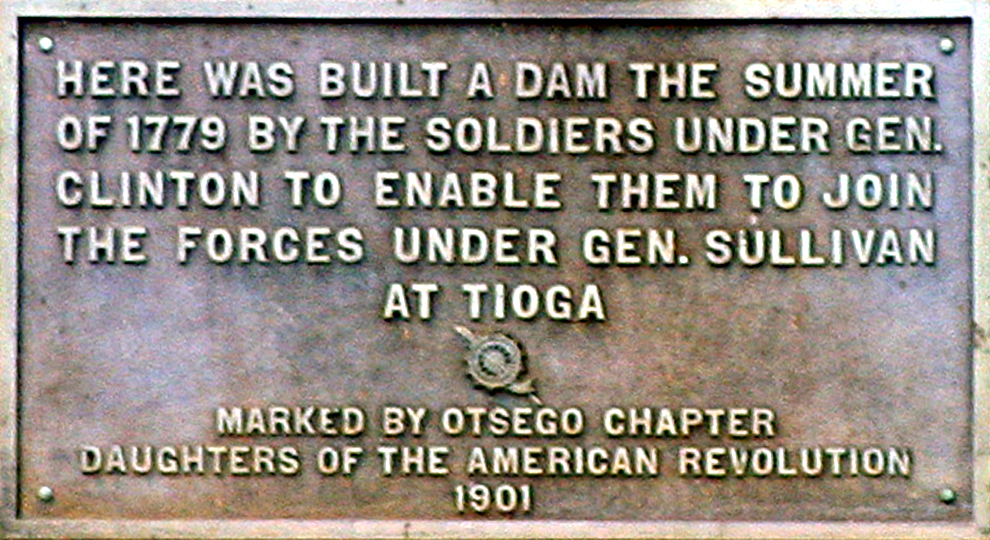
Plaque on the Monument at the site of General Clinton's dam

Early in 1779, General James Clinton and his soldiers began to haul 208 boats and all their supplies from the present day Villages of Fort Plain and Canajoharie, along the Mohawk River, towards Otsego Lake. By the end of June, they had made it to the lake and began to build a temporary dam at the outlet to raise the water level. The purpose of this was to break the dam and ride the flood water down the river to meet General John Sullivan at Tioga. This event is described by James Fenimore Cooper in the introduction to his popular novel The Pioneers, and commemorated by a Memorial Day canoe race.

In 1785, William Cooper settled at the south end of the lake and founded the settlement that is now known as Cooperstown. A few years after settling, there was a food shortage. Cooper stated:

A singular event deemed sent by a good Providence to our relief; it was reported to me that unusual shoals of fish were seen moving in the clear waters of the Susquehanna. l went, and was surprised to find that they were herrings (probably American shad, Alosa sapidissima). We made something like a small net, by the interweaving of twigs, and by this rude and simple contrivance we were able to take them in thousands. In less than two days each family had an ample supply.

Between 1817 and 1834, Hyde Hall was constructed at the north end of the lake. It is located within Glimmerglass State Park at the base of Mount Wellington. The building is a New York State Historic Site known as Hyde Hall State Historic Site. It was declared a National Historic Landmark in 1986. In 1825, Hyde Hall Bridge, a historic wooden covered bridge, was built on what was then Hyde Hall property. The bridge crosses the Shadow Brook tributary of the lake.

In 1858, the first commercial steamboat was put into operation on the lake, and by 1894, the number was up to ten. Two of them, the Natty Bumppo and the Cyclone, could hold more than 300 passengers per boat. At this time, commercial transportation on the lake was developed to fill in the gap between rail traffic entering from the Catskills into Cooperstown, to Richfield Springs where it accessed a railway that linked to a railway between Albany and Buffalo, and the Erie Canal. The last commercial steamboat went out of business in 1933.

In 1870, Elihu Phinney built a fish hatchery at Three Mile Point on the west side of the lake. Over the next few years thousands of fish were raised and released into the lake. In 1935, the New York State Conservation Department performed the first biological survey of the lake. In 1968, access to the lake and a location to build a field station and biological research facility were acquired by State University of New York at Oneonta (SUNY Oneonta). Also at this time, the Otsego County Conservation Association (OCCA) was formed by a group of local landowners and sportsmen concerned about the water quality. SUNY Oneonta and OCCA work closely together to plan and discuss water quality improvement projects. Glimmerglass State Park opened in the late 1960s.

In 1999, the 15,000-acre (61 km^{2}) Glimmerglass Historic District was formed, which includes the entire lake. The district covers parts of three towns, Otsego, Springfield, and Middlefield and also the village of Cooperstown. It includes 1,475 contributing features, including Hyde Hall in Glimmerglass State Park.

== Geology ==
It is geologically related to the Finger Lakes, as they were both carved by glaciers, but is not counted among them. One difference is that Otsego Lake is situated at a higher elevation (1,194 feet [364 m]) than the Finger Lakes (approximately 400 feet [122 m]). Another difference is the Finger Lakes are part of the Lake Ontario watershed, and Otsego is part of the Susquehanna River watershed. The lake is known for its deepness as well as the shallow littoral zone present around the majority of the lake. The shallow areas correlate to sediments deposited from tributaries that enter the lake. This is best shown at the north end of the lake where Trout Brook, Cripple Creek, and Hayden Creek enter the lake. It is also present in Hyde Bay where Shadow Brook enters, and at the south end of the lake between where Willow Brook enters the lake and Brookwood Point.

The water residence time for the lake is roughly 3 years. The majority of the water drains into the Susquehanna River, however evapotranspiration and loss to groundwater occurs but has not been measured as of 2017. Most substances that dissolve in the lake eventually leave the lake with the flow, with some serving as nutrients for organisms living in the lake. Due to water velocity slowing as the tributaries reach the lake, soil particles such as clay, silt, and sand, will usually remain within the lake longer than the water residence time. This over long periods of time can fill the lake basin in, which increases water levels. Short term problems occur as well, as lake trout were studied and found that they were not using their normal spawning beds, due to being buried in silt.

Otsego Lake is chemically eutrophic, which means that it is rich in nutrients and supports a dense plant population, the decomposition of which kills some animal life by depriving it of oxygen. It is also morphometrically oligotrophic, which means that its large size causes it to appear and function as a nutrient-poor lake although it receives a fair amount of nutrients. Many other lakes in this climate/area, such as Canadarago Lake just to the west, are smaller and shallower. In shallow lakes, algae that die fall to the bottom and decompose, which causes all of the oxygen at the lower levels to be used. This results in greater algae populations the next year and reduced sediments. However, with Otsego Lake being much deeper, the same amounts of nutrients entering are used by algae or lost into deep water. The algae still die and settle on the bottom, but due to higher oxygen levels, the oxygen isn't completely exhausted. Therefore the majority of Otsego Lake is oligotrophic, with some of the shallow bays showing eutrophic characteristics.

== Watershed ==
Otsego lake watershed

The Otsego Lake watershed covers approximately 75 square miles (190 km^{2}) and includes parts of the towns of Otsego, Springfield, Middlefield, Warren and Richfield in the counties of Herkimer and Otsego in the State of New York. The watershed is 44% agricultural land, 36% forested, and 14.5% brushland. It is the headwaters of the 27,510-square-mile (71,300 km^{2}) drainage basin of the Susquehanna River which runs from Otsego Lake in Cooperstown to Havre de Grace, Maryland, where it flows into the Chesapeake Bay of the Atlantic Ocean. The lake is the drinking water source for the Village of Cooperstown and residents who live along the lake shores.

SUNY Oneonta maintains a Biological Field Station (BFS) that regularly takes phosphorus samples around the lake. Tributaries to the lake are the major source of phosphorus, contributing 75-88 percent. Shadow Brook contributes the highest, with Hayden Brook being the next highest. Rain and snow contribute 8-15 percent and on-site septic systems contribute 4-10 percent. There is also evidence of some internal recycling of phosphorus from the lake's bottom.

== Conservation and management ==
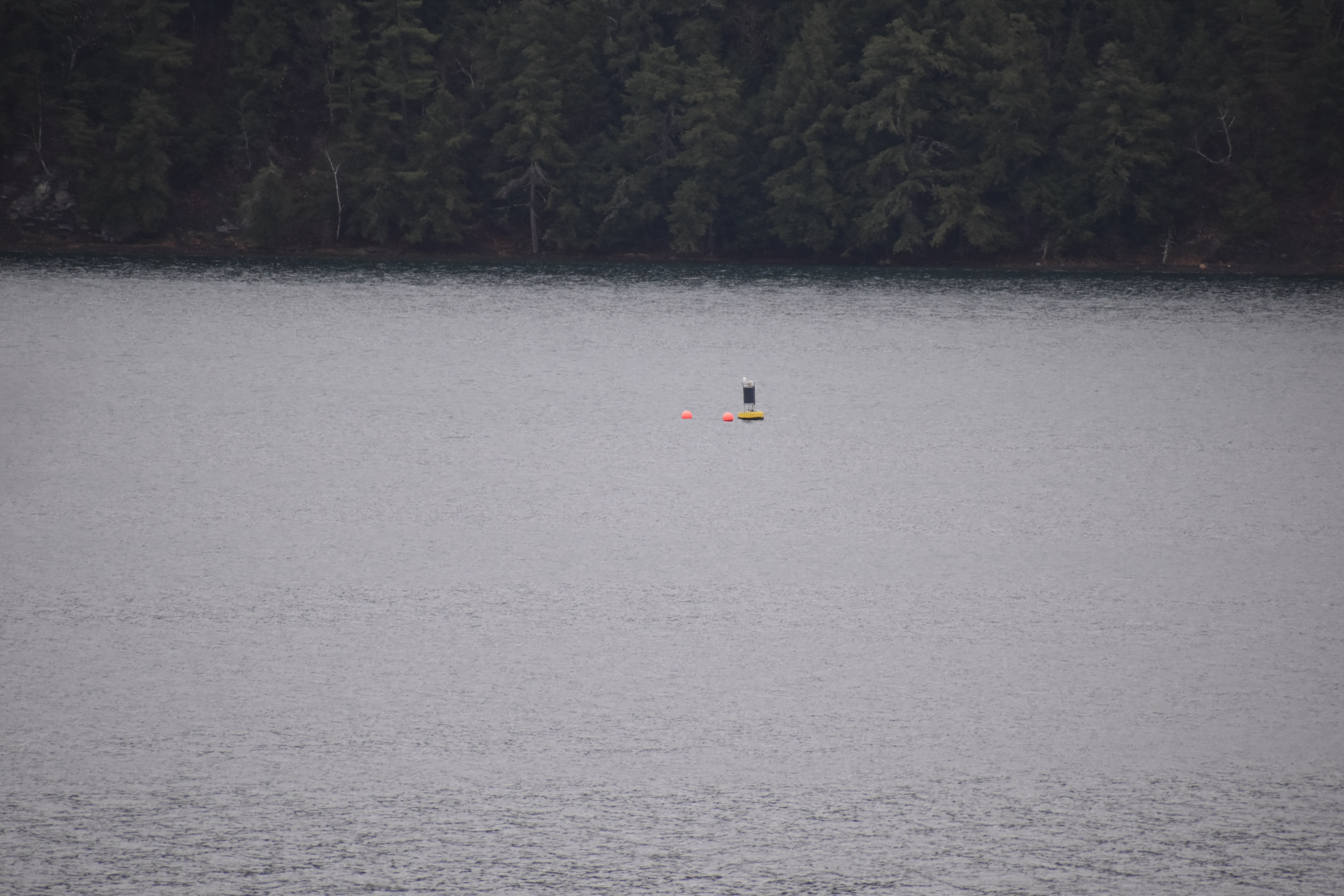
Biological Field Station research buoy by Five Mile Point

In 1870, a fish hatchery was built on the west shore of the lake. Over the years that it was in operation, over one million fish were stocked, including whitefish, landlocked salmon, black bass, California mountain trout, salmon trout and smelt. In 1935, as part of a wider survey of the Delaware and Susquehanna watersheds, the New York State Conservation Department studied the plankton, fish, plants, and physical and chemical properties of Otsego Lake. In 1968, access to the lake and a location to build a field station and biological research facility were acquired by SUNY Oneonta. Also at this time, the OCCA was formed by a group of local landowners and sportsmen concerned about the water quality. SUNY and the OCCA work together on water quality improvement projects. The main laboratory is located on the west shore of the lake just north of Cooperstown. Further north on the lake is the Thayer Farm, where the boathouse is located, that houses their research boats. Also the Otsego Lake Association, a not for profit group, makes sure that the Otsego Lake Watershed Management Plan is enforced.

In 2001, approximately 2,000 cubic yards (1,500 m^{3}) of material was dredged from Clarke Pond on the northwest end of the lake. Also the aged leaking dam was repaired so it could continue to serve as a sediment detention basin. Funding was provided by a grant as well as from the Clark Foundation, property owners and the BFS. From 2002 to 2003, four wetlands in the watershed were restored under the oversight of Ducks Unlimited. Funding was provided by the United States Army Corps of Engineers (USACE). Monitoring was conducted by BFS of the sites to determine the influence of the projects on water quality, as well as floral and fauna. In 1999, the village of Cooperstown received a $5,600 grant from the NYSDEC, to purchase lighted buoys to mark a no-wake zone, that extends 200 feet (61 m) from shore. Since then, additional buoys have been purchased. A team of BFS divers install and remove the buoys each year. Signage regarding the no-wake zone is posted at access sites to the lake.

=== Invasive species ===
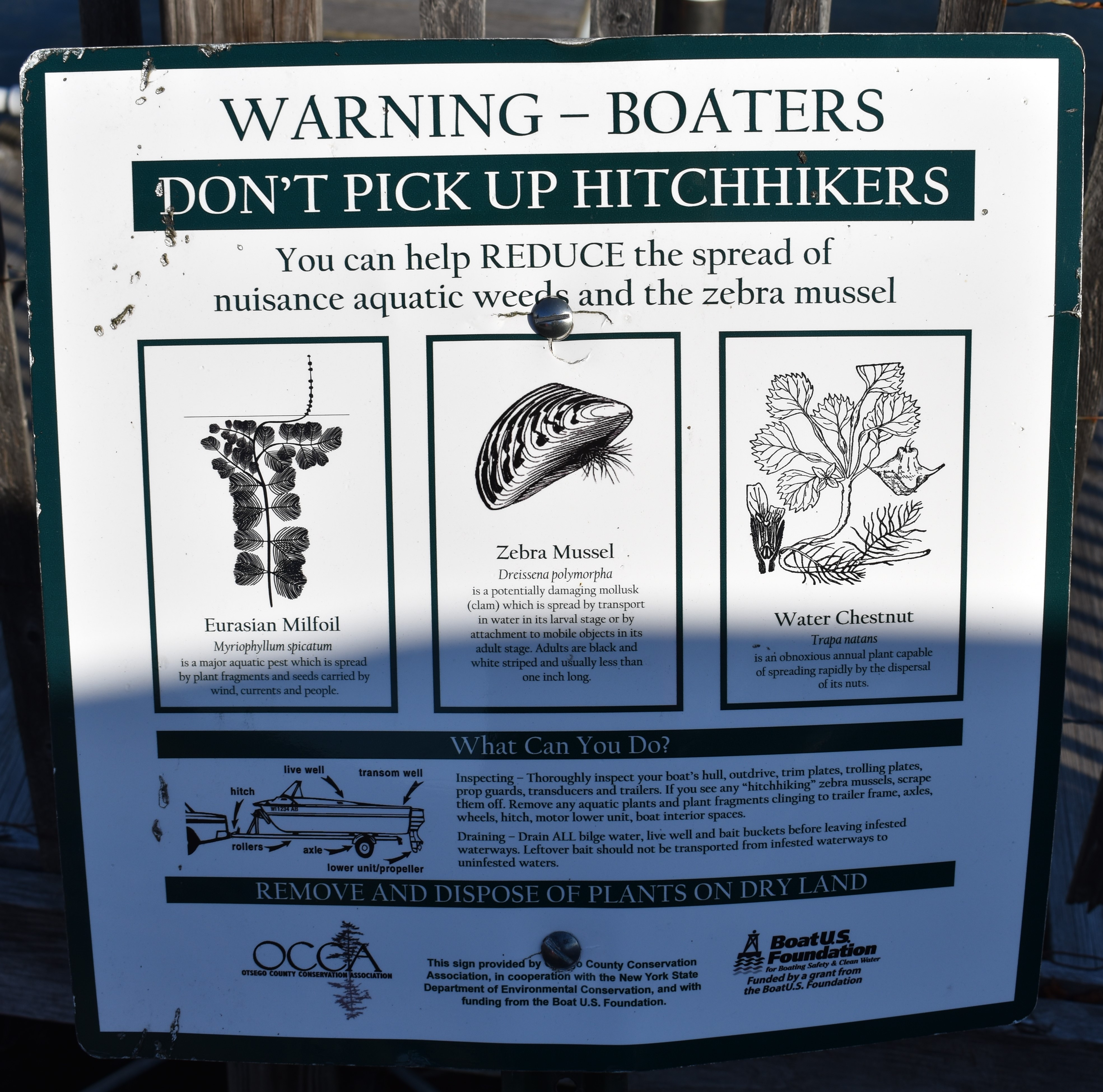
Invasive species sign at Cooperstown boat launch

Zebra mussels were first introduced into the Great Lakes in the mid- to late-1980s from ballast discharged from freighters originating in the Black and Caspian Sea region of eastern Europe and western Asia. They first became established in Otsego Lake in 2007, and by 2010, carpeted most of the lake trout spawning areas. The mussels impact fry numbers by covering shallow rocky shoals and deep water rocks, where they spawn. The mussels, in high densities, block eggs from being protected in the rocks, making the eggs more vulnerable to predators. Native freshwater pearly mussels have also been negatively impacted by zebra mussels. Six different species of clams once occupied the soft bottoms, but as of 2016, no live clams were observed. In a 2013 study of the lake, other invasive species were found, including eurasian milfoil, japanese knotweed, purple loosestrife, curly leaf pondweed, rusty crayfish, and starry stonewort. In August 2020, the BFS announced that quagga mussels were discovered in the lake.

In 2003, the village of Cooperstown began a boat inspection system at the village boat launch. From May through October, all incoming boats and trailers are inspected. If any evidence exists that boats have been on other bodies of water, the boats are escorted to a washing station. The town of Springfield owned launch later started a similar program.

=== Pollution ===
When Glimmerglass State Park was opened in the 1960s, a sand-filtered, wastewater treatment system was built. This system allowed some pollutants to enter the lake through Shadow Brook, which increased nutrient levels in the lake. A new filtration system was built at the state park by 1977. Eutrophic indicators decreased from 10.4 percent in 1973, to 1.4 percent in 1981. By 1988, there were significant reductions in phosphorus concentrations as well. Then between 1988 and 1994, total phosphorus concentration increased, due to old septic systems around the lake failing as well as runoff from farms and forests. As a result, a ban on phosphate-containing detergents was enacted.

In 1998, the Village of Cooperstown switched from using sand to provide winter traction on the streets to using salt. Later BFS tests showed that the change had reduced phosphorus runoff significantly. Another factor that increased phosphorus input were the outdated septic systems around the lake. In 2004, an inventory was completed for all septic systems along the lake, including type, age, and maintenance history. In 2005, a five-year program of inspections was started, to perform a visual inspection of the septic tank, an inventory of wastewater discharges from the house, and an inspection of the absorption area. If a system failed, the owner had a year to replace and upgrade the system.

== Recreation ==
=== Fishing ===
On Otsego Lake, lake trout are the main species targeted by fishermen, as well as walleye and yellow perch. The lake also supports an exceptionally large smallmouth bass population. Other fish species present in the lake are brown trout, rock bass, largemouth bass, chain pickerel, Otsego bass, bluegill, redfin pickerel, pumpkinseed, and landlocked atlantic salmon. The lake is stocked each year with approximately 5,000 brown trout that are 8 to 10 inches (20 to 25 cm) long, approximately 5,000 lake trout that are 8 to 9 inches (20 to 23 cm) long and between 40,000 and 80,000 walleye that are 2 to 3 inches (5.1 to 7.6 cm). Also 5,000 landlocked atlantic salmon that are 5 to 6 inches (13 to 15 cm) long are stocked biennially.

There is a boat launch at the south end of the lake maintained by the Village of Cooperstown and a boat launch at the north end of the lake that is only available to residents who live in the Town of Springfield, and is maintained by the Town of Springfield. In 1990, the NYSDEC announced plans to build a boat launch at Glimmerglass State Park, which caused a debate on the use of power boats on the lake. Opponents of the new boat launch wanted all boats banned on the lake except those powered by paddle, sail or battery. During the summer, there are multiple bass tournaments to show off who can catch the most impressive sized bass.

Since the disappearance of the alewife, the more balanced lake ecosystem has caused the rebound of yellow perch and walleye populations, due to no competition from the invasive alewife. In early 2017, BFS researchers installed transponder tags in 500 adult walleyes while they spawned in tributaries at the north end of the lake. Afterwards, a warmwater gill net survey was conducted to recapture tagged walleye for a population estimate. Yellow perch were the most numerous captured, followed by walleye. Just over 65 percent of walleye caught were legal to keep (≥ 15 inches (38 cm)). Smallmouth bass were the most numerous Centrarchid caught, with over 76 percent being legal (≥ 12 inches (30 cm)).

=== Public swimming areas ===
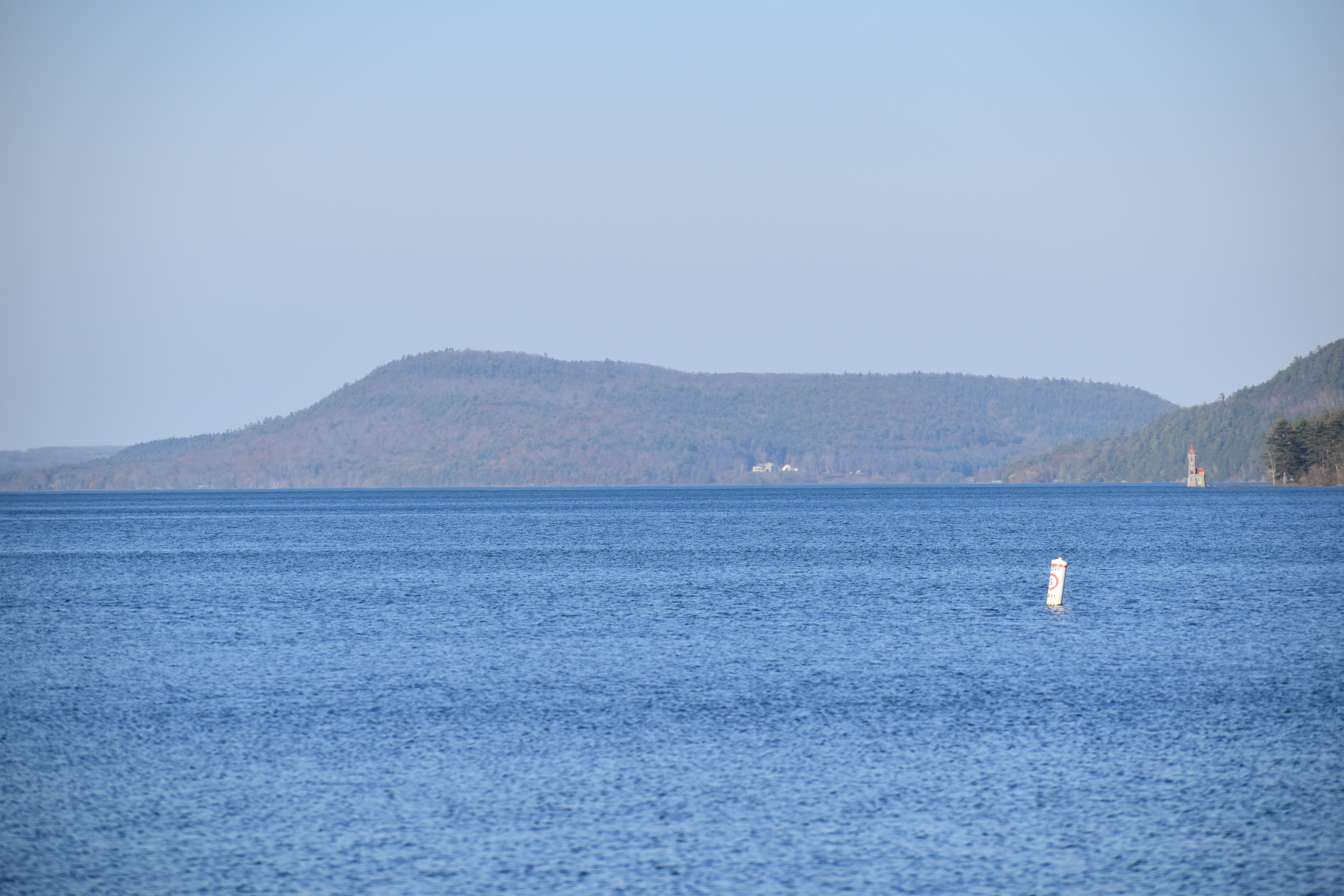
Looking north from boat launch with Mount Wellington in the background

Three Mile Point is a public swimming beach located three miles from Cooperstown along the western shore of the lake accessible via State Highway 80. It is open June through August and offers changing rooms, a picnic area, and a pavilion. Another swimming area is Fairy Springs and is located one mile of Cooperstown along the eastern shore of the lake accessible via County Road 31. It is open May through September and offers changing rooms, a picnic area, and a pavilion. Another swimming area, Public Landing, is at the northern end of the lake located at the end of Public Landing Road. This swimming area is only open to residents who live in the Town of Springfield and has changing rooms and a picnic area. Another area is Glimmerglass State Park, which is located at the north end of the lake and is accessed by County Route 31. It offers a beach, many picnic areas and a few pavilions.

=== Lakefront park ===
Lakefront park is located in the village of Cooperstown on the lake and is accessed by Pioneer Street, Lake Street or Fish Road. At this park are benches to sit at and view the lake and a stage where concerts are held in the summer months. From lakefront park, Mount Wellington is visible at the other end of the lake. When viewed from this park, the mountain looks like a "sleeping lion," which is the mountain's nickname. Also located in the park are the village docks where spaces can be rented to dock a boat. Most of the docks were damaged in the floods of 2011, and some have since been replaced.

== Appearances in literature ==
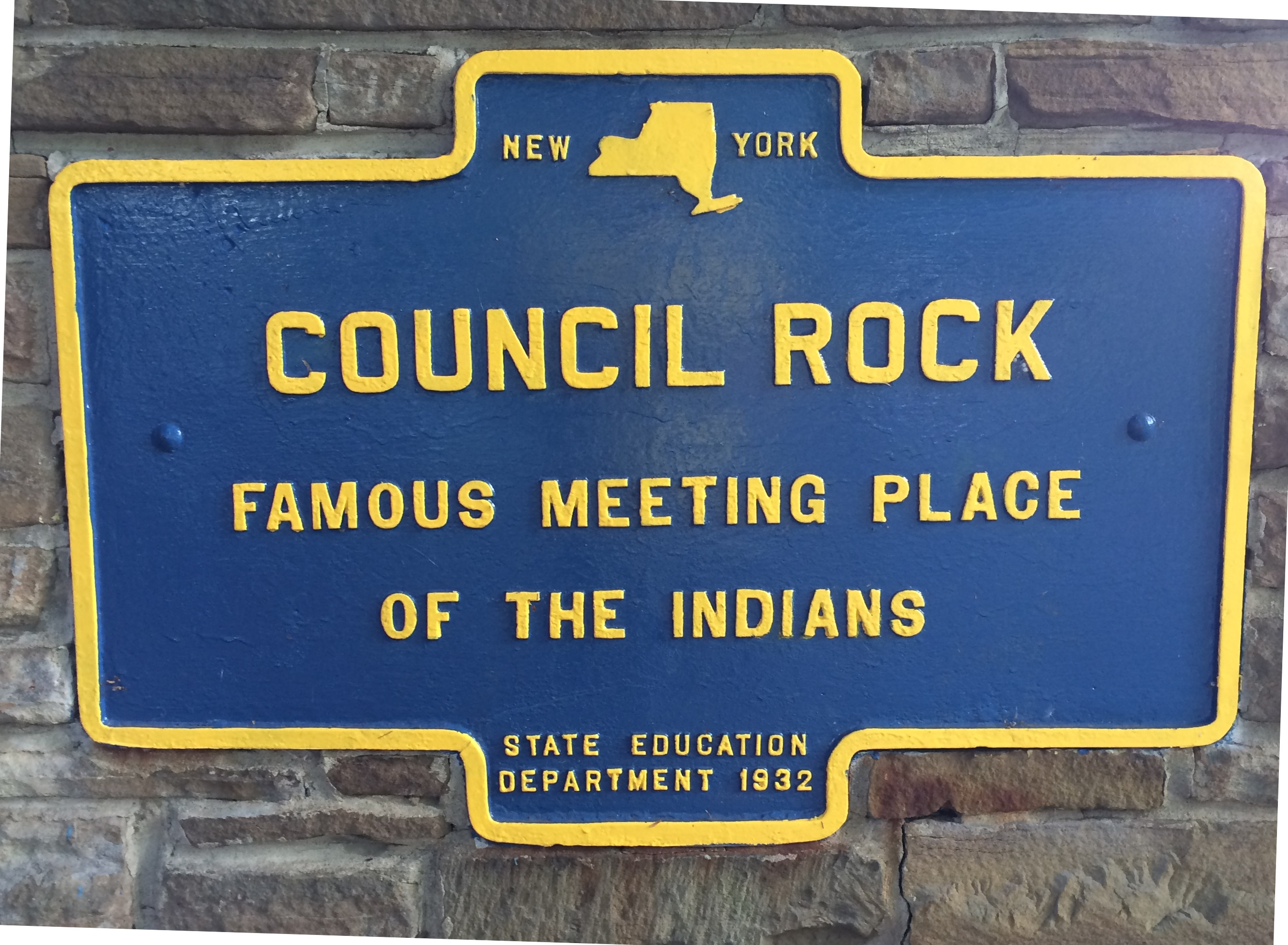
Historic marker for Council Rock

The lake was known to 19th century American writer James Fenimore Cooper as Glimmerglass and was a principal feature in his novels The Pioneers, The Deerslayer, and Home as Found in which local landmarks such as Council Rock, Hutters Point, Gravelly Point, and Sunken Island are mentioned. Set in 1740-1745, the historical novels describe the lake as being somewhat beyond the frontier, perhaps into French-controlled territory. When the novel was written in 1840, all of New York State was well within civilized territory. In the novel The Pioneers, Blackbird Bay is where Deerslayer rescues Ben Pump from drowning and the northern point that makes the Blackbird Bay is the location of an annual bass fishing expedition. In the novel The Deerslayer, Gravelly Point is the location where Deerslayer is fired upon by a Huron Indian, then Deerslayer returned fire and killed the Huron. Also in The Deerslayer, Peggs Point is the location where Deerslayer and Hurry Harry first reach the shore of Otsego Lake. It is also the location where Deerslayer departs the lake. Six Mile Point is the location in The Deerslayer that Natty Bumppo makes an unsuccessful effort to escape from the Hurons. In The Deerslayer, Three Mile Point is the location where Hetty Hutter docks to seek the Huron Indian camp which was further south at Muskrat Cove. In Home as Found, Three Mile Point is referred to as Fishing Point and is owned by the Effingham family. Hutter Point is where Deerslayer first saw the "Glimmerglass".

Otsego Lake is also referenced in The Secret of Mirror Bay, a novel in the Nancy Drew Mystery Stories series. In the story, Aunt Eloise invites Nancy and her friends to a cabin at Mirror Bay, in Cooperstown, to solve a case of a mysterious woman seen gliding across the water. Nancy is then involved in a vacation hoax because she resembles a woman involved in the hoax.

== See also ==
- List of lakes in New York
- Media related to Otsego Lake at Wikimedia Commons
