= National Register of Historic Places listings in Otsego County, New York =

Location of Otsego County in New York

Otsego County, New York, United States, has a number of properties and districts listed on the National Register of Historic Places. One property, Hyde Hall, is further designated a National Historic Landmark of the United States.

The locations of National Register properties and districts (at least for all showing latitude and longitude coordinates below) may be seen in a map by clicking on "Map of all coordinates".

This National Park Service list is complete through NPS recent listings posted August 7, 2026.

Contents: Counties in New York
Albany (Albany) – Allegany – Bronx – Broome – Cattaraugus – Cayuga – Chautauqua – Chemung – Chenango – Clinton – Columbia – Cortland – Delaware – Dutchess (Poughkeepsie, Rhinebeck) – Erie (Buffalo) – Essex – Franklin – Fulton – Genesee – Greene – Hamilton – Herkimer – Jefferson – Kings – Lewis – Livingston – Madison – Monroe (Rochester) – Montgomery – Nassau – New York (Below 14th Street, 14th to 59th Streets, 59th to 110th Streets, Above 110th Street, Islands) – Niagara (Niagara Falls) – Oneida – Onondaga (Syracuse) – Ontario – Orange – Orleans – Oswego – Otsego – Putnam – Queens – Rensselaer – Richmond – Rockland – St. Lawrence – Saratoga – Schenectady – Schoharie – Schuyler – Seneca – Steuben – Suffolk – Sullivan – Tioga – Tompkins – Ulster – Warren – Washington – Wayne – Westchester (Northern, Southern, New Rochelle, Peekskill, Yonkers) – Wyoming – Yates

== Listings county-wide ==
	Name on the Register	Image	Date listed	Location	City or town	Description
1	All Saints Chapel and Morris Family Burial Ground		November 24, 1997 (#97001455)	State Route 51, 3 mi (4.8 km) south of Morris; 42°30′33″N 75°17′19″W	Morris	
2	Baker Octagon Barn	Baker Octagon Barn	September 29, 1984 (#84002887)	State Route 28; 42°49′25″N 75°00′56″W	Richfield Springs	
3	Bassett Family House		August 11, 2004 (#04000823)	2399 Main St. 42°34′49″N 75°03′31″W	Mt. Vision	
4	Beardslee Farm		June 30, 2000 (#00000748)	State Route 80 at Cty Rd. 18; 42°37′34″N 75°19′14″W	Pittsfield	
5	Bresee Hall	Bresee Hall	April 12, 1984 (#84002892)	Hartwick Dr. 42°27′31″N 75°04′20″W	Oneonta	
6	Chapin Memorial Church	Chapin Memorial Church	September 12, 2002 (#02001049)	12 Ford Ave. 42°42′24″N 74°58′36″W	Oneonta	
7	Cherry Valley Village Historic District	Cherry Valley Village Historic District	April 28, 1988 (#88000472)	Roughly bounded by Alden St. and Montgomery St., Maple Ave. and Elm St., and Main St. 42°47′48″N 74°45′09″W	Cherry Valley	Boundary increase of 9,105 acres (36.85 km^{2}) added as Lindesay Patent Rural Historic District in 1995 (NRHP Reference#: 95001024).
8	Church Street Historic District		June 4, 1997 (#97000532)	Roughly bounded by Church, Sylvan, Gould, and Warren Sts. 42°51′21″N 74°59′02″W	Richfield Springs	
9	Cooperstown Historic District	Cooperstown Historic District	November 18, 1980 (#80002742)	State Route 28, State Route 80, and Main St. 42°42′07″N 74°55′32″W	Cooperstown	Boundary increase to include Fenimore Farm Stone Agricultural Buildings in 1997 (NRHP Reference#: 97000937).
10	The Cornfield		September 12, 2002 (#02001047)	655 Cty Rd. 26; 42°27′21″N 75°03′42″W	Fly Creek	
11	DeVillers-Cope Mills Historic District		May 26, 2026 (#100013037)	417, 423, 430 Myers Mills Road; 42°36′25″N 75°11′46″W	Mount Vision	
12	East Main Street Historic District	East Main Street Historic District	November 7, 1995 (#95001282)	Roughly, E. Main St. from Church St. to the Richfield Springs reservoirs 42°51′08″N 74°58′33″W	Richfield Springs	
13	East Springfield Union School	East Springfield Union School	April 26, 1996 (#96000483)	Approximately 0.5 mi (0.80 km) east of the junction of US 20 and Co. Rd. 31; 42°49′49″N 74°48′45″W	East Springfield	
14	Evangelical Lutheran Church		October 29, 2021 (#100007081)	4636 NY 28; 42°38′40″N 74°57′54″W	Hartwick Seminary	
15	Fairchild Mansion	Fairchild Mansion	February 12, 1974 (#74001294)	318 Main St. 42°27′21″N 75°03′34″W	Oneonta	
16	Warren Ferris House		March 8, 2016 (#16000063)	7637 NY 80; 42°49′39″N 74°52′54″W	Springfield Center	Exemplary 1894 Queen Anne house by local builder
17	Fly Creek Grange No. 844	Fly Creek Grange No. 844	February 25, 2004 (#04000097)	208 Cemetery Rd. 42°43′00″N 74°59′02″W	Fly Creek	
18	Fly Creek Historic District	Fly Creek Historic District	November 8, 2006 (#06001004)	State Route 28, State Route 80, County Road 26, Cemetery Rd., Goose St. Allison Rd., and Bissell Rd. 42°43′11″N 74°58′38″W	Fly Creek	
19	Fly Creek Methodist Church	Fly Creek Methodist Church	August 8, 1996 (#96000859)	Co. Rt. 26, north of the junction with State Route 28; 42°43′09″N 74°58′59″W	Fly Creek	
20	Ford Block	Ford Block	September 7, 1984 (#84002893)	188-202 Main St. 42°27′14″N 75°03′43″W	Oneonta	
21	Fortin Site	Fortin Site	November 28, 1980 (#80002743)	Address Restricted	Oneonta	
22	Gilbertsville Historic District	Gilbertsville Historic District	May 17, 1974 (#74001293)	Originally roughly bounded by Marion Ave., Cliff and Green Sts., Grover and Sylvan Sts.; later extended to approximate village borders 42°28′16″N 75°19′38″W	Gilbertsville	Boundary increase in 1982.
23	Gilbertsville Water Works		May 18, 2011 (#11000290)	Reservoir Rd. 42°29′37″N 75°23′23″W	Gilbertsville vicinity	
24	Glimmerglass Historic District	Glimmerglass Historic District	September 24, 1999 (#99001136)	Otsego Lake and Environs; 42°45′20″N 74°54′24″W	Cooperstown	
25	The Grove		July 10, 1980 (#100007742)	76 W Main St. 42°32′44″N 75°14′54″W	Morris	
26	Hartwick Historic District	Hartwick Historic District	August 20, 2013 (#13000610)	Roughly along New York State Route 205, County Road 11, and Weeks Road; 42°39′35″N 75°03′03″W	Hartwick	
27	House at 120 Balcom Road		July 8, 2024 (#100010480)	120 Balcom Road; 42°38′11″N 75°04′52″W	Mount Vision	Listing says "Mount Vernon" in error.
28	Hyde Hall	Hyde Hall	October 7, 1971 (#71000555)	South of Springfield Center in Glimmerglass State Park; 42°47′38″N 74°52′25″W	Springfield Center	
29	Hyde Hall Covered Bridge	Hyde Hall Covered Bridge	December 17, 1998 (#98001539)	East Lake Rd., over Shadow Brook; 42°47′25″N 74°51′50″W	East Springfield	
30	Kenyon Residences	Kenyon Residences	February 26, 2004 (#04000093)	60 and 62 Main St. 42°34′45″N 75°03′30″W	Mt. Vision	
31	Lunn-Musser Octagon Barn		September 29, 1984 (#84002897)	South of Garrattsville; 42°37′39″N 75°09′26″W	Garrattsville	
32	Major's Inn and Gilbert Block	Major's Inn and Gilbert Block	April 11, 1973 (#73001249)	Both sides of Commercial St. near State Route 51; 42°28′17″N 75°19′39″W	Gilbertsville	
33	Andrew Mann Inn	Andrew Mann Inn	January 10, 1980 (#80002747)	33 Riverside Rd. 42°19′14″N 75°23′28″W	Unadilla	
34	Mathewson–Bice Farmhouse and Mathewson Family Cemetery		May 28, 2013 (#13000331)	204 Bice Rd. 42°41′38″N 74°59′03″W	Cooperstown vicinity	Late 18th-century farmhouse's design reflects owners' New England origins; family cemetery dates to 1813.
35	Middlefield District No. 1 School		August 13, 1987 (#87001363)	CR 35; 42°41′23″N 74°49′46″W	Cooperstown	
36	Middlefield Hamlet Historic District	Middlefield Hamlet Historic District	July 11, 1985 (#85001523)	CR 35, Rezen, Whiteman, and Long Patent Rds. 42°41′14″N 74°50′29″W	Middlefield	
37	Morris-Lull Farm		December 7, 2005 (#05001389)	133 Peet Rd. 42°31′24″N 75°14′57″W	Morris	
38	Morris Village Historic District		February 20, 2013 (#13000031)	Main, Lake, Broad, Grove & Church, 42°32′55″N 75°14′43″W	Morris	Intact core of 19th-century village settled by refugees from Revolutionary France
39	Municipal Building	Municipal Building	October 29, 1982 (#82001233)	238-242 Main St. 42°27′16″N 75°03′41″W	Oneonta	
40	Benjamin D. North House		July 11, 1985 (#85001499)	State Route 166, The Plank Rd. 42°42′12″N 74°50′08″W	Middlefield	
41	Old Hartwick Village Cemetery		August 20, 2013 (#13000611)	2862 County Road 11; 42°39′34″N 75°03′13″W	Hartwick vicinity	
42	Old Post Office	Old Post Office	November 17, 1978 (#78001895)	Main St. 42°27′17″N 75°03′38″W	Oneonta	
43	Oneonta Armory	Oneonta Armory	March 2, 1995 (#95000078)	4 Academy St. 42°27′03″N 75°03′56″W	Oneonta	
44	Oneonta Downtown Historic District	Oneonta Downtown Historic District	December 4, 2003 (#03001245)	Main, Chestnut, Dietz, Market, Elm, Water, Wall, S. Main Sts. 42°27′15″N 75°03′44″W	Oneonta	
45	Oneonta Theatre	Oneonta Theatre	May 22, 2002 (#02000555)	47 Chestnut St. 42°27′09″N 75°04′23″W	Oneonta	
46	Otsdawa Baptist Church	Otsdawa Baptist Church	March 6, 2002 (#02000143)	Cty Rd. 8; 42°29′11″N 75°10′25″W	Otsdawa	
47	Otsdawa Creek Site		July 22, 1980 (#80002746)	Address Restricted	Otego	
48	Otsego County Courthouse	Otsego County Courthouse	June 20, 1972 (#72000902)	193 Main St. 42°42′03″N 74°55′48″W	Cooperstown	
49	Joseph Peck House		April 17, 2025 (#100010980)	830 Pegg Rd; 42°35′12″N 75°11′08″W	New Lisbon	
50	Roseboom Historic District	Roseboom Historic District	November 19, 1998 (#98001394)	Roughly along State Route 166, State Route 165, Beaver, John Deer and Gage Rds. 42°44′21″N 74°46′16″W	Roseboom	
51	Russ-Johnsen Site		July 22, 1980 (#80002748)	Address Restricted	Unadilla	
52	Rutherford House		December 3, 2019 (#100004733)	26 East St. 42°41′52″N 75°14′32″W	Edmeston	Intact 1868 Italianate villa built for local doctor; later used as hotel
53	St. Mary's Episcopal Church Complex	St. Mary's Episcopal Church Complex	March 17, 2015 (#15000094)	7690 NY 80; 42°49′45″N 74°52′44″W	Springfield Center	Fin de siècle church buildings in unusual combination of Shingle and Gothic Revival styles.
54	St. Stephen's Chapel		March 3, 2021 (#100006199)	124 Cty. Rd. 10; 42°29′43″N 75°14′51″W	Morris	
55	Schuyler Lake Stone Church		January 22, 2025 (#100010979)	7378 NY 28; 42°46′50″N 75°01′40″W	Schuyler Lake	
56	South Worcester Historic District	South Worcester Historic District	November 5, 1992 (#92001563)	Junction of County Route 40 and County Route 39 and west along Route 40; 42°31′01″N 74°45′25″W	South Worcester	
57	Springfield Center Elementary School	Springfield Center Elementary School	August 24, 2011 (#11000601)	129 County Road 29A; 42°49′56″N 74°51′46″W	Springfield Center	
58	Stonehouse Farm		November 19, 1980 (#80002744)	East of Oneonta on State Route 7; 42°28′14″N 75°00′08″W	Oneonta	
59	Sunnyside		March 10, 1988 (#88000211)	72 E. Main St. 42°51′07″N 74°58′42″W	Richfield Springs	
60	Swart-Wilcox House	Swart-Wilcox House	May 24, 1990 (#90000817)	Junction of Wilcox Ave. and Henry St. 42°26′38″N 75°04′15″W	Oneonta	
61	The Tepee	The Tepee	August 18, 2011 (#11000543)	7632 US 20; 42°48′28″N 74°41′04″W	Cherry Valley vicinity	
62	Tianderah		November 2, 1978 (#78001894)	Off State Route 51; 42°27′50″N 75°18′54″W	Gilbertsville	
63	Tunnicliff-Jordan House		September 24, 2010 (#10000796)	68–72 Main Street; 42°51′09″N 74°58′38″W	Richfield Springs	
64	Tuttle-Peck House		February 3, 2025 (#100011420)	838 Pegg Road; 42°35′14″N 75°11′07″W	New Lisbon	
65	Twentieth Century Steam Riding Gallery No. 409	Twentieth Century Steam Riding Gallery No. 409	January 16, 1998 (#97001618)	Race St. 42°32′48″N 74°49′37″W	Schenevus	
66	Unadilla Forks School		August 28, 1998 (#98001117)	113 State Route 18A; 42°50′35″N 75°14′13″W	Unadilla Forks	
67	Unadilla Village Historic District	Unadilla Village Historic District	September 4, 1992 (#92001079)	Roughly, Main St. from Hopkins St. to Butternut Rd. and Bridge St. from Main to Watson St. 42°19′24″N 75°18′32″W	Unadilla	
68	Unadilla Waterworks		September 4, 1992 (#92001080)	Junction of Kilkenny Rd. and Clifton St. and junction of Martin Brook Rd. and Rod & Gun Club Rd. 42°20′22″N 75°19′03″W	Unadilla	
69	US Post Office-Cooperstown	US Post Office-Cooperstown	November 17, 1988 (#88002473)	28-40 Main St. 42°42′01″N 74°55′24″W	Cooperstown	
70	US Post Office-Richfield Springs	US Post Office-Richfield Springs	May 11, 1989 (#88002422)	152 Main St. 42°51′11″N 74°59′04″W	Richfield Springs	
71	Lemuel F. Vibber House		June 21, 2016 (#16000393)	302 Butternut Rd. 42°50′33″N 74°58′30″W	Richfield vicinity	Early 19th-century residence is only remnant of early industrial hamlet of Federal Corner
72	Walnut Street Historic District	Walnut Street Historic District	July 30, 1980 (#80002745)	Ford Ave., Walnut, Dietz, Elm and Maple Sts. 42°27′25″N 75°03′42″W	Oneonta	
73	West Burlington Memorial Church	West Burlington Memorial Church	January 16, 2001 (#00001661)	State Route 80; 42°42′25″N 75°11′16″W	West Burlington	
74	West Main Street-West James Street Historic District	West Main Street-West James Street Historic District	March 17, 1994 (#94000257)	Roughly, along W. Main, W. James, Elm and Center Sts. and Taylor Ave. 42°51′12″N 74°59′19″W	Richfield Springs	
75	The White House		September 4, 2012 (#12000598)	108 White House Rd. 42°41′14″N 75°03′18″W	Hartwick	
76	George I. Wilber House	George I. Wilber House	November 15, 2000 (#00001381)	11 Ford Ave. 42°27′19″N 75°03′43″W	Oneonta	
77	Women's Community Club of South Valley		February 1, 1999 (#98001617)	472 Kirshman Hill Rd. 42°42′21″N 74°42′40″W	South Valley	
78	Worcester Historic District	Worcester Historic District	June 10, 1975 (#75001221)	Both sides of Main St. (State Route 7) between Decatur and Cook Sts. 42°35′31″N 74°45′00″W	Worcester	
79	Roswell Wright House	Roswell Wright House	September 1, 1988 (#88001271)	25 Main St. 42°19′32″N 75°18′38″W	Unadilla	
80	Zion Episcopal Church Complex and Harmony Cemetery	Zion Episcopal Church Complex and Harmony Cemetery	November 24, 1997 (#97001456)	East of Morris, State Route 51; 42°32′56″N 75°14′35″W	Morris	

== Former listing ==
	Name on the Register	Image	Date listed	Date removed	Location	City or town	Description
1	Oneonta State Normal School		December 12, 1976 (#77001582)	August 1, 1977	State St.	Oneonta	Listing is for the Old Main building, which was demolished in February 1977.

== See also ==
- National Register of Historic Places listings in New York
