= Harmony Cemetery =

Harmony Cemetery can refer to:

== United States ==
- Columbian Harmony Cemetery, a former cemetery in Washington, D.C.
- Harmony Cemetery and Zion Episcopal Church, a historic cemetery in Morris, New York
- Harmony Cemetery in Marlowe, West Virginia
- Harmony Chapel and Cemetery in Harmony, Rhode Island
- Harmony Grove Cemetery in Salem, Massachusetts
- National Harmony Memorial Park in Landover, Maryland
