= Morris, New York =

- Town
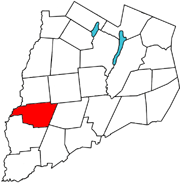
- Otsego County map with the Town of Morris in red
- Coordinates: 42.5487°N 75.2452°W
- Country: United States
- State: New York
- County: Otsego

Area
  - Total: 39.19 sq mi (101.51 km^{2})
  - Land: 39.07 sq mi (101.18 km^{2})
  - Water: 0.13 sq mi (0.33 km^{2})
- Elevation: 1,145 ft (349 m)

Population (2010)
  - Total: 1,878
  - Estimate (2016): 1,791
  - Density: 46/sq mi (17.7/km^{2})
- Time zone: UTC-5 (Eastern (EST))
  - Summer (DST): UTC-4 (EDT)
- ZIP code: 13808
- Area code: 607
- FIPS code: 36-077-48494

Morris is a town located in Otsego County, New York, United States. As of the 2010 census, the town had a population of 1,878. It is named after General Jacob Morris.

Town of Morris is located on the western border of the county. The Village of Morris is located within the town. It is northwest of the City of Oneonta.

== History ==
The town was settled around 1770.

Morris was formed from the Town of Butternuts in April 1849. The town was named after General Jacob Morris (the son of Lewis Morris, a signer of the Declaration of Independence), who was granted land due to property lost during the revolution. In 1859, a part of Town of Pittsfield was transferred to Morris.

Historical data shows a population of 2155 in 1850, 2038 in 1855, 2320 in 1860, 2191 in 1865, 2253 in 1870, and 2303 in 1875. After this, local population declined, the textile mills closed, numbers of sheep plummeted, hops began to give way to dairying, and the local bank failed after speculating in silver mines in New Mexico.

There were several projected railroad lines through the vicinity after the mid-19th century. The most promising was a Sidney to Utica trolley line sponsored by Silas Kelsey of Burlington. At the same time, Dr. Lewis Morris, who owned the Unadilla Valley Railroad, was sponsoring his own railroad extension from New Berlin through Morris to Oneonta, where he intended to have an interchange yard with the Delaware & Hudson and Ulster & Delaware railroad lines, land which he donated to Oneonta in 1914, as Neahwa Park. Surveys for both routes were completed and staked, but not all of the right of ways given, and the trolley line was built in the Otego Valley instead.

The Morris-Lull Farm, All Saints Chapel and Morris Family Burial Ground, Zion Episcopal Church Complex and Harmony Cemetery, and St. Stephen's Chapel (in the hamlet of Maple Grove) are listed on the National Register of Historic Places.

From 2006 to 2021, Morris was the primary filming location for the original screenplay Portal Master. The sequel is currently in production.

== Geography ==
According to the United States Census Bureau, the town has a total area of 39.1 square miles (101 km^{2}), of which 39.0 square miles (101 km^{2}) is land and 0.1 square miles (0.26 km^{2}) (0.23%) is water.

According to the 1878 history, Morris contained 24,035 acres (97.27 km^{2}), assessed valuation $834,276, equalized $502,331. In 1864, Morris had improved 18,481 acres (74.79 km^{2}), 3,081 acres (12.47 km^{2}) of plowed land, 7,772 acres (31.45 km^{2}) of pasture, and 5,727 acres (23.18 km^{2}) of meadow. By 1875, this had increased to 9,368 acres (37.91 km^{2}) of plowed, 8,519 acres (34.48 km^{2}) pastured and 6,680 acres (27.0 km^{2}) mowed. Today the few remaining dairy farms are at least one hundred cow dairies.

New York State Route 23 and New York State Route 51 intersect at Morris village.

The western town line is defined by the Unadilla River. Butternut Creek, flowing southward through Morris, is a tributary of the Unadilla River.

== Demographics ==
Historical population
| Census | Pop. | Note | %± |
|---|---|---|---|
| 1850 | 2,155 | | — |
| 1860 | 2,320 | | 7.7% |
| 1870 | 2,253 | | −2.9% |
| 1880 | 2,404 | | 6.7% |
| 1890 | 1,920 | | −20.1% |
| 1900 | 1,689 | | −12.0% |
| 1910 | 1,434 | | −15.1% |
| 1920 | 1,207 | | −15.8% |
| 1930 | 1,355 | | 12.3% |
| 1940 | 1,376 | | 1.5% |
| 1950 | 1,440 | | 4.7% |
| 1960 | 1,525 | | 5.9% |
| 1970 | 1,630 | | 6.9% |
| 1980 | 1,780 | | 9.2% |
| 1990 | 1,787 | | 0.4% |
| 2000 | 1,867 | | 4.5% |
| 2010 | 1,878 | | 0.6% |
| 2016 (est.) | 1,791 | ▼ | −4.6% |
U.S. Decennial Census

As of the census of 2000, there were 1,867 people, 737 households, and 529 families residing in the town. The population density was 47.8 inhabitants per square mile (18.5/km^{2}). There were 859 housing units at an average density of 22.0 per square mile (8.5/km^{2}). The racial makeup of the town was 96.84% White, 0.64% Black or African American, 0.11% Native American, 0.21% Asian, 0.11% Pacific Islander, 0.86% from other races, and 1.23% from two or more races. Hispanic or Latino people of any race were 1.66% of the population.

There were 737 households, out of which 33.9% had children under the age of 18 living with them, 55.1% were married couples living together, 12.1% had a female householder with no husband present, and 28.1% were non-families. 23.3% of all households were made up of individuals, and 9.2% had someone living alone who was 65 years of age or older. The average household size was 2.53 and the average family size was 2.92.

In the town, the population was spread out, with 27.0% under the age of 18, 5.7% from 18 to 24, 27.4% from 25 to 44, 26.3% from 45 to 64, and 13.5% who were 65 years of age or older. The median age was 38 years. For every 100 females, there were 92.1 males. For every 100 females age 18 and over, there were 90.8 males.

The median income for a household in the town was $34,176, and the median income for a family was $38,750. Males had a median income of $28,824 versus $22,083 for females. The per capita income for the town was $17,427. About 9.5% of families and 12.9% of the population were below the poverty line, including 17.7% of those under age 18 and 5.6% of those age 65 or over.

== Communities and locations ==
- Church Corners – a location in the southwestern part of Morris on County Highway
- Collier Bridge – a location west of Morris village, located by Morris Brook
- Dimmock Hollow – north of Morris Manor in the western part of town bordering on Butternuts, with Morris Brook flowing through it; scene of a cannon explosion during a Republican meeting in 1884 that killed three men, commemorated by a stone marker on route 23
- Elm Grove – a hamlet northeast of Morris village, located on County Highway 49. Originally planned by Louis DeVilliers, he moved north to New Lisbon and sold to Robert Bowne, who built a woolen mill here in 1815 and subdivided land to employees.
- Filer Corners – a location in the southern part of the town, north of Maple Grove, former site of the stone schoolhouse now at the Farmer's Museum, Cooperstown
- Harris Hill – an elevation west of Morris
- Maple Grove – a hamlet at the southern town line on County Highway 10 that once had several blacksmith shops, a rake factory, a dance hall, cooper shop, store, post office, church and large steam sawmill. The church, St. Stephen's Chapel is on the National Register of Historic Places as a good example of a mission chapel.
- Morris – The Village of Morris is located at the junction of NY-23 and NY-51, as well as Butternut Creek. Founded as "Louisville" by French immigrants, the name was changed due to a conflicting post office by that same name in St. Lawrence County, NY when incorporated in 1870.
- Morris Manor – A sprawling complex of farm outbuildings and tenant houses on the Gen. Jacob Morris estate on route 51 just north of the town line, including the Morris Chapel, site of the first sawmill in town, and later a gristmill, woolen mill, brickyards and iron furnace at Bailey's Mills a short distance north. Said furnace refined bog iron ore, used in the fence surrounding the nearby Hannah Cooper monument on route 51.
- Saint Marys Falls – a waterfall located southwest of the Village of Morris
- South New Berlin – The northern side of US route 23 east of the bridge over the Unadilla River; actually lies within the Town of Morris (the south side in Butternuts). The majority of this community is west of the river in the Town of New Berlin, Chenango County.

== Notable businesses ==
- Benjamin Chair Factory, at Elm Grove, was purchased c. 1856 by the Rice Brothers who cast steel plows there, and operated until 1942, by successive generations George, Andrew and Samuel Benjamin, produced thousands of variants of hardwood chairs, the seats of which were caned in local homes by housewives of millworkers. Most prized today are the hand-carved rose back design with handle hole. The factory also produced other furniture and custom millwork, later taken over by Harry Page Decker and then Don Sutter, who made army cots when closed. Ken Kelso later removed much of the contents when establishing Hanford Mills in East Meredith, NY as a museum.
- The Linn Manufacturing Corp, 1916–1949, was the maker of the Linn tractor. This was a heavy-duty commercial type of halftrack, originally for highway and farm use, carrying twice their own weight with as much as ten times that on trailers or sleds behind. They were notable in their use in motorizing log or freight hauling on ice roads, with full contour following flexible traction, but otherwise had the conventional features and operation of the common truck. Engine and driveline components were purchased and casting made elsewhere; the rest was built on-site from local materials 1917–1952. Approximately 120 exist today of a possible 2500 units produced. A radical convertible truck-to-tractor design, known as the C5, was built under design of Phillip Sloan from Ohio, briefly in the former Stewart Truck plant in Buffalo before production returned to Morris, where it was rebranded in 1941 as the Linn Catruk. During World War II, tractors and cargo trailers were made for the military, in addition to V&O Press shell trimming machine, Remington Rand and Scintilla subcontract work, including aircraft magneto pole shoes. The 60 hp (45 kW) Fitz steel overshot waterwheel, originally powering the plant machinery and village dynamo, was at one time the largest on the East Coast.
- Dr. Naylor's is the only active manufacturer today, maker of Dr. Naylor's Udder Balm. Their original product was medicated teat dilators for dairy cattle.
- R. R. Ripley - 1890s–1920s, manufacturer of woodenware for agriculture and dairy use, a common rural industry. Ripley invented a saw device with a sideways blade to carve out the hollow of ladles and shovels, making mass production possible. Disston Co. agreed to supply Ripley the blades on condition they were not held liable.
- George Sanderson - pharmacist and manufacturer of his own label "headache powder".
- S. S. Seeley's - c. 1850s-1880s, Silas S. Seeley (1820–1884) sold embossed bottled flavoring extracts, scents, Anderson's Dermador skin products, and carved butter molds.

== Notable people ==
- Andrew G. Chatfield, lawyer, member and speaker pro tempore of the New York State Assembly, later served as a judge in Wisconsin and Minnesota; born in Morris while it was still part of Butternuts; brother of Levi S. Chatfield
- Levi S. Chatfield, lawyer, member and Speaker of the New York State Assembly, later New York State Attorney General; at one time the majority shareholder of the Atlantic and Pacific Railroad - born in Morris while it was still part of Butternuts; brother of Andrew G. Chatfield
- Richard Franchot, 1816–1875, town supervisor, congressman for 19th District, Civil War recruiter and colonel in 121st NY, Albany & Suquehanna (D&H) RR president and surveyor of one of the earliest proposed trans-Adirondack routes
- G. McMurtrie Godley, diplomat, United States Ambassador to Laos (1969–1973)
- Francis M. Rotch, 1822–1863, Harvard University graduate and NY state senator
