= Morris Village Historic District =

Historic district in New York, United States

- U.S. National Register of Historic Places
- U.S. Historic district
- Location within New York Location within the United States
- Location: Main, Lake, Broad, Grove & Church,, Morris, New York
- Coordinates: 42°32′55″N 75°14′43″W
- Area: 179.15 acres (72.50 ha)
- Built: c. 1800
- Architectural style: Late Victorian, Late 19th and 20th Century Revivals
- NRHP reference No.: 13000031
- Added to NRHP: February 20, 2013

Morris Village Historic District is a national historic district located at Morris in Otsego County, New York. The district encompasses 287 contributing buildings and 3 contributing sites in the village of Morris. The buildings date from about 1800 through the 1960s, and include representative examples of popular architectural styles. Located in the district is the separately listed Zion Episcopal Church Complex and Harmony Cemetery. Other notable buildings include the Otsego County Fairgrounds complex, First Baptist Church (1869), Methodist Church (1870), former Universalist Church (1841), former Post Office (1883-1884), Community Bank (c. 1820–1830, 1929), Kenyon Library (1845), and Town of Morris Highway Department (c. 1920).

It was listed on the National Register of Historic Places in 2013.
