= Unadilla (village), New York =

Unadilla, New York
- Village
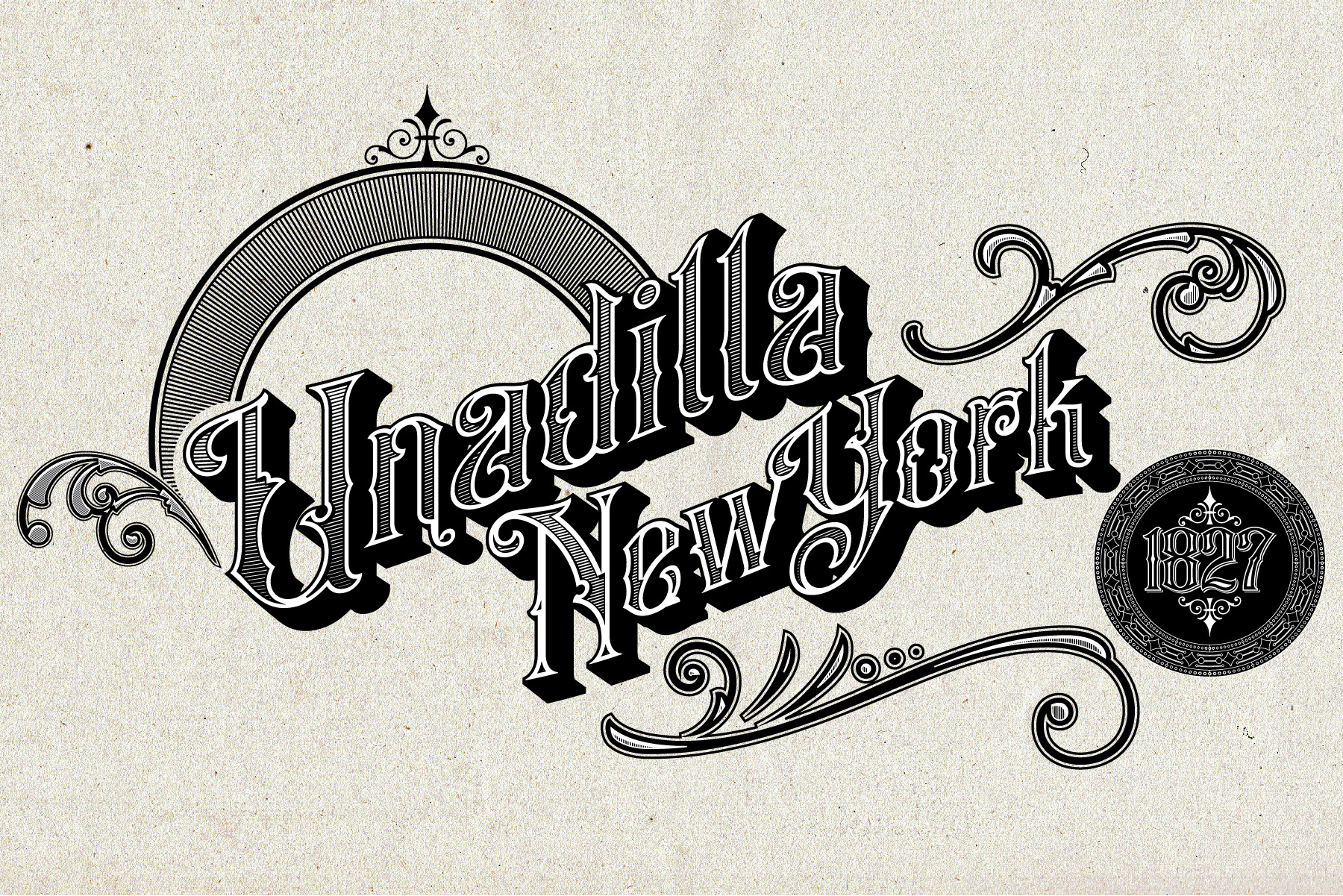

- Location within the state of New York
- Coordinates: 42°19′36″N 75°18′54″W
- Country: United States
- State: New York
- County: Otsego

Area
  - Total: 1.08 sq mi (2.81 km^{2})
  - Land: 1.03 sq mi (2.68 km^{2})
  - Water: 0.050 sq mi (0.13 km^{2})
- Elevation: 1,010 ft (308 m)

Population (2020)
  - Total: 1,065
  - Density: 1,027/sq mi (396.7/km^{2})
- Time zone: UTC-5 (Eastern (EST))
  - Summer (DST): UTC-4 (EDT)
- ZIP code: 13849
- Area code: 607
- FIPS code: 36-76001
- GNIS feature ID: 0968118
- Website: https://villageofunadilla.com/

Unadilla is a village located in the town of Unadilla in Otsego County, New York, United States. The population was 1,128 at the 2010 census. The village is located in the southern part of the town, southwest of Oneonta. The community nickname is, "The Village Beautiful."

== History ==
The town was originally the site of a Seneca Indian village at the confluence of the Susquehanna and Unadilla Rivers, where the village of Sidney (in Delaware County) is now located. The name Unadilla, which represents one spelling from a number of different interpretations of several Iroquois dialects, is said to mean "Meeting Place", indicating the place where two rivers meet.

Unadilla was first settled by whites around 1770. The location of the village now called Unadilla was first settled about the same time by a group of Scots-Irish at the junction of the Ouleout Creek and the Susquehanna River. Both villages were destroyed by the Continental Army in October 1778 because they were being used by Loyalists as a base for raiding frontier communities.

Shortly thereafter, Unadilla Village was again settled, and originally called "Wattles Ferry," It grew after it became an important stop for travel west: the Catskill Turnpike crossed the Susquehanna at Wattles Ferry, located in the eastern end of the village. Eventually, the turnpikes were replaced in importance by the Albany and Susquehanna Railroad (later the Delaware and Hudson Railway). The small community continued to take advantage of this progress and prosper.

Unadilla incorporated as a village in 1827, finally incorporated in 1889.

The village contains many historical homes, some built before the Civil War.

Unadilla's Boy Scout Troop #1 was chartered in 1910, and is recognized as the oldest continuously operating troop in the United States.

The Unadilla Village Historic District and Roswell Wright House are listed on the National Register of Historic Places.

== Notable person ==
- Louis Agassiz Fuertes (1874–1927), ornithologist and artist, died in a railroad accident near Unadilla.

== Geography ==
Unadilla is located at 42°19′36″N 75°18′53″W (42.326694, -75.314863).

According to the United States Census Bureau, the village has a total area of 1.1 square miles (2.8 km^{2}), all land.

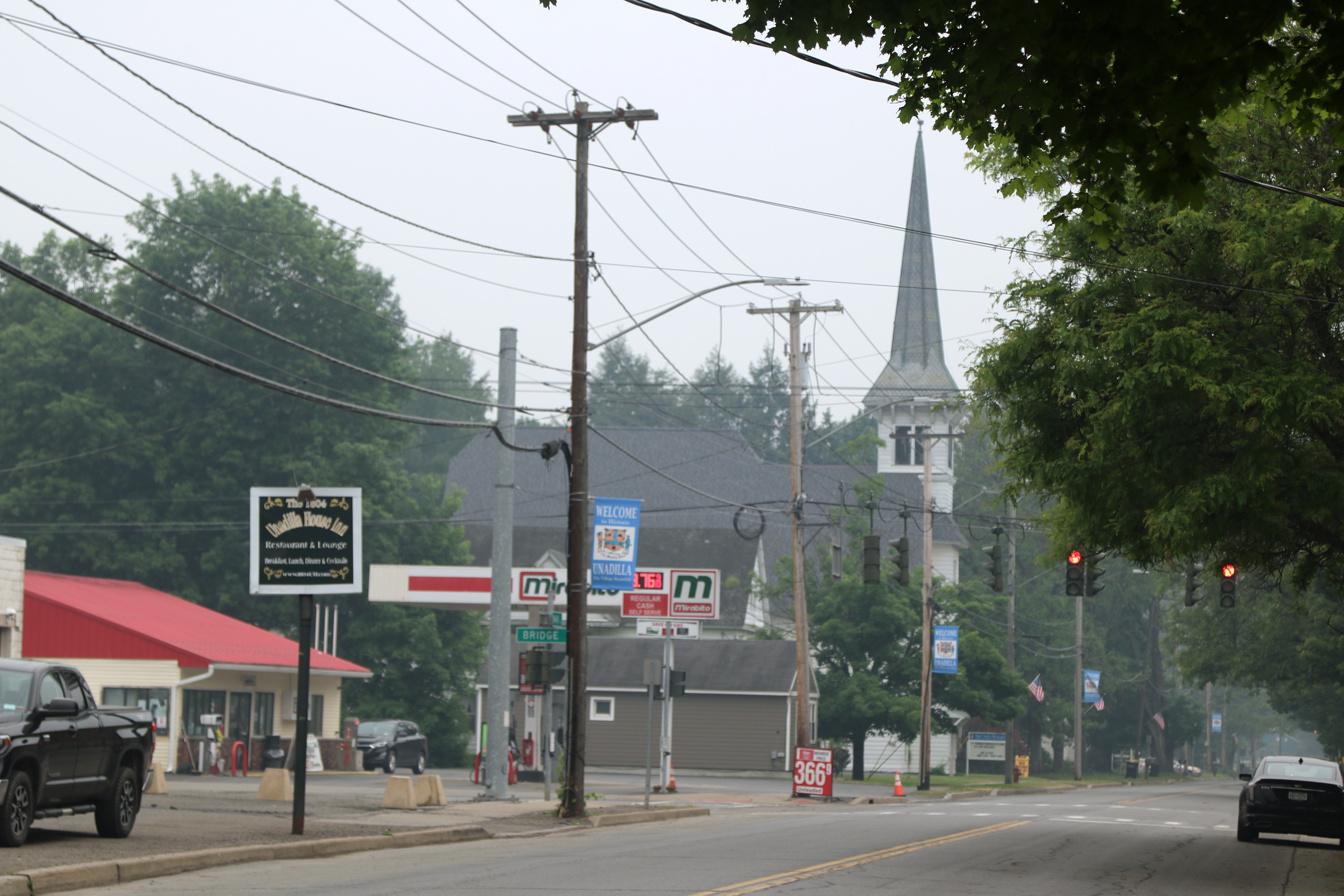
The corner of Main Street and Bridge Street in the village of Unadilla, New York.

The Village of Unadilla is located in Otsego County, adjacent to the Susquehanna River by the county line shared with Delaware County. The village is about three miles upstream from the Village of Sidney located in Delaware County. The Village of Unadilla is located in the south part of the Town of Unadilla on New York Route 7 (Main Street) and north of Interstate 88.

== Demographics ==
Historical population
Census	Pop.	Note	%±
1870	875		—
1880	922		5.4%
1890	1,157		25.5%
1900	1,172		1.3%
1910	1,009		−13.9%
1920	1,157		14.7%
1930	1,063		−8.1%
1940	1,079		1.5%
1950	1,317		22.1%
1960	1,586		20.4%
1970	1,489		−6.1%
1980	1,367		−8.2%
1990	1,265		−7.5%
2000	1,127		−10.9%
2010	1,128		0.1%
2020	1,065		−5.6%
U.S. Decennial Census

As of the census of 2000, there were 1,127 people, 470 households, and 314 families residing in the village. The population density was 1,045.2 inhabitants per square mile (403.6/km^{2}). There were 542 housing units at an average density of 502.7 per square mile (194.1/km^{2}). The racial makeup of the village was 97.07% White, 0.53% Black or African American, 0.18% Native American, 0.09% Asian, 0.09% Pacific Islander, 1.42% from other races, and 0.62% from two or more races. Hispanic or Latino of any race were 1.06% of the population.

There were 470 households, out of which 30.2% had children under the age of 18 living with them, 48.7% were married couples living together, 13.2% had a female householder with no husband present, and 33.0% were non-families. 28.1% of all households were made up of individuals, and 13.8% had someone living alone who was 65 years of age or older. The average household size was 2.40 and the average family size was 2.91.

In the village, the population was spread out, with 24.5% under the age of 18, 9.8% from 18 to 24, 25.5% from 25 to 44, 23.2% from 45 to 64, and 17.0% who were 65 years of age or older. The median age was 40 years. For every 100 females, there were 92.0 males. For every 100 females age 18 and over, there were 87.4 males.

The median income for a household in the village was $34,886, and the median income for a family was $39,097. Males had a median income of $29,808 versus $22,500 for females. The per capita income for the village was $19,687. About 11.1% of families and 10.8% of the population were below the poverty line, including 20.7% of those under age 18 and 2.1% of those age 65 or over.
