= Springbrook =

Springbrook may refer to:

== Places ==
=== Australia ===
- Springbrook, Queensland
  - Springbrook National Park, Queensland
  - Springbrook State School, a heritage-listed building in the park
  - Springbrook Road, a heritage-listed road

=== Canada ===
- Springbrook, Alberta
- Springbrook, a community in Stirling-Rawdon, Ontario
- Springbrook, Prince Edward Island

=== United States ===
- Springbrook, Iowa
- Springbrook, North Dakota
- Springbrook, Oregon
- Springbrook, Wisconsin, a town
- Springbrook (community), Wisconsin, an unincorporated community
- Springbrook Airport, Jackson County, Oregon
- Springbrook High School, Silver Spring, Maryland
- Springbrook Nature Center, Fridley, Minnesota
- Springbrook State Park, Guthrie County, Iowa

== Other uses ==
- Springbrook (organization), a non-profit organization in Oneonta, New York, US

== See also ==
- Spring Brook (disambiguation)
