= Spring Brook =

Spring Brook may refer to

- Spring Brook Township, Kittson County, Minnesota
- Spring Brook (Susquehanna River tributary), a river in New York
- Spring Brook (Beaver Kill), a river in New York
- Spring Brook, New York, a hamlet in Erie County
- Spring Brook Township, Pennsylvania
- Spring Brook, Wisconsin
- Spring Brook (Lackawanna River)
- Spring Brook (Santa Ana River), California
- Spring Brook, a small river in southeast London, England; a tributary of the River Ravensbourne

== See also ==
- Springbrook (disambiguation)
