= Unadilla Waterworks =

- U.S. National Register of Historic Places
- U.S. Historic district
- Location within New York Location within the United States
- Location: Jct. of Kilkenny Rd. and Clifton St. and jct. of Martin Brook Rd. and Rod & Gun Club Rd., Unadilla, New York
- Coordinates: 42°20′22″N 75°19′3″W
- Area: 105 acres (42 ha)
- Built: 1880-1991
- MPS: Unadilla Village MPS
- NRHP reference No.: 92001080
- Added to NRHP: September 4, 1992

Unadilla Waterworks is a historic waterworks and national historic district located at Unadilla in Otsego County, New York. It encompasses one contributing building and 11 contributing structures. It consists of two separate sites that were developed between 1880 and 1891 to supply the village with water for fire protection and domestic use.

It was listed on the National Register of Historic Places in 1992.
