= Tunnicliff-Jordan House =

Historic house in New York, United States

- U.S. National Register of Historic Places
- Location within New York Location within the United States
- Location: 68–72 Main Street, Richfield Springs, New York
- Coordinates: 42°51′14″N 74°59′30″W
- Area: 0.9 acres (0.36 ha)
- Built: 1810
- Architectural style: Greek Revival
- NRHP reference No.: 10000796
- Added to NRHP: September 24, 2010

Tunnicliff-Jordan House is a historic home located at Richfield Springs in Otsego County, New York. The house consists of three blocks. The main block was built between 1810 and 1835 and is a 2-story, four-bay, square plan building with a hipped roof. A 1 1/2-story, gable-roofed frame ell dated between 1830 and 1850 extends from the rear. A narrow single-story lean-to, originally added to the ell about 1850, was remodeled for residential use about 1939. The main entrance has a simple Greek Revival style entablature.

It was listed on the National Register of Historic Places in 2010.
