= Fairchild Mansion =

Historic house in New York, United States

- U.S. National Register of Historic Places
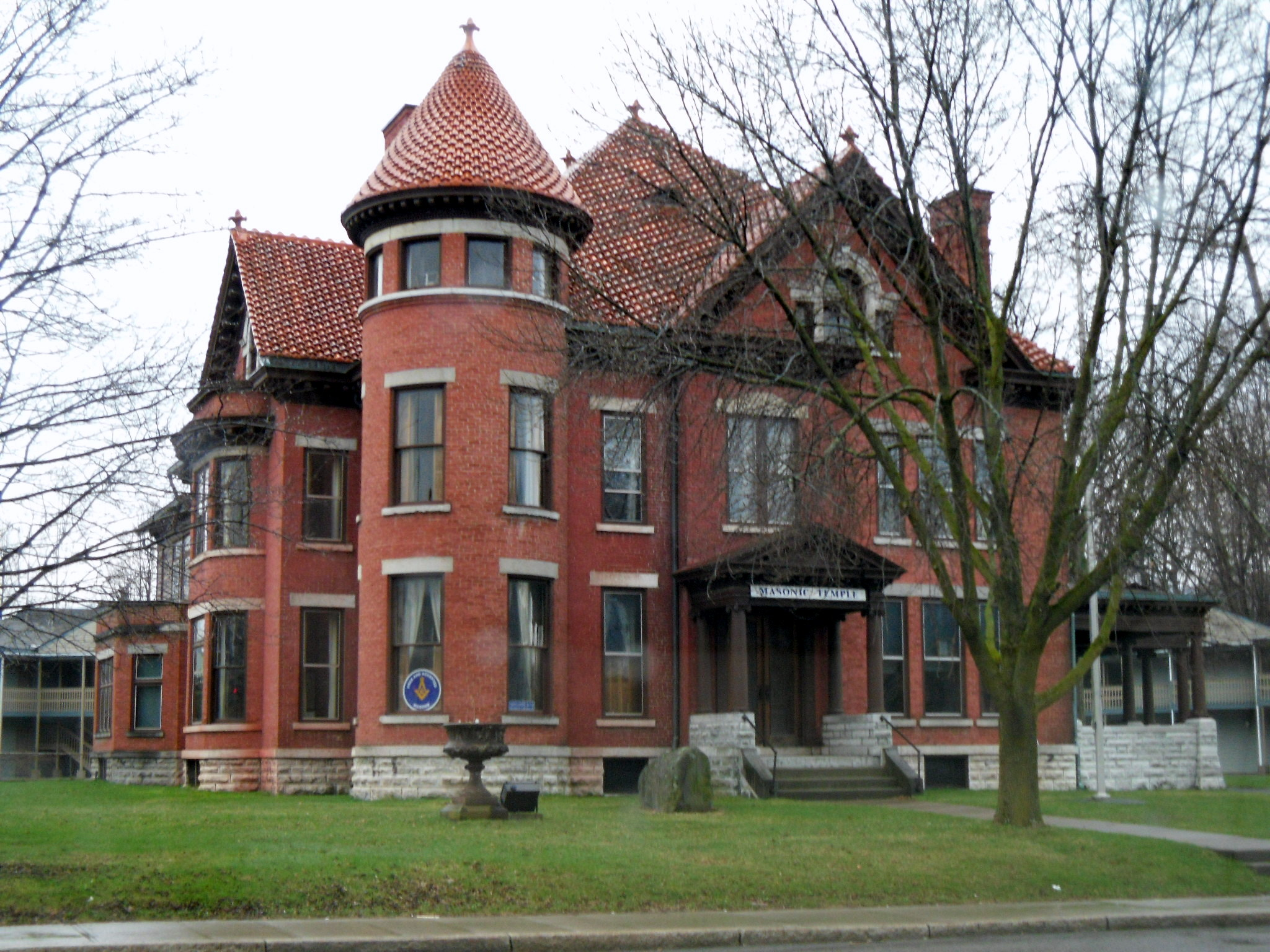
- Fairchild Mansion, April 2010

- Location within New York Location within the United States
- Location: 318 Main St., Oneonta, New York
- Coordinates: 42°27′21″N 75°3′34″W
- Area: 1.5 acres (0.61 ha)
- Built: 1867
- Architectural style: Queen Anne
- NRHP reference No.: 74001294
- Added to NRHP: February 12, 1974

Fairchild Mansion is a historic home located at Oneonta in Otsego County, New York. It is a three-story brick building with a turret, gables, a pedimented entrance porch and a porte cochere in the Queen Anne style. The original house was built in 1867 and subsequently expanded and modernized in 1897 and 1915 by its owner, George W. Fairchild (1845–1924). It features a roof of Conosera tiles produced by the Celadon Terra Cotta Company. The home was taken over by Oneonta Masonic Lodge in 1929.

It was listed on the National Register of Historic Places in 1974. It is located within the Oneonta Downtown Historic District established in 2003.
