= Springbrook (organization) =

Springbrook is a not-for-profit organization located in Oneonta, New York. Initially, Springbrook was opened as an orphanage in 1925 by Harriet Parish Smith and was known as the Upstate Baptist Home for Children. The home was established on a working 95-acre farm and also provided its young residents with an education.

== History ==
In 1941, the Upstate Home was incorporated as a not-for-profit organization and would continue as a school and home for orphans until 1966, when its mission changed and it became a home which would provide residential and educational services to children with developmental disabilities. The following year (1967), the Upstate Home became certified as a school and, in 1974, the first community residence for adults with developmental disabilities opened in Oneonta, New York. As of 2013, it is home to nine residents with special needs.

In 1992, the organization opened its integrated (serving children with a without special needs) Kids Unlimited Preschool. In 1994, the Upstate Home began providing Day-Hablitation services for disabled adults and currently offers a variety of educational, occupational, and recreational supports for over 65 individuals.

In 2006, the Upstate Baptist Home for Children changed its name to Springbrook in order to better reflect the services it provides. In 2012, the organization saw another major change as it purchased the building formerly home to the Saint Mary's School in Oneonta, New York. This facility allowed the agency to centralize much of its operations and administration and would become the home of the Day-Habilitation program—all of which had previously been located on the Main Campus and throughout the surrounding area.

Another major change that occurred that year was the development of the Tom Golisano Center for Autism. The Golisano Program is a residential school program for children whose primary diagnosis is autism spectrum disorder.

== Services ==
The organization is the leader in innovative supports for disabled adults and children and includes a variety of services, such as Consolidated Supports and Services, Medicaid Service Coordination, and Home and Community Based Waivers. Springbrook's programs include an integrated preschool, a residential school, adult community homes, site-based and community-based rehabilitation, respite, and recreational programs. All of these programs and services are conducted within the guidelines and regulations provided by the New York State Office for People with Developmental Disabilities (OPWDD).

Since the first community home for adults with developmental disabilities opened in 1974, there have been twenty-three others opened, distributed throughout Delaware, Otsego, Chenango, and Madison counties. Springbrook's community homes provide care and services for over 150 residents.

As of 2013, Springbrook is the third largest employer in Otsego County and provides services and supports to over 850 adults and children with developmental disabilities.
