= Oneonta Downtown Historic District =

United States historic place

- U.S. National Register of Historic Places
- U.S. Historic district
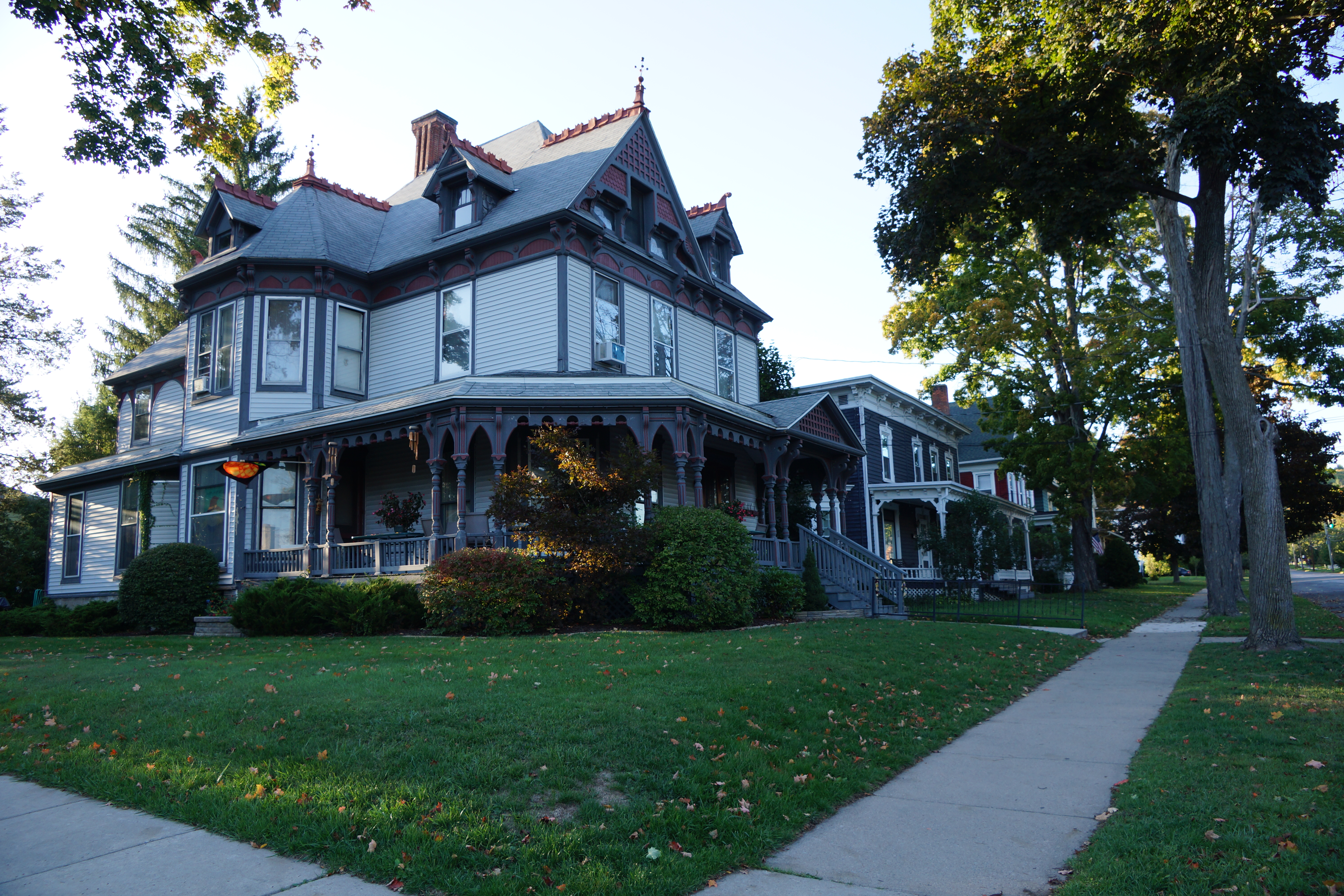

- Location within New York Location within the United States
- Location: Main, Chestnut, Dietz, Market, Elm, Water, Wall, S. Main Sts., Oneonta, New York
- Coordinates: 42°27′15″N 75°3′44″W
- Area: 31 acres (13 ha)
- Architectural style: Greek Revival, Italianate
- NRHP reference No.: 03001245
- Added to NRHP: December 4, 2003

Oneonta Downtown Historic District is a national historic district located at Oneonta in Otsego County, New York. It encompasses 64 contributing buildings and one contributing site. It encompasses the city's intact commercial and civic core and includes commercial buildings, six churches, the city's historic civil buildings, a few industrial buildings, and a small park. The district includes several separately listed buildings: the Masonic Temple, Old Post Office, Municipal Building, Ford Block, and Oneonta Theatre.

It was listed on the National Register of Historic Places in 2003.
