= Walnut Street Historic District (Oneonta, New York) =

Historic district in New York, United States

- U.S. National Register of Historic Places
- U.S. Historic district
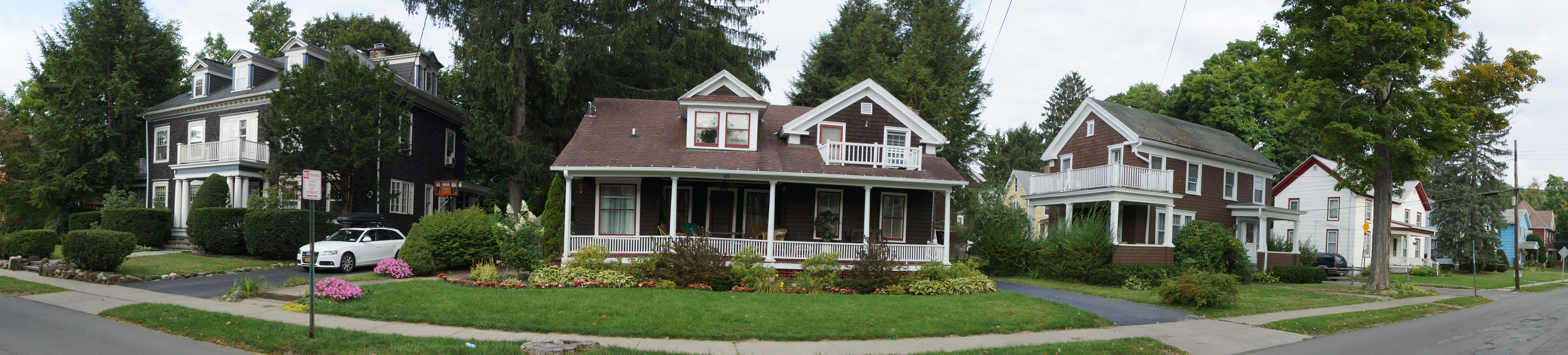

- Location within New York Location within the United States
- Location: Ford Ave., Walnut, Dietz, Elm and Maple Sts., Oneonta, New York
- Coordinates: 42°27′25″N 75°3′42″W
- Area: 13 acres (5.3 ha)
- Architectural style: Classical Revival, Greek Revival, Late Victorian
- NRHP reference No.: 80002745
- Added to NRHP: July 30, 1980

The Walnut Street Historic District is a historic district in Oneonta, New York, USA. The district includes 44 structures located on: Dietz Street, Elm Street, Ford Avenue, Maple Street, and Walnut Street. Changes in rental regulations by the city government concern those involved with the preservation of the historic district.

It was listed on the National Register of Historic Places in 1980.
