= George I. Wilber House =

Historic house in New York, United States

- U.S. National Register of Historic Places
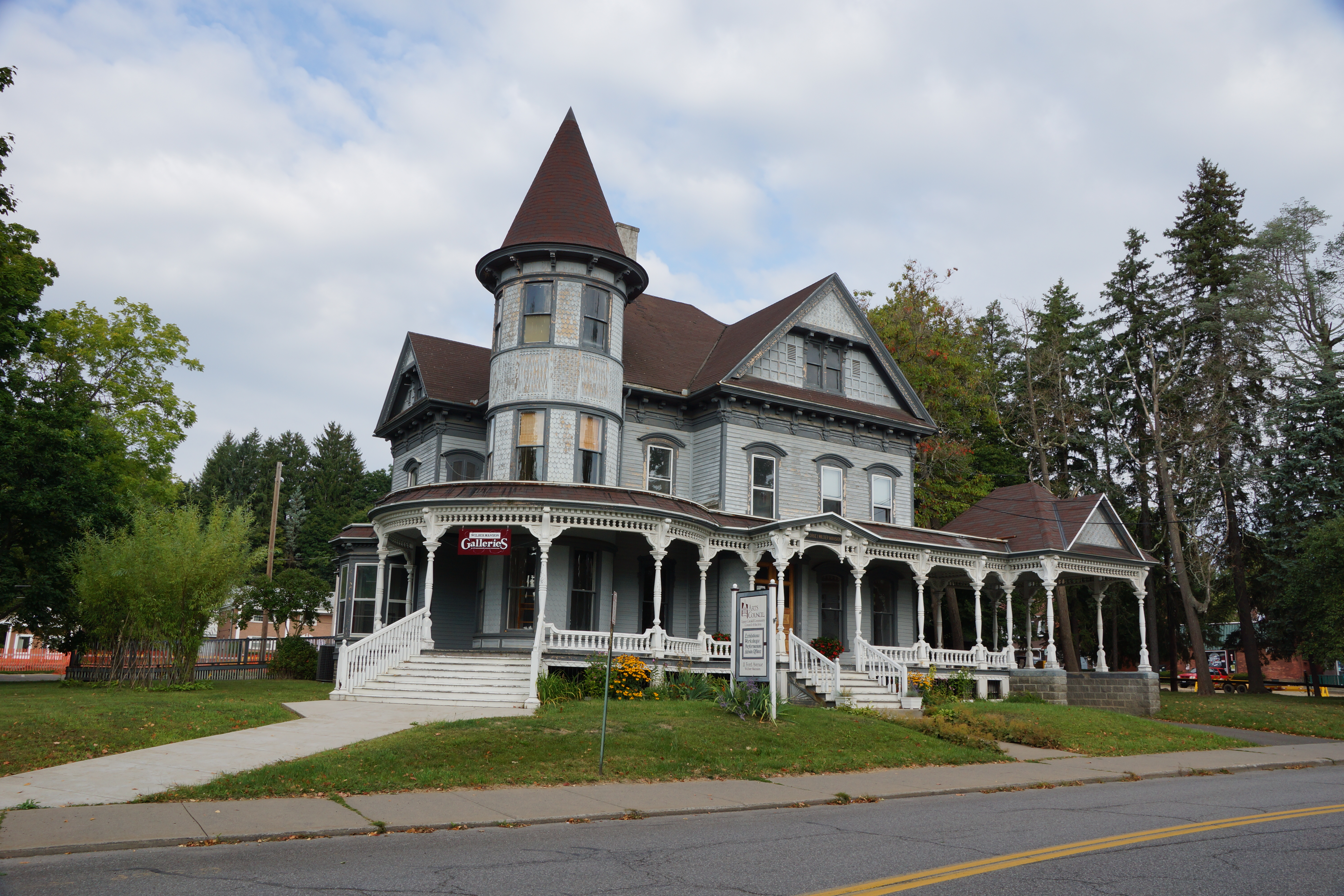
- George I. Wilber House, September 2012

- Location within New York Location within the United States
- Location: 11 Ford Ave., Oneonta, New York
- Coordinates: 42°27′19″N 75°3′43″W
- Area: less than one acre
- Built: 1875
- Architectural style: Queen Anne
- NRHP reference No.: 00001381
- Added to NRHP: November 15, 2000

George I. Wilber House is a historic home located at Oneonta in Otsego County, New York. It was built in two phases, 1875 and about 1890. It is a three-story wood-frame structure on a stone foundation in the Queen Anne style. It features a three-story, round corner tower, cross gabled roof, and a large, very decorative wrap-around porch with a porte-cochere. In 1997 it became home to the Upper Catskill Community Council of the Arts.

It was listed on the National Register of Historic Places in 2000.
