= Oneonta Theatre =

- U.S. National Register of Historic Places
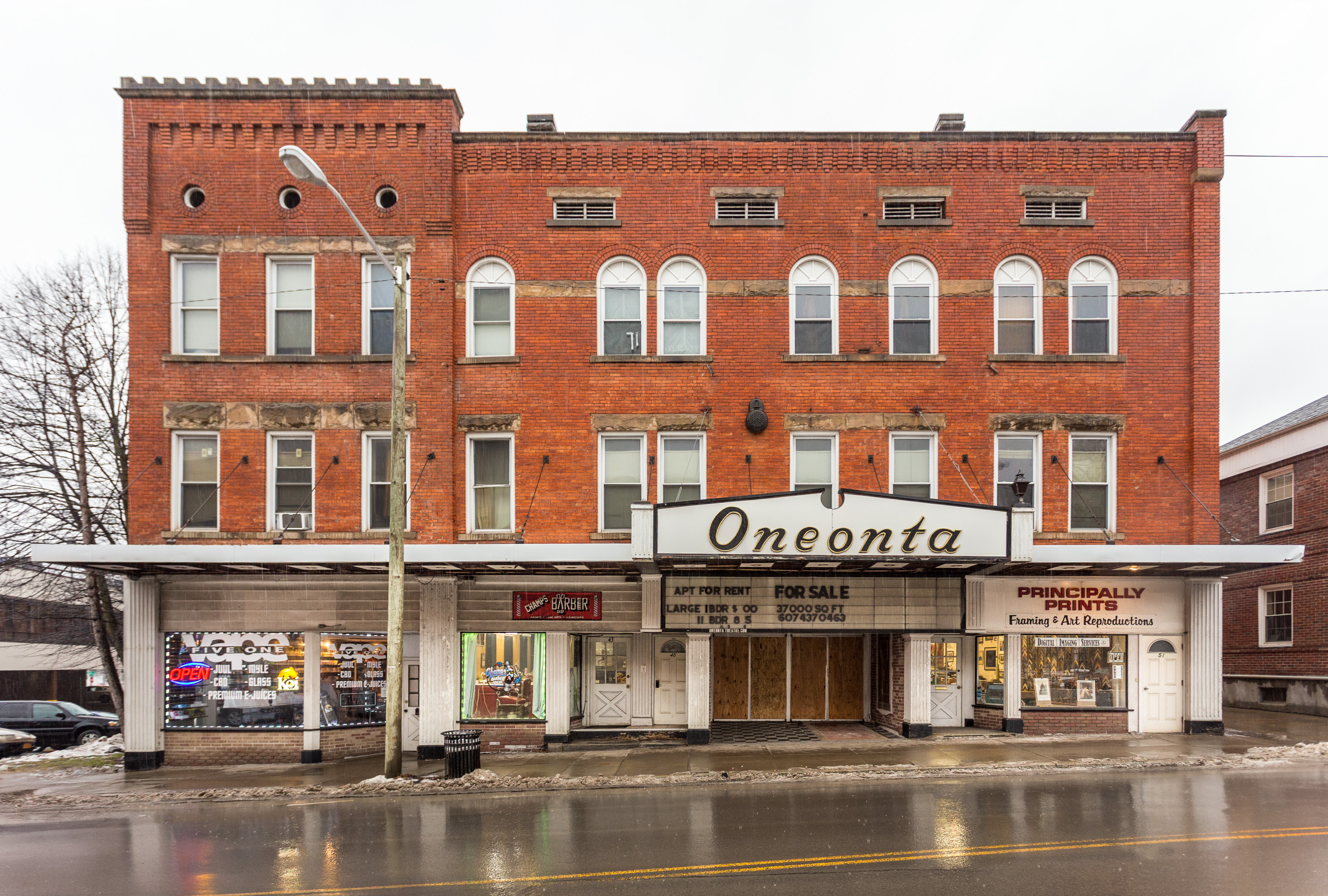
- 2020

- Location within New York Location within the United States
- Location: 47 Chestnut St., Oneonta, New York
- Coordinates: 42°27′12″N 75°3′50″W
- Area: less than one acre
- Built: 1897
- NRHP reference No.: 02000555
- Added to NRHP: May 22, 2002

Oneonta Theatre is a historic theatre building located at Oneonta in Otsego County, New York. The original structure was built about 1897 and expanded in several stages. The original three story structure was a generally rectangular block with storefronts and theater entrance on the first floor and apartments above. A theater wing projected from the rear was set at a 45-degree angle. In 1922, the theater was expanded and the entrance relocated to the center of the building. The 1922 marquee was removed in the 1970s.

It was listed on the National Register of Historic Places in 2002. It is located within the Oneonta Downtown Historic District established in 2003.
