= Ford Block =

Historic commercial building in New York, United States

- U.S. National Register of Historic Places
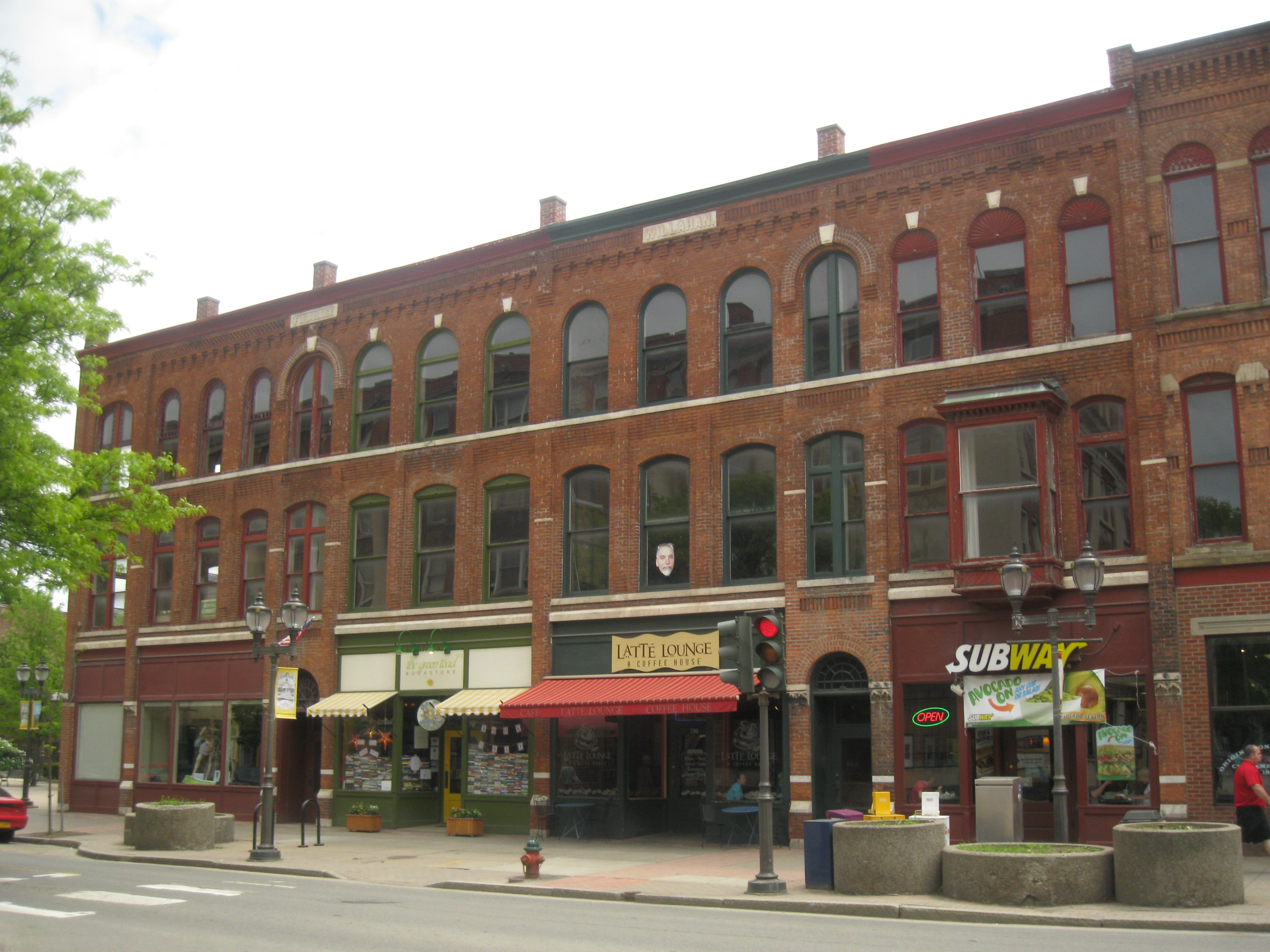
- The Ford Block in 2014

- Location within New York Location within the United States
- Location: 188-202 Main St., Oneonta, New York
- Coordinates: 42°27′14″N 75°3′43″W
- Area: 0.3 acres (0.12 ha)
- Built: 1881
- Architect: Blend, L. H.
- Architectural style: Queen Anne
- NRHP reference No.: 84002893
- Added to NRHP: September 7, 1984

Ford Block is a historic commercial building located at Oneonta in Otsego County, New York. It is a large, three story brick building in a modified Queen Anne style. It was built between 1881 and 1882 and is built of load-bearing brick walls and covered by a flat composition roof. The first floor is a series of storefronts; the second window openings on the second level have segmental arches and those on the third floor round arches. In 1975, it was saved from demolition as part of the urban renewal of Oneonta by a group of local businessmen.

It was listed on the National Register of Historic Places in 1984. It is located within the Oneonta Downtown Historic District established in 2003. f>
