= Bresee Hall =

- U.S. National Register of Historic Places
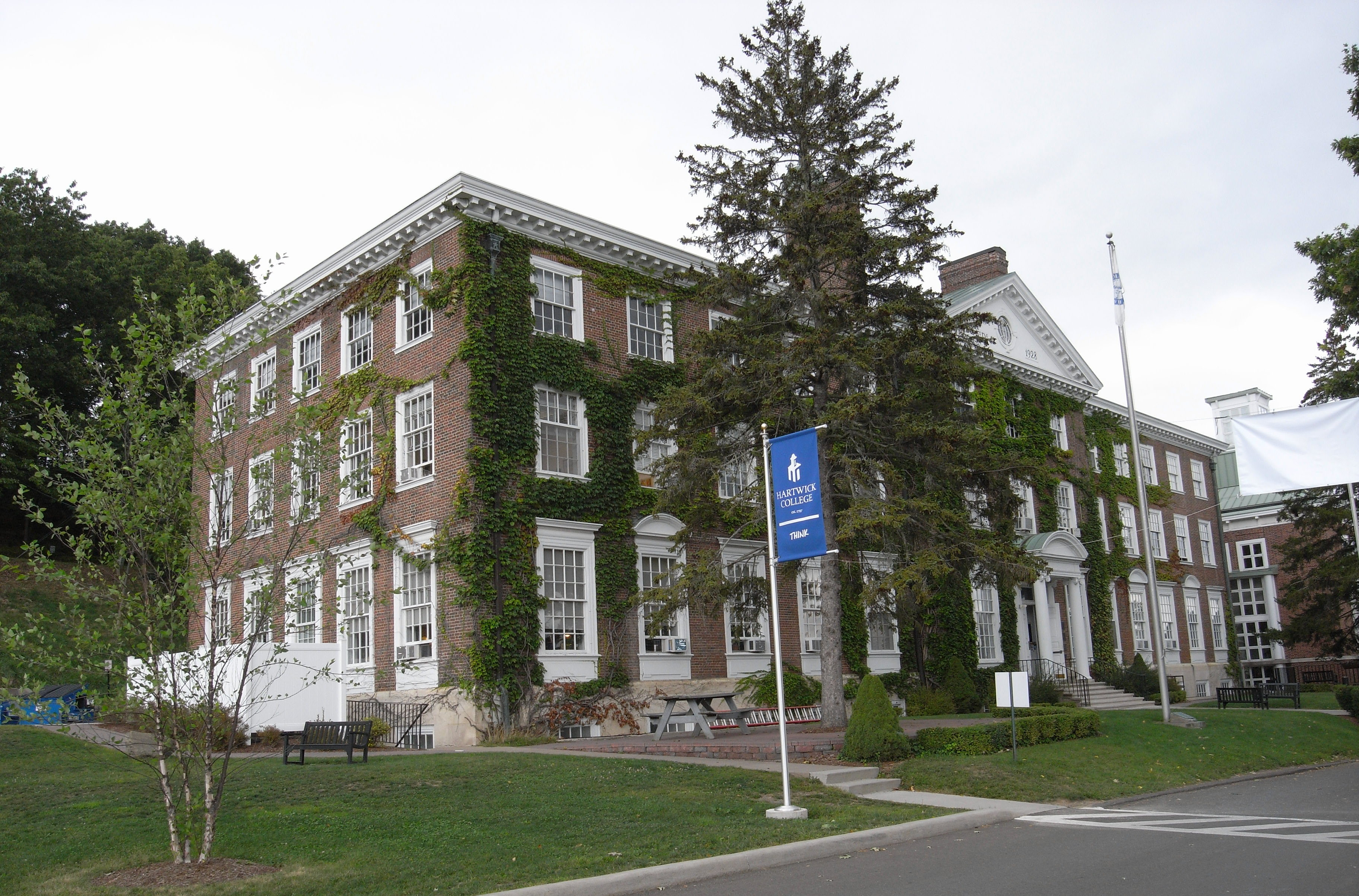
- Bresee Hall, September 2012

- Location within New York Location within the United States
- Interactive map showing the location for Breesee Hall
- Location: Hartwick Dr., Oneonta, New York
- Coordinates: 42°27′31″N 75°4′20″W
- Area: 1 acre (0.40 ha)
- Built: 1928
- Architect: Pope, John Russell & Baum, James; Williamson Co.
- Architectural style: Colonial Revival, Neo-Georgian
- NRHP reference No.: 84002892
- Added to NRHP: April 12, 1984

Bresee Hall is a historic institutional building located on the campus of Hartwick College at Oneonta in Otsego County, New York. It was designed by architect John Russell Pope and built in 1928. It is a rectangular, three story brick building with a symmetrical thirteen bay facade. The east facade features a projecting, pedimented three bay pavilion. The formal entrance is located at the center of the pavilion and consists of a portico composed of flanking pilasters and columns with composite capitals, a broad entablature and a segmental pediment. The building is topped by a hipped roof with a two-stage octagonal wooden cupola topped by a weather vane. The building has Colonial Revival style detailing.

It was listed on the National Register of Historic Places in 2004.
