= Sunnyside (Richfield Springs, New York) =

Historic house in New York, United States

- U.S. National Register of Historic Places
- Location within New York Location within the United States
- Location: 72 E. Main St., Richfield Springs, New York
- Coordinates: 42°51′7″N 74°58′42″W
- Area: 2.9 acres (1.2 ha)
- Built: 1890
- Architect: Williams, John
- Architectural style: Shingle Style
- NRHP reference No.: 88000211
- Added to NRHP: March 10, 1988

Sunnyside, also known as the S.D. Styles Summer Residence, is a historic home located at Richfield Springs in Otsego County, New York. It was built in two stages in 1890 and 1909 and is a dwelling in the Queen Anne style. It is a 2-story frame house with a shingled exterior. The house is composed of a full 2-story, gable-roofed main block with a 1 1/2-story east addition with a hipped roof. Also on the property is a small carriage barn.

It was listed on the National Register of Historic Places in 1988.
