= Morris–Lull Farm =

- U.S. National Register of Historic Places
- U.S. Historic district
- Location within New York Location within the United States
- Nearest city: Morris, New York
- Coordinates: 42°31′24″N 75°14′57″W
- Area: 139.4 acres (56.4 ha)
- Architectural style: Federal
- NRHP reference No.: 05001389
- Added to NRHP: December 7, 2005

Morris–Lull Farm, also known as Elmwood Farm, is a historic farm and national historic district located at Morris in Otsego County, New York. It encompasses two contributing buildings and one contributing site. They are an early 20th-century, two-story T-shaped barn; a privy; and the farm landscape. The farmhouse, known as Elmwood, is a two-story Federal style stone house, five bays wide and two bays deep.

It was listed on the National Register of Historic Places in 2005.
