= Oneonta Armory =

- U.S. National Register of Historic Places
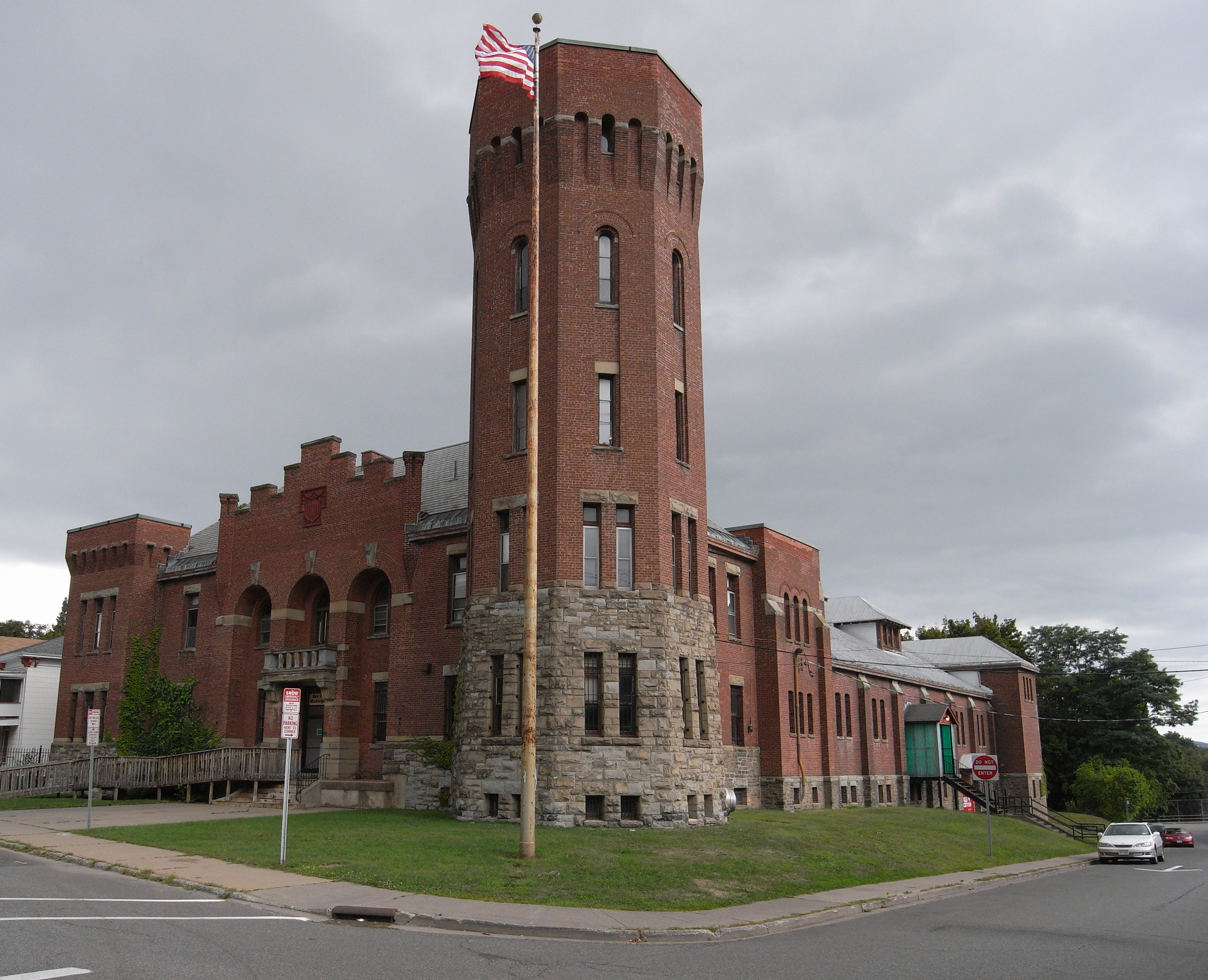
- Oneonta Armory, September 2012

- Location within New York Location within the United States
- Location: 4 Academy St., Oneonta, New York
- Coordinates: 42°27′3″N 75°3′56″W
- Area: 0.5 acres (0.20 ha)
- Built: 1905
- Architect: Heins, George L.
- Architectural style: Late Victorian, castellated
- MPS: Army National Guard Armories in New York State MPS
- NRHP reference No.: 95000078
- Added to NRHP: March 2, 1995

Oneonta Armory is a historic National Guard armory building located at Oneonta in Otsego County, New York, built in 1905 with a brick and stone castle-like structure. It was designed by State architect George L. Heins. It consists of a two-story administration building with an attached drill shed. The building features a 5-story octagonal tower at the southwest corner and a 2 1/2-story square tower at the northwest corner.

It was listed on the National Register of Historic Places in 1995.
