= Municipal Building (Oneonta, New York) =

- U.S. National Register of Historic Places
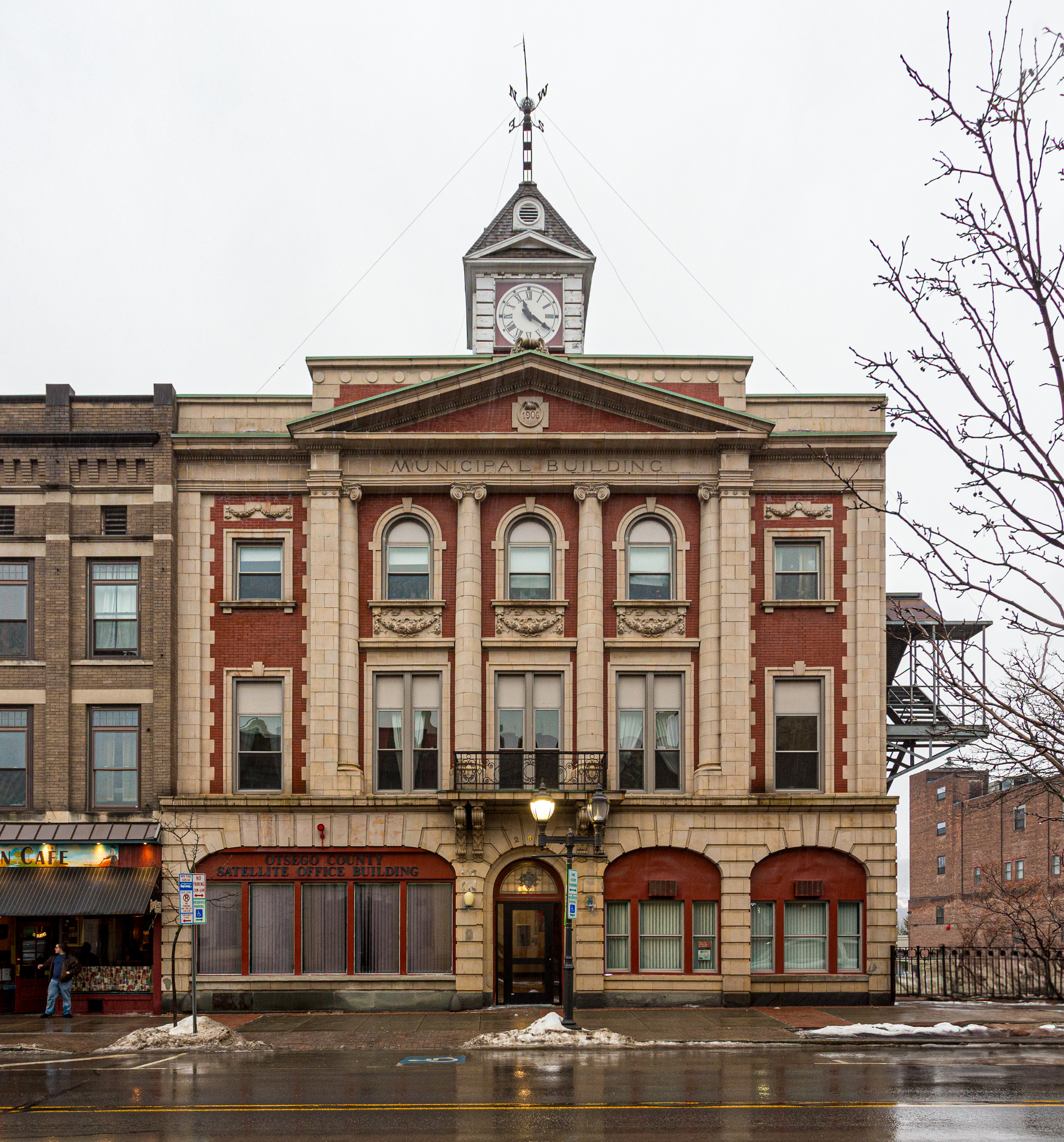
- 2020

- Location within New York Location within the United States
- Interactive map showing the location for Municipal Building Oneonta
- Location: 238-242 Main St., Oneonta, New York
- Coordinates: 42°27′16″N 75°3′41″W
- Area: 0.3 acres (0.12 ha)
- Built: 1906
- Architect: Linn Kinne
- Architectural style: Beaux Arts
- NRHP reference No.: 82001233
- Added to NRHP: October 29, 1982

Municipal Building, also known as Old City Hall, is a historic city hall building located at Oneonta in Otsego County, New York, United States. It is three story masonry building with an ornate facade of painted brick and terra cotta, built in 1906 in the Beaux-Arts style. A central tetrastyle pavilion in the Ionic order dominates the upper floors. In 1978 a neocolonial clock tower was erected on the roof. It housed the municipal government until 1980, when they moved to the Old Post Office building.

It was listed on the National Register of Historic Places in 1982. It is located within the Oneonta Downtown Historic District established in 2003.
