= Fortin Site =

- U.S. National Register of Historic Places
- Nearest city: Oneonta, New York
- NRHP reference No.: 80002743
- Added to NRHP: November 28, 1980

Fortin Site is a prehistoric village site located in Oneonta, New York. It was added to the National Register of Historic Places on November 28, 1980.
