= All Saints Chapel and Morris Family Burial Ground =

Historic place in Otsego County, New York

- U.S. National Register of Historic Places
- Location within New York Location within the United States
- Nearest city: Morris, New York
- Coordinates: 42°30′33″N 75°17′16″W
- Area: 2.3 acres (0.93 ha)
- Built: 1791
- Architect: Keese, G. Pomeroy
- Architectural style: Gothic
- NRHP reference No.: 97001455
- Added to NRHP: November 24, 1997

All Saints Chapel and Morris Family Burial Ground is a historic Episcopal church located at Morris in Otsego County, New York. The church is a small stone Gothic Revival style chapel built from about 1866 to 1868. The rectangular building is three bays wide and four bays deep under a steeply sloping gable roof with slate shingles. It features a projecting central bell-cote tower and a large rose window. The first burial in the Morris Family Burial Ground dates to 1791 and it remains an active family burial ground as of 2025. Also on the property is a wagon shed dating to the 1860s.

It was listed on the National Register of Historic Places in 1997.
