= Old Post Office (Oneonta, New York) =

- U.S. National Register of Historic Places
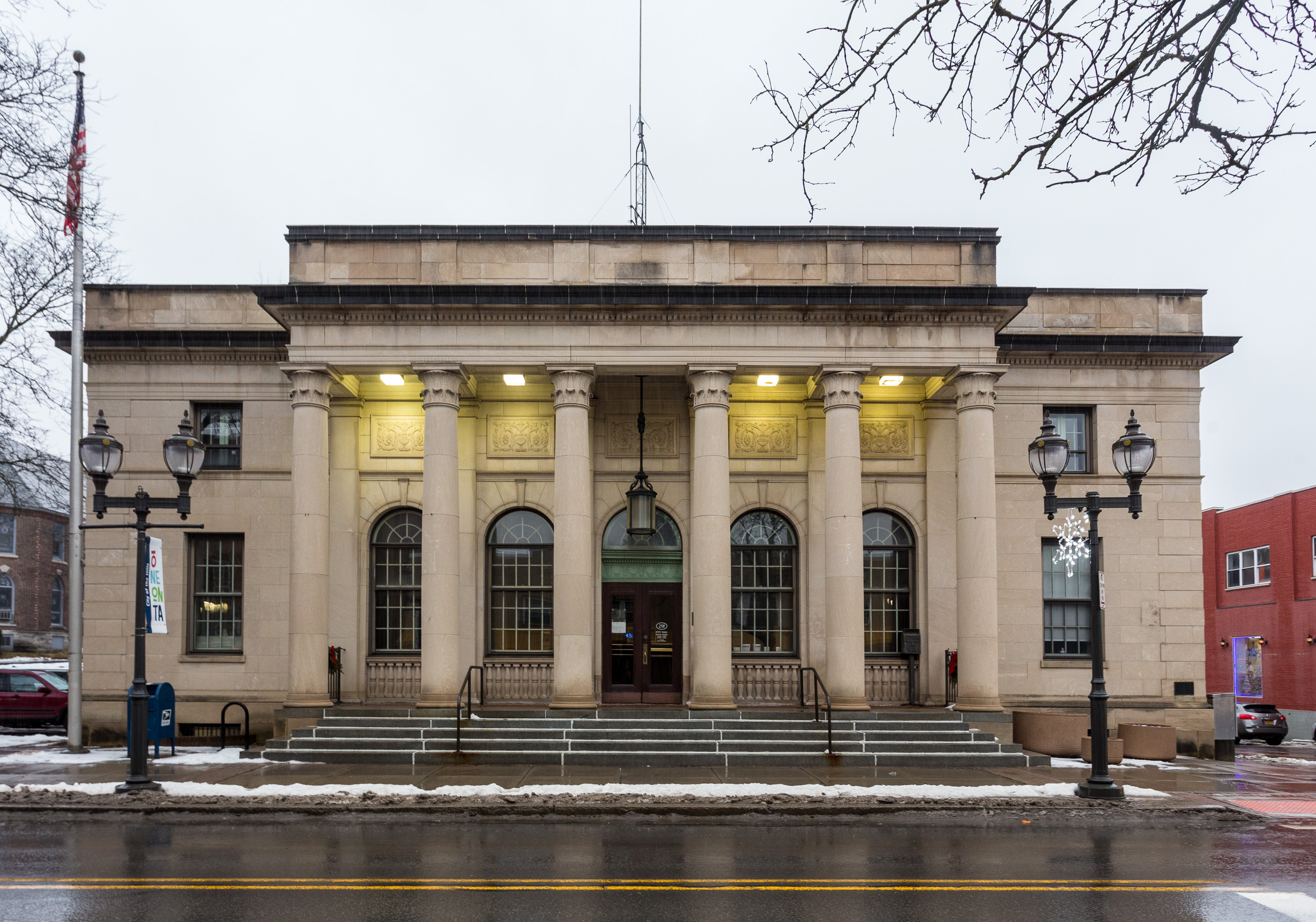
- 2020

- Location within New York Location within the United States
- Location: Main St., Oneonta, New York
- Coordinates: 42°27′17″N 75°3′38″W
- Area: 0.5 acres (0.20 ha)
- Built: 1915
- Architect: Wenderoth, Oscar
- Architectural style: Classical Revival
- NRHP reference No.: 78001895
- Added to NRHP: November 17, 1978

Old Post Office is a historic post office building located at Oneonta in Otsego County, New York, United States. It was built in 1915, and is one of a number of post offices in New York State designed by the Office of the Supervising Architect of the Treasury Department, Oscar Wenderoth. The original portion of the building is nearly square, seven bays on each side. It is built of Indiana limestone, with Concord granite trim in the Classical Revival style. It features a giant portico supported by six massive Corinthian order columns. In 1980, the building housed city offices moved from the Old City Hall.

It was listed on the National Register of Historic Places in 1988. It is located within the Oneonta Downtown Historic District established in 2003.
