= Chapin Memorial Church =

Historic church in New York, United States

- U.S. National Register of Historic Places
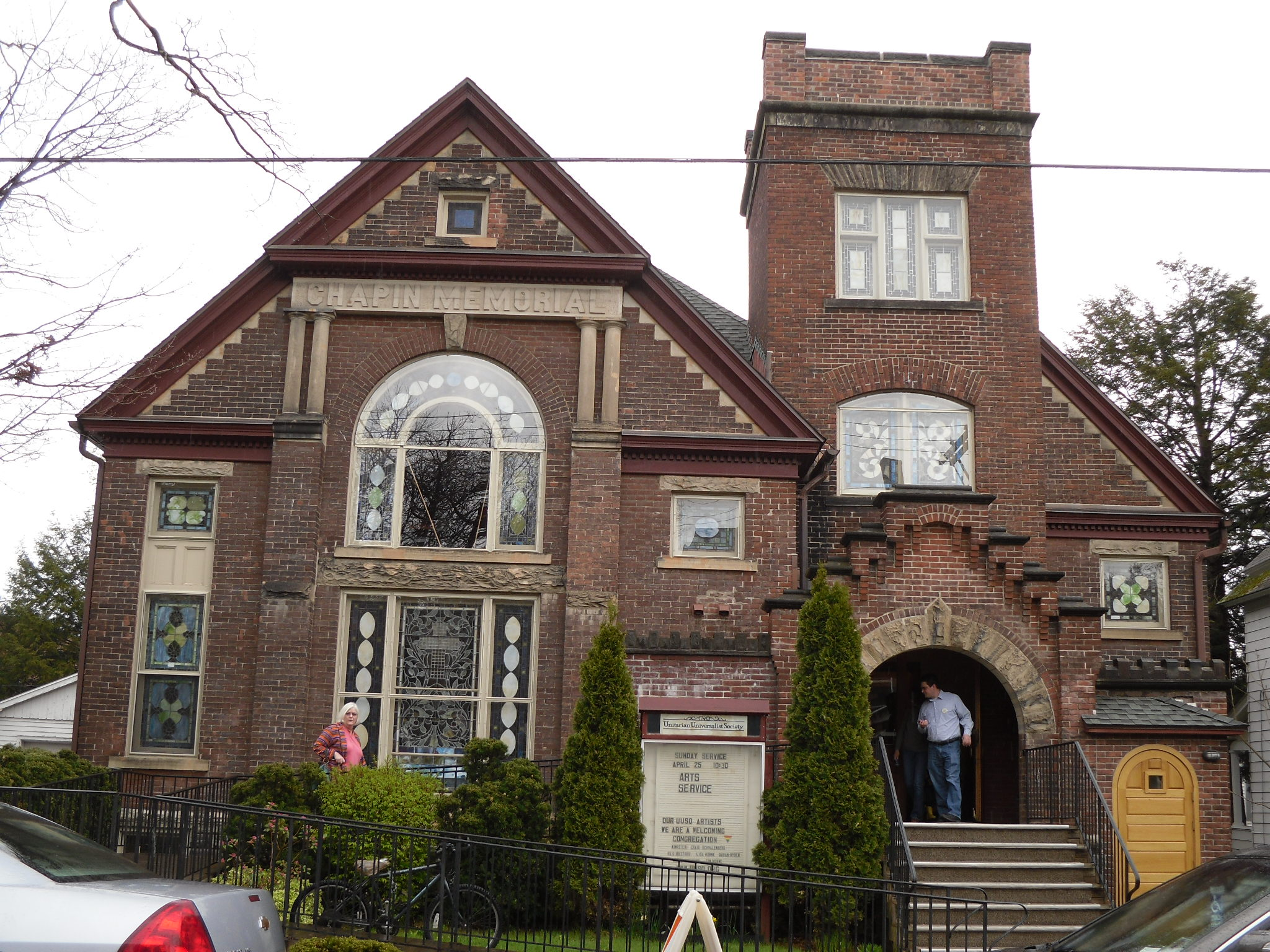
- Chapin Memorial Church, April 2010

- Location within New York Location within the United States
- Location: 12 Ford Ave., Oneonta, New York
- Coordinates: 42°42′24″N 74°58′36″W
- Area: less than one acre
- Built: 1894
- Architect: Blend, L.H.; Taylor, F.K.
- Architectural style: Late Victorian
- NRHP reference No.: 02001049
- Added to NRHP: September 12, 2002

Chapin Memorial Church is a historic Universalist church at 12 Ford Avenue in Oneonta, Otsego County, New York. It was built in 1894 and is a one and a half-story brick building on a tall, cut stone foundation. The facade consists of two parts: the main body of the church and the engaged three stage tower and entrance bay. It is characterized by an eclectic design that combines features characteristic of the Romanesque, Gothic Revival, and Queen Anne styles.

It was listed on the National Register of Historic Places in 2002.
