= Roswell Wright House =

Historic house in New York, United States

- U.S. National Register of Historic Places
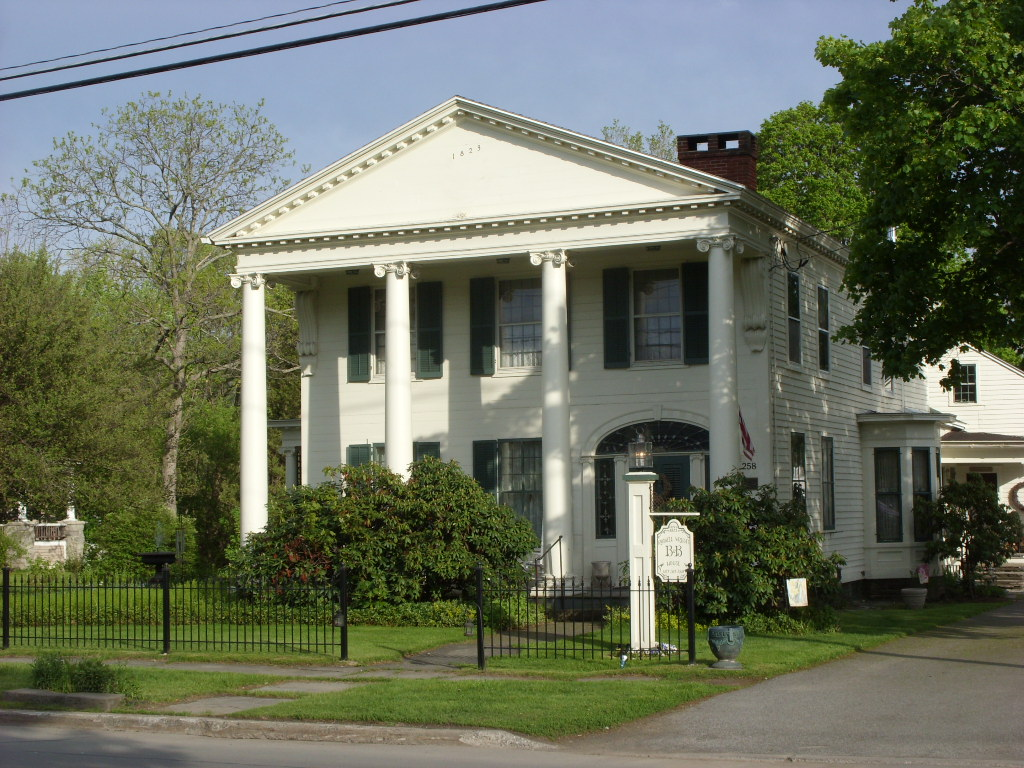
- Roswell Wright House, May 2009

- Location within New York Location within the United States
- Location: 25 Main St., Unadilla, New York
- Coordinates: 42°19′32″N 75°18′38″W
- Area: 0.8 acres (0.32 ha)
- Built: 1823
- Architect: Finch, David
- Architectural style: Early Republic, Early Classical Revival
- NRHP reference No.: 88001271
- Added to NRHP: September 1, 1988

Roswell Wright House is a historic home located at Unadilla in Otsego County, New York, United States. It was built originally in 1823 and is a dwelling in the Greek Revival style. It is a two-story, timber frame, rectangular, temple-front dwelling with a series of later additions off the rear. The front features a portico supported by four wood columns with Ionic order capitals.

It was listed on the National Register of Historic Places in 1988.
