= Unadilla Village Historic District =

Historic district in New York, United States

- U.S. National Register of Historic Places
- U.S. Historic district
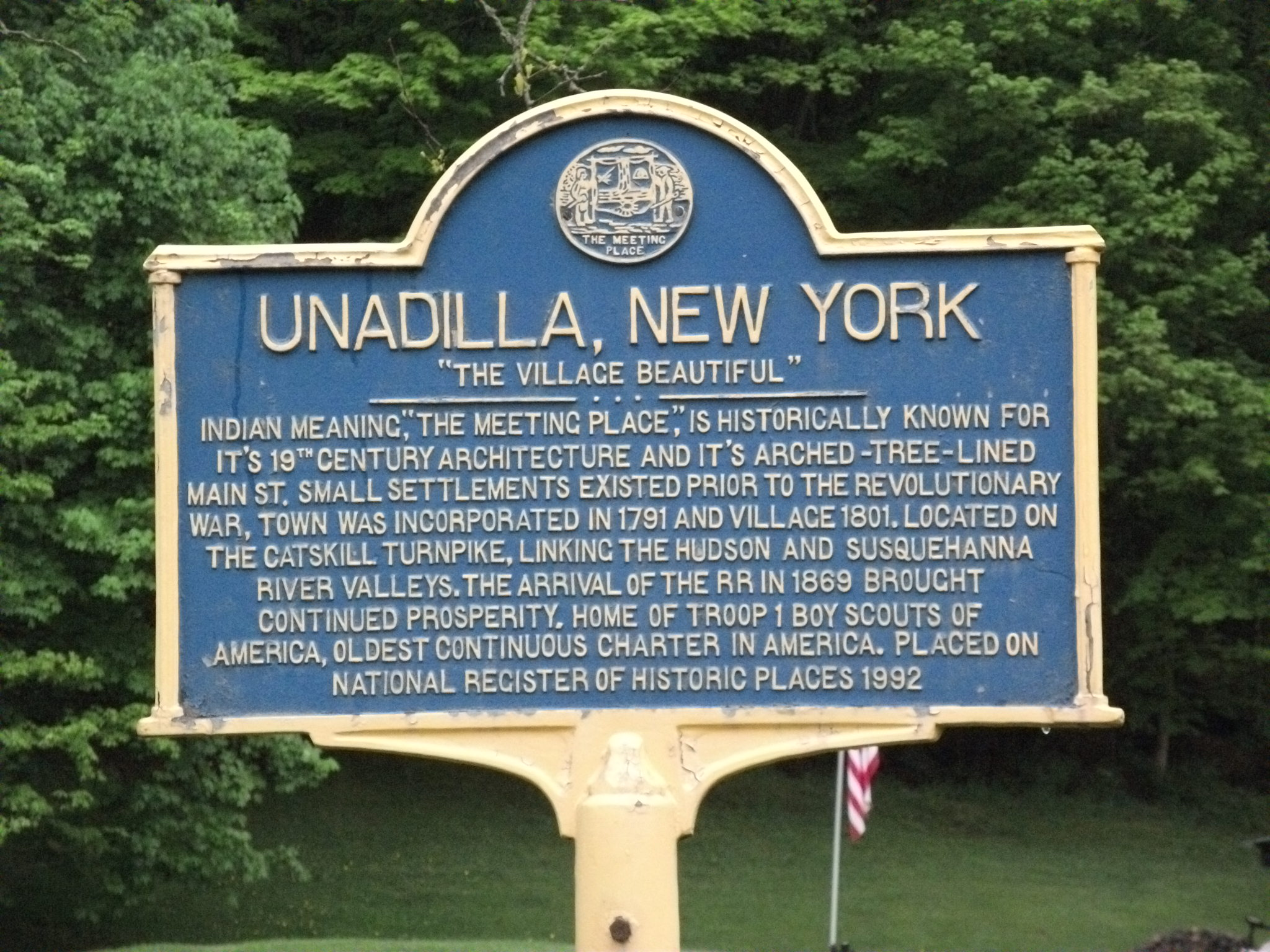
- Unadilla Historic Marker, May 2011

- Location within New York Location within the United States
- Location: Roughly, Main St. from Hopkins St. to Butternut Rd. and Bridge St. from Main to Watson St., Unadilla, New York
- Coordinates: 42°19′24″N 75°18′32″W
- Area: 71 acres (29 ha)
- Architectural style: Mid 19th Century Revival, Late Victorian, Federal
- MPS: Unadilla Village MPS
- NRHP reference No.: 92001079
- Added to NRHP: September 4, 1992

Unadilla Village Historic District is a national historic district located at Unadilla in Otsego County, New York. It encompasses 145 contributing buildings, two contributing sites, one contributing structure, and three contributing objects. the majority of the buildings are residential (79, with 41 contributing dependencies), with four churches, 11 commercial buildings, six institutional and/or public buildings, one historic cemetery, three monuments, and a limestone railroad underpass.

It was listed on the National Register of Historic Places in 1992.
