= Stonehouse Farm =

Historic house in New York, United States

- U.S. National Register of Historic Places
- Location within New York Location within the United States
- Location: E of Oneonta on NY 7, Oneonta, New York
- Coordinates: 42°28′14″N 75°0′8″W
- Area: 11 acres (4.5 ha)
- Built: 1820
- Architectural style: Federal
- NRHP reference No.: 80002744
- Added to NRHP: November 19, 1980

Stonehouse Farm is a historic home located at Oneonta in Otsego County, New York. It was built in 1820 in the Federal style. It is a 2 1/2-story cross-gable stone house, with 1 1/2-story flanking wings set back from the front elevation. It features a wooden portico supported by two clusters of three Doric order columns built about 1950.

It was listed on the National Register of Historic Places in 1980.
