= Oneonta, New York =

- City
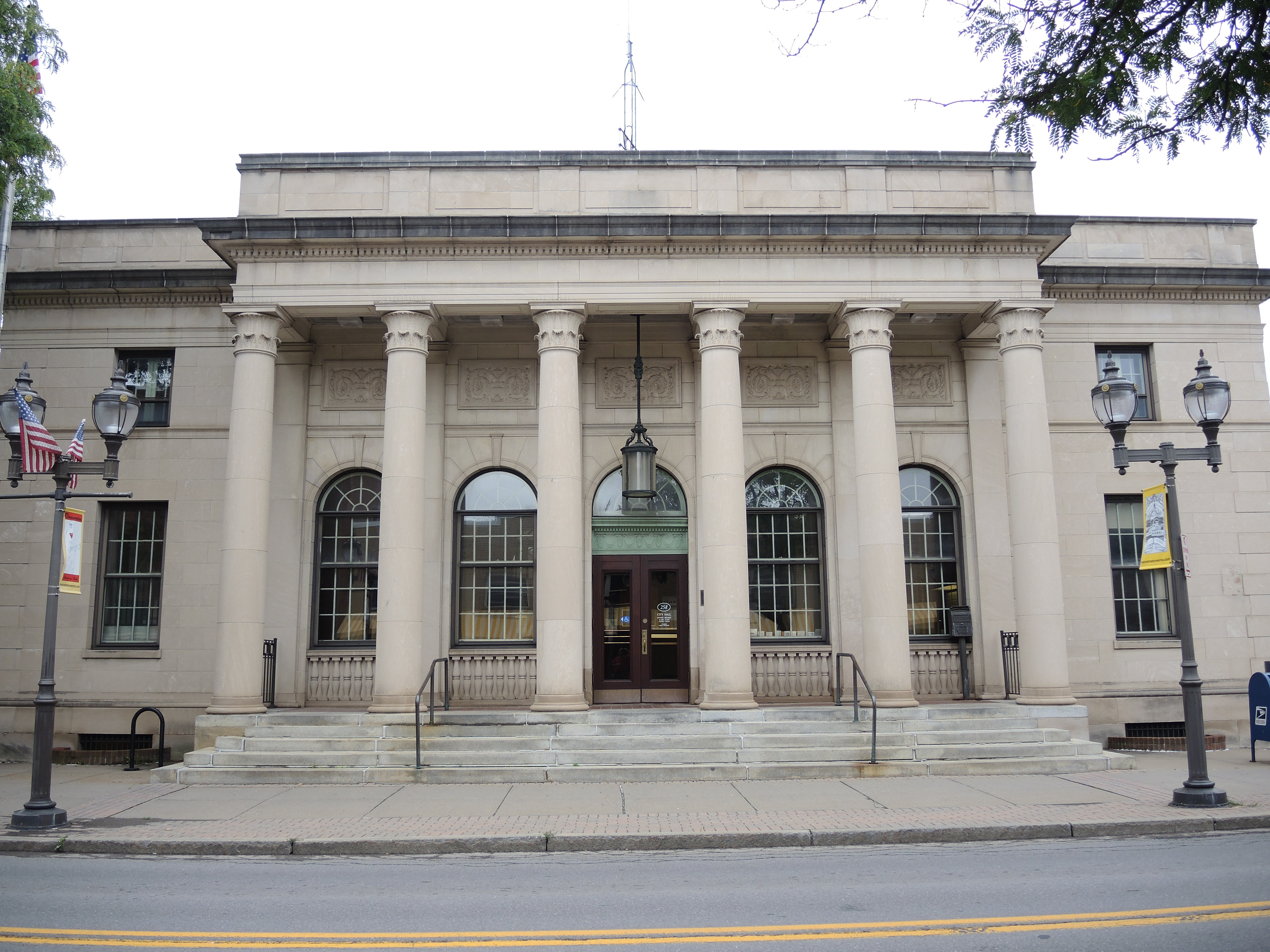
- City Hall (formerly the post office)

- Flag Seal Logo
- Nickname: "City of the Hills"
- Motto: "We're onta something."
- Location of Oneonta in New York Location of Oneonta in the United States
- Coordinates: 42°27′21″N 75°3′44″W
- Country: United States
- State: New York
- County: Otsego
- Region: Appalachian Region
- Incorporated (village): 1842
- Incorporated (city): 1908

Government
  - Type: Mayor-Council
  - Mayor: Dan Buttermann (D)
  - Common Council: Members' List: • W1: Luke Murphy; • W2: Mark Davies; • W3: David Rissberger; • W4: Kaytee Lipari Shue; • W5: Len Carson; • W6: Scott Harrington; • W7: John Rafter; • W8: Emily Falco

Area
  - Total: 4.37 sq mi (11.31 km^{2})
  - Land: 4.36 sq mi (11.30 km^{2})
  - Water: 0.0039 sq mi (0.01 km^{2})

Population (2020)
  - Total: 13,079
  - Density: 2,998.9/sq mi (1,157.88/km^{2})
- ZIP codes: 13820
- Area code: 607
- FIPS code: 36-54881
- Website: www.oneonta.ny.us

Oneonta (/ˌoʊniˈɒntə/ OH-nee-ON-tə) is a city in southern Otsego County, New York, United States. It is one of the northernmost cities of Appalachia. Oneonta is home to the State University of New York at Oneonta and Hartwick College. SUNY Oneonta began as a normal school and a teacher's college in 1889, and Hartwick College moved into the city in 1928. The approximately 5,800 students from SUNY Oneonta and the approximately 1,500 students at Hartwick make up a significant percentage of the population of Oneonta. As of the 2020 census, Oneonta had a population of 13,079.

While the word "oneonta" is of undetermined origin, it is popularly believed to mean "place of open rocks" in the Mohawk language. This refers to a prominent geological formation known as "Table Rock" at the western end of the city. Oneonta's nickname is "City of the Hills".

The city is surrounded by the town of Oneonta, a separate municipal and political jurisdiction. Oneonta Municipal Airport (N66) is north of the city.

== History ==
Indigenous ancestors of Algonquin and Iroquoian-speaking Native Americans inhabited the land in the territory of Oneonta before European colonists settled in the area. The Five Nations of the Haudenosaunee Confederacy are believed to have emerged and gained dominance prior to the 15th century; they were in place at the time of early French and Dutch colonization.

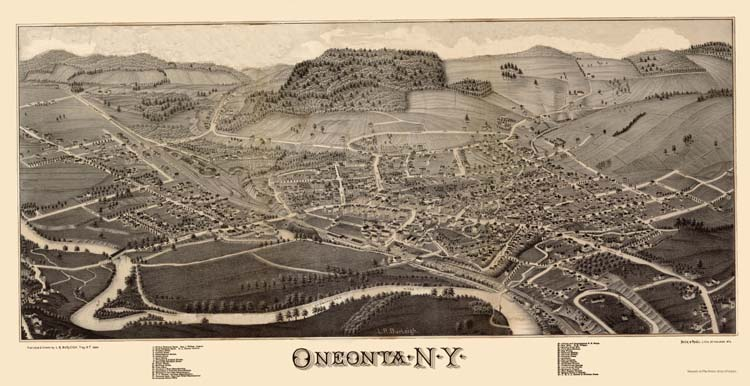
Panoramic map of Oneonta, 1884

The area's early European-American settlers did not arrive until around 1775 and consisted mainly of ethnic Palatine German and Dutch settlers moving out of the Hudson and eastern Mohawk valleys. The first such settler in the area now known as the Town of Oneonta was Henry Scramling (b. ~1743; d. 1808). He had secured a grant of 1,000 acres in the Susquehanna Valley, moved from German Flatts and settled about 1773 in the Oneonta Plains near the mouth of the Otego Creek. He left during the Revolution and returned after the conflict with his brothers, George and David Scramling, and his brothers-in-law, John and David Young. Their farms were not far from the mouth of the Otego Creek. The army led by General James Clinton passed through the area in order to join the Sullivan Expedition in 1779 against Haudenosaunee settlements.

The first hamlet developed around 1800 and was later known as "Milfordville". In 1830, the Town of Oneonta was formed from parts of two other Towns in the county. Milfordville changed its name to Oneonta in 1832. In 1848, it was incorporated as a village within the Town.

Edgar Luderne Welch's Oneonta Historical Souvenir, 1896

In the mid-19th century, the Albany & Susquehanna Railroad reached Oneonta, and soon after was leased in perpetuity to the Delaware & Hudson Canal Company. The arrival of the railroad stimulated development as a railroad center and attracting new industries. Oneonta was once home to the largest locomotive roundhouse in the world.

The earliest known account of Oneonta's history was written by Willard Vincent Huntington. Published in 1891, Oneonta Memories and Sundry Personal Recollections of the Author is, as the title suggests, a combination memoir and history of Oneonta's early formation, its geography, economic fortunes, and social life. In 1896, Edgar Luderne Welch's Oneonta Historical Souvenir was published covering the new normal school and other institutions in the community. Dudley M. Campbell wrote and published History of Oneonta in 1906. This book is a straightforward historical account of the area which concerns itself with politics, economics, and notable events and figures.

The village incorporated as a city in 1908. In February 1991 Mayor David Brenner of Oneonta, New York, and Mayor Danny Hicks of Oneonta, Alabama, officially recognized their cities as sister cities at a centennial celebration for the Alabama city.

== Geography ==
Oneonta is located at 42°27′21″N 75°3′44″W (42.456003, -75.062302). According to the United States Census Bureau, the city has a total area of 4.4 square miles (11 km^{2}), all land.

The city lies between Binghamton and Albany.

The Susquehanna River flows westward past the south part of the city.

Interstate 88 follows the course of the Susquehanna River past Oneonta. New York State Route 7, New York State Route 23 and New York State Route 28 pass through the city.

=== Climate ===
Climate data for Emmons, New York (1991–2020 normals)
Month	Jan	Feb	Mar	Apr	May	Jun	Jul	Aug	Sep	Oct	Nov	Dec	Year
Mean daily maximum °C (°F)	30.2 (−1.0)	32.4 (0.2)	40.6 (4.8)	54.6 (12.6)	66.8 (19.3)	74.2 (23.4)	78.4 (25.8)	77.1 (25.1)	70.4 (21.3)	58.2 (14.6)	45.8 (7.7)	35.0 (1.7)	55.3 (12.9)
Daily mean °C (°F)	20.8 (−6.2)	22.4 (−5.3)	29.9 (−1.2)	42.5 (5.8)	54.1 (12.3)	62.4 (16.9)	66.8 (19.3)	65.6 (18.7)	58.7 (14.8)	47.5 (8.6)	36.8 (2.7)	27.1 (−2.7)	44.6 (7.0)
Mean daily minimum °C (°F)	11.4 (−11.4)	12.3 (−10.9)	19.1 (−7.2)	30.4 (−0.9)	41.3 (5.2)	50.6 (10.3)	55.2 (12.9)	54.0 (12.2)	47.0 (8.3)	36.8 (2.7)	27.8 (−2.3)	19.2 (−7.1)	33.8 (1.0)
Average rainfall mm (inches)	3.30 (84)	2.75 (70)	3.50 (89)	3.85 (98)	3.66 (93)	4.66 (118)	4.48 (114)	3.99 (101)	3.78 (96)	3.89 (99)	3.28 (83)	3.61 (92)	44.75 (1,137)

== Architecture ==
The architecture of Oneonta consists of a variety of Victorian and 20th-century commercial and domestic styles, including low-rise commercial buildings. Oneonta currently has very few industrial complexes. Because of its location, Oneonta does not serve as a prime industrial city.

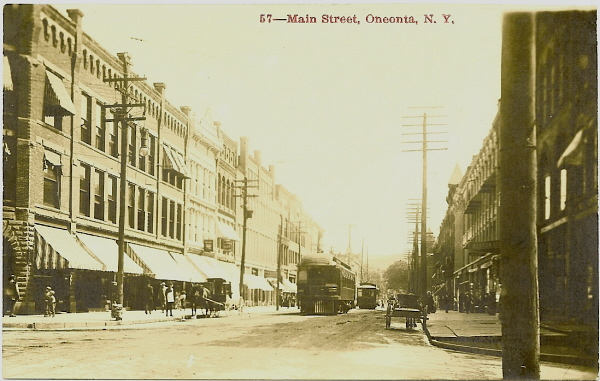
Main Street, c. 1909

There are several historic buildings that were originally homes of prominent people. The Fairchild Mansion was placed on the National Register of Historic Places in 1974 and was formerly the home of George Winthrop Fairchild, one of the original partners with Thomas Watson. Fairchild and Watson were the founders of what eventually became IBM. Also, George I. Wilber House is a historic home located in the city. It was built in two phases, 1875 and about 1890. It is a three-story wood-frame structure on a stone foundation in the Late Victorian style. It features a three-story, round corner tower, cross gabled roof, and a large, very decorative wrap-around porch with a porte-cochere. In 1997 it became home to the Upper Catskill Community Council of the Arts (now the Community Arts Network of Oneonta). It was listed on the National Register of Historic Places in 2000.

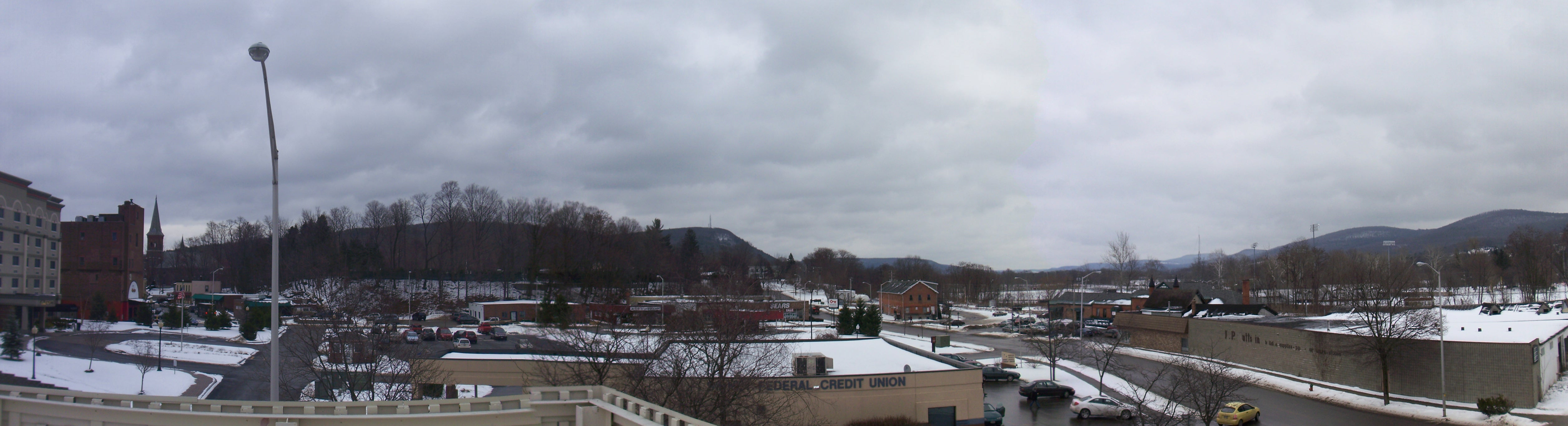
Market Street, January 15, 2010

Also listed on the National Register of Historic Places are Bresee Hall, Chapin Memorial Church, Ford Block, Fortin Site, Municipal Building, Oneonta Armory, Stonehouse Farm, Oneonta Theatre, Old Post Office, Oneonta Downtown Historic District, and Walnut Street Historic District.

The tallest building in Oneonta is Nader Towers. Standing nine stories high, the building is owned by the City of Oneonta Housing Authority and is operated as a senior citizens' housing facility.

== Demographics ==
Historical population
Census	Pop.	Note	%±
1870	1,061		—
1880	3,002		182.9%
1890	6,272		108.9%
1900	7,147		14.0%
1910	9,491		32.8%
1920	11,582		22.0%
1930	12,536		8.2%
1940	11,731		−6.4%
1950	13,564		15.6%
1960	13,412		−1.1%
1970	16,030		19.5%
1980	14,933		−6.8%
1990	13,954		−6.6%
2000	13,292		−4.7%
2010	13,901		4.6%
2020	13,079		−5.9%
U.S. Decennial Census

=== 2020 census ===
As of the 2020 census, Oneonta had a population of 13,079. The median age was 22.8 years. 10.4% of residents were under the age of 18 and 13.0% of residents were 65 years of age or older. For every 100 females there were 80.1 males, and for every 100 females age 18 and over there were 77.3 males age 18 and over.

99.8% of residents lived in urban areas, while 0.2% lived in rural areas.

There were 4,031 households in Oneonta, of which 19.5% had children under the age of 18 living in them. Of all households, 27.4% were married-couple households, 26.3% were households with a male householder and no spouse or partner present, and 36.8% were households with a female householder and no spouse or partner present. About 43.0% of all households were made up of individuals and 14.6% had someone living alone who was 65 years of age or older.

There were 4,880 housing units, of which 17.4% were vacant. The homeowner vacancy rate was 2.4% and the rental vacancy rate was 11.3%.

Racial composition as of the 2020 census
Race	Number	Percent
White	10,767	82.3%
Black or African American	724	5.5%
American Indian and Alaska Native	51	0.4%
Asian	362	2.8%
Native Hawaiian and Other Pacific Islander	5	0.0%
Some other race	378	2.9%
Two or more races	792	6.1%
Hispanic or Latino (of any race)	1,060	8.1%

=== 2000 census ===
As of the census of 2000, there were 13,292 people, 4,253 households, and 1,913 families residing in the city. The population density was 3,032.6 inhabitants per square mile (1,170.9/km^{2}). There were 4,574 housing units at an average density of 403.2 persons per square kilometre (1,044 persons/mi^{2}). The racial makeup of the city was 89.81% White, 4.87% Black, 0.21% Native American, 1.68% Asian, 0.09% Pacific Islander, 0.95% from other races, and 1.69% from two or more races. 3.87% of the population were Hispanic or Latino of any race.

There were 4,253 households, out of which 22.1% had children under the age of 18 living with them, 31.4% were married couples living together, 10.5% have a woman whose husband does not live with her, and 55.0% were non-families. 36.4% of all households were made up of individuals, and 13.5% had someone living alone who was 65 years of age or older. The average household size was 2.20 and the average family size was 2.87.

In the city, the population was spread out, with 13.6% under the age of 18, 43.1% from 18 to 24, 17.6% from 25 to 44, 13.8% from 45 to 64, and 11.8% who were 65 years of age or older. The median age was 23 years. For every 100 females, there were 82.8 males. For every 100 females age 18 and over, there were 80.7 males.

The median income for a household in the city was $24,671, and the median income for a family was $40,833. Males had a median income of $31,250 versus $25,338 for females. The per capita income for the city was $12,640. 30.3% of the population and 13.5% of families were below the poverty line. Out of the total people living in poverty, 20.8% were under the age of 18 and 12.6% were 65 or older.

== Education ==
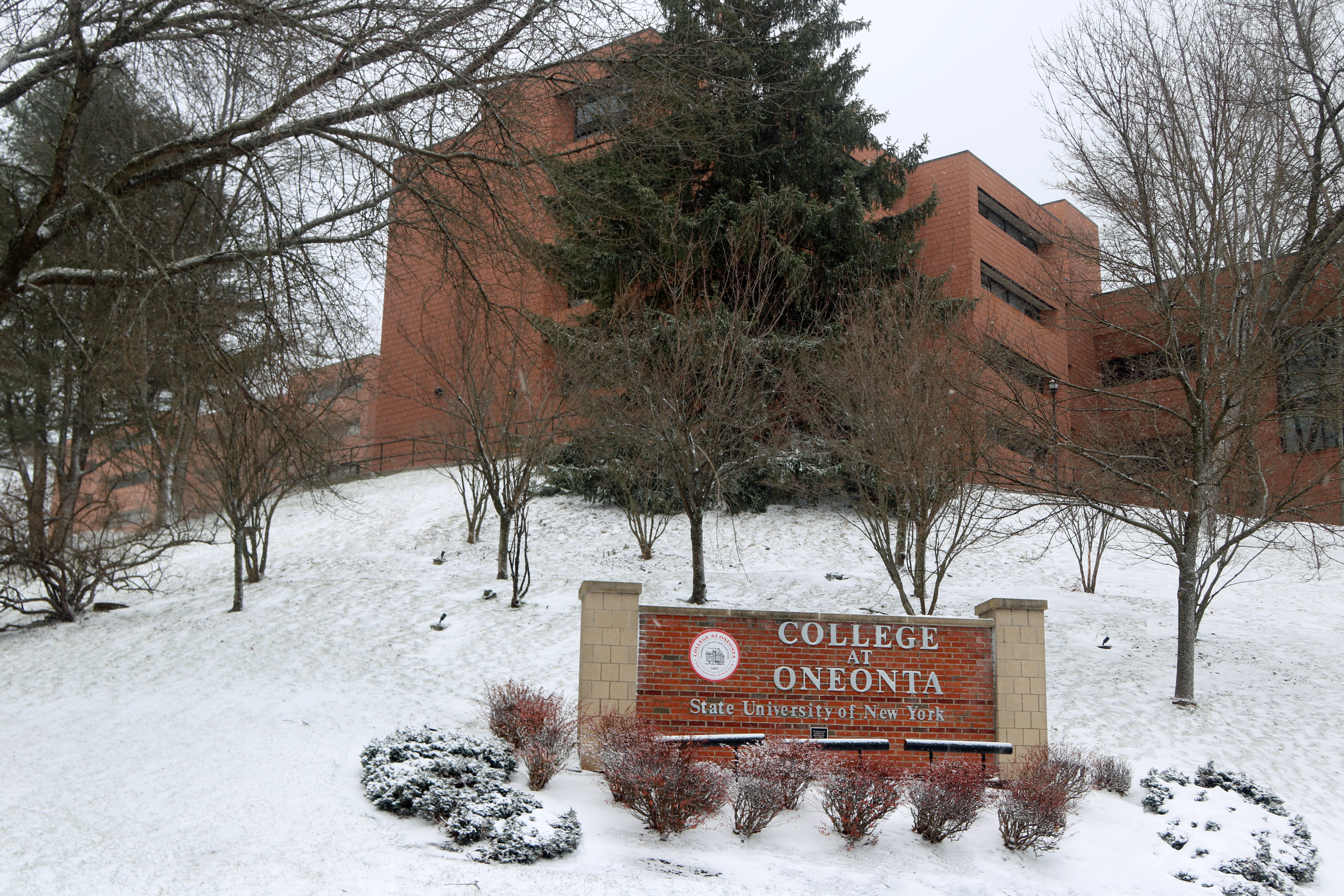
A sign for SUNY Oneonta seen on the main campus in Oneonta, New York

Oneonta is home to the State University of New York at Oneonta and Hartwick College. SUNY Oneonta began as a normal school and a teacher's college in 1889, and Hartwick College moved into the city in 1928. The approximately 5,800 students from SUNY Oneonta and the approximately 1,500 students at Hartwick make up a significant percentage of the population of Oneonta.

Oneonta City School District (OCSD) enrolls students from the communities of the City of Oneonta, the Town of Oneonta, the town of Davenport, the town of Laurens, and the town of Milford. OCSD has one high school, Oneonta High School, which has about 650 students; one middle school, Oneonta Middle School, which has about 300 students; and three elementary schools, Greater Plains, Riverside, and Valleyview, which have a total enrollment of about 900.

A fourth elementary school, Center Street School, was closed in June 2012 due to declining enrollment and decreased funding from New York State.

== Parks and recreation ==
The city of Oneonta operates two major municipal parks, Neahwa Park and Wilber Park. Damaschke Field, home of the Oneonta Outlaws of the Perfect Game Collegiate Baseball League (PGCBL), is located in Neawha Park.

Oneonta has had several professional minor league baseball teams: 1940–1967 Oneonta Red Sox, 1968–1998 Oneonta Yankees (Moved to Staten Island, New York), and 1999-2007 Oneonta Tigers (moved to Norwich, Connecticut). These were all members of the New York–Penn League, a short season Class A league. They all played at Damaschke Field

== Infrastructure ==
Interstate 88 goes through the outskirts of the city. New York State Route 7 and New York State Route 23 pass through the center of the town. Until January 24, 1963, the Delaware & Hudson Railway ran a Binghamton-Albany passenger train through the town.

The City of Oneonta operates bus and paratransit service under the Oneonta Public Transit (OPT) brand. In 2025, bus ridership was 410,779; paratransit ridership was 1,992.

In 2026, Oneonta opened a new transportation hub on where buses from OPT, Otsego Express, and Trailways service now converge.

== Centennial ==
In 2008, the city of Oneonta celebrated its centennial with monthly events throughout the year, beginning with the New Year's Eve parade.

== Notable people ==
- Scott Adams, cartoonist, attended Hartwick College in Oneonta
- Dylan Avery and Korey Rowe, creators of the Loose Change 9/11 conspiracy films, grew up together in Oneonta
- Clay Bellinger, former major league baseball player, born and raised in Oneonta
- Karl Coryat, writer, grew up in Oneonta and nearby Cooperstown
- George Winthrop Fairchild, businessman and IBM chairman, born in Oneonta
- Sherman Mills Fairchild, inventor, born in Oneonta
- Al Gallodoro, musician and Hartwick professor, lived and died in Oneonta
- Anthony P. German, adjutant general of New York, lived in Oneonta
- Herb Greene, architect and artist, born in Oneonta
- Augustus M. Gurney, brigadier general, U.S. Army; born and lived in Oneonta
- Henry E. Huntington, railroad magnate, developer of Beverly Hills, California, born in Oneonta
- Jim Konstanty, baseball pitcher, athletic director at Hartwick College, died in Oneonta
- Mark May, professional football player and sportscaster, born in Oneonta and graduated from Oneonta High School
- Jim Metzler, actor, born in Oneonta
- Erik Neander, GM of the Tampa Bay Rays and 2019 MLB Executive of the Year, graduated from Oneonta High School
- Bill Pullman, actor, received his BA in theater from SUNY Oneonta
- Jason Raize Rothenberg, known professionally as Jason Raize, actor, singer and former Goodwill Ambassador for the United Nations Environment Programme
- Paul Reubens, actor, spent a significant amount of his childhood in Oneonta
- Larry Santos, songwriter, singer and television personality, born in Oneonta
- Achsah M. Skinner, missionary teacher in Chile, born in Oneonta
- Jack Smith, lawyer, received a BA in political science from SUNY Oneonta
- Frances Starr, actress, born in Oneonta
- Louise Hall Tharp, biographer, born in Oneonta
- Jerry Jeff Walker, country music singer, born in Oneonta
- Carleton E. Watkins, 19th-century California nature photographer, born in Oneonta

== See also ==
- Springbrook, not-for-profit organization located in Oneonta
