= Zion Episcopal Church Complex and Harmony Cemetery =

Historic site in Otsego County, New York

- U.S. National Register of Historic Places
- U.S. Historic district
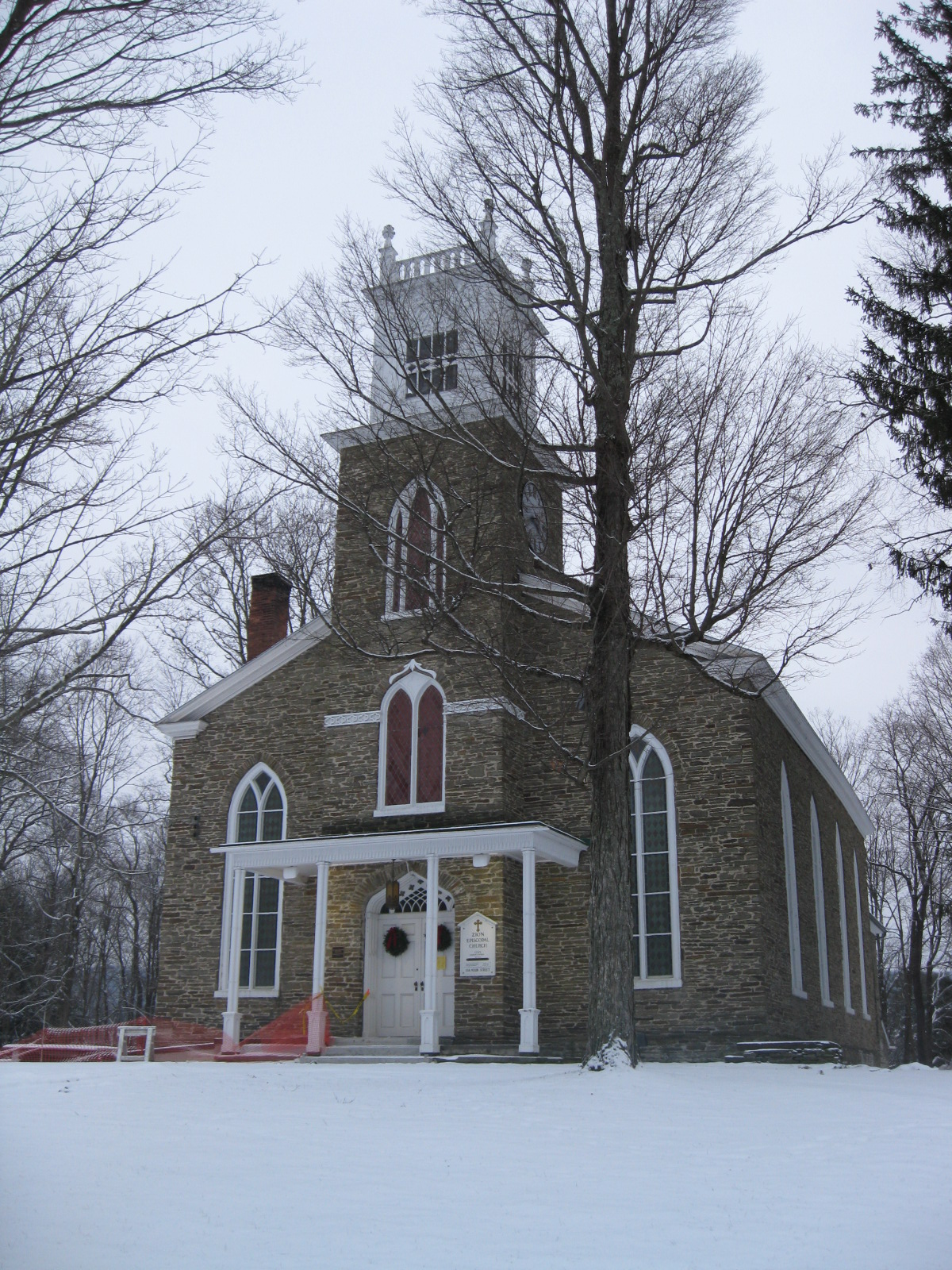
- Zion Episcopal Church, December 2009

- Location within New York Location within the United States
- Nearest city: Morris, New York
- Coordinates: 42°32′56″N 75°14′35″W
- Area: 6 acres (2.4 ha)
- Built: 1800
- Architectural style: Gothic Revival
- NRHP reference No.: 97001456
- Added to NRHP: November 24, 1997

Zion Episcopal Church Complex and Harmony Cemetery is a national historic district comprising a historic Episcopal church complex and cemetery located at Morris in Otsego County, New York. The complex consists of the church, rectory (1893), and parish house (1901). The church was built in 1818 and is a stone building in the early English Gothic Revival style. It features a steeply sloping gable roof and a central projecting bell tower with a belfry with a balustrade. The Harmony Cemetery has burials dating from about 1800 to 1937.

It was listed on the National Register of Historic Places in 1997.

== Gallery ==
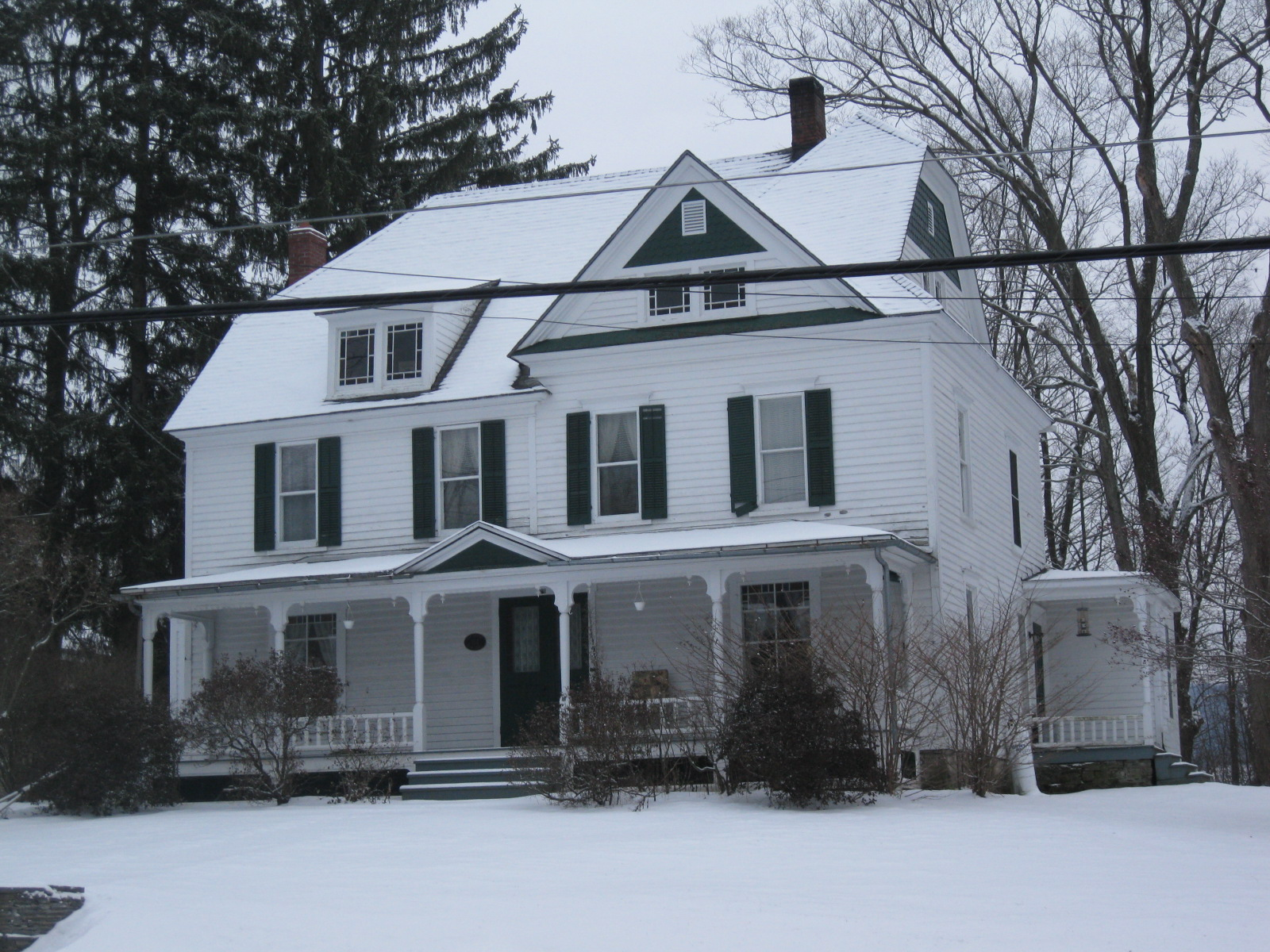
Zion Episcopal Church Rectory, December 2009

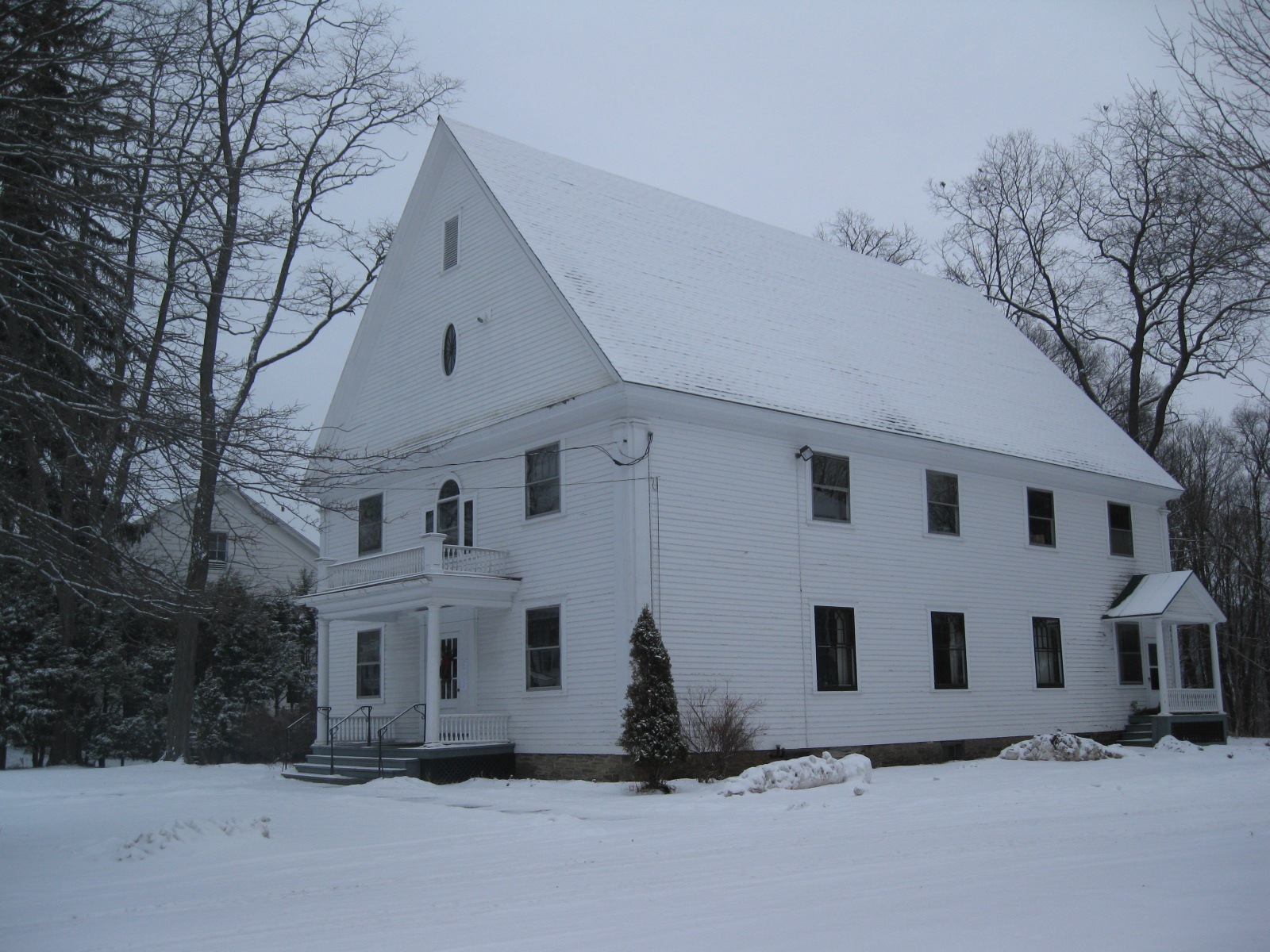
Zion Episcopal Church Parish Hall, December 2009
