= Morris (village), New York =

Morris, New York
- Village
- Location within the state of New York
- Coordinates: 42°33′N 75°15′W
- Country: United States
- State: New York
- County: Otsego
- Town: Morris

Area
  - Total: 0.75 sq mi (1.95 km^{2})
  - Land: 0.75 sq mi (1.93 km^{2})
  - Water: 0.0077 sq mi (0.02 km^{2})
- Elevation: 1,145 ft (349 m)

Population (2020)
  - Total: 486
  - Density: 651.8/sq mi (251.66/km^{2})
- Time zone: UTC-5 (Eastern (EST))
  - Summer (DST): UTC-4 (EDT)
- ZIP code: 13808
- Area code: 607
- FIPS code: 36-48483
- GNIS feature ID: 0957686
- Website: www.morrisny.org

Morris is a village in Otsego County, New York, United States. The population was 486 at the 2020 census. The village is centrally located in the town of Morris, and is northwest of the city of Oneonta.

== History ==
The village was originally called "Louisville" by early French settlers, of whom Andre Renouard and family are the first known, the Franchots staying with them their first winter. When incorporated in 1870, the name was changed to "Morris" so as to avoid confusion with the other Louisville, New York. The water of Butternut Creek was used to power many textile mills in the valley, including the Hargrave factory on Lake St. and Butternuts Wool & Cotton Co. just below the village. Spring Street off West Main was laid out to a new plant that went bankrupt before machinery was installed when the local textile industry collapsed. More recently Spring St. has been abandoned, with Morris Central School expansion over what had once been planned as a development.

== Geography ==
Morris is located at 42°33′N 75°15′W (42.5481, -75.2451).

According to the United States Census Bureau, the village has a total area of 0.7 square mile (1.9 km^{2}), of which 0.7 square mile (1.9 km^{2}) is land and 1.35% is water.

Morris is located at the junction of New York State Route 23 and New York State Route 51, which are conjoined in part of the village. County Highway 13 enters the village from the north.

The village is bounded to the east and south by Butternut Creek, a tributary of the Unadilla River.

== Demographics ==
Historical population
Census	Pop.	Note	%±
1880	768		—
1890	601		−21.7%
1900	558		−7.2%
1910	535		−4.1%
1920	420		−21.5%
1930	554		31.9%
1940	599		8.1%
1950	641		7.0%
1960	677		5.6%
1970	675		−0.3%
1980	681		0.9%
1990	642		−5.7%
2000	591		−7.9%
2010	583		−1.4%
2020	486		−16.6%
U.S. Decennial Census

As of the census of 2000, there were 591 people, 261 households, and 174 families residing in the village. The population density was 810.4 inhabitants per square mile (312.9/km^{2}). There were 284 housing units at an average density of 389.4 per square mile (150.3/km^{2}). The racial makeup of the village was 97.12% White, 0.34% Black or African American, 1.35% from other races, and 1.18% from two or more races. Hispanic or Latino of any race were 2.88% of the population.

There were 261 households, out of which 27.6% had children under the age of 18 living with them, 49.0% were married couples living together, 13.4% had a female householder with no husband present, and 33.3% were non-families. 29.1% of all households were made up of individuals, and 12.6% had someone living alone who was 65 years of age or older. The average household size was 2.26 and the average family size was 2.71.

In the village, the population was spread out, with 23.2% under the age of 18, 5.9% from 18 to 24, 25.9% from 25 to 44, 27.4% from 45 to 64, and 17.6% who were 65 years of age or older. The median age was 40 years. For every 100 females, there were 78.0 males. For every 100 females age 18 and over, there were 83.1 males.

The median income for a household in the village was $32,417, and the median income for a family was $36,875. Males had a median income of $30,804 versus $25,750 for females. The per capita income for the village was $17,388. About 11.1% of families and 15.3% of the population were below the poverty line, including 21.3% of those under age 18 and 6.4% of those age 65 or over.
