= Loon Island =

Sunken island in New York, United States

- Loon Island as shoal in the Canadarago Lake

- Location within New York

Geography
- Location: Canadarago Lake
- Coordinates: 42°49′43.438″N 75°00′7.5″W

Administration
- United States
- State: New York
- County: Otsego
- Town: Richfield

Loon Island is a sunken island on Canadarago Lake in Otsego County, New York, United States, which sank in the early 19th century. Smaller than the remaining Deowongo Island on the lake, the "sunken island" was less than an acre in size. Its southern shore was marshy, but the northern end of the island (toward Richfield Springs) had trees and vegetation.

One theory as to how it sank is that in 1816..."the year without a summer", there was an early spring thaw and the streams that fed Canadarago were running high. Their water flow covered the lake ice. A north wind blew the ice pack into the southern portion of the lake. Not long after that, there was a hard freeze and the winds shifted from out of the south. The ice pack, larger than before, was sent back in the opposite direction. The saw effect took off the surface soil of Loon Island and took down the trees and vegetation. It has been under water ever since.
