= Herkimer Creek =

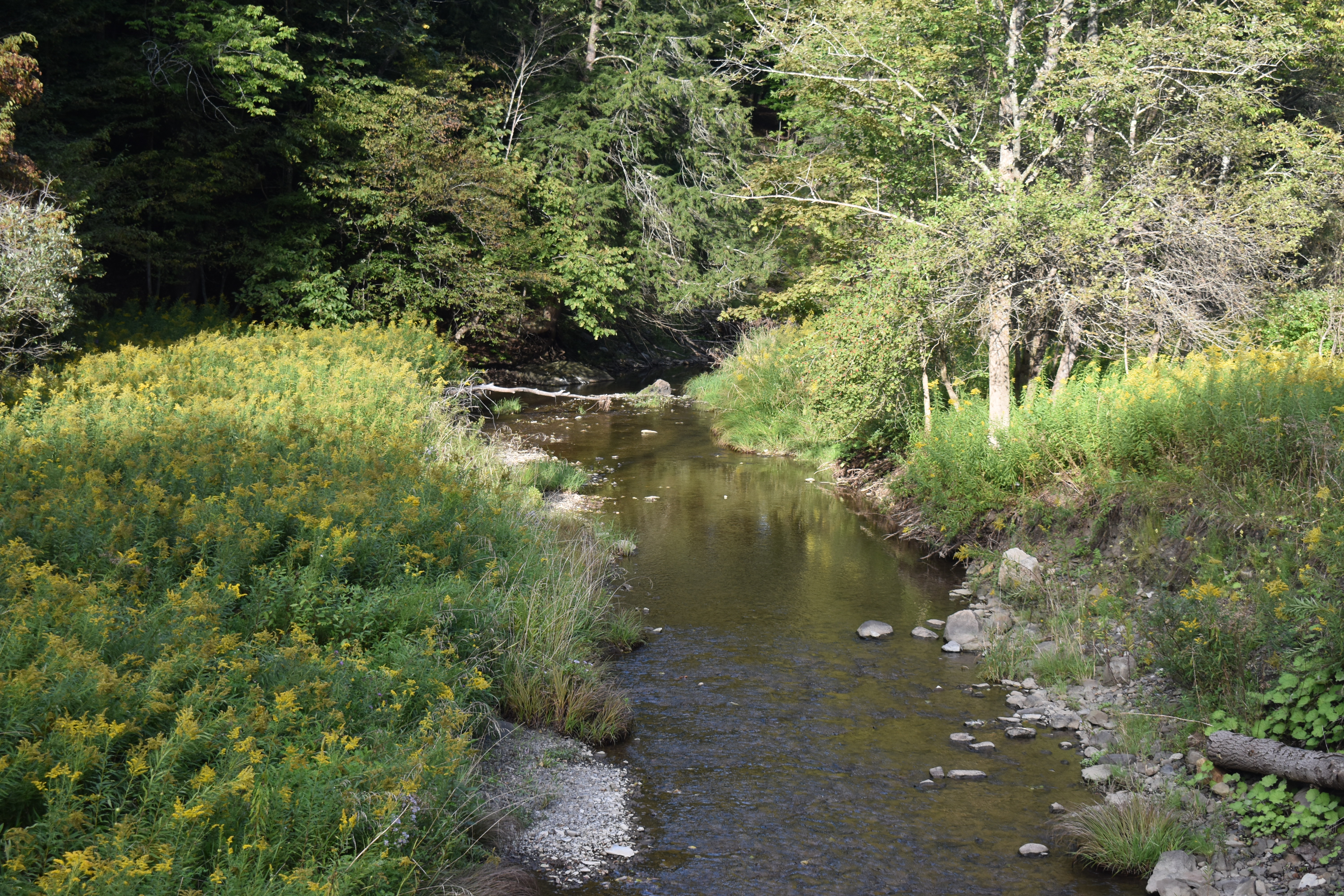

- Location of the mouth of Herkimer Creek Herkimer Creek (the United States)

Location
- Country: United States
- State: New York
- Region: Central New York
- County: Otsego
- Towns: Exeter, Richfield

Physical characteristics
- Source
  - location: West-southwest of Richfield
  - coordinates: 42°51′07″N 75°05′03″W
  - elevation: Approximately 1,745 ft (532 m)
- Mouth: Canadarago Lake
  - location: Northeast of Schuyler Lake
  - coordinates: 42°47′31″N 75°01′00″W
  - elevation: 1,280 ft (390 m)
- Basin size: 12.1 sq mi (31 km^{2})

Basin features
- Progression: Hyder Creek → Canadarago Lake → Oaks Creek → Susquehanna River → Chesapeake Bay → Atlantic Ocean
- Tributaries
  - right: Sutherland Creek

Herkimer Creek is a river in Otsego County in the state of New York. It begins west-southwest of the Hamlet of Richfield and northwest of the Hamlet of Dogtown and begins flowing mostly southeast before flowing into Canadarago Lake northeast of the Hamlet of Schuyler Lake.

== Fishing ==
Suckers can be speared and taken from the creek from January 1 to May 15, each year.
