= List of New York State Historic Markers in Otsego County, New York =

This is an incomplete list of New York State Historic Markers in Otsego County, New York.

== Listings county-wide ==
| | Marker name | Image | Date designated | Location | City or Town | Coords | Marker text |
|---|---|---|---|---|---|---|---|
| 1 | FARM AND GRAVE | Photograph of a roadside historic marker along State Highway 80 in Burlington, Otsego County, New York. Text on the marker reads FARM AND GRAVE JEDEDIAH PECK 1747 - 1821 FATHER OF THE COMMON SCHOOL SYSTEM OF THE STATE OF NEW YORK | | On State Highway 80 About 2½ Miles East Of Burlington | Burlington, Town Of, New York | 42°43′41.2″N 75°04′34.7″W | Jedediah Peck 1747–1821 Father Of The Common School System Of The State Of New York |
| 2 | 1/2 MILE NORTH TO SITE | | | On Us 20 At Cherry Valley | Cherry Valley, Town Of, New York | | Fortified Home Of Col. Samuel Campbell 1778 |
| 3 | 2/5 MILES WEST TO SITE OF | | | On Us 20 At Cherry Valley | Cherry Valley, Town Of, New York | | Dunlop Home Destroyed At Time Of Cherry Valley Massacre November 11, 1778 |
| 4 | CHERRY VALLEY | | | On Us 20 At Cherry Valley | Cherry Valley, Town Of, New York | | Massacre 1778 Monument 1/5 Mile South |
| 5 | ARROW | | | On Us 20 At Cherry Valley | Cherry Valley, Town Of, New York | | 2 Miles North To Moruth Rock Marking Spot Where Lieut. Wormuth Fell 1778 Shot By Joseph Brant First Left, Then Right Fork |
| 6 | OLD STONE CHURCH | | | On Nys 28 At Schuyler Lake | Exeter, Town Of, New York | | Built 1839-40 By George Herkimer Now Used As A Universalist Church |
| 7 | SITE OF | | | On Nys 28 At Schuyler Lake | Exeter, Town Of, New York | | Herkimer Cemetery Hendrick Herkimer, Brother Of Gen. Nicholas Herkimer, His Sons, George And Abraham, Who Served In American Revolution, Are Buried Here |
| 8 | SITE OF | | | On Nys 28 At Schuyler Lake | Exeter, Town Of, New York | | Herkimer Farm Original Herkimer Homestead In Exeter, Then Tryon Co. Settled By Hendrick Herkimer Prior To Revolution |
| 9 | ABNER ADAMS | | 1932 | On Town Rd. About 1½ Miles N.e. Of South Hartwick | Hartwick, Town Of, New York | | 1745–1825 Revolutionary Soldier; One Of Israel Putnam's Rangers; Is Buried In This Cemetery |
| 10 | HARTWICK COLLEGE | | | On College Campus At Clinton & West Sts. | Hartwick, Town Of, New York | | Founded As Hartwick Seminary 1797 Chartered As Hartwick College February 17, 1928 |
| 11 | HARTWICK SEMINARY | View of the site in 2018 | | On Nys 28 At Hartwick Seminary | Hartwick, Town Of, New York | | Oldest Lutheran Theological School In America. Founded 1797 By Rev. John Christopher Hartwick. Located Here 1816 |
| 12 | HOME OF | | | On Nys 205 At Hartwick | Hartwick, Town Of, New York | | Marcus Wells 1815–1895 Wrote World Famous Hymn "Holy Spirit, Faithful Guide" |
| 13 | SOUTH HARTWICK | | | On E. Main St. In Hartwick | Hartwick, Town Of, New York | | Cemetery 1812 Rev. Ebenezer White, 1770–1813, Noted Methodist Itinerant Minister Is Buried Here |
| 14 | BUTTERNUT VALLEY | | 1936 | On NYS Highway 51 About 2 Miles Northeast Of Village of Morris | Morris, Town Of, New York | 42°34′25.67″N 75°12′15.25″W | Named For Three Butternut Trees Growing From One Stump, The Original Corner Of Hillington, Wells And Otego Patents 1170' Due S.e. |
| 15 | REVOLUTIONARY ARMY CAMP | | | On NYS 7 About 2 Miles Northeast Of Otego | Otego, Town Of, New York | 42°24′50.13″N 75°8′53.33″W | Army Camp Sullivan-clinton Forces Camped Near This Spot August 11, 1779 |
| 16 | WILLIAM YATES | | 1965 | On NYS 23 About 1 Mile East Of the Village of Morris | Morris, Town Of, New York | 42°32′47.5″N 75°13′18.6″W | Historic Marker for William Yates, Baronet, Humanitarian, Noted Doctor, From Sapperton, Eng. Introduced Vaccination in America at Philadelphia in 1799. Died, Morris, Mar. 1857 Erected 1965 Zion Church |
| 17 | CLINTON'S DAM | | | On Lake St. At Cooperstown | Otsego, Town Of, New York | | Dam Opened August 9, 1779 2000 Men And 200 Bateaux Went Down The Susquehanna |
| 18 | COUNCIL ROCK | New York State Education Department Historical Marker with the text "Council Rock Famous Meeting Place of the Indians." 1932 | 1932 | On Lake St. In Cooperstown | Otsego, Town Of, New York | 42°42′03.7″N 74°55′14.1″W | Famous Meeting Place Of The Indians |
| 19 | GEORGE CROGHAN | | | On Main St. At Cooperstown | Otsego, Town Of, New York | | Indian Agent - Land Speculator Lived In Pioneer Log House Located Here 1769–1770. General James Clinton's Headquarters Here 1779. |
| 20 | HUTTERS POINT | | | On Nys 80 About 4½ Miles North Of Cooperstown | Otsego, Town Of, New York | | Where Hettie Saved Her Father, Tom Hutter And Hurry Harry From The Huron "Deerslayer" |
| 21 | SUNKEN ISLAND | | | On Nys 80 About 5 Miles North Of Cooperstown | Otsego County, Town of East Springfield, New York | | Home Of Tom Hutter "Deerslayer". |
| 22 | BUTTERNUT ROAD | | | On Butternut Rd. About 1/2 Mile East Of Richfield Springs | Richfield, Town Of, New York | | Indian Trail From Fort Plain To Unadilla; On Map By British Officer, 1757, During French And Indian War |
| 23 | FEDERAL CORNERS | | | On Butternut Rd. About 1 Mile Southeast Of Richfield Springs | Richfield, Town Of, New York | | Former Home Of Lemuel Vibber, Owner Of Twelve- Forge Blacksmith Shop. House Erected 1798 Opened To Public 1820 |
| 24 | FEDERAL CORNERS | | | On Butternut Rd. About 1 Mile Southeast Of Richfield Springs | Richfield, Town Of, New York | | Once A Busy Hamlet, Site Of Averill Inn, Vibber's Twelve- Forge Shop, Store, Tannery. Home, School Of Dr. Jas. L. Palmer Physician And Teacher |
| 25 | FRENCH WAR-1757 | | | On Us 20 At Richfield Springs | Richfield, Town Of, New York | | Here English Troops Guided By Indians Sought Sulphur Deposit Site Great Sulphur Spring Opened To Public 1820 |
| 26 | MONTICELLO | | | On Co. Rd. At Richfield | Richfield, Town Of, New York | | Site Of Baptist Church Built 1824, Razed 1920, Nearly Opposite Site of Universalist Church Built 1880, Razed 1921 |
| 27 | RICHFIELD HOTEL | | | On Us 20 At Richfield Springs | Richfield, Town Of, New York | | Oldest Tavern In Richfield; Built By Nathan Dow In 1816, Who Was With Ethan Allen At Ticonderoga. First Summer Guests, 1821, When Board Was $1.25 Per Week |
| 28 | SITE OF | | | On Co. Rd. About 1/2 Mile Norwest Of Richfield | Richfield, Town Of, New York | | Beardsley Home Built 1790 In Forest By Obadiah Beardsley And Family First Settlers In Richfield. St. Luke's Church, A Library And School Were Founded Soon After |
| 29 | CONTINENTAL SCHOOL | | | On Town Rd. 2 Miles South Of Middle Springfield | Springfield, Town Of, New York | | Log Schoolhouse On This Site In 1797 First Sunday School In Town Organized Here 1819 |
| 30 | FIRST CHURCH | | | On Us 20 At Middle Springfield | Springfield, Town Of, New York | | In Springfield, And First Baptist Church West Of Hudson Valley 1787. Used By All Denominations And For Town Meetings |
| 31 | NEAR HERE STOOD THE | | | On Co. Rd. About 1/2 Mile North Of E. Springfield | Springfield, Town Of, New York | | Log School House, Probably First In The Town. Built Before Organization Of Spring- Field In 1797 |
| 32 | ONE OF THE EARLY | | | On Us 20 At East Springfield | Springfield, Town Of, New York | | Toll Gates On The Third Division Of The Western Turnpike Completed In 1808 |
| 33 | SPALSBERRY | | | On County Rd. About 1½ Miles North Of East Springfield | Springfield, Town Of, New York | | Center An Early Settlement Here Burned By Indians Under Joseph Brant June 18, 1778 |
| 34 | ARROW | | | On Us 20 At Middle Springfield | Springfield, Town Of, New York | | Clinton Camp Occupied By 4Th Pennsylvania Regiment Who Served As Guard For Supply Wagons 1779 |
| 35 | ARROW | | | On Us 20 At Middle Springfield | Springfield, Town Of, New York | | Camp And Fort At Hyde Bay, Otsego Lake 1½ Miles South, Occupied By 4Th Massachusetts Regiment 1779 |
| 36 | FIRST CHURCH | | | On Nys 7 At Worcester | Worcester, Town Of, New York | | In Village Of Worcester Organized 1792 As Congregational Became Presbyterian 1917 Present Edifice Erected 1892 |
| 37 | GARFIELD FARM | | | On Nys 7 At Worcester | Worcester, Town Of, New York | | Site Of Home Of Solomon Garfield And Son Thomas. Abram Garfield, Father Of President James A. Garfield Lived Here Prior To 1827 |
| 38 | MURPHY HOME | | | On Co. Rd. About 1 Mile West Of So. Worcester | Worcester, Town Of, New York | | Timothy Murphy, Famous Revolutionary Soldier, Lived On This Farm 1812–1817 |
| 39 | HYDE HALL COVERED BRIDGE | | 1998 | In the vicinity of East Lake Road within Glimmerglass State Park | Springfield, Town of, New York | 42°47′25″N 74°51′49″W | Built by Andrew Alden, Lorenzo Bates and Cerenus Clark in 1825, the Hyde Hall Covered Bridge is not only the oldest existing covered bridge in New York state, but in the United States. Restored in 1967 by the State of New York and placed on the State and National Registers of Historic Places in 1998. NY State Covered Bridge Society – 2006 |

== See also ==
- List of New York State Historic Markers
- National Register of Historic Places listings in New York
- List of National Historic Landmarks in New York
