= Lidell Corners, New York =

- Hamlet
- Location within the state of New York
- Coordinates: 42°45′45″N 75°01′43″W
- Country: United States
- State: New York
- County: Otsego
- Town: Exeter
- Elevation: 1,319 ft (402 m)
- Time zone: UTC-5 (Eastern (EST))
  - Summer (DST): UTC-4 (EDT)
- ZIP code: 13457
- Area code: 607

Lidell Corners is a hamlet south of Schuyler Lake located at the corner of CR-16 and NY-28 in the Town of Richfield. Lidell Creek flows into Oaks Creek east of the hamlet.

William Lidell built a farmhouse at the intersection in the 1700s, the source of the location's namesake.

In the late 1970s through 1990s this original homestead was saved and preserved by historian John Stoltenborg who also served as historian to the town of Exeter. An expert in Federal period furniture and folk art portraits, Mr. Stoltenborg and his wife Janet guided a successful antiques business from the homestead in addition to setting up Lidell family reunions to keep the history of the space alive.
