= Sunset Hill =

Sunset Hill or Sunset Hills may refer to:

- Sunset Hills, Los Angeles, a neighborhood with a Los Angeles Historic-Cultural Monument in Hollywood
- Sunset Hill (Aberdeen, Mississippi)
- Sunset Hill, a neighborhood of the Country Club District, Kansas City, Missouri
- Sunset Hills, Missouri
- Sunset Hill (Otsego County, New York), an elevation in Otsego County, New York
- Sunset Hill (Warren, New York)
- Sunset Hill, Spokane, a neighborhood in Washington
- Sunset Hill, Seattle, a neighborhood and park in the Ballard area of Seattle, Washington
- Sunset Hill (Alderson, West Virginia)
