= Lidell Creek =

- Location of the mouth of Lidell Creek Lidell Creek (the United States)

Location
- Country: United States
- State: New York
- Region: Central New York Region
- County: Otsego
- Towns: Exeter, Otsego

Physical characteristics
- Source
  - coordinates: 42°45′30″N 75°04′22″W
- Mouth: Oaks Creek
  - location: Lidell Corners, Otsego County, New York
  - coordinates: 42°45′37″N 75°00′57″W
  - elevation: 1,266 ft (386 m)

Lidell Creek is a small creek in the town of Exeter in Otsego County, New York. Lidell Creek flows into Oaks Creek by Lidell Corners, south of the Hamlet of Schuyler Lake.
