= Federal Corners, New York =

Federal Corners
- Hamlet

- Location within New York Location within the United States
- Coordinates: 42°50′30″N 74°58′36″W
- Country: United States
- State: New York
- County: Otsego
- Town: Richfield
- Time zone: UTC-5 (Eastern (EST))
  - Summer (DST): UTC-4 (EDT)
- Area code: 315

Federal Corners is a former hamlet located in the Town of Richfield, New York, in Otsego County, United States, approximately 1.5 miles southeast of the village of Richfield Springs, at the corner of Butternut Road and Cemetery Road.

Federal Corners "lay near the intersection of an old route from the Mohawk Valley to Canadarago Lake and the Third Great Western Turnpike, opened in 1808". Most above-ground remains of the hamlet have disappeared, since "its economy failed by the early 1840s".

== History ==
According to a 19th-century history of the area,

Federal Corners was a place of importance. Here was a hotel kept by Mr. Averill; a store kept in turn by Mr. Ballard, Holcomb & Weber, and Edward Cheeseman; a 12-forge blacksmith shop and auger factory run by Mr. Vibber; and a tannery operated by John Williams. Here, too, was the home and office of Dr. James L. Palmer, a pioneer physician of the region, and a noted instructor and preceptor. For many years his home was the school, where as many as a dozen young men at a time, were studying medicine and surgery.

The Lemuel F. Vibber House, constructed about 1810 in Federal Corners and still standing, is listed in the National Register of Historic Places.
