= Vibber =

Vibber is a rare surname found predominantly in the United States. It is thought to have about 170 bearers in the country and 6 bearers elsewhere. The 2000 U.S. census found 104 people with this surname, all but four of whom identified as non-Hispanic white.

Notable people with the surname include:

- Brooke Vibber (fl. 2001–2026), former lead developer of MediaWiki
- Larry Vibber, superintendent of Fowler School District in Fowler, Colorado, U.S. from 1962 to 2009
- Sarah Vibber (c. 1656 – ????), who was both accuser and accused in the Salem witch trials

== See also ==
- Lemuel F. Vibber House, historic house located in Richfield Springs, New York, U.S.
