= Daniel Nash =

American Episcopal priest and missionary (1763–1837)

Daniel Nash (1763 – June 4, 1837) was an Episcopal priest and missionary to Native Americans and European settlers on the frontier of central New York.

Nash was born in Great Barrington, Massachusetts. He graduated from Yale University in Connecticut, became a teacher, and studied for ordination as an Episcopal priest. He moved to New Lebanon, New York, during the 1790s. There, he taught school, became a lay leader in the church, and met his wife and missionary partner-to-be, Olive Lusk. Nash was ordained on October 11, 1801.

The Nashes and their child moved to the newly settled regions of western Otsego County, New York, where they held services in the small settlements at Richfield, Exeter and Morris. He also preached to members of the Oneida tribe. Between 1804 and 1816, he performed 496 baptisms and organized 12 parishes in the area.

In 1800, Nash presided over the funeral of Hannah Cooper, sister of James Fenimore Cooper. He was also the first rector of Christ Church in Cooperstown.

There is another Daniel Nash, who was a Presbyterian minister during the early 1800s. He is known today for having worked during the Second Great Awakening, in relation to the ministry of evangelist Charles Grandison Finney. He was born in Abington, Massachusetts, on November 27, 1775, and died on December 20, 1831, in Verona, New York.

Nash is of interest to genealogists of New York State for the baptismal records he kept.
