= Mink Creek (Canadarago Lake tributary) =

Creek in Otsego County, New York

Otskonoga Mink Creek, Trout Brook
- Location of the mouth of Mink Creek Mink Creek (Canadarago Lake tributary) (the United States)
- Native name: Otskonoga (Iroquoian languages)

Location
- Country: United States
- State: New York
- Region: Central New York
- County: Otsego
- Town: Richfield

Physical characteristics
- Source
  - location: West-northwest of Richfield Springs
  - coordinates: 42°52′01″N 75°01′26″W
  - elevation: Approximately 1,420 ft (430 m)
- Mouth: Canadarago Lake
  - location: South of Richfield Springs
  - coordinates: 42°50′21″N 75°00′01″W
  - elevation: 1,280 ft (390 m)
- Basin size: 10.8 sq mi (28 km^{2})

Basin features
- Progression: Hyder Creek → Canadarago Lake → Oaks Creek → Susquehanna River → Chesapeake Bay → Atlantic Ocean
- River system: Susquehanna

Mink Creek or Otskonoga, also known as Trout Brook, is a stream in northern Otsego County, New York. Its source is adjacent to US Route 20 just east of the community of Brighton and west-northwest of the Village of Richfield Springs and flows northeast into an unnamed swamp in adjacent Herkimer County. It then exits the swamp and flows south back into Otsego County before converging with Canadarago Lake south of Richfield Springs. The Iroquois' name for the creek is Otskonoga.

== Fishing ==
Suckers can be speared and taken from the creek from January 1 to May 15, each year.
