= Herkimer =

Herkimer may refer to:

People

- Johan Jost Herkimer (1732–1795), United Empire Loyalist, brother of Nicholas Herkimer
- John Herkimer (1773–1848), American lawyer and politician from New York
- Lawrence Herkimer (1925–2015), American innovator in the field of cheerleading
- Nicholas Herkimer (c. 1728–1777), militia general in the American Revolutionary War

Places

- Fort Herkimer, a fort located on the southern side of the Mohawk River in central New York
- Herkimer County, New York, a county located in the U.S. state of New York
  - Herkimer (town), New York, a town in Herkimer County, New York
  - Herkimer (village), New York, a village in Herkimer County, New York
- Herkimer, Kansas
- Herkimer Street, a road in Hamilton, Ontario, Canada
- Herkimer Street, a street in Baltimore, Maryland
- Herkimer Creek, a creek in Otsego County, New York

Other

- Herkimer diamond, a generic name for double-terminated quartz crystals first discovered in Herkimer County, New York
- USS Herkimer. An Alamosa-class cargo ship that served the US Navy during the final months of World War II; later serving as USAT Herkimer, with the US Army and then as USNS Herkimer with the Military Sea Transportation Service
- Herkimer, a supervillain that was an enemy of Shazam
- Herkimer, a fictional disembodied head from the TV series Special Unit 2
- Herkimer Battle Jitney, a fictional armoured truck in the 1999 movie Mystery Men
