= Ocquionis Creek =

Oquionis Creek Fish Creek
- Location of the mouth of Ocquionis Creek Ocquionis Creek (the United States)

Location
- Country: United States
- State: New York
- Region: Central New York Region
- Counties: Herkimer, Otsego
- Towns: Warren, Richfield

Physical characteristics
- Source
  - location: Northeast of Jordanville
  - coordinates: 42°55′08″N 74°56′36″W
  - elevation: 1,489 ft (454 m)
- Mouth: Canadarago Lake
  - location: South of Richfield Springs
  - coordinates: 42°50′25″N 74°59′34″W
  - elevation: 1,270 ft (390 m)
- Basin size: 22.3 sq mi (58 km^{2})

Ocquionis Creek, also known as Fish Creek, is a river in southern Herkimer County and northern Otsego County in the State of New York. It begins northeast of the Hamlet of Jordanville and flows generally southward before flowing into the northern end of Canadarago Lake south of the Village of Richfield Springs. Ocquionis is an Iroquois word that translates to "he is a bear".

== Course ==
Ocquionis Creek begins northeast of the Hamlet of Jordanville and flows southward through Jordanville crossing under NY 167. After a short distance it turns to the east, then south, then west where it crosses under NY 167 again. After a short distance it turns south and crosses under Osley Road, then turns east and then south just before crossing NY 167, then passes to the west of the Hamlet of Cullen. After passing Cullen it continues to closely follow to the west of NY 167 before turning to the west just before Bloomfield Road. After a short distance it turns south, traveling through the Village of Richfield Springs and crosses under US 20 before flowing into Canadarago Lake south of the Village of Richfield Springs.

== History ==
Ocquionis Creek was used by early settlers, in the Jordanville area, for baptisms and likened by them to the Jordan River.

== Hydrology ==
The United States Geological Survey (USGS) formally maintained two stream gauges along the Ocquionis Creek.

The upper one, in operation from June 1963 to September 1973, was located in the Village of Richfield Springs just south of the Ann Street bridge. At this station non-daily field measurements, at random intervals, were recorded. The highest measured discharge of 233 cubic feet per second (6.6 m^{3}/s) was on June 26, 1963, and the minimum discharge of .86 cubic feet per second (0.024 m^{3}/s) was on September 12, 1963.

The lower one, in operation from June 1968 to April 1978, was located in the Village of Richfield Springs just south of the US 20 bridge. At this station non-daily field measurements, at random intervals, were recorded. The highest measured discharge of 233 cubic feet per second (6.6 m^{3}/s) was on May 5, 1971, and the minimum discharge of .49 cubic feet per second (0.014 m^{3}/s) was on September 23, 1973.
