= Fox Falls =

- Location within New York
- Coordinates: 42°49′21″N 74°58′59″W
- Elevation: 1,480 ft (450 m)
- Watercourse: unnamed creek

Fox Falls is a waterfall in Otsego County, New York. It is located south-southeast of Richfield Springs.
