= Hyder Creek =

- Location of the mouth of Hyder Creek Hyder Creek (the United States)

Location
- Country: United States
- State: New York
- Region: Central New York
- County: Otsego
- Town: Richfield

Physical characteristics
- Source
  - location: West of Richfield
  - coordinates: 42°51′29″N 75°04′57″W
  - elevation: Approximately 1,700 ft (520 m)
- Mouth: Canadarago Lake
  - location: South of Richfield Springs
  - coordinates: 42°48′44″N 75°01′05″W
  - elevation: 1,280 ft (390 m)
- Basin size: 9.59 sq mi (24.8 km^{2})

Basin features
- Progression: Hyder Creek → Canadarago Lake → Oaks Creek → Susquehanna River → Chesapeake Bay → Atlantic Ocean

Hyder Creek is a river in Otsego County in the state of New York. It begins west of the Hamlet of Richfield and flows east, then southeast before flowing into Canadarago Lake south of the Village of Richfield Springs.

== Fishing ==
Suckers can be speared and taken from the creek from January 1 to May 15, each year.
