= Baker Octagon Barn =

- U.S. National Register of Historic Places
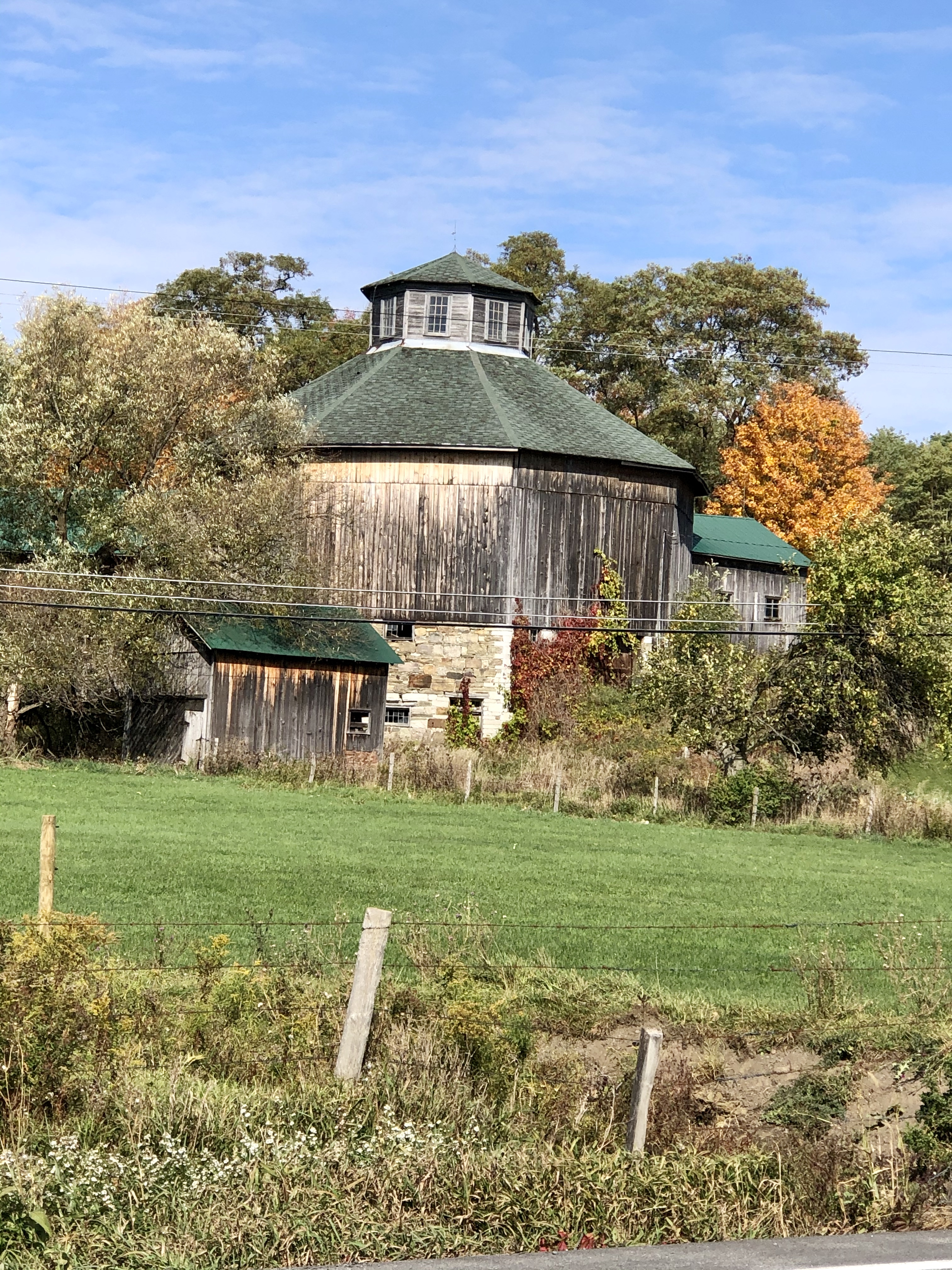

- Location within New York Location within the United States
- Location: State Route 28, Richfield Springs, New York
- Coordinates: 42°49′25″N 75°0′56″W
- Area: less than one acre
- Built: 1882
- Architectural style: Octagon Mode
- MPS: Central Plan Dairy Barns of New York TR
- NRHP reference No.: 84002887
- Added to NRHP: September 29, 1984

Baker Octagon Barn is a historic barn located in Richfield Springs in Otsego County, New York. It was built in 1882, and is a three-story, octagonal wood frame and fieldstone structure. It has a hipped roof and is topped by an octagonal cupola. The barn measures 60 feet in diameter.

It is octagonal, which meets the definition of being a round barn.

It was added to the National Register of Historic Places in 1984.
