= Gunset Hill =

Mountain in New York, United States

- Location within New York Location within the United States

Highest point
- Elevation: 1,742 feet (531 m)
- Coordinates: 42°51′31″N 75°01′15″W

Geography
- Location: Richfield Springs, New York, U.S.
- Topo map: USGS Schuyler Lake

Gunset Hill is a mountain located in Central New York Region of New York west of Richfield Springs, New York. It is located on the old Indian trail leading from the Mohawk castles on the Mohawk River, to the lands of the other Iroquois nations. At one point it was referred to as Bennets Hill. The hill derives its name because early settlers used to set guns for bear hunting, which were very numerous on the hill in those days.
