= Richfield (hamlet), New York =

Monticello, Central New York (Otsego County)

Monticello
- Hamlet
- Monticello (Richfield), New York
- Location within the state of New York
- Coordinates: 42°51′26″N 75°03′15″W
- Country: United States
- State: New York
- County: Otsego
- Town: Richfield

Government
  - Type: Hamlet (former village)
- Elevation: 1,480 ft (450 m)
- Time zone: UTC-5 (Eastern (EST))
  - Summer (DST): UTC-4 (EDT)
- ZIP code: 13439
- Area code: 315

Monticello is a hamlet west of Richfield Springs located at the corner of CR-24 and CR-25 in the Town of Richfield, Otsego County, New York, United States. The community is known by its historic name of Monticello. (In recent state use it may also be referenced as "Richfield"; however, in normal use, the name Richfield always refers to Richfield Springs.) It was once a busy hamlet along the Skaneateles Turnpike. The source of Hyder Creek is near the hamlet. Richfield Springs bears a street over a hill on the southwest of the village called Monticello Street, which leads directly to the hamlet.

== History ==
The little village of Monticello is located three miles west of Richfield Springs, on the old Skaneateles turnpike. It contains a population of 140. The business is represented by three stores, one hotel, three wagon-shops, two blacksmith-shops, and one cheese-factory. The surface of this portion of the township is broken or hilly; the land is fertile, and particularly adapted to grazing. Cheese is the great staple. During the past year (1877) 146,746 pounds were sold from the factory owned by Hiram C. Brockway. Large quantities of hops are also raised.

Among the most prominent of the early settlers were Darius Carey, Willard eddy, Obadiah Beardsley, John Woodbury, Seth Allen, Joseph Allen, Elijah Martin, Samuel Colwell, Amasa Firman, and Abner Ames.

John Woodbury lived to an advanced age, occupying until his death the farm upon which he first settled, now owned by his son, Daniel H. Woodbury.

In 1787, Seth Allen, Joseph Allen, and Elijah Martin took up a large tract of land in the vicinity of the Hyder Creek, a part of which now comprises the farms of Willis Perkins and Lydia Allen. Elijah Martin felled the first tree ever cut on this tract of land. West of the land, in this vicinity, was then owned by the Banyers of Albany, and could be purchased at the government price of $1.25 per acre. One of the descendants of Elijah Martin, Mrs. Collins Loomis, is still living in this village. Joseph Allen has numerous descendants, some occupying the old farm at the present time. Rd Eddy lived to be ninety-six years of age. Mrs. Elizabeth Beardsley, a daughter of Mr. Eddy, is still living, and is in her eighty-fifth year. Samuel Colwell settled upon the farm now owned by his son, James Colwell, in 1792, where he continued to reside until his death, which occurred twenty years since. Amasa Firman, Abner Ames, and Elisha Andrus have sons still living in town, all of whom have passed the allotted age of threescore and ten years.

A town library was established at an early period; the exact date I m unable to learn. But Levi Beardsley, in his "Reminiscences of Otsego," speaks of its existence long before 1810. This library now contains 900 volumes. There is also a circulating library containing 150 volumes.

The Otsego Herald was the first paper taken in town, and was the only paper for many years that the inhabitants had an opportunity of reading.

The first store was opened by Whitman Randall, and stood near the old cemetery in the western part of the village. A few rods east of this old store a house is still standing which was formerly owned by Jedediah P. Sill, and used by him for a gun-shop. A button-factory was also in this settlement.

The first school-house was built in 1803. It was located where the hotel now stands. At present, there are one public and two private schools. Jacob Brewster kept the first hotel (or tavern), in 1799. Mrs. Ezra Carey is one of his descendants. The second hotel was built by Benjamin Rathbun, in 1816. A. A. Jacobsen is the present proprietor. The first physician was Dr. Howes, who located here in 1814. In 1816, Dr. Horace Manley, who is still living at Richfield Springs, became associated with him in the practice of medicine.

In 1815 there was quite a cluster of houses, and the people desired not only a habitation, but a name for this little hamlet. A meeting was called, a ballot-box used, and one was to deposit a name to suit his fancy, and the first name drawn was to be the name of the village. Joseph Beardsley, son of Obadiah Beardsley, threw in the name of "Monticello." As this was the first drawn, it became the name. Mr. Beardsley being a staunch Democrat of the Jeffersonian order may account for his selection.

This place has always been justly celebrated for the longevity of its inhabitants. Within the radius of three-fourths of a mile there are now living ten persons whose united ages amount to eight hundred and eleven years, viz.: Gardner Sloan, one hundred; Mrs. Calvin Eaton, eighty-five; Mrs. Mason Corbin, eighty-five; Mr. David Andrus, eighty; Mr. Thomas Ames, eighty; Mrs. E. M. Shepherd, seventy-seven; Mrs. Charles Tuttle, seventy-eight; Mr. Isaac Huntley, seventy-seven; Mr. Albert Coats, seventy-two; Mr. Laman Brockway, seventy-seven. "Had Ponce de Leon extended his research to the regions of Richfield, he might not have found the fountain of immortal youth but he would have found that by breathing our invigorating mountain air his life would doubtless have been greatly prolonged."
