= Sunset Hill (Otsego County, New York) =

Mountain in New York, United States

- Location within New York Location within the United States

Highest point
- Elevation: 1,982 feet (604 m)
- Coordinates: 42°51′39″N 74°59′19″W

Geography
- Location: N of Richfield Springs, New York, U.S.
- Topo map: USGS Richfield Springs

Sunset Hill is a mountain in the Central New York Region of New York. It is located in the towns of Richfield and Warren, north of Richfield Springs. It was formally called Abbott's Hill, as it was the site of Aaron Abbott's home and also Butternut Hill, from the big butternut trees that once stood on the hill.
