= Fowler, Colorado =

Town in Colorado, United States

- Statutory Town
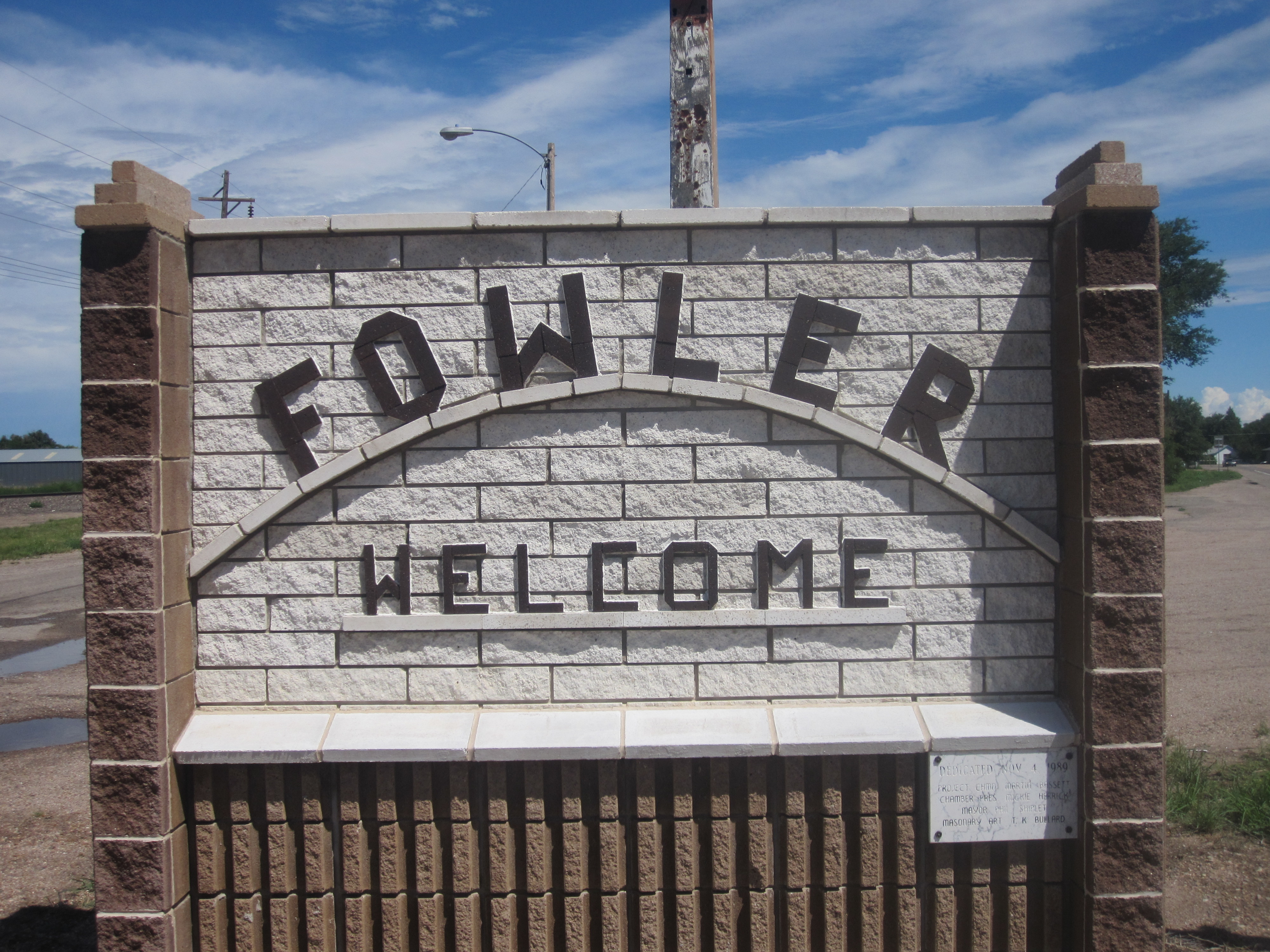
- Welcome Sign (2010)
- Motto: "A Great Place to Grow"
- Location of the Town of Fowler in Otero County, Colorado
- Coordinates: 38°07′39″N 104°01′36″W
- Country: United States
- State: Colorado
- County: Otero
- Incorporated (town): August 25, 1925

Area
  - Total: 0.563 sq mi (1.458 km^{2})
  - Land: 0 sq mi (0.000 km^{2})
  - Water: 0.559 sq mi (1.448 km^{2})
- Elevation: 4,341 ft (1,323 m)

Population (2020)
  - Total: 1,253
  - Density: 2,241/sq mi (865/km^{2})
- Time zone: UTC−07:00 (MST)
  - Summer (DST): UTC−06:00 (MDT)
- ZIP code: 81039
- Area code: 719
- FIPS code: 08-27975
- GNIS ID: 2412648
- Website: www.fowlercolorado.com

Fowler is a statutory town located in northwestern Otero County, Colorado, United States. The town population was 1,253 at the 2020 United States census.

== History ==
Fowler was established as a railroad station on the Atchison, Topeka and Santa Fe Railway. The town was originally named Oxford, for a large ox that was killed when crossing the railroad tracks. The Oxford, Colorado, post office opened on April 27, 1882, but the name was changed to Fowler on September 6, 1890. Fowler was named for Orson Squire Fowler, a phrenologist who founded the town. The Town of Fowler was incorporated on August 25, 1900.

== Geography ==
Fowler is located along the Arkansas River and U.S. highway route 50.

At the 2020 United States census, the town had a total area of 360 acres (1.458 km^{2}), including 2.5 acres (0.010 km^{2}) of water.

== Demographics ==
Historical population
Census	Pop.	Note	%±
1910	925		—
1920	1,062		14.8%
1930	968		−8.9%
1940	922		−4.8%
1950	1,025		11.2%
1960	1,240		21.0%
1970	1,241		0.1%
1980	1,227		−1.1%
1990	1,154		−5.9%
2000	1,206		4.5%
2010	1,182		−2.0%
2020	1,253		6.0%
U.S. Decennial Census

=== 2020 census ===
As of the 2020 census, Fowler had a population of 1,253. The median age was 43.7 years. 20.1% of residents were under the age of 18 and 24.3% of residents were 65 years of age or older. For every 100 females there were 92.2 males, and for every 100 females age 18 and over there were 89.9 males age 18 and over.

0.0% of residents lived in urban areas, while 100.0% lived in rural areas.

There were 552 households in Fowler, of which 25.7% had children under the age of 18 living in them. Of all households, 40.9% were married-couple households, 24.5% were households with a male householder and no spouse or partner present, and 31.2% were households with a female householder and no spouse or partner present. About 39.7% of all households were made up of individuals and 18.5% had someone living alone who was 65 years of age or older.

There were 616 housing units, of which 10.4% were vacant. The homeowner vacancy rate was 3.0% and the rental vacancy rate was 15.2%.

Racial composition as of the 2020 census
Race	Number	Percent
White	1,064	84.9%
Black or African American	4	0.3%
American Indian and Alaska Native	24	1.9%
Asian	0	0.0%
Native Hawaiian and Other Pacific Islander	0	0.0%
Some other race	62	4.9%
Two or more races	99	7.9%
Hispanic or Latino (of any race)	234	18.7%

=== 2000 census ===
As of the census of 2000, there were 1206 people, 521 households, and 330 families residing in the town. The population density was 2,468.5 inhabitants per square mile (953.1/km^{2}). There were 591 housing units at an average density of 1,209.7 per square mile (467.1/km^{2}). The racial makeup of the town was 95.02% White, 0.08% Black, 1.08% Native American, 0.17% Asian, 2.99% from other races, and 0.66% from two or more races. Latino or Hispanic of any race were 12.35% of the population.

There were 521 households, out of which 25.9% had children under the age of 18 living with them, 52.8% were married couples living together, 7.7% had a female householder with no husband present, and 36.5% were non-families. 34.5% of all households were made up of individuals, and 16.3% had someone living alone who was 65 years of age or older. The average household size was 2.22 and the average family size was 2.87.

In the town, the population was spread out, with 22.3% under the age of 18, 7.5% from 18 to 24, 22.5% from 25 to 44, 23.1% from 45 to 64, and 24.6% who were 65 years of age or older. The median age was 43 years. For every 100 females, there were 84.4 males. For every 100 females age 18 and over, there were 79.2 males.

The median income for a household in the town was $25,761, and the median income for a family was $32,143. Males had a median income of $25,536 versus $20,750 for females. The per capita income for the town was $15,501. About 11.3% of families and 11.9% of the population were below the poverty line, including 13.0% of those under age 18 and 9.3% of those age 65 or over.

== Government ==
The town has a small police department and fire department. In 1998, the magazine Westword included Fowler among examples of small police departments that struggled to hire or retain their police chiefs. Police chief Floyd Rogers was fired in 1997 after a string of controversies regarding the department's treatment of adolescents. After his firing a crowd of 60 adolescents rioted in Fowler, barricading U.S. Route 50, setting fires, and vandalizing the police station and two police cars.

== Education ==
The Fowler School District has one elementary school and one high school. The high school mascot is the Grizzlies.

== Transportation ==
Fowler is part of Colorado's Bustang network. It is along the Lamar-Pueblo-Colorado Springs Outrider line.

== Notable people ==
- Luke Hochevar, Major League Baseball pitcher (2007–2016); raised in Fowler and pitched at Fowler High School.
- Dutch Clark, American football player and coach, basketball player and coach

== Gallery ==
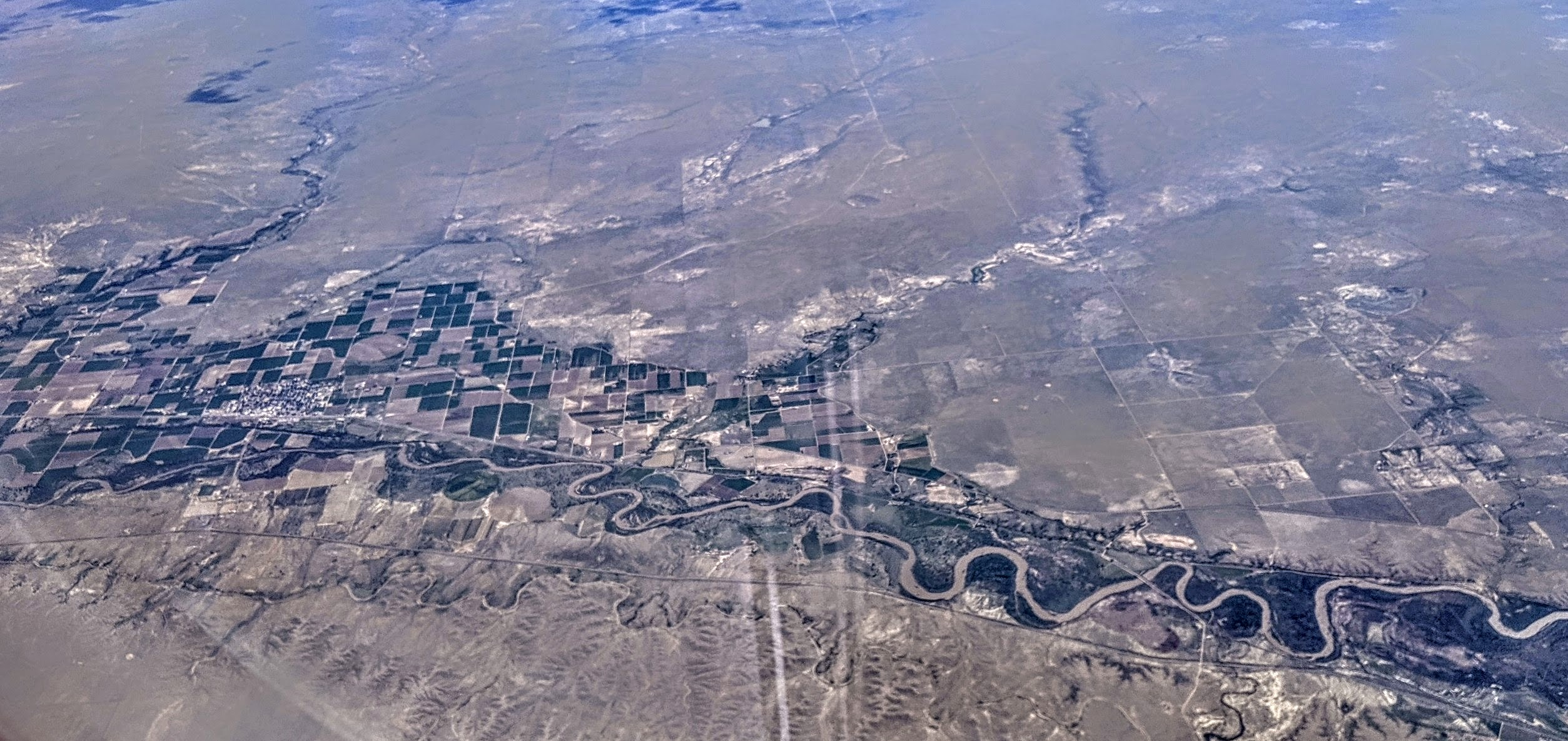
Aerial view of the Arkansas River at Fowler

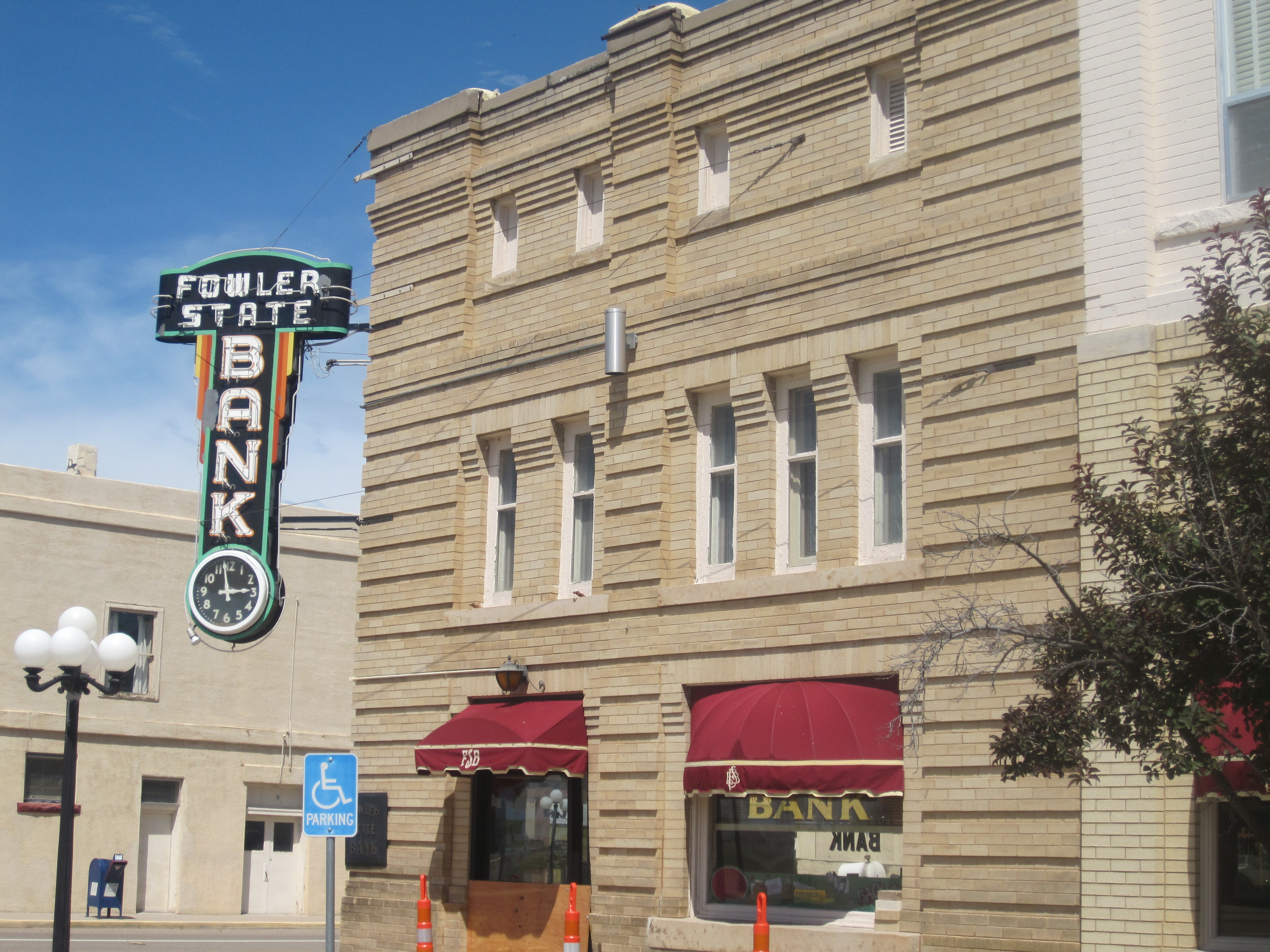
Fowler State Bank building

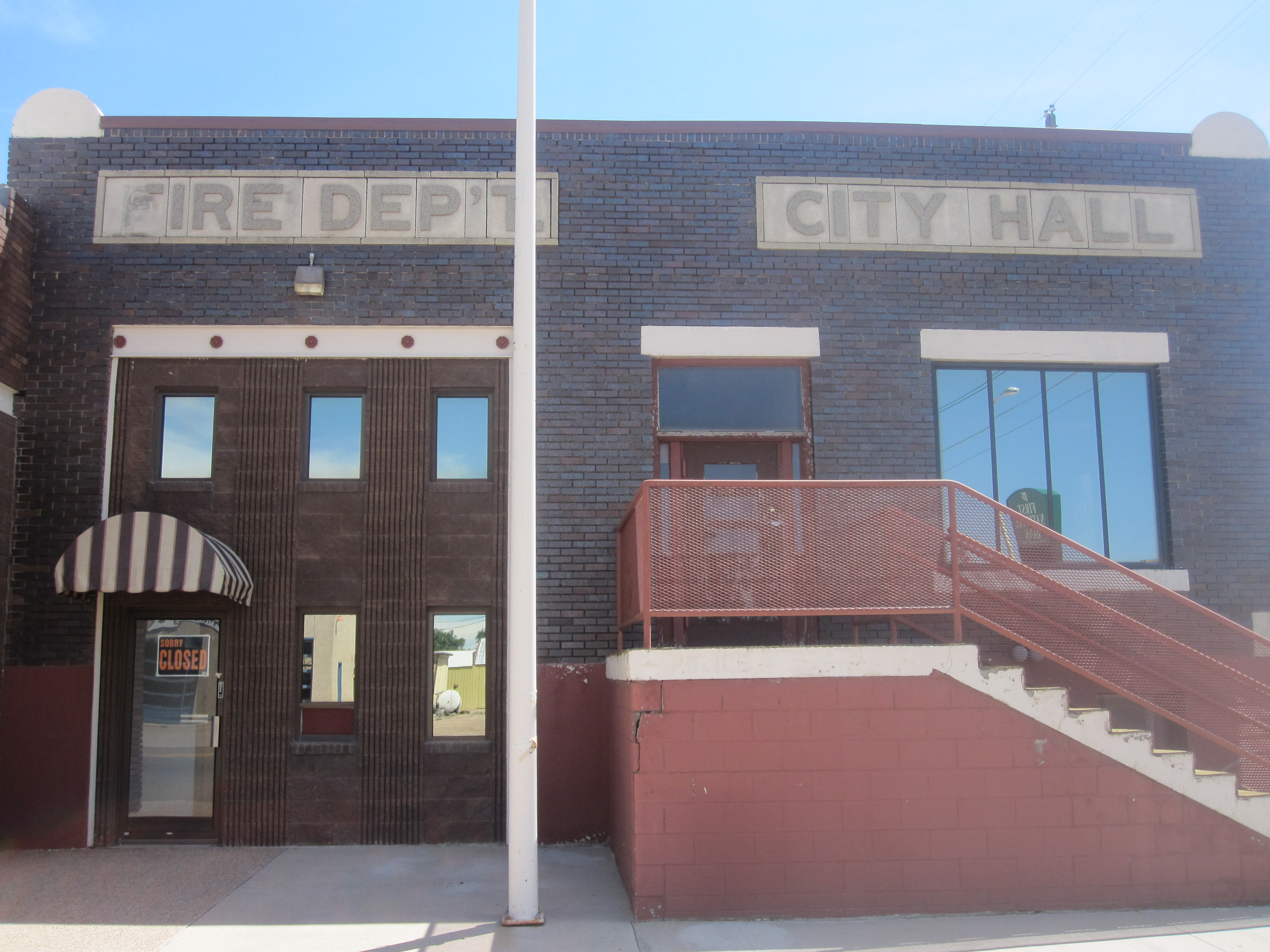
Fowler Fire Department and City Hall on U.S. Highway 50

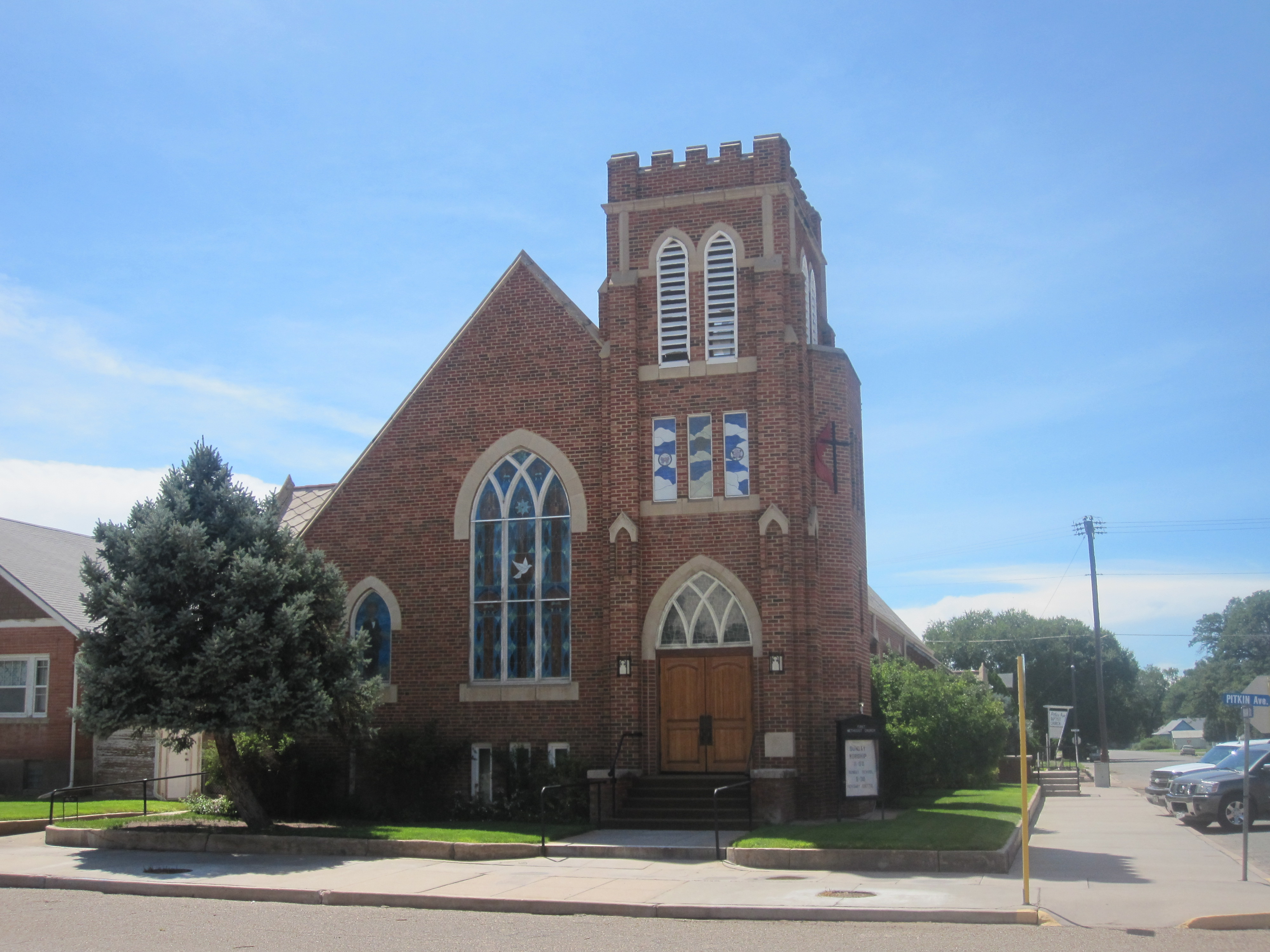
First Methodist Church of Fowler

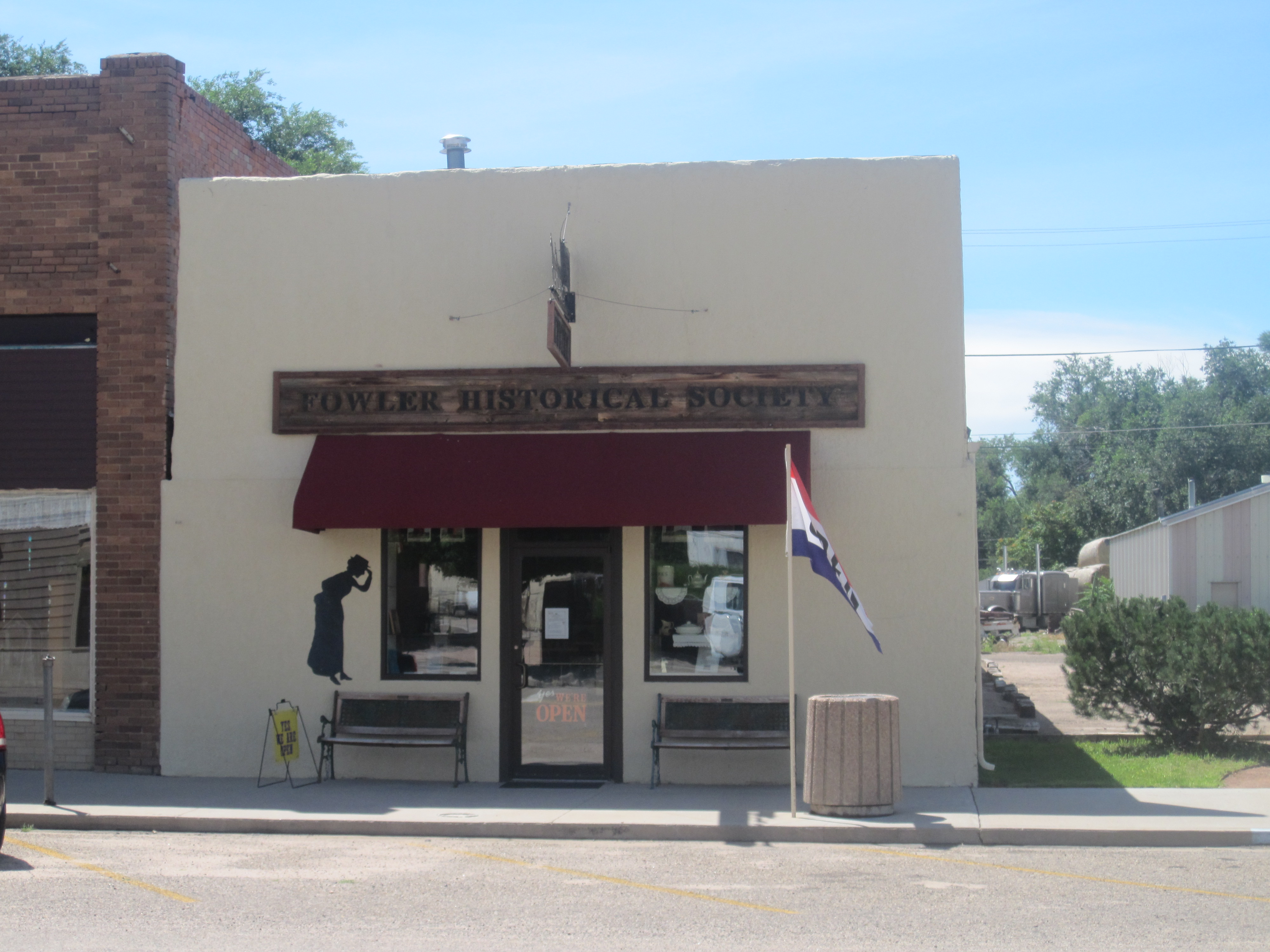
Fowler Historical Society

== See also ==
- List of municipalities in Colorado
