= United States Post Office (Richfield Springs, New York) =

- US Post Office--Richfield Springs
- U.S. National Register of Historic Places
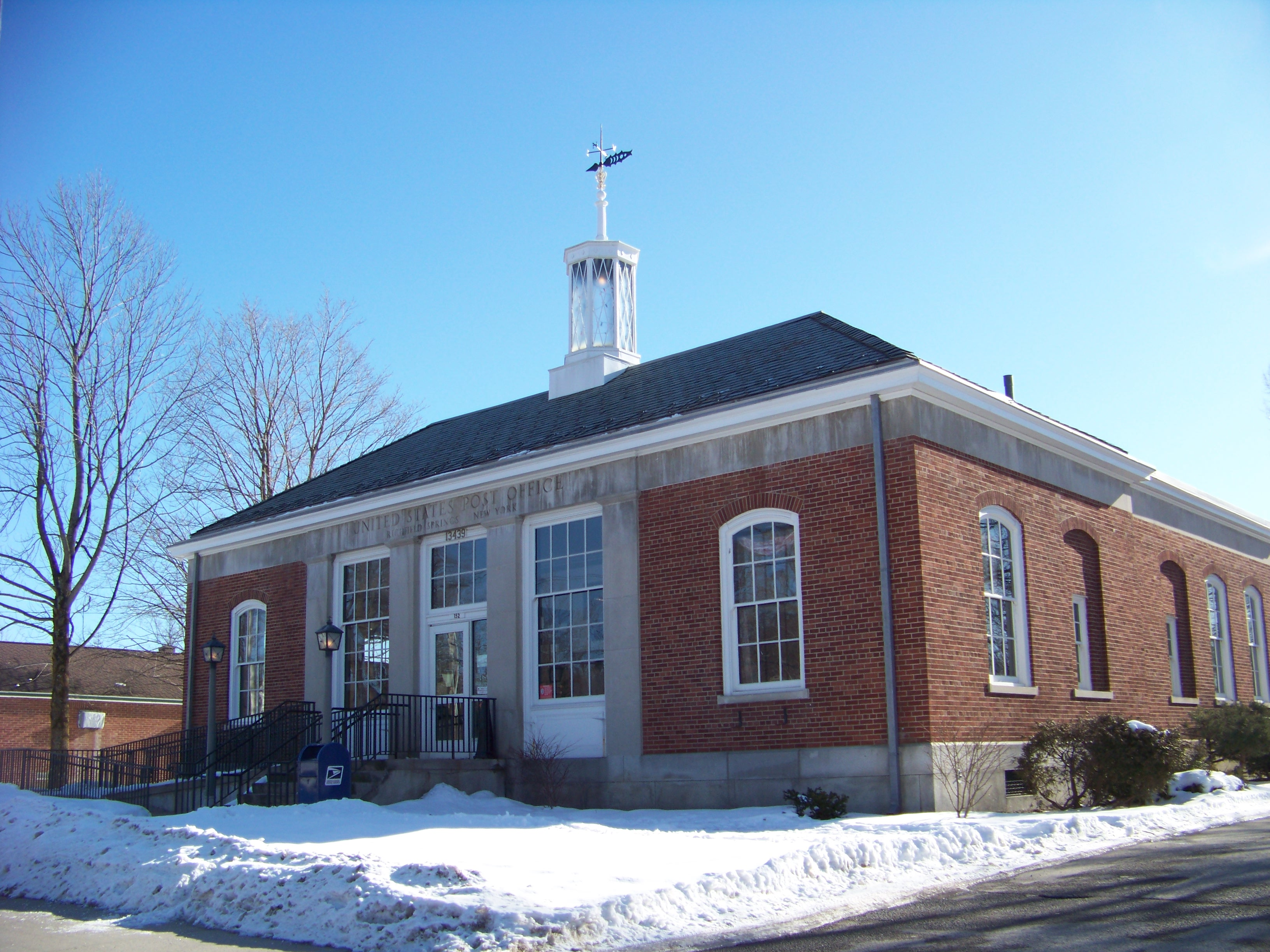

- Location within New York Location within the United States
- Location: 152 Main St., Richfield Springs, New York
- Coordinates: 42.8531°N 74.9844°W
- Area: less than one acre
- Built: 1941
- Architect: Simon, Louis A.; Taylor, John W.
- Architectural style: Colonial Revival
- MPS: US Post Offices in New York State, 1858–1943, TR
- NRHP reference No.: 88002422
- Added to NRHP: May 11, 1989

US Post Office-Richfield Springs is a historic post office building located at Richfield Springs in Otsego County, New York, United States. It was built in 1941–1942, and is one of a number of post offices in New York State designed by the Office of the Supervising Architect of the Treasury Department, Louis A. Simon.

It is one story, five bay building with a granite clad foundation, brick facades laid in common bond and limestone trim. The roof is surmounted by an octagonal cupola with metal window tracery and a decorative iron weathervane. The building displays Colonial Revival style details. The interior features an untitled 1942 mural by artist John W. Taylor depicting a local landscape. It is located within the East Main Street Historic District.

It was listed on the National Register of Historic Places in 1989.
