= East Main Street Historic District (Richfield Springs, New York) =

Historic district in New York, United States

- U.S. National Register of Historic Places
- U.S. Historic district
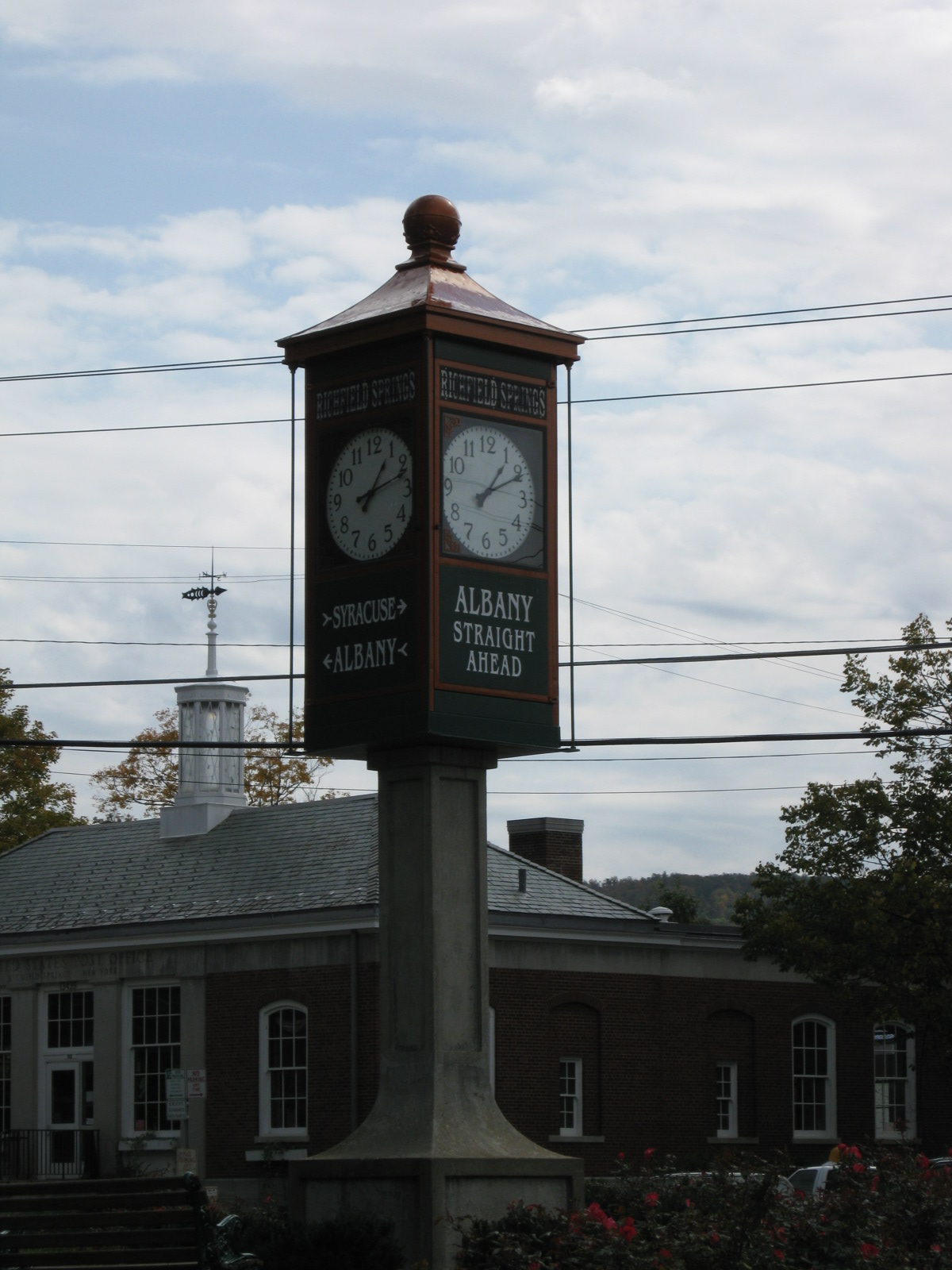
- Spring Park Post Clock, October 2009

- Location within New York Location within the United States
- Location: Roughly, E. Main St. from Church St. to the Richfield Springs reservoirs, Richfield Springs, New York
- Coordinates: 43°8′52″N 74°58′14″W
- Area: 80 acres (32 ha)
- Architect: Niver, W.; et al.
- Architectural style: Mid 19th Century Revival, Late Victorian, Late 19th And 20th Century Revivals
- NRHP reference No.: 95001282
- Added to NRHP: November 7, 1995

East Main Street Historic District is a national historic district located at Richfield Springs in Otsego County, New York. It encompasses 57 contributing buildings, one contributing site, eight contributing structures, and one contributing object. The body of the district includes 33 historic residences, two historic boarding houses, a theatre, post office, a former hotel, and a church. Spring Park includes a contributing post clock (1918), set of semi-circular limestone steps (c. 1875), bandstand (1904), and cobblestone fountain (1931). Located within the district boundaries is the U.S. Post Office building.

It was listed on the National Register of Historic Places in 1997.

== Gallery ==
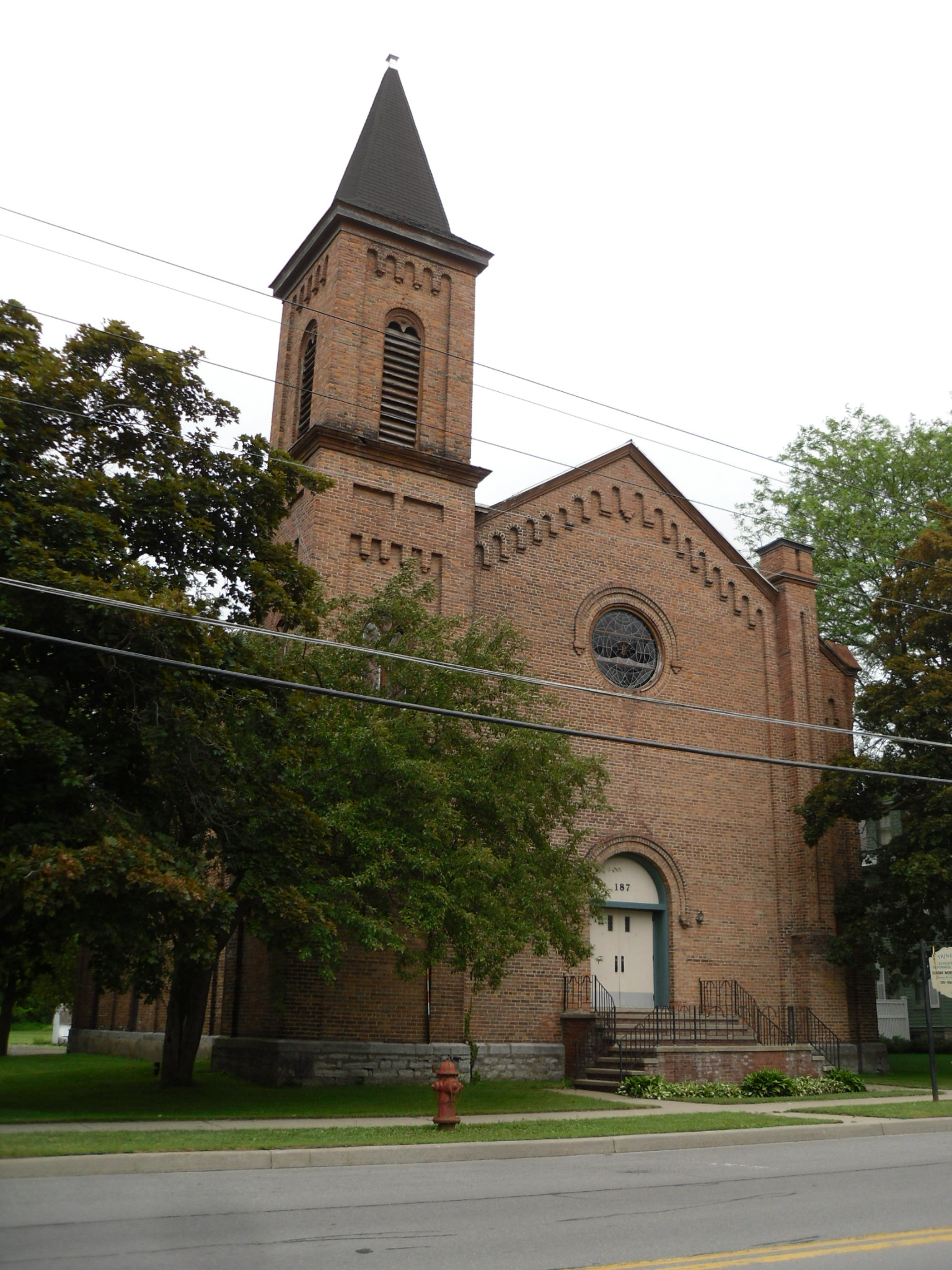
Trinity Methodist Church, June 2010
