= Church Street Historic District (Richfield Springs, New York) =

Historic district in New York, United States

- U.S. National Register of Historic Places
- U.S. Historic district
- Location within New York Location within the United States
- Location: Roughly bounded by Church, Sylvan, Gould, and Warren Sts., Richfield Springs, New York
- Coordinates: 42°51′21″N 74°59′2″W
- Area: 37 acres (15 ha)
- Built: 1822
- Architect: multiple
- Architectural style: Queen Anne
- NRHP reference No.: 97000532
- Added to NRHP: June 04, 1997

Church Street Historic District is a national historic district located at Richfield Springs in Otsego County, New York. It encompasses 76 contributing buildings, one contributing site, and one contributing object. It consists of a middle class residential area developed between about 1822 and 1940 and primarily characterized by two story frame houses in a variety of popular 19th- and early 20th-century architectural styles.

It was listed on the National Register of Historic Places in 1997.
