= Deowongo Island =

Island

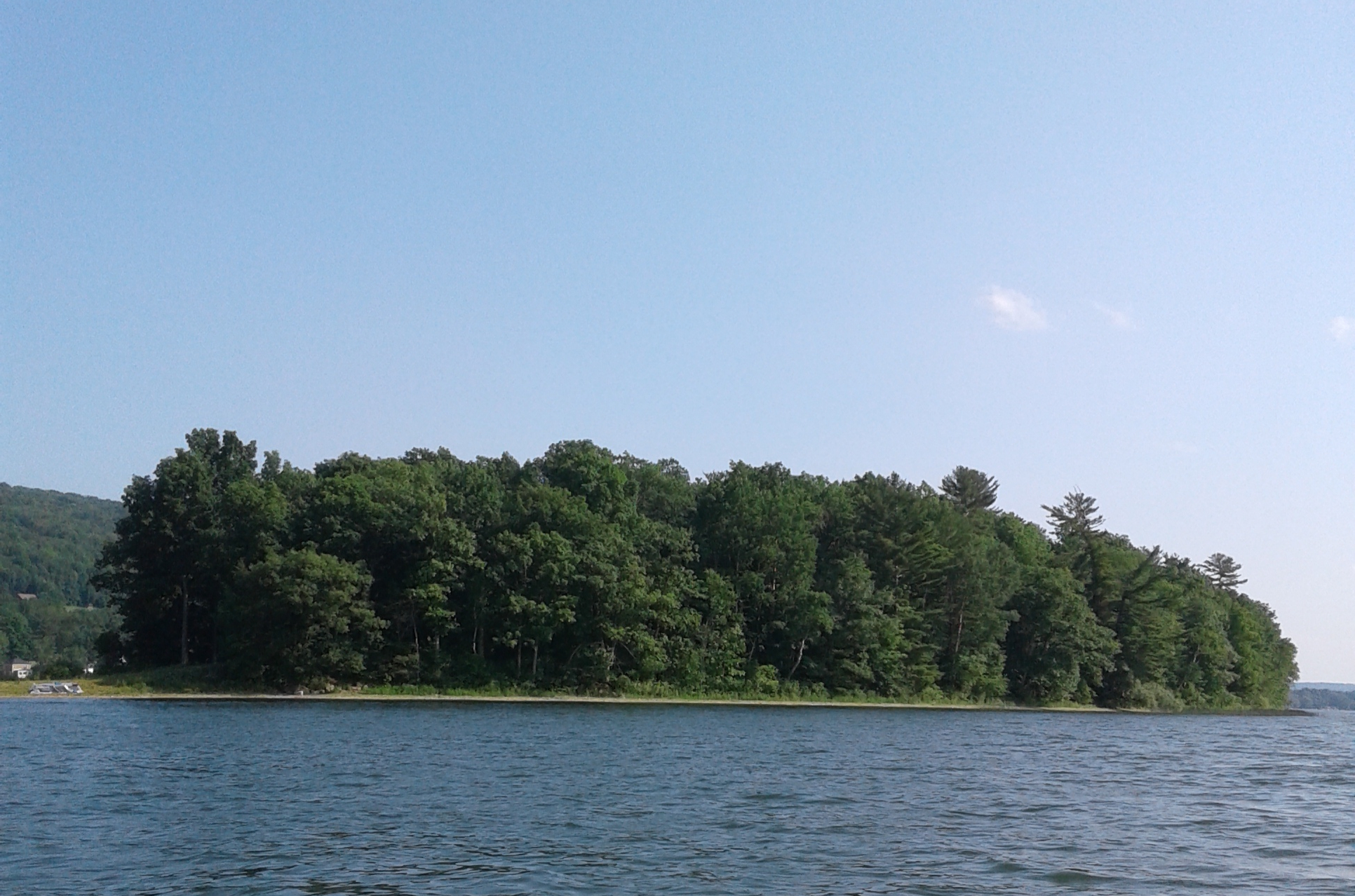
- West side of Deowongo Island in summer 2018

- Location within New York

Geography
- Location: Canadarago Lake
- Coordinates: 42°48′58″N 74°59′56″W, 42°48′54″N 75°00′00″W
- Highest elevation: 1,302 ft (396.8 m)

Administration
- United States
- State: New York
- County: Otsego
- Towns: Otsego, Richfield

Deowongo Island is the only remaining island on Canadarago Lake in Otsego County, New York. The island's name is said to mean, "place of hearing", coming from the Oneida Iroquois nation’s language, and was given to the island because of the echo that was noticeable from that body of land before trees were cut around the shores. The island was protected in October 2012 and is currently open for public access.
