= West Main Street–West James Street Historic District =

Historic house in New York, United States

- U.S. National Register of Historic Places
- U.S. Historic district
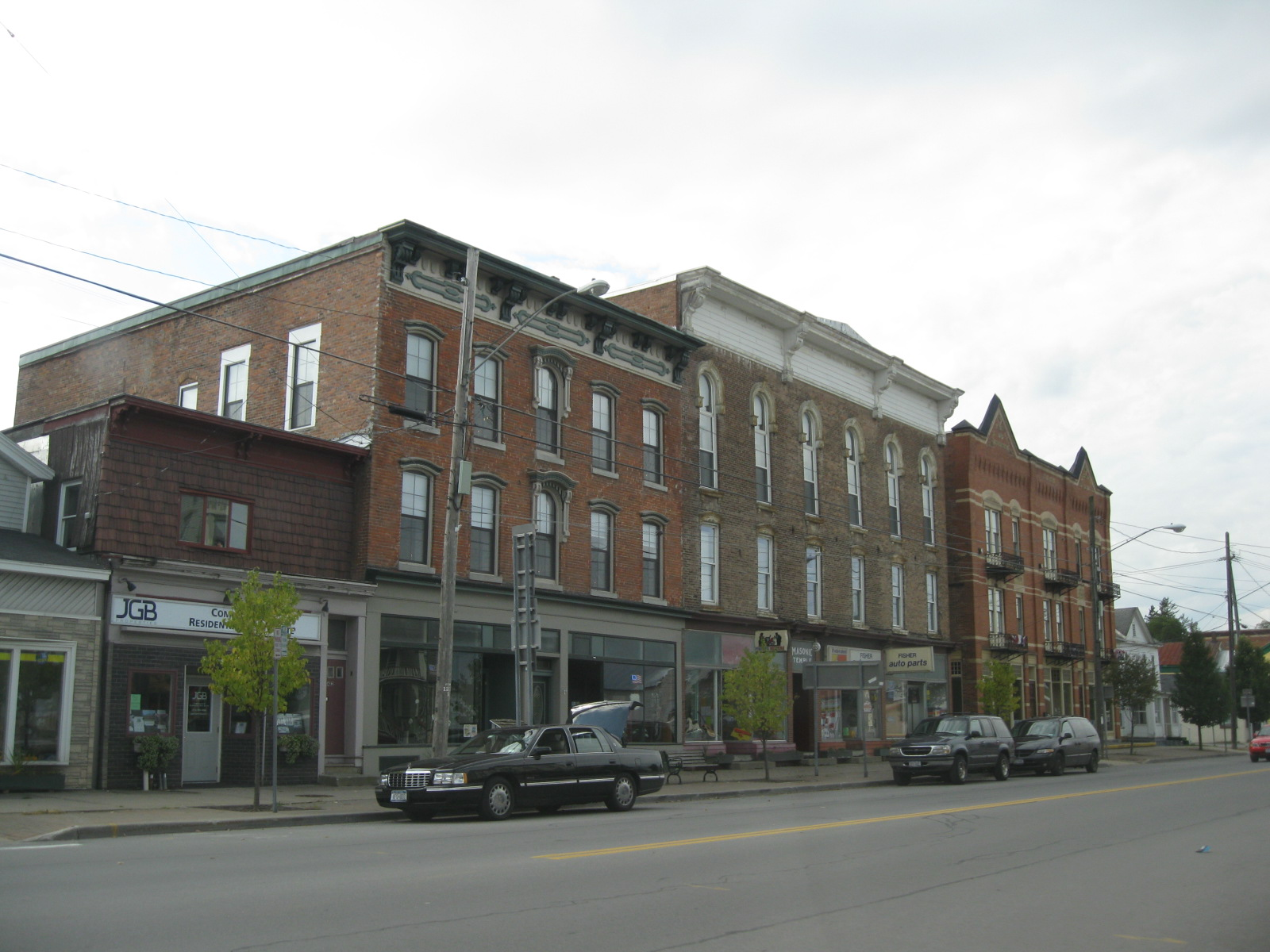
- West Main Street–West James Street Historic District, October 2009

- Location within New York Location within the United States
- Location: Roughly, along W. Main, W. James, Elm and Center Sts. and Taylor Ave., Richfield Springs, New York
- Coordinates: 42°51′12″N 74°59′19″W
- Area: 24 acres (9.7 ha)
- Architect: Dudley, Henry; Jordan, Myron
- Architectural style: Late 19th And 20th Century Revivals, Late Victorian, Mid 19th Century Revival
- NRHP reference No.: 94000257
- Added to NRHP: March 17, 1994

West Main Street–West James Street Historic District is a national historic district located at Richfield Springs in Otsego County, New York. It encompasses 58 contributing buildings and three eight contributing structures. The body of the district includes 21 businesses and 29 historic residences, a school, library, and a church complex. The district incorporates the historic institutional and commercial core of the village and a significant residential neighborhood.

It was listed on the National Register of Historic Places in 1994.
