= Lemuel F. Vibber House =

Historic house in New York, United States

- U.S. National Register of Historic Places
- Location within New York Location within the United States
- Location: 302 Butternut Road, Federal Corners, New York
- Coordinates: 42°50′32″N 74°58′26″W
- Area: 6.11 acres (2.47 ha)
- Built: ca. 1810
- Architectural style: Federal
- NRHP reference No.: 16000393
- Added to NRHP: June 21, 2016

Lemuel F. Vibber House is a historic home located east of the Village of Richfield Springs, New York by Federal Corners, New York. It was built ca. 1810 by Lemuel F. Vibber. The main block of the Vibber House is a side-gabled, two-story, five-bay building on a high stone foundation enclosing a full-height basement built in the Federal style.

It was added to the National Register of Historic Places in 2016.
