= Sunset Hill (Warren, New York) =

Historic house in New York, United States

- U.S. National Register of Historic Places
- Location within New York Location within the United States
- Nearest city: Richfield Springs, New York
- Coordinates: 42°51′29″N 74°58′41″W
- Area: 12.4 acres (5.0 ha)
- Built: 1923
- Architect: Baum, Dwight James
- Architectural style: Colonial Revival
- NRHP reference No.: 06001205
- Added to NRHP: January 4, 2007

Sunset Hill, also known as Mrs. Eugene D. Stocker Estate, is a historic home complex located just north of the Village of Richfield Springs in the Town of Warren in Herkimer County, New York. It includes a main house, guest house, equipment barn, stable, stone entrance gate, swimming pool, and garden. The main house was built in 1923 and is a two-story, gable roofed, wood frame Colonial Revival style building sheathed in clapboard siding with a wood shingle roof. It features a tall portico with square columns and a triangular pediment. The complex was designed by Dwight James Baum (1886–1939) as a seasonal estate for Mrs. Eugene D. Stocker.

It was listed on the National Register of Historic Places in 2007.
