= Canadarago Lake =

Lake in Otsego County, New York, U.S.

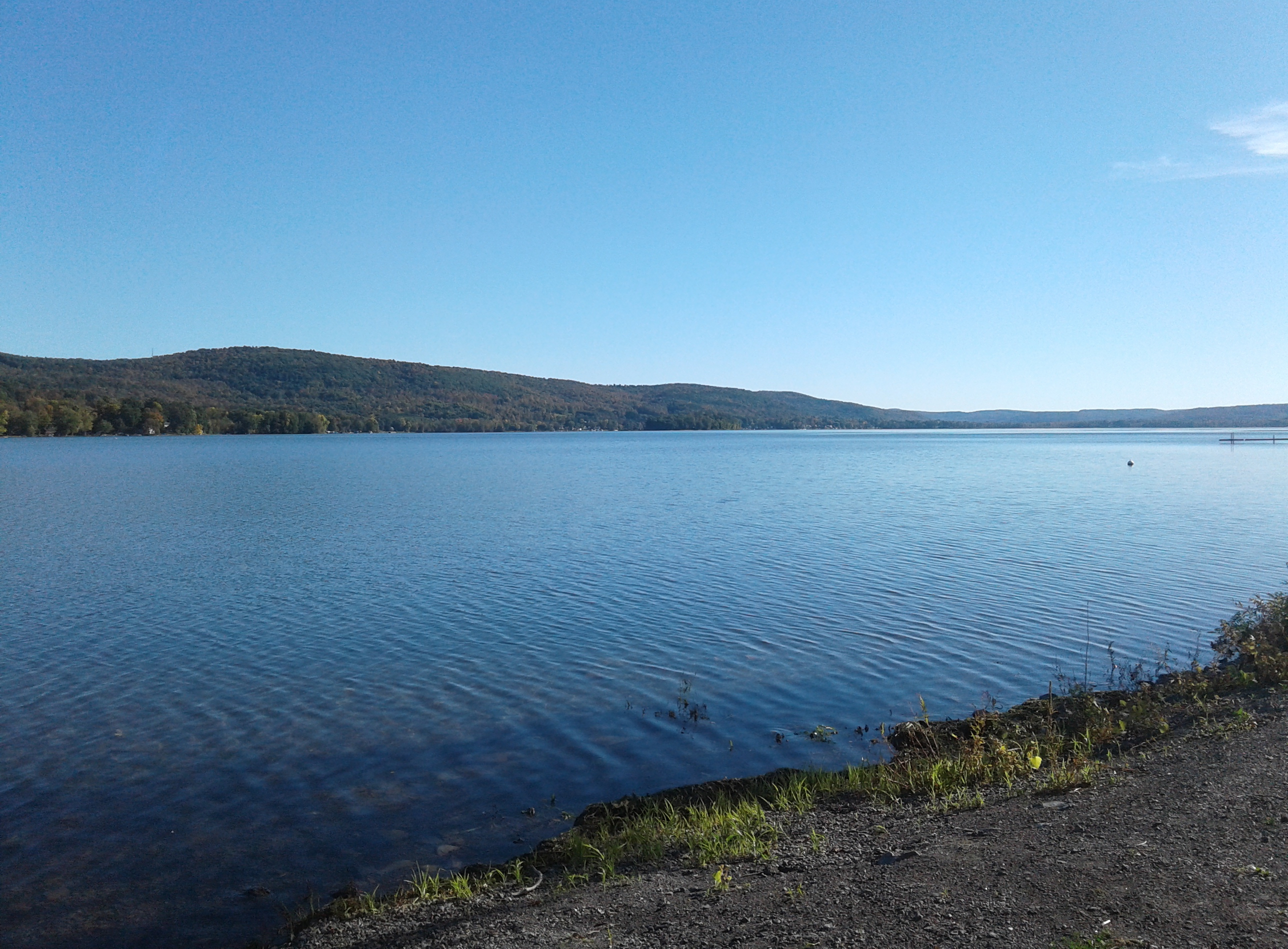
- View of Lake from Elm Street Ext, looking south

- Location within New York Canadarago Lake (the United States)
- Location: Otsego County, New York
- Coordinates: 42°48′55″N 75°00′22″W
- Type: Lake
- Primary inflows: Ocquionis Creek, Mink Creek, Hyder Creek, Herkimer Creek
- Primary outflows: Oaks Creek
- Catchment area: 67.34 mi^{2} (174.4 km^{2})
- Basin countries: United States
- Max. length: 4.04 mi (6.50 km)
- Max. width: 1.38 mi (2.22 km)
- Surface area: 1,917 acres (7.76 km^{2})
- Average depth: 24.75 ft (7.54 m)
- Max. depth: 44 feet (13 m)
- Water volume: 15,600,000,000 US gal (59,000,000 m^{3})
- Shore length^{1}: 10 miles (16 km)
- Surface elevation: 1,280 feet (390 m)
- Islands: 2 Deowongo Island, Loon Island (sunken)
- Settlements: Richfield Springs, Schuyler Lake
- ^{1} Shore length is not a well-defined measure.

Canadarago Lake is a 1,917-acre (7.76 km^{2}) lake located in Otsego County, New York and is the source of Oaks Creek. The Village of Richfield Springs is located at the lake's northern end. It is the second largest lake in Otsego County, lying to the west of and parallel to the larger Otsego Lake. The lake's name is also spelled "Candajarago Lake" or "Caniadaraga Lake".

The lake has two islands. One island is known as Deowongo Island. The island's name is said to mean, "Place of Hearing", coming from the Oneida Iroquois nation’s language, and was given to the island because of the echo that was noticeable from that body of land. The island was protected in October 2012 and is currently open for public access. The other island is Loon Island which is a sunken island that disappeared in the early 19th century.

== Geography ==
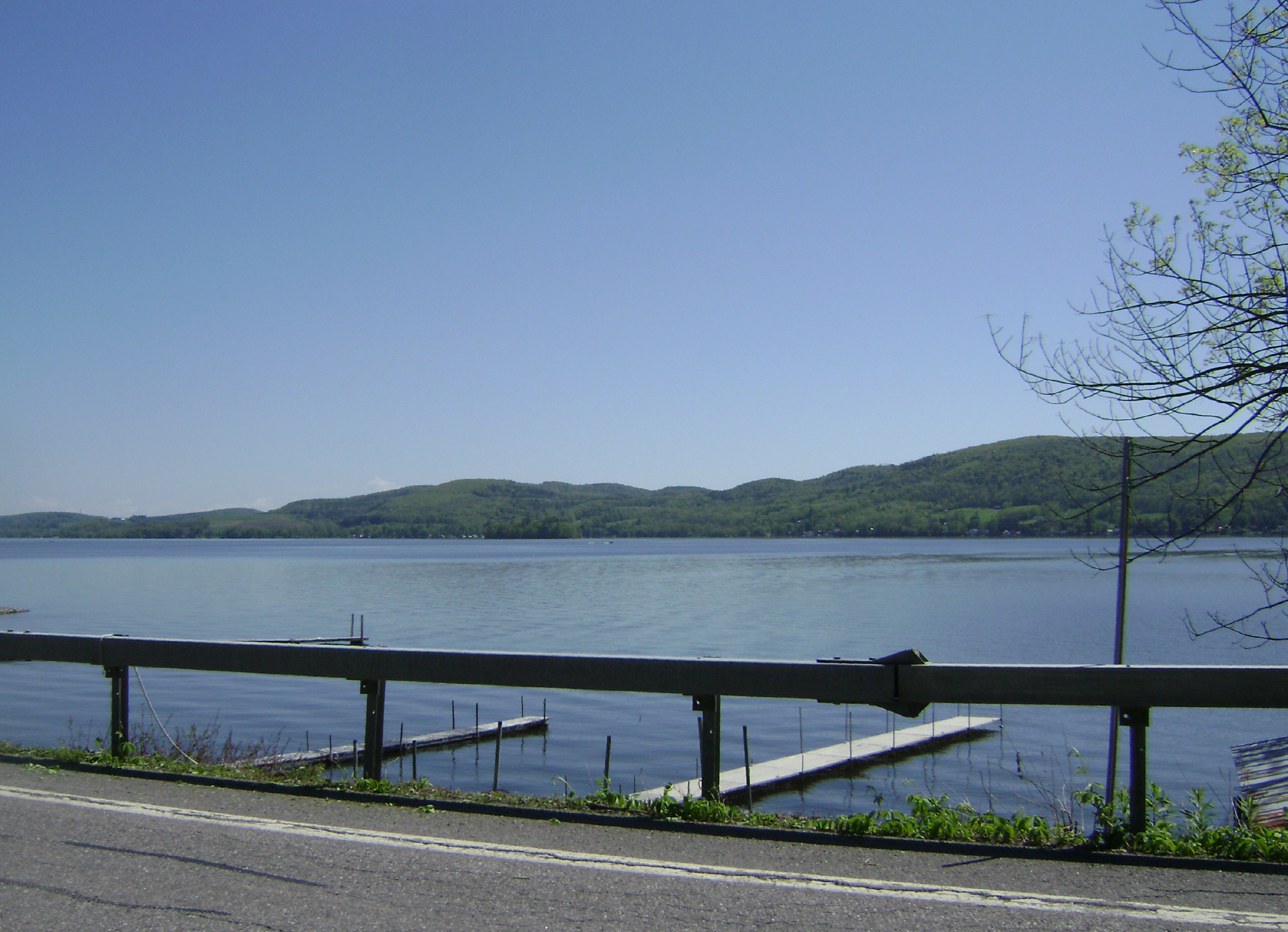
Canadarago Lake seen from NY 28

Canadarago Lake is just over four miles (6.4 km) long with a surface area of 1,917 acres (7.76 km^{2}). Its average depth is 24.75 feet (7.54 m), with a maximum depth of 44 feet (13 m). The northern end of the lake is in the Town of Richfield, and the southern end is in the Town of Otsego and bordered by the Town of Exeter on the west. The lake runs from the Village of Richfield Springs at the north end to the community of Schuyler Lake at the south end. The lake has historically also been known as Schuyler Lake, and the community mentioned earlier still bears this name.

=== Islands ===
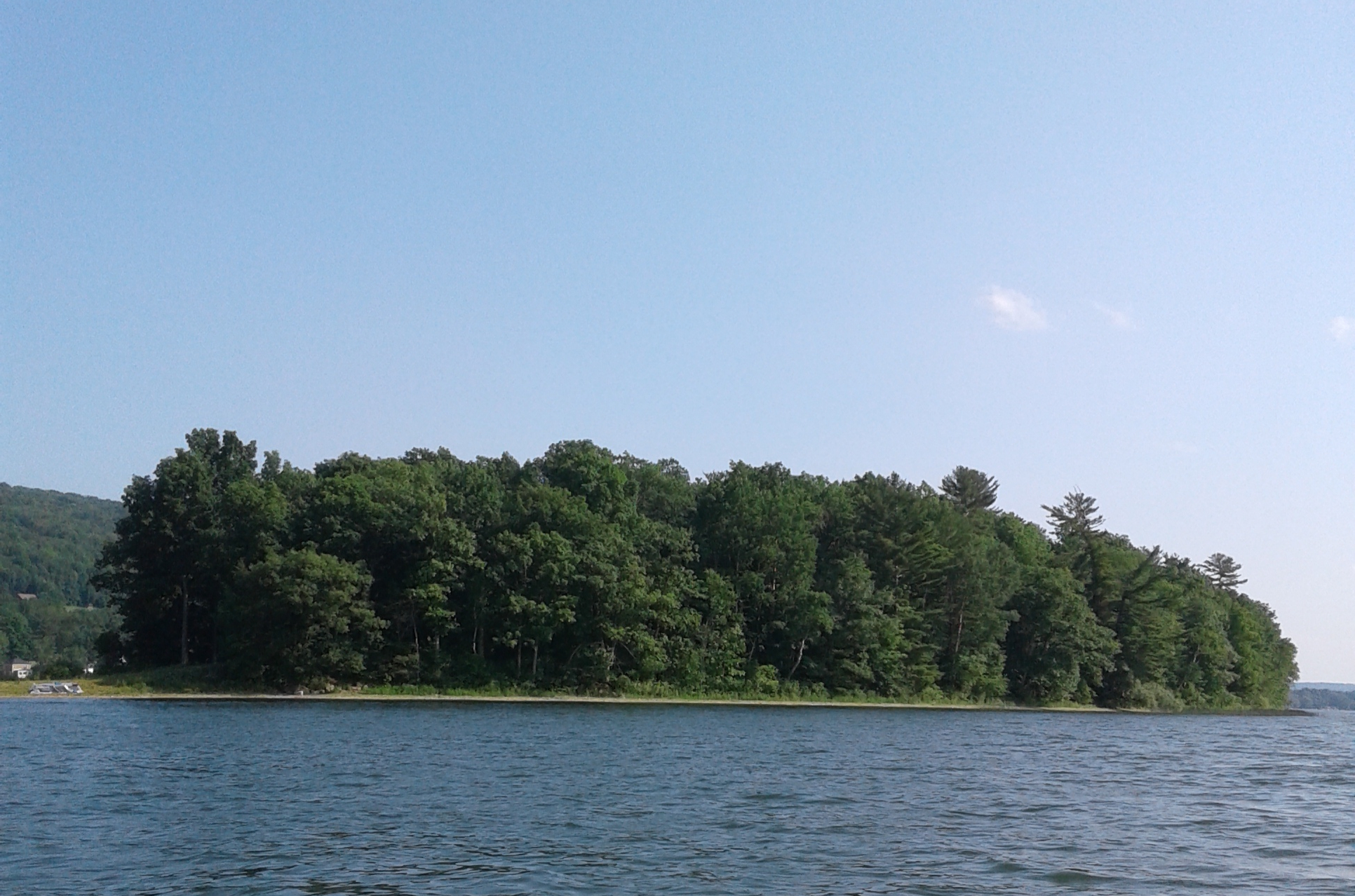
Deowongo Island in summer 2018

There is a small island near the eastern shore called Deowongo Island. There is a sunken island on Canadarago Lake called Loon Island. This island was less than an acre and stood toward the north end of the lake toward the northwest side, near the Baker's Beach area.

=== Adjacent mountains ===
One mountain near the lake is Nine Hill, which is located on the northwest side of the lake. King Hill is located on the east side of the lake. South of King Hill is Panther Mountain.

== History ==
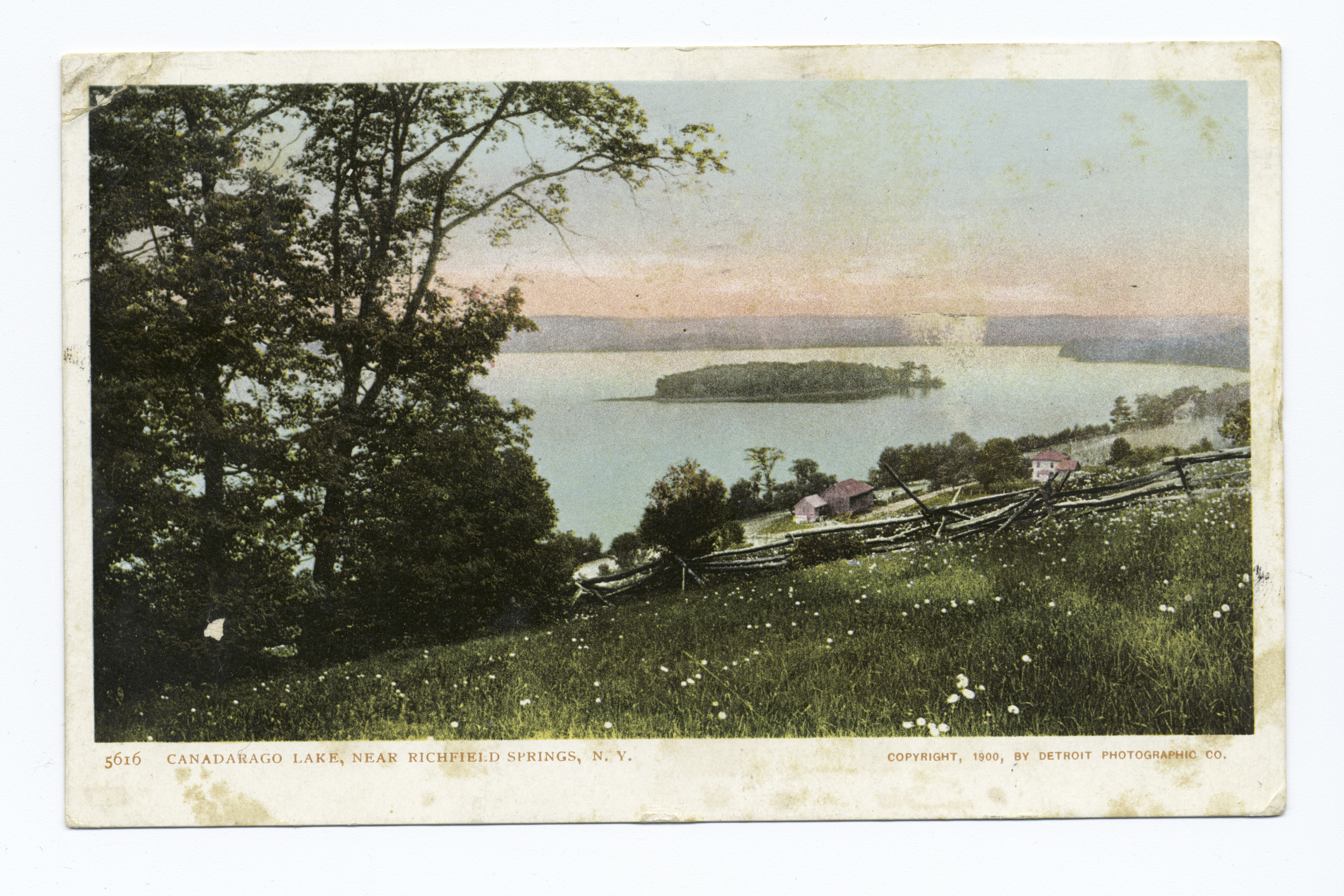
1900 post card of the lake

In 1778, there was an event known as the Andrustown Massacre during the American Revolutionary War near Canadarago Lake. There is a marker south of Hendersonville on the road to the lake known as the “Leatherstocking Trail”, which is a reminder of this massacre.

Until the early part of the 19th century, there was a second island on the lake called Loon Island. Smaller than the island that remains on Canadarago today, Loon Island was only half an acre in size. Its southern shore was marshy, but the northern end of the island (toward Richfield Springs) had trees and vegetation. In 1816..."the year without a summer", there was an early spring thaw and the streams that feed Canadarago were running high. Their water flow covered the lake ice. A north wind blew the ice pack into the southern portion of the lake. Not long after that, there was a hard freeze and the winds shifted from out of the south. The ice pack, larger than before, was sent back in the opposite direction. The saw effect took off the surface soil of the island and took down the trees and vegetation. It has been under water ever since.

In 1872, a small steamboat was launched on the lake as a pleasure craft.

The remaining island on Canadarago was called Deowongo Island (De-O-Won-Go) by the Oneida Indians who lived in the area. The name is said to mean, "Place of Hearing", and was given to the island because of the echo that was noticeable from that body of land. The island was purchased from the State of New York by Daniel Wormer in 1850. Then in 2012 the island was donated by the Schoenlein family to the Otsego Land Trust making it accessible by the public.

In 1902, the Southern New York Railroad, an electric railroad, was opened south of Herkimer and Mohawk to Jordanville, Richfield Springs, Canadarago Lake, Cooperstown and Oneonta. There were two stops along the lake including Canadarago Park and The Lake House. Canadarago Park was located on the east shore about a mile south of The Lake House.

June 2006 saw massive flooding of its banks after record rainfall. Legislation to create a Canadarago Lake District was approved by the New York State Legislature in 2007 but was subsequently vetoed by Governor Eliot Spitzer.

== Geology ==
It is geologically related to the Finger Lakes, as they were both carved by glaciers, but is not counted among them. One difference is that Canadarago Lake is situated at a higher elevation (1,266 feet [386 m]) than the Finger Lakes (approximately 400 feet [122 m]). Another difference is the Finger Lakes are part of the Lake Ontario watershed, and Otsego is part of the Susquehanna River watershed.

Canadarago Lake is a dimictic lake surviving a previous glacial period. The lake is also eutrophic.

== Watershed ==
Canadarago Lake watershed

Ocquionis Creek and Mink Creek feed into the lake from the north, and Hyder Creek feeds into the lake from the west as well as Herkimer Creek, which enters the lake close to where Oaks Creek drains the lake. Oaks Creek drains to the south through a bog, and then flows southward for roughly 9 miles (14 km) before flowing into the Susquehanna River.

The Canadarago Lake watershed covers approximately 67 square miles (170 km^{2}). It includes parts of the towns of Otsego, Springfield, Richfield, Exeter in Otsego County and towns of Columbia and Warren in Herkimer County. It is the headwaters of the 27,510-square-mile (71,300 km^{2}) drainage basin of the Susquehanna River which runs from Otsego Lake in Cooperstown to Havre de Grace where it flows into the Chesapeake Bay of the Atlantic Ocean.

== Conservation and management ==
=== Invasive species ===
Zebra mussels were first introduced into the Great Lakes in the mid- to late-1980s from ballast discharged from freighters originating in the Black and Caspian Sea region of eastern Europe and western Asia. They first became established in Canadarago Lake since around 2000. They can outcompete and kill native unionid clams. They also disrupt the food web, destroy shoreline infrastructure and swimming areas. In Canadarago Lake, they are of particular concern due to the relatively large areas of suitable habitat, which increase their impact the lake.

=== Pollution ===
Incompletely treated sewage from Richfield Springs was historically dumped into Oquionis Creek and then flowed into the lake which caused algae blooms. Then in 1973, tertiary treatment was started which involved phosphorus removal by alum precipitation. Improvements were seen within a few years.

== Recreation ==
=== Fishing ===
One of the lake’s biggest attractions is fishing. There are many species of fish in the lake including alewife, chain pickerel, common carp, cutlip minnow, golden shiner, satinfin shiner, bridle shiner, common shiner, blackchin shiner, spottail shiner, bluntnose minnow, eastern blacknose dace, longnose dace, rudd, creek chub, fallfish, pearl dace, white sucker, creek chubsucker, shorthead redhorse, yellow bullhead, brown bullhead, banded killifish, rock bass, redbreast sunfish, pumpkinseed, bluegill, black crappie and tessellated darter, with tiger muskie, smallmouth bass, largemouth bass, black bass, yellow perch, walleye, and brown trout being the most popular to fish. The lake is accessed by a State-owned hard-surface boat launch on the west side off State Route 28. The lake’s Walleye population is being supplemented with approximately 40,000 Walleyes four to five inches in length (NYS Department of Environmental Conservation). They are being supplemented annually through 2016, where they will be re-evaluated and most likely stocked once every two to three years. During the summer, there are multiple bass tournaments to show off who can catch the most impressive sized bass. Ice fishing is also permitted during the winter months.

There are different regulations for fishing on the lake including a catch limit and season. Black Bass season goes from December 1 to the third Saturday in June and there is a limit of 5 fish per day. The walleye season goes from the first Saturday in May to March 15. In 2017, the walleye harvest limit was raised from the statewide regulation to 18 inches (46 cm) minimum size and 3 per day, as opposed to a 15 inches (38 cm) minimum size and 5 per day in most other New York lakes. The special regulation will be kept for walleye until number of age 3 is improved. As for Yellow Perch, the season is open all year and a limit of 25 per day, as opposed to a limit of 50 on most other New York lakes.

=== Public swimming areas ===
Baker's Beach is a public picnic area that is open 11am to 7pm from July 4 through August 30, with swimming permitted when a lifeguard is on duty. It is located on the northwest side of the lake, accessed by State Route 28.
