= Fowler School District =

School district in Colorado, United States

Address
- 601 West Grant Avenue Fowler, Colorado, 81039; United States
- Coordinates: 38°7′34″N 104°1′50″W

District information
- Type: Unified school district
- Grades: K–12
- Established: 1961; 65 years ago
- Superintendent: Alfie Lotrich
- Schools: 2
- Budget: $5,944,000
- NCES District ID: 0804110

Students and staff
- Enrollment: 355 (2023–24)
- Teachers: 34.92 (on an FTE basis)
- Student–teacher ratio: 10.17
- District mascot: Grizzly bear
- Colors: Purple and Gold

Other information
- Website: www.fowler.k12.co.us

Fowler School District, officially Fowler School District No. R4j, is a school district headquartered in Fowler, Colorado. It operates two schools: Fowler Elementary School and Fowler Jr./Sr. High School.

It serves students in northwestern Otero County and a small section of Pueblo County.

== History ==
Education in the Fowler area dates back to 1887, when the first documented school met about a mile southeast of the center of town with Miss Grace Fenlason as teacher. A school board was established around 1889. Fowler voters approved a bond to build a permanent schoolhouse in 1901. Fowler School District 26 was organized in 1903, the same year that the high school saw its first graduate. By 1906, students were being educated at the school in Fowler and a schoolhouse in Omer.

A reorganization in 1961 created Fowler School District R4j and brought in superintendent Larry Vibber, who had been the superintendent in nearby Sugar City prior to Crowley County school districts being reorganized and consolidated. A new high school was constructed in 1964.

=== Superintendents ===
- Jearl Nunnelee
- Larry Vibber (1962–2009)
- Steve Grasmick
- Alfie Lotrich (2017–)

== Extracurricular activities ==
The Fowler Grizzlies compete in Colorado High School Activities Association sports in the 2A classification and 8-man football. Brent Van Hee is among the 29 four-time state wrestling champions in Colorado with titles won from 1983 to 1986.
