= Schuyler Lake, New York =

- Hamlet and CDP
- Location within the state of New York Schuyler Lake, New York (the United States)
- Coordinates: 42°46′49″N 75°01′41″W
- Country: United States
- State: New York
- County: Otsego
- Town: Exeter

Area
  - Total: 3.24 sq mi (8.38 km^{2})
- Elevation: 1,309 ft (399 m)
- Time zone: UTC-5 (Eastern (EST))
  - Summer (DST): UTC-4 (EDT)
- ZIP code: 13457
- Area code: 607

Schuyler Lake is the name of a small hamlet (and census-designated place) in the town of Exeter in Otsego County, New York, United States. As of the 2020 census, Schuyler Lake had a population of 189. It lies at the south end of Canadarago Lake and south of Richfield Springs. It is also known as Kaniatarake, which is a Mohawk name that translates to "on the lake".

New York State Route 28 and Otsego County Route 22 intersect in the center of the hamlet. Schuyler Lake is the location of the infamous Battle of the Four Corners, so named because of the hamlet's geographical location at the crossroads of State Highway 28 and County Highway 22.

== History ==
The hamlet was once served by the Southern New York Railroad, an electric trolley line that ran from Oneonta to Mohawk.
