= Richfield, New York =

Town in Otsego County, New York, US

- Town
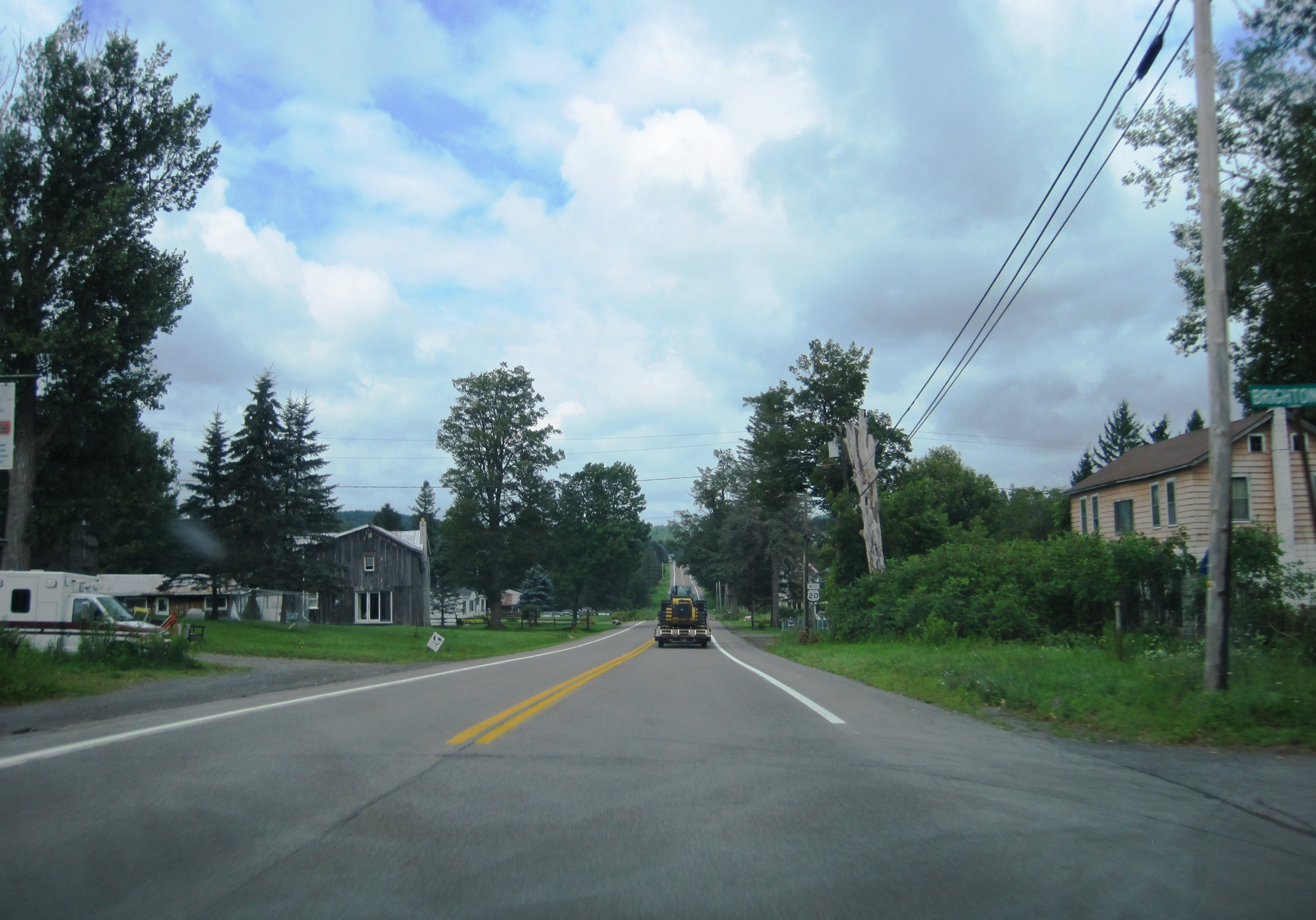
- US 20 westbound in the Richfield hamlet of Brighton Corners

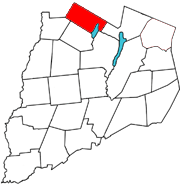
- Otsego County map with the Town of Richfield in red
- Coordinates: 42°51′19″N 75°1′9″W
- Country: United States
- State: New York
- County: Otsego

Area
  - Total: 32.46 sq mi (84.06 km^{2})
  - Land: 30.86 sq mi (79.92 km^{2})
  - Water: 1.60 sq mi (4.14 km^{2})
- Elevation: 1,470 ft (448 m)

Population (2020)
  - Total: 2,065
  - Density: 66.9/sq mi (25.84/km^{2})
- Time zone: UTC-5 (Eastern (EST))
  - Summer (DST): UTC-4 (EDT)
- ZIP code: 13439
- Area code: 315
- FIPS code: 36-61467
- GNIS feature ID: 0979417
- Website: www.townofrichfieldny.com

Richfield is a town located in Otsego County, New York, United States. As of the 2020 census, the town had a population of 2,065. The Town of Richfield is located at the northern border of the county.

== History ==
Richfield Springs was called "Big Medicine Waters" by the local natives.

From the Gazetteer of the State of New York by J. H. French, published by R. Pearsall Smith, Syracuse, N. Y. 1860:

Richfield was formed from the Town of Otsego, New York on April 10, 1792. The towns of Exeter and Plainfield were taken off in 1799. It is the extreme northern town of the county. Its surface is rolling and moderately hilly, with a mean elevation of 150 to 200 ft. above Schuyler Lake (now Canadarago Lake), which lies in the southeast corner of the town and occupies a deep valley, into which flow several small streams from the north and west. The soil is of a diversified character, consisting of gravel, slate, clay, and sandy loam, well cultivated and productive. About 500,000 pounds of cheese are made in the town annually, — being more than double that made in any other town in the county. Richfield Springs (p.v.), near the head of Schuyler Lake, in the northeast corner of the town, contains 3 churches, a flouring mill, and 368 inhabitants.^{1} Monticello, (Richfield p.o.,) near the center, contains a church and 139 inhabitants. Mayflower is a post office. Brighton contains about 15 houses. Settlements were made prior to the Revolution; but they were broken up during the war. The first settlers after the war were John Kimball, Richard and Wm. Pray, John Beardsley, Joseph Coats, and Seth Allen, in 1787.^{2} The first church (Prot. E.) was formed at Monticello, May 20, 1799; Rev. Daniel Nash was the first preacher.^{3}

^{1} Richfield Springs — from which the village derives its name — are celebrated for their medicinal properties in the cure of cutaneous disorders and large numbers of invalids are annually attracted here. Professor Reid has given the following as the result of an analysis of a wine gallon of the water of these springs:
- Grains. Bicarbonate of magnesia 20
- Bicarbonate of lime 10
- Chloride of sodium and magnesia 1.05
- Sulphate of magnesia 30
- Hydrosulfate of magnesia and lime 2
- Sulphate of lime 20
- Solid matter 153.05
- Total Grains 236.10
- Sulphurated hydrogen gas, 26.9 inches.

^{2} Willam Tunnicliff, Dan'l Hawks, John Hatch, Ebenezor Eaton, and Jos. Rockwell settled at or near Richfield Springs in 1789; Obadiah Beardsley and his son Obadiah, jr., the father and grandfather of the late Levi Beardsley, and Hon. Samuel Beardsley, of Utica settled near Schuylers Lake in 1790. The first birth was that of Jos. Beardsley; and the first marriage, that of Ebenezer Russell and Mrs. Moore. James S. Palmer taught the first school at Richfield Springs; Israel Rawson kept the first inn, and Cyrus Robinson the first store, at the Springs; William Tunnicliff erected the first mill, at the same place.

^{3} The census reports 7 churches; 3 M. E., 2 Prot. E., Presb., and Univ.

== Geography ==
According to the United States Census Bureau, the town has a total area of 32.5 square miles (84 km^{2}), of which 30.9 square miles (80 km^{2}) is land and 1.6 square miles (4.1 km^{2}) (4.92%) is water.

The northern town line is the border of Herkimer County. The northern end of Canadarago Lake is in the eastern part of the town. Hyder Creek enters the lake from the west. Ocquionis Creek and Mink Creek flow into the lake from the north, passing through Richfield Springs.

New York State Route 28 (NY 28) is a north-south highway passing the western shore of Canadarago Lake. NY 28 intersects US Route 20 at Richfield Springs. NY 167 has its southern terminus at US Route 20 in the center of Richfield Springs.

== Demographics ==
Historical population
Census	Pop.	Note	%±
1820	1,772		—
1830	1,752		−1.1%
1840	1,680		−4.1%
1850	1,502		−10.6%
1860	1,648		9.7%
1870	1,831		11.1%
1880	2,515		37.4%
1890	2,699		7.3%
1900	2,526		−6.4%
1910	2,212		−12.4%
1920	2,133		−3.6%
1930	2,099		−1.6%
1940	1,970		−6.1%
1950	2,339		18.7%
1960	2,662		13.8%
1970	2,602		−2.3%
1980	2,608		0.2%
1990	2,711		3.9%
2000	2,423		−10.6%
2010	2,388		−1.4%
2020	2,065		−13.5%
U.S. Decennial Census

As of the census of 2000, there were 2,423 people, 968 households, and 641 families residing in the town. The population density was 78.4 inhabitants per square mile (30.3/km^{2}). There were 1,296 housing units at an average density of 41.9 per square mile (16.2/km^{2}). The racial makeup of the town was 97.48% White, 0.37% African American, 0.41% Native American, 0.45% Asian, 0.33% Pacific Islander, 0.04% from other races, and 0.91% from two or more races. Hispanic or Latino people of any race were 0.37% of the population.

There were 968 households, out of which 26.9% had children under the age of 18 living with them, 53.6% were married couples living together, 8.5% had a female householder with no husband present, and 33.7% were non-families. 27.4% of all households were made up of individuals, and 14.9% had someone living alone who was 65 years of age or older. The average household size was 2.47 and the average family size was 3.02.

In the town, the population was spread out, with 23.1% under the age of 18, 7.0% from 18 to 24, 23.9% from 25 to 44, 25.1% from 45 to 64, and 20.9% who were 65 years of age or older. The median age was 42 years. For every 100 females, there were 92.3 males. For every 100 females age 18 and over, there were 89.0 males.

The median income for a household in the town was $32,784, and the median income for a family was $41,050. Males had a median income of $29,479 versus $21,518 for females. The per capita income for the town was $16,723. About 9.3% of families and 13.4% of the population were below the poverty line, including 22.0% of those under age 18 and 9.6% of those age 65 or over.

== Communities and locations in Richfield ==
- Brighton (or "Brighton Corners") – A hamlet in the northern part of the town, located on US-20, west of Richfield Springs
- Canadarago Hill – An elevation located in the Village of Richfield. Also referred to as The Round Top.
- Dogtown – A hamlet near the southern town line of Richfield on County Route 24, located on Hyder Creek
- Federal Corners – A location east of Richfield Springs at the corner of Butternut Road and Cemetery Road
- Gunset Hill – An elevation located west of Richfield Springs
- Hawk Hill – An elevation near Dogtown
- Nine Hill – An elevation southwest of Richfield Springs
- Pray Hill – An elevation west of Brighton
- Monticello – A hamlet southwest of Richfield Springs on Country Route 25 at the intersection of County Road 24
- Richfield Hill – An elevation located by the northwestern part of the town. Part of Richfield Hill is in the town of Columbia
- Richfield Springs – The Village of Richfield Springs is in the northeastern section of the town at the junction of US-20 and NY-28, north of Canadarago Lake
- Round Top – An elevation on the western town line. Partly in Herkimer County.
- Sunset Hill – An elevation north of the village of Richfield
