= Exeter, New York =

- Town
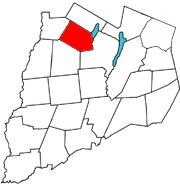
- Otsego County map with the Town of Exeter in red
- Coordinates: 42°47′4″N 75°5′20″W
- Country: United States
- State: New York
- County: Otsego

Area
  - Total: 32.69 sq mi (84.67 km^{2})
  - Land: 32.08 sq mi (83.08 km^{2})
  - Water: 0.61 sq mi (1.59 km^{2})
- Elevation: 1,742 ft (531 m)

Population (2010)
  - Total: 987
  - Estimate (2016): 942
  - Density: 29.4/sq mi (11.34/km^{2})
- Time zone: UTC-5 (Eastern (EST))
  - Summer (DST): UTC-4 (EDT)
- ZIP code: 13315
- Area code: 607
- FIPS code: 36-24845
- GNIS feature ID: 0978948
- Website: townofexeterny.gov

Exeter is a town in Otsego County, New York, United States. The town is located in the northern part of the county. The population was 987 at the 2010 census. It is named after the county town and cathedral city of Exeter in England.

== History ==
The name Exeter derives from the city of Exeter in Devon, England.

John Tunnicliff purchased 12,000 acres (49 km^{2}) of a patent that included the town from David Schuyler and others in 1756, but had to abandon attempts to settle the town until after the French and Indian War.

The first settlements were made around 1769 near Angel Hill. The town was formed from the Town of Richfield in 1799.

== Geography ==
According to the United States Census Bureau, the town has a total area of 32.7 square miles (85 km^{2}), of which 32.1 square miles (83 km^{2}) is land and 0.6 square miles (1.6 km^{2}) (1.75%) is water.

The eastern town line borders, in part, Canadarago Lake. Wharton Creek flows down the western side of the town. Angel Hill is an elevation near the southern town line.

New York State Route 28 is a north-south highway near the eastern town line, and New York State Route 51 is a north-south highway near the western town line.

== Demographics ==
Historical population
Census	Pop.	Note	%±
1820	1,430		—
1830	1,690		18.2%
1840	1,423		−15.8%
1850	1,526		7.2%
1860	1,570		2.9%
1870	1,256		−20.0%
1880	1,353		7.7%
1890	1,245		−8.0%
1900	1,087		−12.7%
1910	1,067		−1.8%
1920	814		−23.7%
1930	691		−15.1%
1940	760		10.0%
1950	924		21.6%
1960	923		−0.1%
1970	996		7.9%
1980	968		−2.8%
1990	967		−0.1%
2000	954		−1.3%
2010	987		3.5%
2016 (est.)	942		−4.6%
U.S. Decennial Census

As of the census of 2000, there were 954 people, 373 households, and 280 families residing in the town. The population density was 29.7 inhabitants per square mile (11.5/km^{2}). There were 542 housing units at an average density of 16.9 per square mile (6.5/km^{2}). The racial makeup of the town was 96.44% White, 1.57% African American, 0.73% Native American, 0.42% Asian, 0.42% from other races, and 0.42% from two or more races. Hispanic or Latino people of any race were 1.15% of the population.

There were 373 households, out of which 31.4% had children under the age of 18 living with them, 62.7% were married couples living together, 9.9% had a female householder with no husband present, and 24.9% were non-families. 20.4% of all households were made up of individuals, and 11.0% had someone living alone who was 65 years of age or older. The average household size was 2.56 and the average family size was 2.94.

In the town, the population was spread out, with 22.9% under the age of 18, 8.3% from 18 to 24, 24.9% from 25 to 44, 29.4% from 45 to 64, and 14.6% who were 65 years of age or older. The median age was 41 years. For every 100 females, there were 100.8 males. For every 100 females age 18 and over, there were 104.4 males.

The median income for a household in the town was $36,607, and the median income for a family was $41,184. Males had a median income of $27,083 versus $20,855 for females. The per capita income for the town was $15,599. About 8.4% of families and 12.3% of the population were below the poverty line, including 20.7% of those under age 18 and 9.9% of those age 65 or over.

== Communities and locations in Exeter ==
- Angel Hill – An elevation near the southern town line
- Brainard Corners – A hamlet west of Exeter hamlet on County Road 22 at the junction of County Road 19
- Exeter (or Exeter Center) – A hamlet located near the center of the town on County Road 22
- Exeter Corner – A location south of Exeter hamlet
- Lidell Corners – A hamlet in the southeastern corner of Exeter on NY-28 at County Road 19
- Pigeon Hill – An elevation south of Exeter Center. Partially in the Town of Burlington
- Schuyler Lake – A hamlet near the eastern town line on NY-28 at County Road 22. Its name is derived from the former name of Canadarago Lake.
- West Exeter – A hamlet located near the western town line on NY-51
