= Richfield Springs, New York =

Village in Otsego County, New York, US

- Village
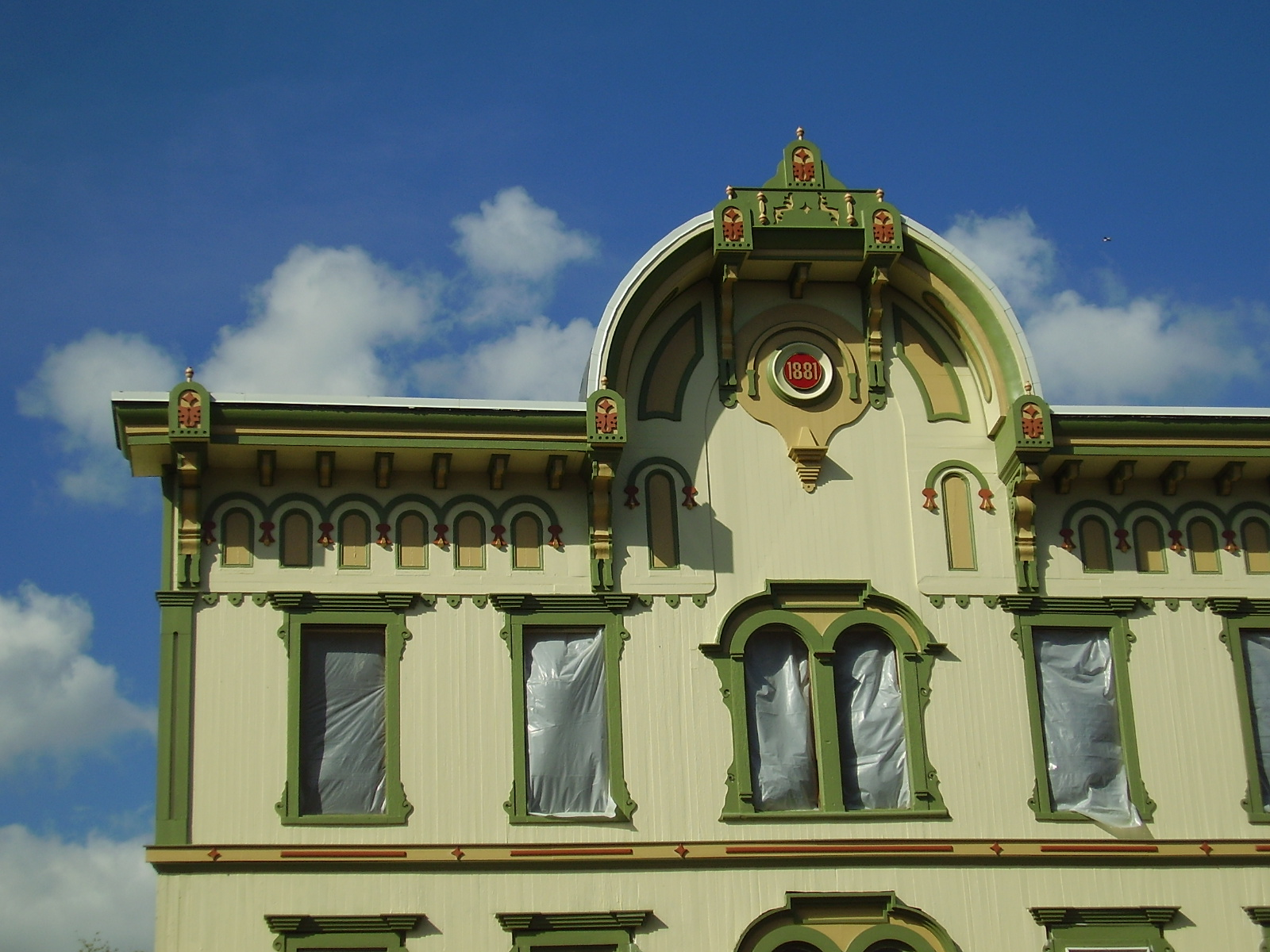
- Nickname: Richfield
- Location within the state of New York
- Coordinates: 42°51′11″N 74°59′15″W
- Country: United States
- State: New York
- Region: Central New York; Leatherstocking Region
- County: Otsego
- Township: Richfield

Area
  - Total: 1.01 sq mi (2.61 km^{2})
  - Land: 1.01 sq mi (2.61 km^{2})
  - Water: 0 sq mi (0.00 km^{2})
- Elevation: 1,300 ft (400 m)

Population (2020)
  - Total: 1,050
  - Density: 1,043.2/sq mi (402.78/km^{2})
- Time zone: UTC-5 (Eastern (EST))
  - Summer (DST): UTC-4 (EDT)
- ZIP code: 13439
- Area code: 315
- FIPS code: 36-61489
- GNIS feature ID: 0962471
- Website: Village of Richfield Springs

Richfield Springs is a village located in the Town of Richfield, on the north-central border of Otsego County, New York, United States. The population was 1,050 at the 2020 census. The name is derived from local sulfur springs.

== Geography ==
The village is at the northern end of Canadarago Lake and is at the border of Herkimer County.

Perspective map of Richfield Springs with list of landmarks from 1885 by L.R. Burleigh

Richfield Springs is located at 42°51′11″N 74°59′15″W (42.853065, -74.987623).

According to the United States Census Bureau, the village has a total area of 1.0 square mile (2.6 km^{2}), all land.

U.S. Highway 20, New York State Route 28, and New York State Route 167 converge in Richfield Springs. US 20 and NY 28 intersect outside the western end of the village limits and overlap for a brief time inside the village, while NY 167 has its southern terminus at US 20 in the center of the village.

== Demographics ==
Historical population
Census	Pop.	Note	%±
1870	696		—
1880	1,307		87.8%
1890	1,623		24.2%
1900	1,537		−5.3%
1910	1,503		−2.2%
1920	1,388		−7.7%
1930	1,333		−4.0%
1940	1,209		−9.3%
1950	1,534		26.9%
1960	1,630		6.3%
1970	1,540		−5.5%
1980	1,561		1.4%
1990	1,565		0.3%
2000	1,255		−19.8%
2010	1,264		0.7%
2020	1,050		−16.9%
U.S. Decennial Census

As of the census of 2000, there were 1,255 people, 536 households, and 324 families residing in the village. The population density was 1,259.2 inhabitants per square mile (486.2/km^{2}). There were 619 housing units at an average density of 621.1 per square mile (239.8/km^{2}). The racial makeup of the village was 96.02% White, 0.56% African American, 0.56% Native American, 0.88% Asian, 0.64% Pacific Islander, and 1.35% from two or more races. Hispanic or Latino of any race were 0.56% of the population.

There were 536 households, out of which 22.8% had children under the age of 18 living with them, 47.0% were married couples living together, 9.7% had a female householder with no husband present, and 39.4% were non-families. 34.0% of all households were made up of individuals, and 19.0% had someone living alone who was 65 years of age or older. The average household size was 2.27 and the average family size was 2.93.

In the village, the population was spread out, with 20.7% under the age of 18, 7.1% from 18 to 24, 22.1% from 25 to 44, 27.1% from 45 to 64, and 23.0% who were 65 years of age or older. The median age was 45 years. For every 100 females, there were 85.9 males. For every 100 females age 18 and over, there were 79.3 males.

The median income for a household in the village was $30,170, and the median income for a family was $40,956. Males had a median income of $29,097 versus $20,455 for females. The per capita income for the village was $16,865. About 7.1% of families and 12.2% of the population were below the poverty line, including 16.1% of those under age 18 and 9.7% of those age 65 or over.

== History ==
The area of Richfield Springs was called Ga-no-wan-ges by the Oneida Indians which translated to "stinking water".

The village was once served by the Southern New York Railroad, an electric trolley line that ran from Oneonta to Mohawk. It began service through Richfield Springs in the summer of 1902.

== Noted architecture ==
The village is home to three national historic districts:

- Church Street Historic District
- East Main Street Historic District
- West Main Street-West James Street Historic District

Individual properties:

- Baker Octagon Barn.
- Richfield Springs Post Office(listed on the National Register of Historic Places in 1989)
- Clayton Lodge - Industrialist Cyrus McCormick from Chicago commissioned the famed New York architectural firm of McKim, Mead, and White to build a shingle-style "cottage" for him and his family on the edge of the village, on Warren Street, the estate would be known as Clayton Lodge. Built in 1882 the sprawling estate with stables and other outbuildings afforded him fresh air living in the summers. The grounds of the estate were landscaped by the foremost designer, Frederick Law Olmsted. The mansion was razed in 1957, but the shingle style stable, albeit altered, is extant today.
- Sunset Hill - Neighboring McCormick's estate, also on Sunset Hill, was the residence of Eugene D. Stocker. His estate, complete with main house, guest house, and stable, was designed by architect Dwight James Baum in 1923. It is extant today and for tax purposes it resides in the Town of Warren, in Herkimer County New York. The Stocker estate, named "Sunset Hill" was listed with the National Register of Historic Places January 4, 2007.

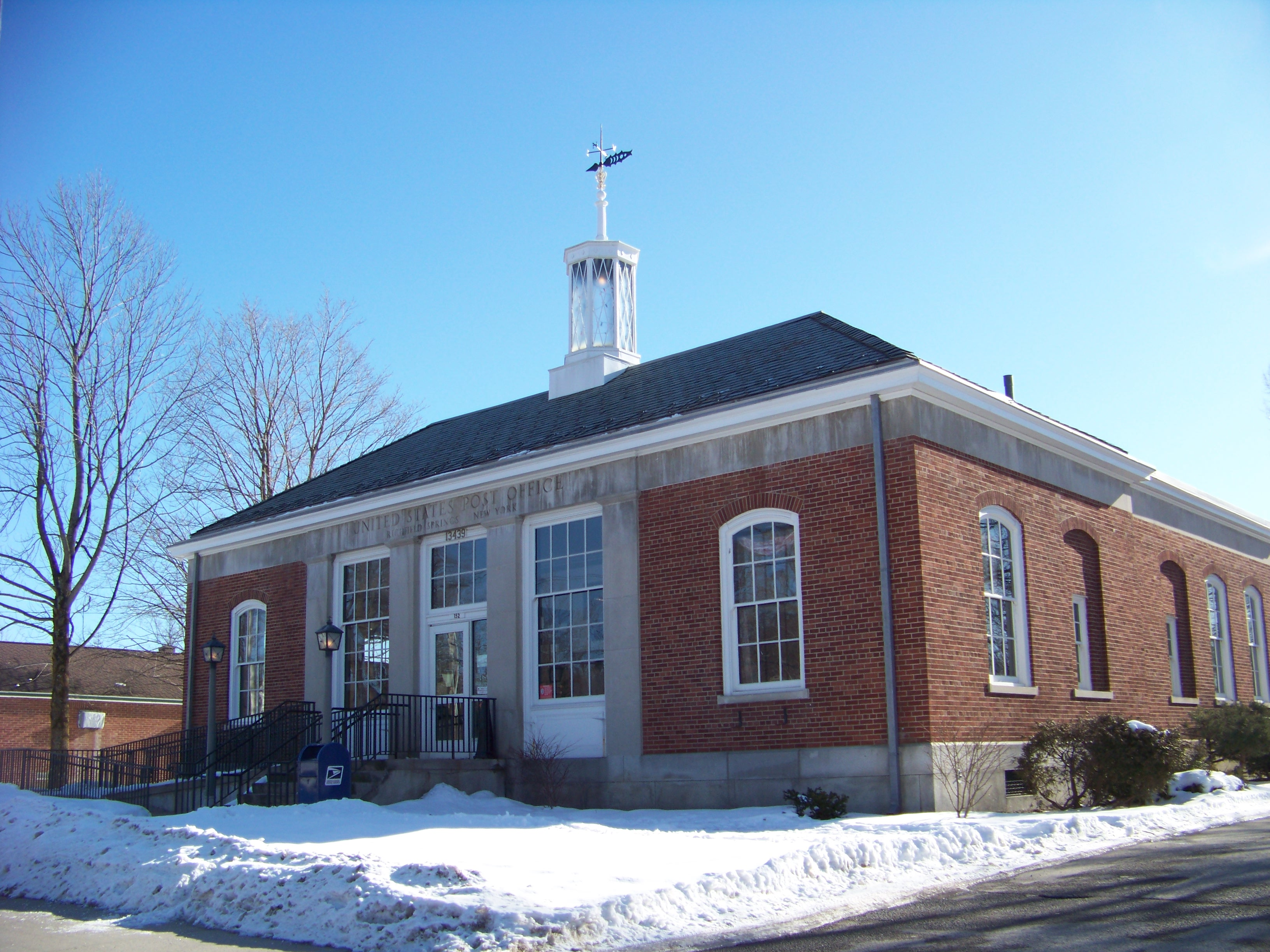
Richfield Springs Post Office

== Notable people ==
- Gaylord Graves, former Wisconsin State Assemblyman
- Martha D. Lincoln, author and journalist
- Benjamin Pringle, former US Congressman
- Jules Feiffer, Pulitzer Prize winning cartoonist
