= List of rivers of the Atacama Region =

The information regarding List of rivers in the Atacama Region on this page has been compiled from the data supplied by GeoNames. It includes all features named "Rio", "Canal", "Arroyo", "Estero" and those Feature Code is associated with a stream of water. (Note: The arbitrarily selected codes are RPDS, CHN, CNLA, CNLB, CNLD, CNLI, CNLN, CNLSB, CRKT, DTCH, DTCHI, DTCHD, ESTY, FORD, SBED, STM, STMA, STMB, STMC, STMD, STMH, STMI, STMIX, STMM, STMQ, STMS, STMSB, STMX, TNLC, WTRC, WTRH) This list contains 61 water streams.

== Content ==
This list contains:

1. Name of the stream, in Spanish Language
2. Coordinates are latitude and longitude of the feature in ± decimal degrees, at the mouth of the stream
3. Link to a map including the Geonameid (a number which uniquely identifies a Geoname feature)
4. Feature Code explained in
5. Other names for the same feature, if any
6. Basin countries additional to Chile, if any

== List ==
Atacama Region

- Quebrada Río Seco • 26.00092°S 70.14365°W • 3873100 • STMI
- Río de la Sal • 26.33333°S 69.75°W • 3872619 • STMI
- Río Salado • 26.36667°S 69.36667°W • 3872599 • STMI
- Río Salado • 26.36667°S 69.38333°W • 3872602 • STM
- Río de La Sal • 26.36667°S 69.63333°W • 3884658 • STM
- Río de la Sal • 26.37908°S 69.64673°W • 3872620 • STM
- Río La Ola • 26.43786°S 69.09383°W • 3885197 • STMI • (Quebrada de La Ola, Quebrada de la Ola, Rio La Ola, Rio Ola, Rio de La Ola, Rio de la Ola, Río La Ola, Río Ola, Río de La Ola, Río de la Ola)
- Río Juncalito • 26.48417°S 69.0593°W • 3886709 • STMI
- Río Salado • 26.51667°S 68.83333°W • 3872598 • STMI
- Río Pastos Largos • 26.71667°S 69.08333°W • 3877043 • STMI • (Rio Pastos Largas, Rio Pastos Largos, Río Pastos Largas, Río Pastos Largos) • (CL)
- Río Dulce • 26.90094°S 68.44385°W • 3892160 • STMI • (Arroyo Dulce, Estero Dulce)
- Río Colorado • 26.93472°S 69.06581°W • 3894022 • STMI
- Río Lamas • 27.06248°S 69.00703°W • 3885376 • STMI • (Rio Lama, Rio Lamas, Río Lama, Río Lamas)
- Río Lajitas • 27.26551°S 69.00444°W • 3885555 • STMI
- Río Copiapó • 27.31397°S 70.931°W • 3893651 • STM • (Rio Copiapo, Río Copiapó)

- Río Manflas • 28.03344°S 69.97952°W • 3880722 • STM • (Rio Manflas, Rio Manflias, Río Manflas)
- Río Jorquera • 28.04543°S 69.96226°W • 3886836 • STM

- Río Figueroa • 27.72215°S 69.56557°W • 3889513 • STM
- Río Turbio (Copiapó) • 27.70833°S 69.55556°W • 3868888 • STM
- Río Turbio • 27.7°S 69.56667°W • 3868889 • STM

- Río Piuquenes • 28.56759°S 69.88748°W • 3875720 • STM • (Quebrada Piuquenes, Quebrada Piuquenes, Rio Piuquenes, Río Piuquenes)

- Río de la Gallina • 27.87467°S 69.27575°W • 3889170 • STM • (Rio La Gallina, Rio de la Gallina, Río La Gallina, Río de la Gallina)

- Río Nevado • 27.93622°S 69.35187°W • 3878711 • STM

- Río Cachitos • 27.88562°S 69.42682°W • 3897498 • STM • (Rio Cachito, Rio Cachitos, Rio Chacrita, Río Cachito, Rïo Cachitos)

- Río Bayo • 27.38333°S 69.03333°W • 3898550 • STMI
- Río Astaburuaga • 27.47385°S 69.19056°W • 3899215 • STM
- Río Paredones • 27.60854°S 69.49676°W • 3877182 • STM • (Quebrada Paredones, Rio Paredones, Río Paredones)
- Río La Laguna • 27.6121°S 69.3548°W • 3885522 • STMI • (Estero La Laguna, Estero de la Laguna)
- Río Aguas Blancas • 27.61308°S 69.51466°W • 3900433 • STM
- Río Plaza • 27.95148°S 69.67617°W • 3875636 • STM
- Río Come Caballos • 27.98333°S 69.35°W • 3893960 • STM • (Arroyo Come Caballos, Estero Come Caballos) • (CL)
- Río Pulido • 28.04551°S 69.963°W • 3874887 • STM

- Río Vizcachas de Pulido • 28.11276°S 69.74979°W • 3868003 • STM

- Río Pircas Coloradas • 27.99143°S 69.69947°W • 3875823 • STM

- Río Montosa • 28.18281°S 69.83485°W • 3879406 • STM Rio Montoso

- Río Ramadillas • 28.11303°S 69.74944°W • 3873803 • STM
- Río Ramadas • 28.15897°S 70.02724°W • 3873818 • STM
- Río Potro • 28.21345°S 69.7671°W • 3875254 • STM
- Río de Las Pircas de Mondaca • 28.21386°S 69.71724°W • 3884005 • STM
- Río del Medio • 28.2581°S 69.73606°W • 3880160 • STM
- Quebrada del Medio • 28.27653°S 69.97987°W • 3880163 • STM • (Quebrada del Medio, Rio del Medio, Río del Medio)
- Río Tolar • 28.40241°S 69.96203°W • 3869696 • STM
- Río del Toro • 28.41752°S 69.96188°W • 3869541 • STM
- Río Huasco • 28.44751°S 71.20603°W • 3887753 • STM • (Rio Guasco, Rio Huasco, Río Huasco)

- Río del Tránsito • 28.75259°S 70.48346°W • 3869299 • STM • (Rio El Transito, Rio del Transito, Río El Tránsito, Río del Tránsito)

- Río Conay • 28.94796°S 70.11023°W • 3893900 • STM • (Rio Conai, Rio Conay, Río Conai, Río Conay)

- Río Chollay • 28.973°S 70.16372°W • 3894880 • STM • (Rio Cholay, Rio Chollai, Rio Chollay, Río Cholay, Río Chollai, Río Chollay)

- Río Blanco • 29.13692°S 70.13729°W • 3898238 • STMI • (Arroyo Blanco, Estero Blanco)

- Río del Carmen • 28.75282°S 70.48399°W • 3896600 • STM

- Río del Medio • 29.55564°S 70.22678°W • 3880159 • STM
- Río Sancarrón • 29.56267°S 70.07121°W • 3872312 • STM
- Rio del Toro • 29.3337°S 70.06256°W • 6324661 • STM
- Río Primero • 29.5562°S 70.22728°W • 3875170 • STM
- Río Laguna Grande • 28.88506°S 70.04418°W • 3885766 • STM

- Quebrada Río de Collo • 28.76667°S 70.5°W • 3873135 • STMI
- Río del Cazadero • 28.76946°S 69.9935°W • 3896053 • STM • (Rio Cazadero, Rio del Cazadero, Río Cazadero, Río del Cazadero)
- Río Laguna Chica • 28.86969°S 69.94938°W • 3885772 • STM
- Río de Valeriano • 28.88586°S 70.04452°W • 3868671 • STM • (Arroyo Valeriana, Rio Valeriano, Rio de Valeriano, Río Valeriano, Río de Valeriano)
- Río Plata • 28.98068°S 70.19549°W • 3875662 • STM
- Arroyo Valeriana • 29.05°S 69.86667°W • 3868673 • STM
- Río Potrerillo • 29.33318°S 70.34216°W • 3875324 • STM
- Río Tres Quebradas • 29.41963°S 70.21356°W • 3869139 • STM
- Río Elqui • 29.89311°S 71.26966°W • 3890618 • STM • (Rio Elaui, Rio Elqui, Río Elaui, Río Elqui)

== See also ==
- List of lakes in Chile
- List of volcanoes in Chile
- List of islands of Chile
- List of fjords, channels, sounds and straits of Chile
- List of lighthouses in Chile
