= Channeled Scablands =

Landscape in Washington state, US

Coordinates: 47°00′00″N 118°30′00″W

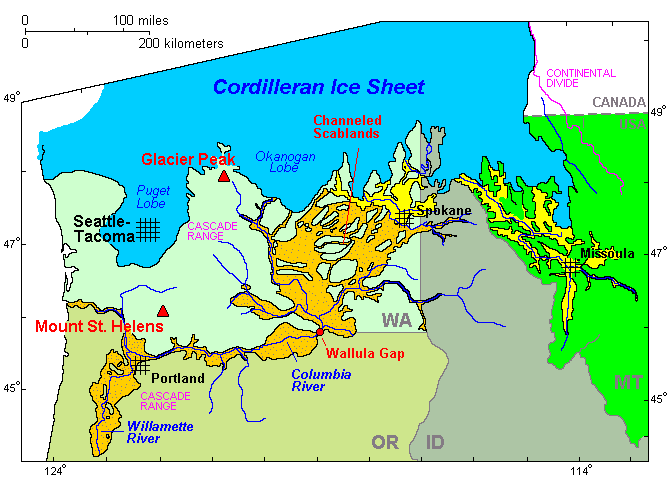
Cordilleran Ice Sheet maximum extent of Glacial Lake Missoula (eastern) and Glacial Lake Columbia (western) areas swept by Missoula and Columbia floods

The Channeled Scablands are a relatively barren and soil-free region of interconnected relict and dry flood channels, coulees and cataracts and the typically flat-lying basalt flows that remain after cataclysmic floods. They are located in the southeastern part of Washington state. The Channeled Scablands were scoured by more than 40 cataclysmic floods during the Last Glacial Maximum and innumerable older cataclysmic floods over the last two million years. These floods were periodically unleashed whenever a large glacial lake broke through its ice dam and swept across eastern Washington and down the Columbia River Plateau during the Pleistocene epoch. The last of the cataclysmic floods occurred between 18,200 and 14,000 years ago. The floods eroded the area into the Palouse loess.

Geologist J Harlen Bretz defined "scablands" in a series of papers written in the 1920s as lowlands diversified by a multiplicity of irregular channels and rock basins eroded into basalt. Flood waters eroded the loess cover, creating large anastomizing channels that exposed bare basalt and creating butte-and-basin topography. The buttes range in height from 30 to 230 m (98 to 755 ft), while the rock basins range from 10 m (33 ft) in width up to the 11 km (7 mi) long and 30 m deep Rock Lake. Bretz further stated, "The channels run uphill and downhill, they unite and they divide, they head on the back-slopes and cut through the summit; they could not be more erratically and impossibly designed."

The debate on the origin of the Scablands that ensued for four decades became one of the great controversies in the history of earth science. The Scablands are also important to planetary scientists as perhaps the best terrestrial analog of the Martian outflow channels.

== History ==
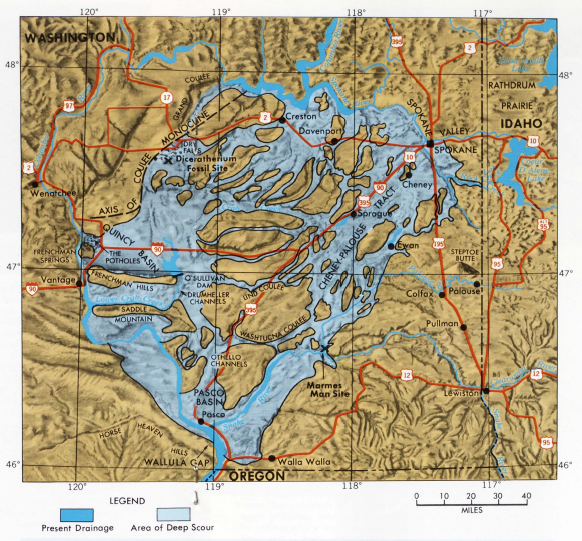
Map of the Channeled Scablands

Bretz conducted research and published many papers during the 1920s describing the Channeled Scablands. His theories of how they were formed required short but immense floods – 500 cubic miles (2,100 km^{3}) – for which Bretz had no explanation. His theories of apparent catastrophism met with vehement opposition from geologists of the day, who tried to explain the features with uniformitarian theories – that they were shaped by processes still acting today.

J. T. Pardee first suggested in 1925 to Bretz that the draining of a glacial lake could account for flows of the magnitude needed. Pardee continued his research over the next 30 years, collecting and analyzing evidence that eventually identified Lake Missoula as the source of the floods (now the Missoula floods) and creator of the Channeled Scablands.

Pardee's and Bretz's theories were accepted only after decades of painstaking work and fierce scientific debate. Research on open-channel hydraulics in the 1970s put Bretz's theories on solid scientific ground. In 1979 Bretz received the highest medal of the Geological Society of America, the Penrose Medal, to recognize that he had developed one of the great ideas in the earth sciences.

== Geology ==
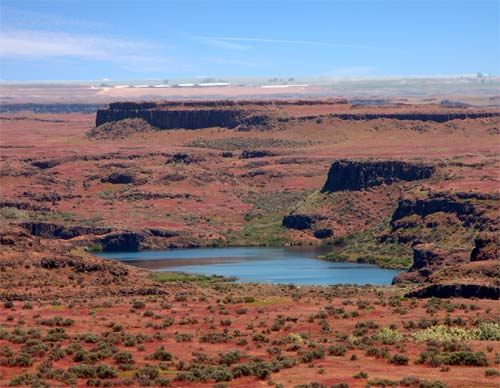
Drumheller Channels

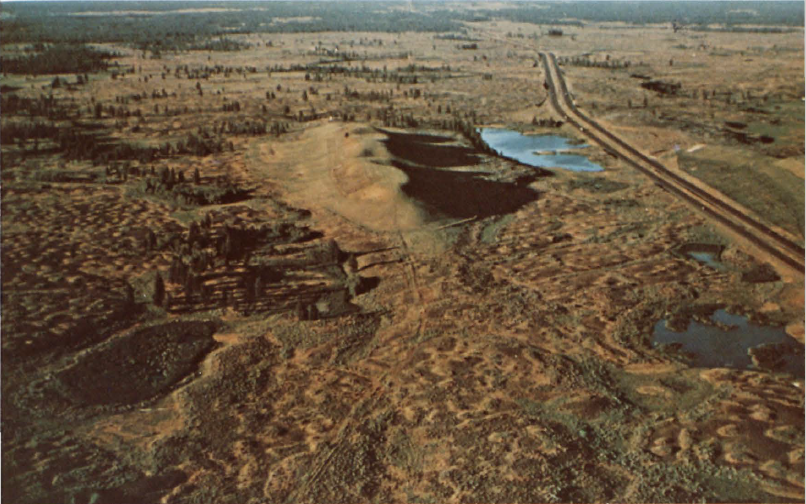
Loess island remnant in the Scablands

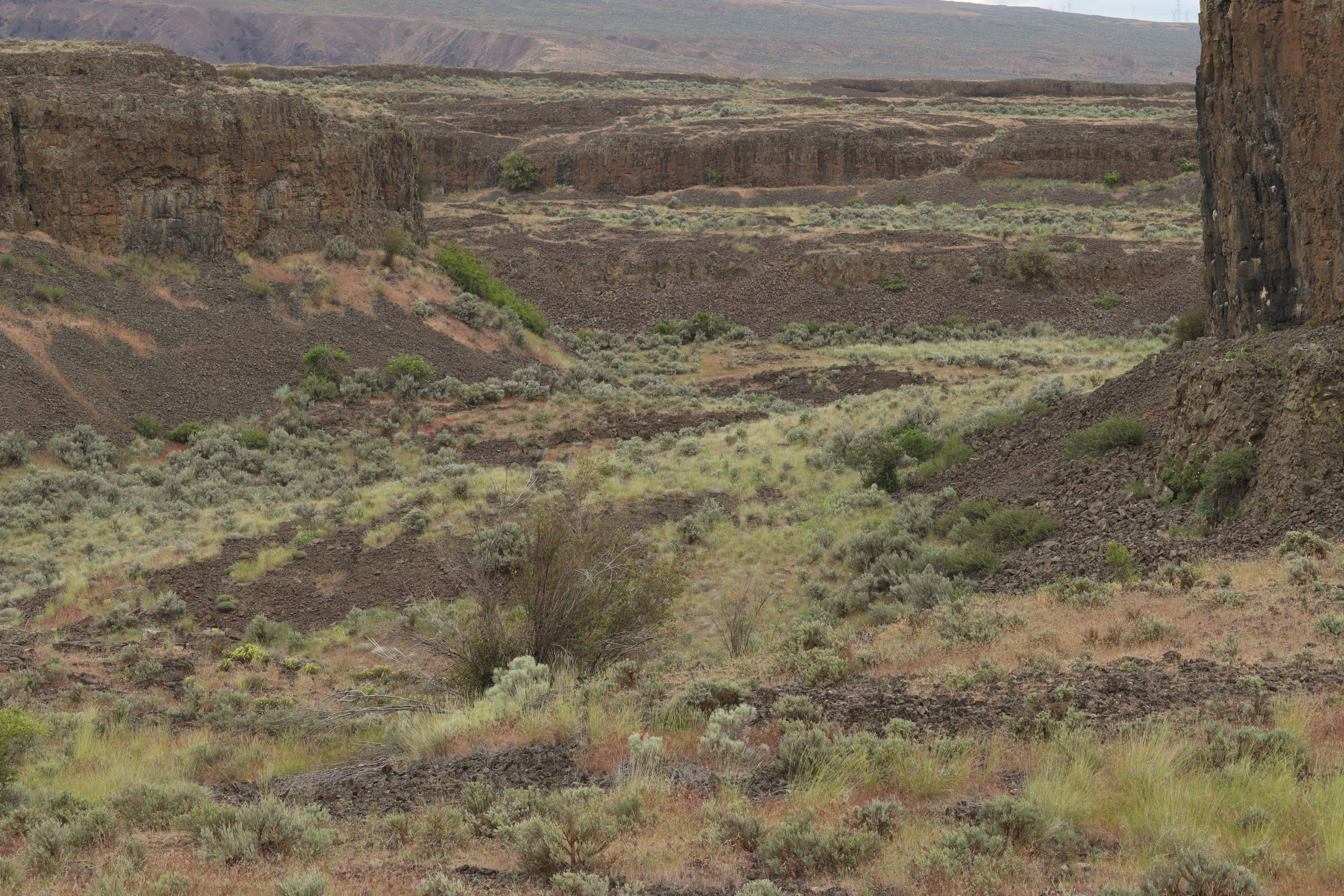
View downstream of Park Lake Side Canyon, one of the channels which fed floodwaters to Grand Coulee

Distinct geomorphological features include coulees, dry falls, streamlined hills and islands of remnant loess, gravel fans and bars, and giant current ripples.

The term scabland refers to an area that has experienced fluvial erosion resulting in the loss of loess and other soils, leaving the land barren. River valleys formed by erosional downcutting of rivers create V-shaped valleys, while glaciers carve out U-shaped valleys. The Channeled Scablands have a rectangular cross section, with flat plateaus and steep canyon sides, and are spread over immense areas of eastern Washington. The morphology of the scablands is butte-and-basin. The area that encompasses the Scablands has been estimated between 1,500 and 2,000 square miles (3,900 and 5,200 km^{2}), though those estimates still may be too conservative.

They exhibit a unique drainage pattern that appears to have an entrance in the northeast and an exit in the southwest. The Cordilleran ice sheet dammed up Glacial Lake Missoula at the Purcell Trench Lobe. A series of floods occurring over the period of 18,000 to 13,000 years ago swept over the landscape when the ice dam broke. The eroded channels also show an anastomosing, or braided, appearance.

The presence of Middle and Early Pleistocene Missoula flood deposits have been documented within the Channeled Scabland as other parts of the Columbia Basin, e.g. the Othello Channels, Columbia River Gorge, Quincy Basin, Pasco Basin, and the Walla Walla Valley. Based on the presence of multiple interglacial calcretes interbedded with glaciofluvial flood deposits, magnetostratigraphy, optically stimulated luminescence dating, and unconformity truncated clastic dikes, it has been estimated that the oldest of these megafloods flowed through the Channel Scablands sometime before 1.5 million years ago. Because of the fragmentary nature of older glaciofluvial deposits, which have been largely removed by subsequent Missoula floods, the exact number of older Missoula floods, which are known as Ancient Cataclysmic Floods, that occurred during the Pleistocene cannot be estimated with any confidence. As many as 100 separate, cataclysmic Ice Age floods may have occurred during the last glaciation. There have been at least 17 complete interglacial-glacial cycles since about 1.77 million years ago, and perhaps as many as 44 interglacial-glacial cycles since the beginning of the Pleistocene about 2.58 million years ago. Presuming a dozen (or more) floods were associated with each glaciation, the total number of cataclysmic Ice Age Missoula floods that flowed through the Channeled Scablands for the entire Pleistocene Epoch could possibly number in the hundreds, perhaps exceeding a thousand Ancient Cataclysmic Floods.

There are also immense potholes and ripple marks, much larger than those found on ordinary rivers. When these features were first studied, no known theories could explain their origin. The giant current ripples are between 3 and 49 feet (1 and 15 m) high and are regularly spaced, relatively uniform hills. Vast volumes of flowing water would be required to produce ripple marks of this magnitude, as they are larger-scale versions of the ripple marks found on streambeds that are typically only centimeters high. Large potholes were formed by swirling vortexes of water called kolks scouring and plucking out the bedrock.

The Scablands are littered with large boulders called glacial erratics that rafted on glaciers and were deposited by the glacial outburst flooding. The lithology of erratics usually does not match the rock type that surrounds it, as they are often carried very far from their origin.

== See also ==
- Wallula Gap – Water gap in Washington, U.S.
- Grand Coulee – Ancient river bed in the U.S. state of Washington
- Moses Coulee – Canyon in the Waterville plateau region of Douglas County, Washington
- Lake Lenore (Washington) – Lake in Grant County, Washington, U.S.
- Glacial lake outburst flood – Type of outburst flood that occurs when the dam containing a glacial lake fails
- Drumheller Channels National Natural Landmark – U.S. natural landmark in Washington state
- Dry Falls – Scalloped precipice with four major alcoves, in central Washington scablands
- Giant current ripples – Depositional forms in channeled scablands
- Diluvium – Deposits created by outbursts of Pleistocene glacier-dammed lakes
- Outflow channels – Long, wide swathes of scoured ground on Mars
- Altai flood – Prehistoric event in Central Asia
- Turnbull National Wildlife Refuge – Protected area in Washington state, US
- Touchet Formation – Geological formation in Washington, US
- Lake Lewis

== Additional references ==
- Allen, John Eliot; Burns, Marjorie; Sargent, Sam C. (1986). Cataclysms on the Columbia. Portland, Oregon: Timber Press. ISBN 0-88192-215-3.
- Bretz, J Harlen (1923). "The Channeled Scabland of the Columbia Plateau". Journal of Geology. 31 (8): 617–649. Bibcode:1923JG.....31..617B. doi:10.1086/623053.
- Bretz, J Harlen (1925). "The Spokane flood beyond the Channeled Scablands". Journal of Geology. 33 (2): 97–115, 236–259. Bibcode:1925JG.....33...97B. doi:10.1086/623179.
- Bretz, J.; Smith, H. T.; Neff, G. E. (1956). "Channeled Scabland of Washington: New Data and Interpretations". Geological Society of America Bulletin. 67 (8): 957–1049. doi:10.1130/0016-7606(1956)67[957:CSOWND]2.0.CO;2.
- Soennichsen, John (2008). Bretz's Flood: The Remarkable Story of a Rebel Geologist and the World's Greatest Flood. Seattle, Washington: Sasquatch Books. ISBN 978-1-57061-505-4.
