= Buffalo Knoll =

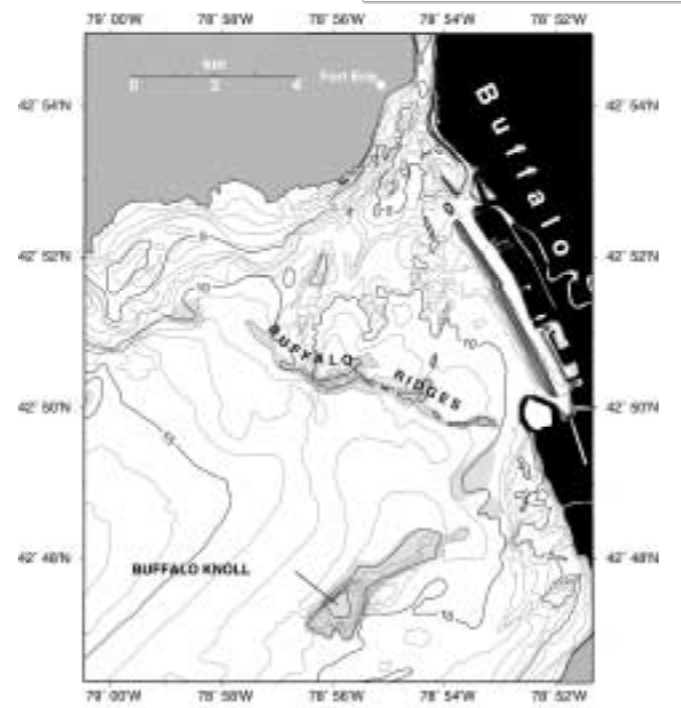
Buffalo Knoll is a shallow shoal off the shore of Buffalo NY that may be a sign of an earlier shoreline.

Buffalo Knoll is a shallow outcropping off the shore of Buffalo, New York.

The knoll is southwest of downtown Buffalo, approximately 2 kilometers offshore. It lies at a depth of about four metres, and rapidly drops off to about nine metres.

== Explanations ==
Several explanations of how Buffalo Knoll, and the nearby Buffalo Ridges formed. Lake Erie, and the other North American Great Lakes, are products of the geologically recent Laurentian glaciation. The shorelines of the lakes, and the proglacial lakes that preceded them, have fluctuated wildly. The Earth's crust is still slowly rebounding from the extra weight of being covered by kilometers of ice, and this has altered the locations of shorelines. As lobes of the glacier retreated it dammed river valleys that now drain the lakes, which also altered the locations of their shorelines.

One explanation is that the knoll is a remainder of a moraine, ploughed up by a temporary glaciation advance that interrupted its retreat.

Another explanation is that the lower lying regions, surrounding the knoll, and the Buffalo Ridges were caused by glacial kettles. As glaciers retreat, they sometimes leave behind large chunks of ice. The surface level of the ground around the fossil ice forms around the large fragments of fossil ice. When the ice finally melts, it can leave an otherwise mysterious depression.
