= Glacial lake outburst flood =

Type of outburst flood that occurs when the dam containing a glacial lake fails

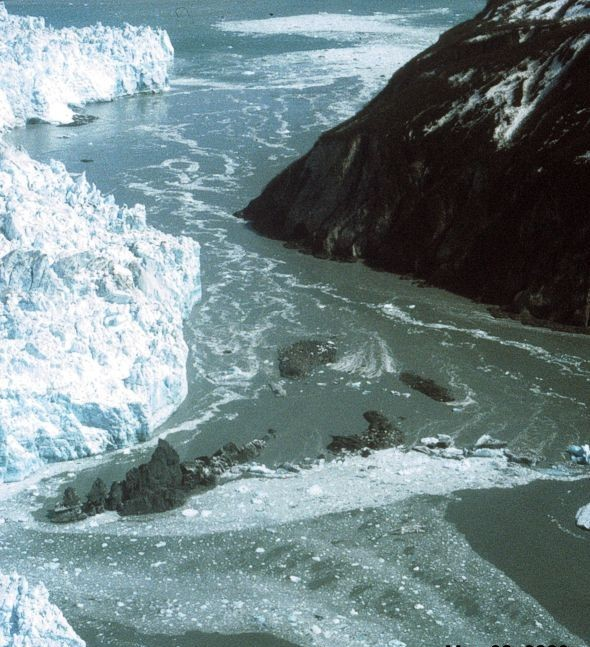
Hubbard Glacier, Alaska, squeezes towards Gibert Point on 20 May 2002. The glacier is close to sealing off Russell Fjord (top) from Disenchantment Bay (below).

A glacial lake outburst flood (GLOF) is a type of outburst flood caused by the failure of a dam containing a glacial lake. An event similar to a GLOF, where a body of water contained by a glacier melts or overflows the glacier, is called a jökulhlaup. The dam can consist of glacier ice or a terminal moraine. Failure can happen due to erosion, a buildup of water pressure, an avalanche of rock or heavy snow, an earthquake or cryoseism, volcanic eruptions under the ice, or massive displacement of water in a glacial lake when a large portion of an adjacent glacier collapses into it.

Increasing glacial melting because of climate change, alongside other environmental effects of climate change (i.e. permafrost melting) mean that regions with glaciers are likely to see increased flooding risks from GLOFs. This is especially true in the Himalayas where geologies are more active.

A 2023 study found 15 million people at risk from this hazard, mostly in China, India, Nepal, Pakistan, and Peru.

== Definition ==
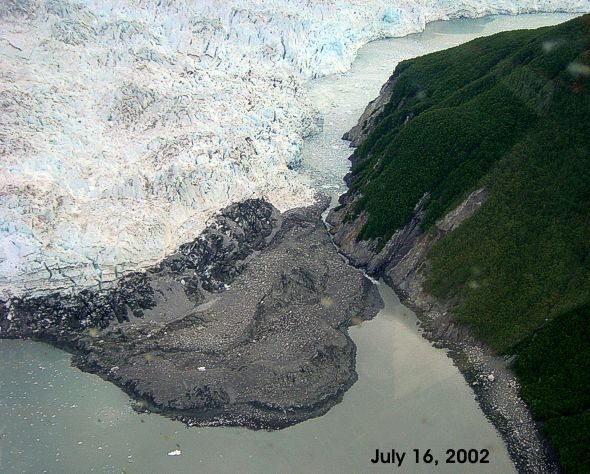
In this Hubbard Glacier image from 16 July 2002, the glacier has closed off Russell Fjord from Disenchantment Bay. The waters behind the glacier rose 61 feet (19 m) in 10 weeks, creating a short lived Russell Lake.

A glacial lake outburst flood is a type of outburst flood occurring when water dammed by a glacier or a moraine is released. A water body that is dammed by the front of a glacier is called a ice-marginal lake, and a water body that is capped by the glacier is called a sub-glacial lake. When a marginal lake bursts, it may also be called a marginal lake drainage. When a sub-glacial lake bursts, it may be called a jökulhlaup.

A jökulhlaup is thus a sub-glacial outburst flood. Jökulhlaup is an Icelandic term that has been adopted into the English language, originally referring only to glacial outburst floods from Vatnajökull, which are triggered by volcanic eruptions, but now is accepted to describe any abrupt and large release of sub-glacial water.

Glacial lake volumes vary, but may hold millions to hundreds of millions of cubic metres of water. Catastrophic failure of the containing ice or glacial sediment can release this water over periods of minutes to days. Peak flows as high as 15,000 cubic metres per second have been recorded in such events, suggesting that the v-shaped canyon of a normally small mountain stream could suddenly develop an extremely turbulent and fast-moving torrent some 50 metres (160 ft) deep. Glacial Lake Outburst Floods are often compounded by a massive river bed erosion in the steep moraine valleys, as a result, the flood peaks increase as they flow downstream until the river reaches, where the sediment deposits. On a downstream floodplain, it suggests a somewhat slower inundation spreading as much as 10 kilometres (6.2 mi) wide. Both scenarios are significant threats to life, property and infrastructure.

== Monitoring ==
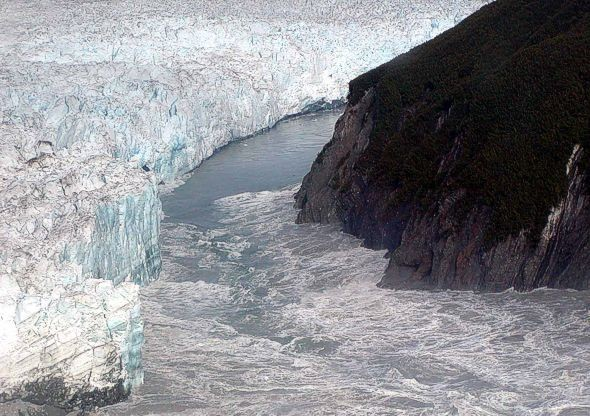
The Hubbard Glacier is overwhelmed on 14 August 2002 in the second largest GLOF in historical times.

The United Nations has a series of monitoring efforts to help prevent death and destruction in regions that are likely to experience these events. The importance of this situation has magnified over the past century due to increased populations, and the increasing number of glacial lakes that have developed due to glacier retreat. While all countries with glaciers are susceptible to this problem, central Asia, the Andes regions of South America and those countries in Europe that have glaciers in the Alps, have been identified as the regions at greatest risk.

There are a number of imminent deadly GLOF situations that have been identified worldwide. The Tsho Rolpa glacier lake is located in the Rolwaling Valley, about 110 kilometres (68 mi) northeast of Kathmandu, Nepal, at an altitude of 4,580 metres (15,030 ft). The lake is dammed by a 150 metres (490 ft) high unconsolidated terminal moraine dam. The lake is growing larger every year due to the melting and retreat of the Trakarding Glacier, and has become the largest and most dangerous glacier lake in Nepal, with approximately 90–100 million m^{3} (120–130 million yd^{3}) of water stored.

== Examples ==
=== Asia ===
==== India ====
In June 2013, Kedarnath in Uttarakhand witnessed flash floods along with a GLOF caused by Chorabari Tal, killing thousands of pilgrims, tourists and residents who came to visit the place.

==== Pakistan ====
Pakistan has more than 7000 glaciers, which is more than anywhere else in the world, except for the polar regions. As of 2018, more than 3,000 glacial lakes had formed in Gilgit-Baltistan, with 30 identified by the UNDP as posing an imminent threat of glacial lake outburst flooding. In 2017, a "Scaling up of Glacial Lake Outburst Flood Risk Reduction in Northern Pakistan Project" was continued. In 1929, a GLOF from the Chong Khumdan Glacier in the Karakoram caused flooding on the Indus River 1,200 km downstream (a maximum flood rise of 8.1 m at Attock).

==== Bhutan ====
GLOFs occur with regularity in the valleys and low lying river plains of Bhutan. In the recent past, flash floods have occurred in the Thimphu, Paro and Punankha-Wangdue valleys. Of the 2674 glacial lakes in Bhutan, 24 have been identified by a recent study as candidates for GLOFs in the near future. In October 1994, a GLOF 90 kilometres (56 mi) upstream from Punakha Dzong caused massive flooding on the Pho Chhu River, damaging the dzong and causing casualties.

In 2001, scientists identified Lake Thorthormi as one that threatened imminent and catastrophic collapse. The situation was eventually relieved by carving a water channel from the lip of the lake to relieve water pressure.

==== Nepal ====
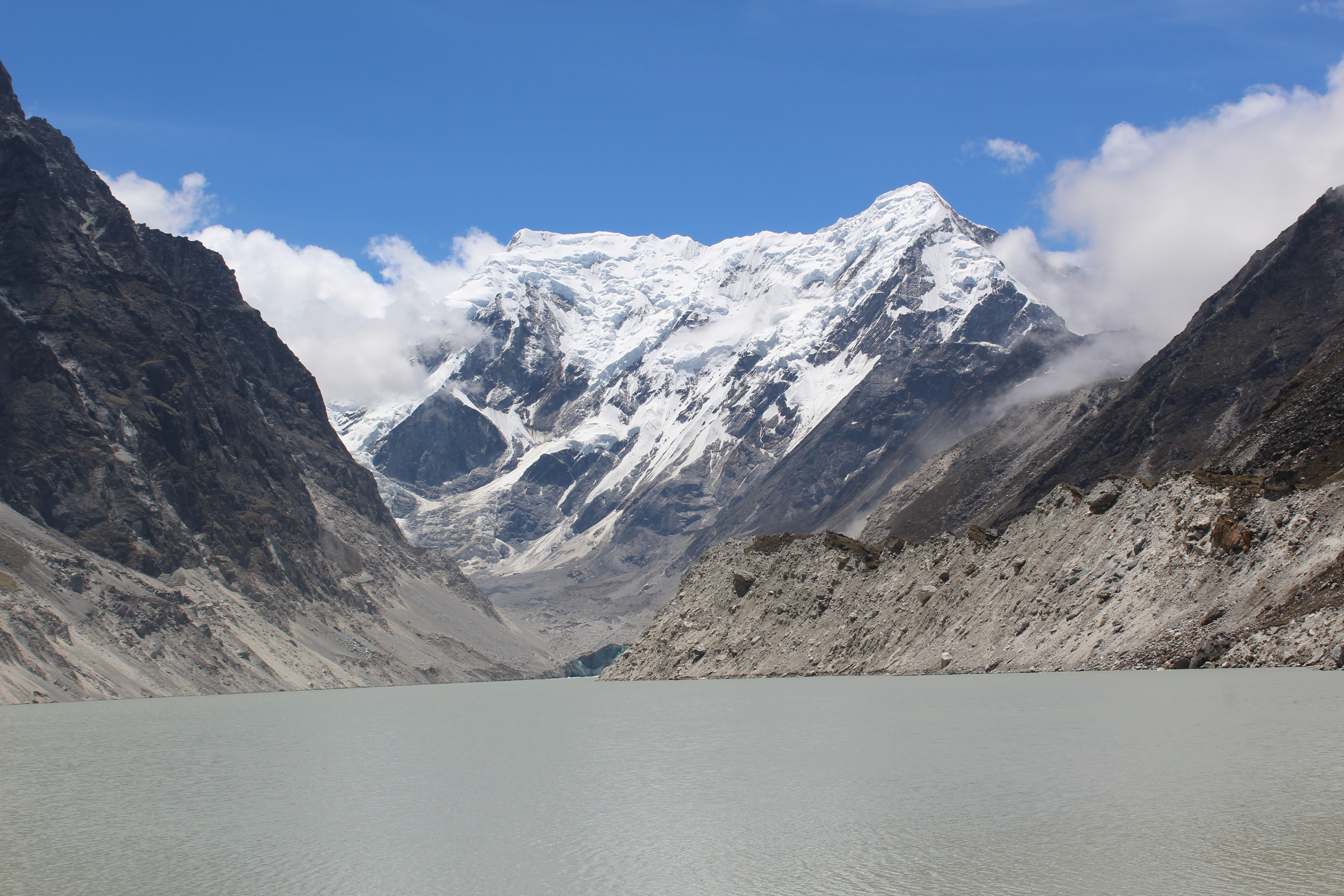
Tsho Rolpa Glacier Lake is one of the biggest glacial lakes in Nepal. The lake, which is located at an altitude of 4,580 metres (15,030 ft) in the Rolwaling Valley, Dolakha District, has grown considerably over the last 50 years due to glacial melting in the Himalayas.

Even though GLOF events have been occurring in Nepal for many decades, the 1985 Dig Cho glacial lake outburst has triggered detailed study of this phenomenon. In 1996, the Water and Energy Commission Secretariat (WECS) of Nepal reported that five lakes were potentially dangerous, namely, Dig Tsho, Imja, Lower Barun, Tsho Rolpa, and Thulagi, all lying above 4100 m. A 2001 study done by ICIMOD and UNEP reported 20 potentially dangerous lakes in Nepal. In ten of them GLOF events have occurred in the past few years and some have been regenerating after the event. Additional dangerous glacial lakes may exist in parts of Tibet that are drained by streams crossing into Nepal, raising the possibility of outburst incidents in Tibet causing downstream damage in Nepal. The Gandaki River basin is reported to contain 1025 glaciers and 338 lakes.

The Thulagi glacier located in the Upper Marsyangdi River basin, is one out of the two moraine-dammed lakes (supra-glacial lakes), identified as a potentially dangerous lake. The Kreditanstalt für Wiederaufbau, Frankfurt am Main, the BGR (Federal Institute for Geosciences and Natural Resources, Germany), in cooperation with the Department of Hydrology and Meteorology in Kathmandu, have carried out studies on the Thulagi Glacier and have concluded in 2011 that even assuming the worst case, a disastrous outburst of the lake can be excluded in the near future.

Recent destructive glacial lake outburst floods in Nepal include the 2024 Thame flood, and two of the 2025 Nepal floods.

==== China ====
Longbasaba and Pida lakes are two moraine-dammed lakes at an altitude of about 5,700 m (18,700 ft) in the Eastern Himalayas. Due to the rise of temperature, the areas of the Longbasaba and Kaer glaciers decreased by 8.7% and 16.6% from 1978 to 2005. Water from glaciers directly flowed into Longbasaba and Pida lakes, and the area of the two lakes increased by 140% and 194%. According to the report of the Hydrological Department of Tibet in 2006, if a GLOF had occurred at the two lakes, 23 towns and villages, where more than 12,500 people live, would have been endangered.

In Tibet, one of the major barley producing areas of the Tibetan Plateau was destroyed by GLOFs in August 2000. More than 10,000 homes, 98 bridges and dykes were destroyed and its estimated cost was about $75 million. The farming communities faced food shortages that year by losing their grain and livestock.

A major GLOF was reported in 1978 in the valley of the Shaksgam River in the Karakoram, a part of historic Kashmir, ceded by Pakistan to China.

=== Europe ===
==== Iceland ====
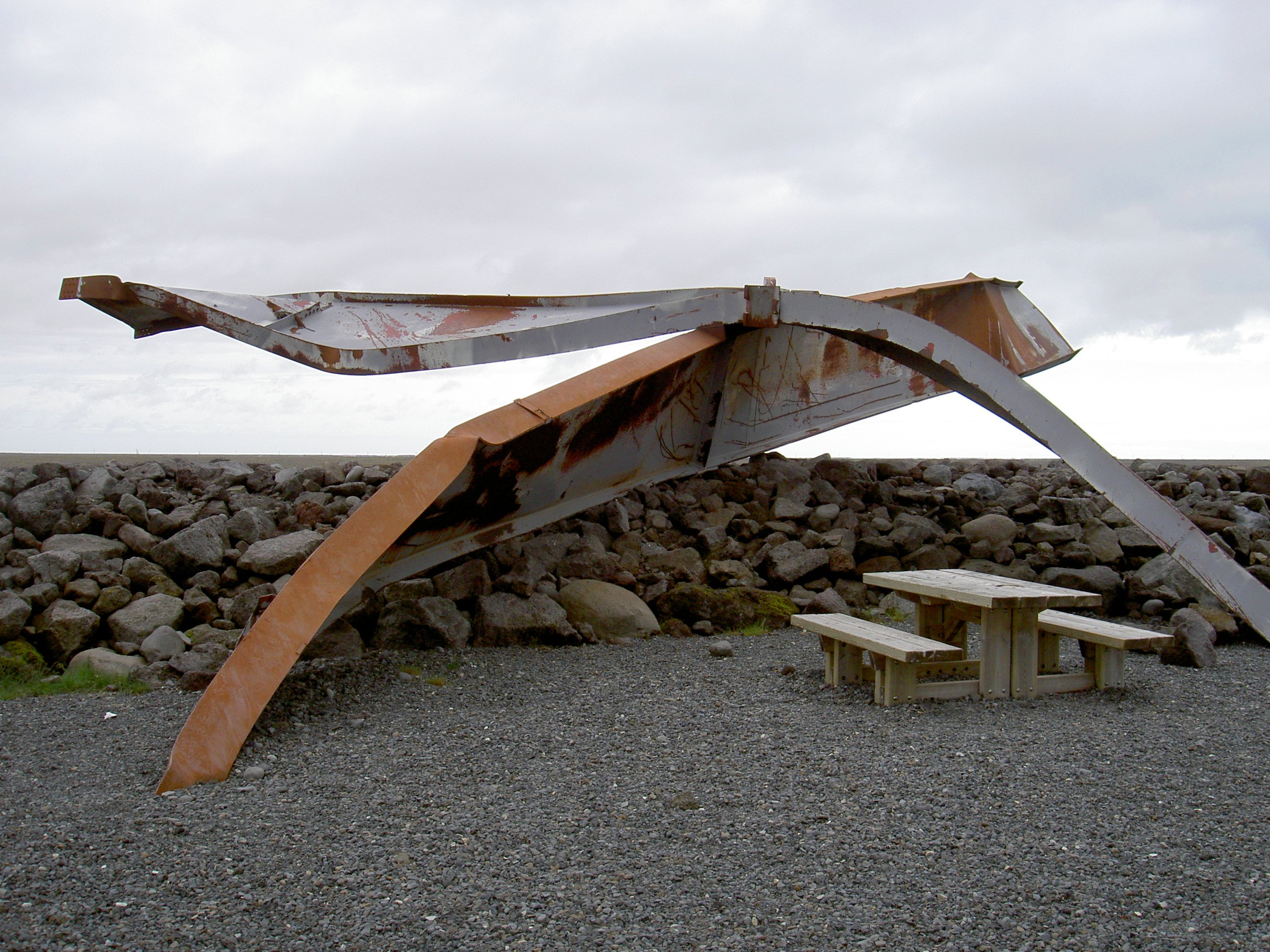
Remains of a steel bridge, close to Skaftafell, after a glacial outburst

The most famous are the immense jökulhlaup released from the Vatnajökull Ice Cap in Iceland. It is not by chance that the term jökulhlaup (jökull = glacier, hlaup = run (n.)/running) comes from Icelandic, as the south of Iceland has frequently been the victim of such catastrophes. This was the case in 1996, when a volcano north of the Grímsvötn lake belonging to the Vatnajökull glacier erupted, filling Grímsvötn, and then the river Skeiðará flooded the land in front of Skaftafell, now part of Vatnajökull National Park. The jökulhlaup reached a flow rate of 50,000 cubic metres per second, and destroyed parts of the Hringvegur (Ring Road or Iceland Road #1). The flood carried ice floes that weighed up to 5000 tons with icebergs between 100 and 200 tons striking the Gigjukvisl Bridge of the Ring Road (the ruins are well marked with explanatory signs today as a popular tourist stop). The tsunami released was up to 4 metres (13 ft) high and 600 metres (660 yd) wide. The flood carried with it 185 million tons of silt.

The jökulhlaup flow made it for several days the second largest river (in terms of water flow) after the Amazon.

After the flooding, some icebergs 10 metres (33 ft) high could be seen on the banks of the river where the glacier run had left them behind (see also Mýrdalsjökull). The peak water release from a lake that develops around the Grímsvötn Volcanic Crater in the center of the Vatnajökull ice cap generates flows that exceed the volume of the Mississippi River. The outbursts have occurred in 1954, 1960, 1965, 1972, 1976, 1982, 1983, 1986, 1991 and 1996. In 1996, the eruption melted 3 cubic kilometres (0.72 cu mi) of ice and yielded an outburst of 6,000 cubic metres (7,800 cu yd) per second at peak flow.

==== Strait of Dover ====
The Strait of Dover is thought to have been created around 200,000 years ago by a catastrophic GLOF caused by the breaching of the Weald-Artois Anticline, which acted as a natural dam that held back a large lake in the Doggerland region, now submerged under the North Sea. The flood would have lasted several months, releasing as much as one million cubic metres of water per second. The cause of the breach is not known but may have been caused by an earthquake or simply the build-up of water pressure in the lake. As well as destroying the isthmus that connected Britain to continental Europe, the flood carved a large bedrock-floored valley down the length of the English Channel, leaving behind streamlined islands and longitudinal erosional grooves characteristic of catastrophic megaflood events.

==== Swiss Alps ====
The 1818 Giétro Glacier catastrophe, killing 44 people, originated in a 4-km long valley located in south-western Switzerland. Fatal flooding was known during historical times with 140 deaths first recorded in 1595. After an increase of the glacier during the "Year Without a Summer", an ice cone started to form from the accumulation of falling seracs. During 1816, the valley filled into a lake which emptied during the spring of 1817. In spring of 1818, the lake measured about 2 km in length. To stop the rapid rise of waters, the canton engineer Ignaz Venetz decided to drill a sluice hole through the ice, tunneling from both upstream and downstream sides of the ice dam at an elevation of about 20 metres above the lake surface. An avalanche interrupted work, so a secondary tunnel was then drilled for safety reasons as the waters rose to 10 metres below. Dangerous sloughing of ice delayed the work until finally a 198-metre-long hole was completed on 4 June, days before the lake began to escape via the manmade waterfall on 13 June. Venetz warned the inhabitants of the valley of the danger as water was also escaping from the base of the cone. However, the cone began to crack on the morning of 16 June and at 16:30 the ice dam broke sending 18 million m^{3} of flood waters into the valley below.

=== Americas ===
==== Alaska ====
During the late Quaternary, ancient Lake Atna in the Copper River Basin may have generated a number of glacial outburst floods.

Some jökulhlaups release annually. Lake George near the Knik River had large annual outbreaks from 1918 to 1966. Since 1966 the Knik Glacier has retreated and an ice-dam is no longer created. Lake George might resume annual floods if the glacier thickens again and blocks the valley (Post and Mayo, 1971). Hidden Lake on the Kennicott Glacier and Kennicott River in the Wrangell-St. Elias National Park near McCarthy regularly experiences destructive floods.

Almost every year, GLOFs occur in three locations in southeastern Alaska, one of which is Abyss Lake. The releases associated with the Tulsequah Glacier northeast of Juneau often inundate a nearby airstrip. About 40 cabins could potentially be affected and a few have been damaged by the larger floods. Events from Salmon Glacier near Hyder have damaged roads near the Salmon River.. Annual events in the Suicide Basin/Kʼóox Ḵaadí Basin above the Mendenhall Glacier in Juneau have led to local disaster declarations and damage to homes along the Mendenhall River. The 2024 event caused damages estimated between $2.8 and $5.6 million. Prior to the 2025 event, the City and Borough of Juneau in partnership with the United States Army Corps of Engineers and informed by research, models and forecasting from the Alaska Climate Adaptation Science Center, the University of Alaska Southeast and the United States Geological Survey, installed a temporary levee system along the Mendenhall River utilizing HESCO barriers to minimize the impact of future flood events.

==== Contiguous United States ====
Immense prehistoric GLOFs, known as the Missoula Floods or Spokane Floods, occurred in North America's Columbia River watershed toward the end of the last ice age. They were the result of periodic breaches of ice dams in present-day Montana, resulting in the draining of a body of water now known as Glacial Lake Missoula. The immense floods scoured the Columbia Plateau as the water raced toward the ocean, resulting in the Channeled Scablands topography that exists today across Central and Eastern Washington.

Glacial River Warren drained Glacial Lake Agassiz during the Wisconsinian glaciation; the now mild Minnesota River flows through its bed. This river seasonally drained glacial meltwater into what is now the Upper Mississippi River. The region now termed the Driftless Area of North America was contemporaneously also subject to glacial outburst floods from Glacial Lake Grantsburg, and Glacial Lake Duluth during all three phases of the last ice age.

Between 6 and 10 September 2003, a GLOF occurred from Grasshopper Glacier in the Wind River Mountains, Wyoming. A proglacial lake at the head of the glacier burst through a glacial dam, and water from the lake carved a trench down the center of the glacier for more than 0.8 kilometres (0.5 mi). An estimated 2,460,000 cubic metres (650,000,000 US gal) of water were released in four days, raising the flow level of Dinwoody Creek from 5.66 cubic metres (200 cu ft) per second to 25.4 cubic metres (900 cu ft) per second, as recorded at a gauging station 27 kilometres (17 mi) downstream. Debris from the flood was deposited more than 32 kilometres (20 mi) along the creek. The GLOF has been attributed to the rapid retreat of the glacier, which has been ongoing since the glacier was first accurately measured in the 1960s.

==== Peru ====
A flood caused by a glacial lake outburst flood on 13 December 1941 killed an estimated 1,800 people along its path in Peru, including many in the town of Huaraz. The cause was a block of ice that fell from a glacier in the Cordillera Blanca mountains into Lake Palcacocha. This event has been described as a historic inspiration for research into glacial lake outburst floods. Numerous Peruvian geologists and engineers created techniques for avoiding such floods and exported the techniques worldwide.

==== Chile ====
GLOFS are common in the Baker River watershed (Aysén Region, Patagonia, 48°S), where 23 events occurred between 2008 and 2020. Those GLOFS originate from the Northern Patagonian Icefield.

In 1982 a GLOF occurred at the confluence of the Dickson and Frías glaciers, increasing the flow in the Paine River.

In 1985 a GLOF occurred a GLOF involving the Manflas River in the Copiapó Basin in northern Chile.

==== Canada ====
In 1978, debris flows triggered by a jökulhlaup from Cathedral Glacier destroyed at Kicking Horse Pass part of the Canadian Pacific railway track, derailed a freight train and buried parts of the Trans Canada Highway.

In 1994, a jökulhlaup occurred at Farrow Creek, on the north side of Mount Farrow, British Columbia.

In 2003, a jökulhlaup drained into Lake Tuborg on Ellesmere Island, and the events and its aftermath were monitored. The ice-dammed lake drained catastrophically by floating its ice dam. This is an extremely rare occurrence in the Canadian High Arctic, where most glaciers are cold based, and ice-dammed lakes typically drain slowly by overtopping their dams.

It has been suggested that the Heinrich events during the last glaciation could have been caused by gigantic jökulhlaups from a Hudson Bay lake dammed by ice at the mouth of Hudson Strait.

== See also ==
- Altai flood – Prehistoric event in Central Asia
- Diluvium – Deposits created by outbursts of Pleistocene glacier-dammed lakes
- Jökulhlaup – Type of glacial outburst flood
- Giant current ripples – Depositional forms in channeled scablands
- Lake Ojibway
- Outburst flood – High-magnitude, low-frequency catastrophic flood involving the sudden release of water
