= Diluvium =

Deposits created by outbursts of Pleistocene glacier-dammed lakes

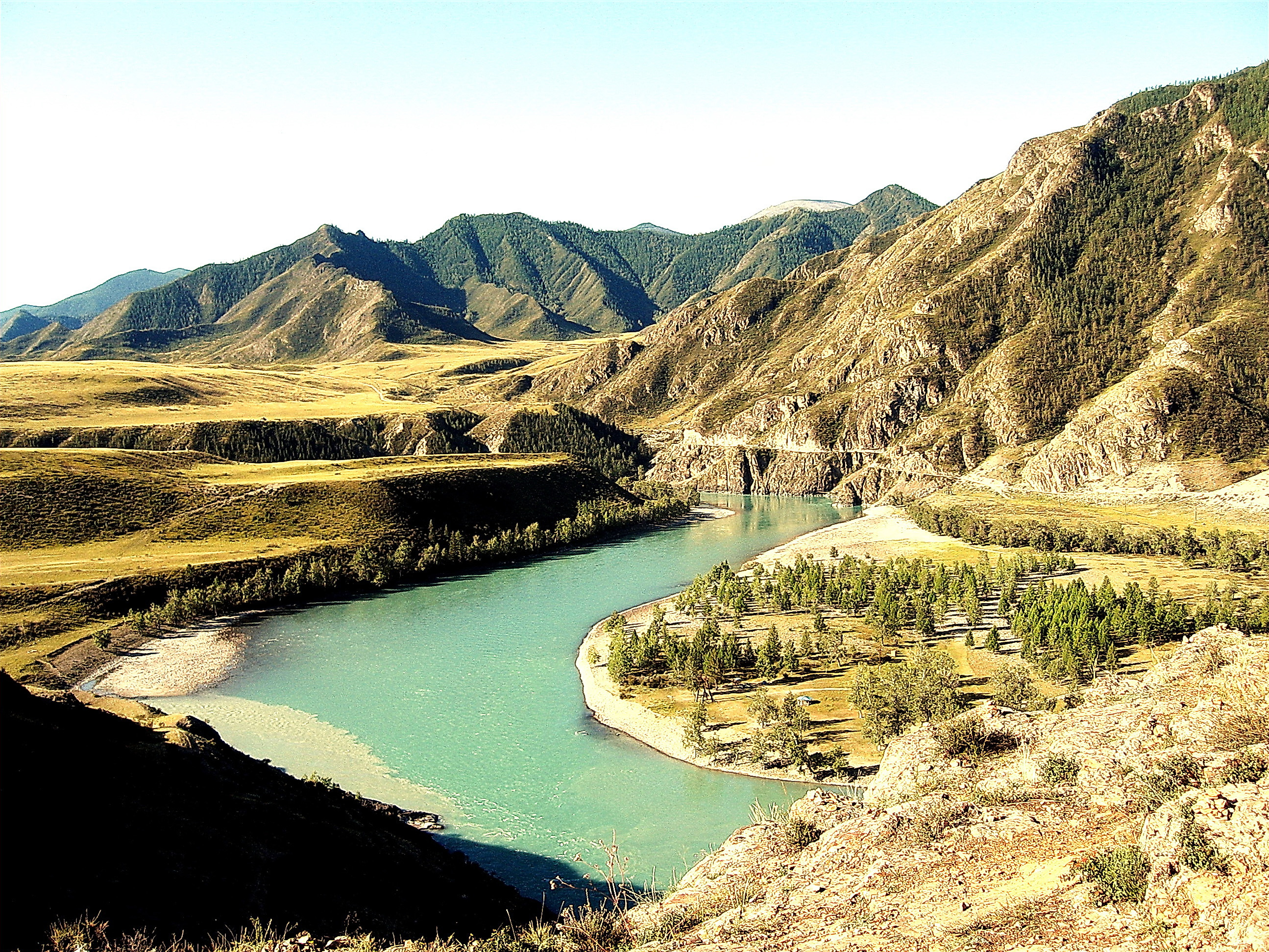
Diluvial terraces on Katun River Altai Scabland, Altai Republic

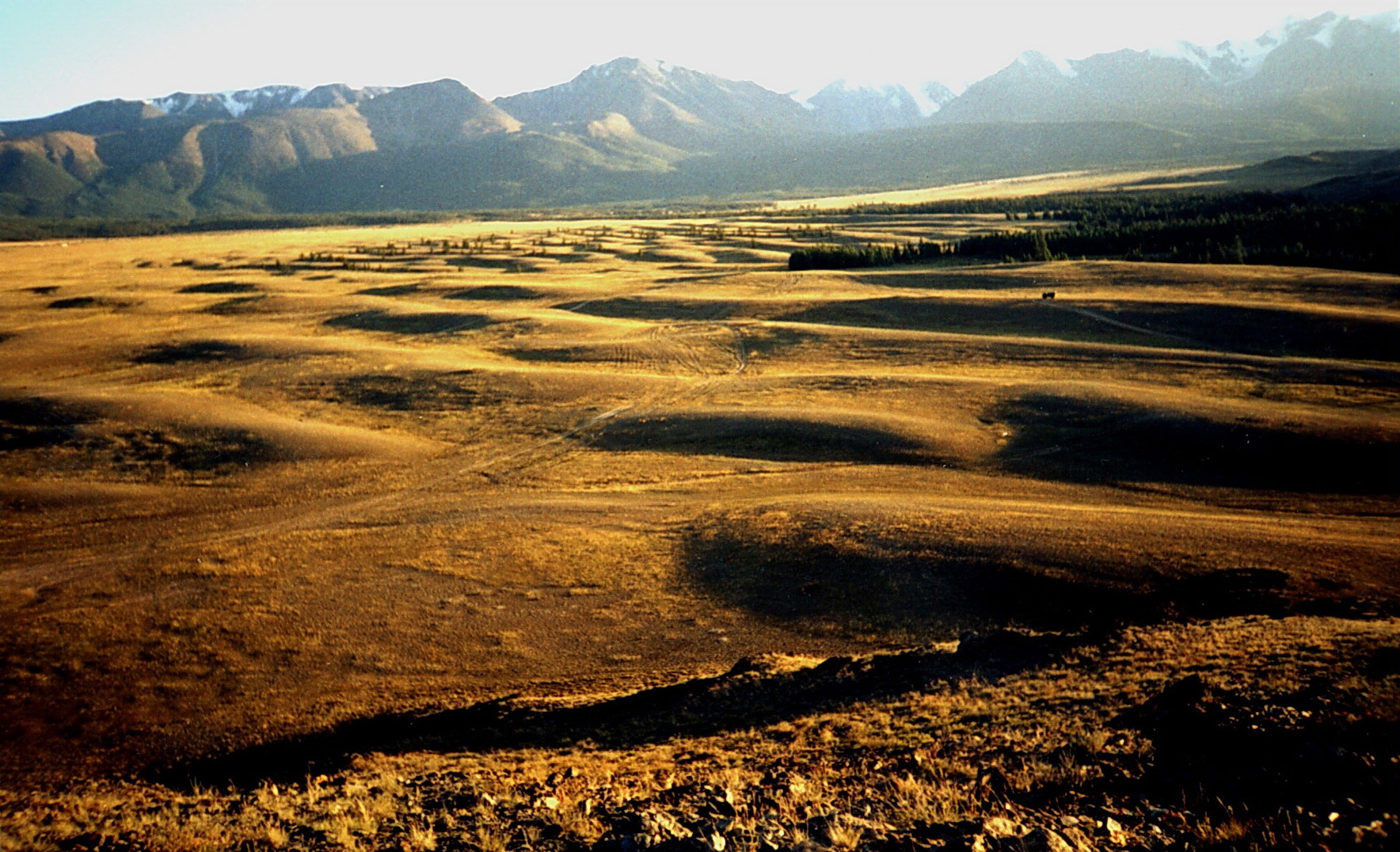
Giant current ripples in the Kuray Basin, Altai, Russia

Diluvium is an archaic term applied during the 1800s to widespread surficial deposits of sediments that could not be explained by the historic action of rivers and seas. Diluvium was initially argued to have been deposited by the action of extraordinary floods of vast extent, specifically the Noachian Flood.

In 1822 and 1823, William Buckland published the term diluvium in his monograph Reliquiae Diluvianae and in G. A. Mantel’s monograph about the geology and paleontology of the county of Sussex. Buckland divided the surficial deposits overlying regional bedrock into diluvium and alluvium. Diluvium was defined as sediments, including boulder clays, laid down by geological processes that could no longer be observed. Buckland considered the Noachian Flood to be one of these geological processes no longer in existence. "Diluvium" eventually became widely used in Europe, and was retained even into the 20th century for glacial deposits, long after the Noachian Flood explanation was quietly abandoned. Buckland defined alluvium as surficial sediments laid down by processes currently active and observable, such as those associated with existing streams and coastal environments. In Germany, diluvium was also known as the Eiszeit or Glazialzeit and alluvium was known as the Postglazialzeit. Both were grouped together in the Quartär, or Quartäre Eiszeitalter, which is equivalent to the Quaternary Period.

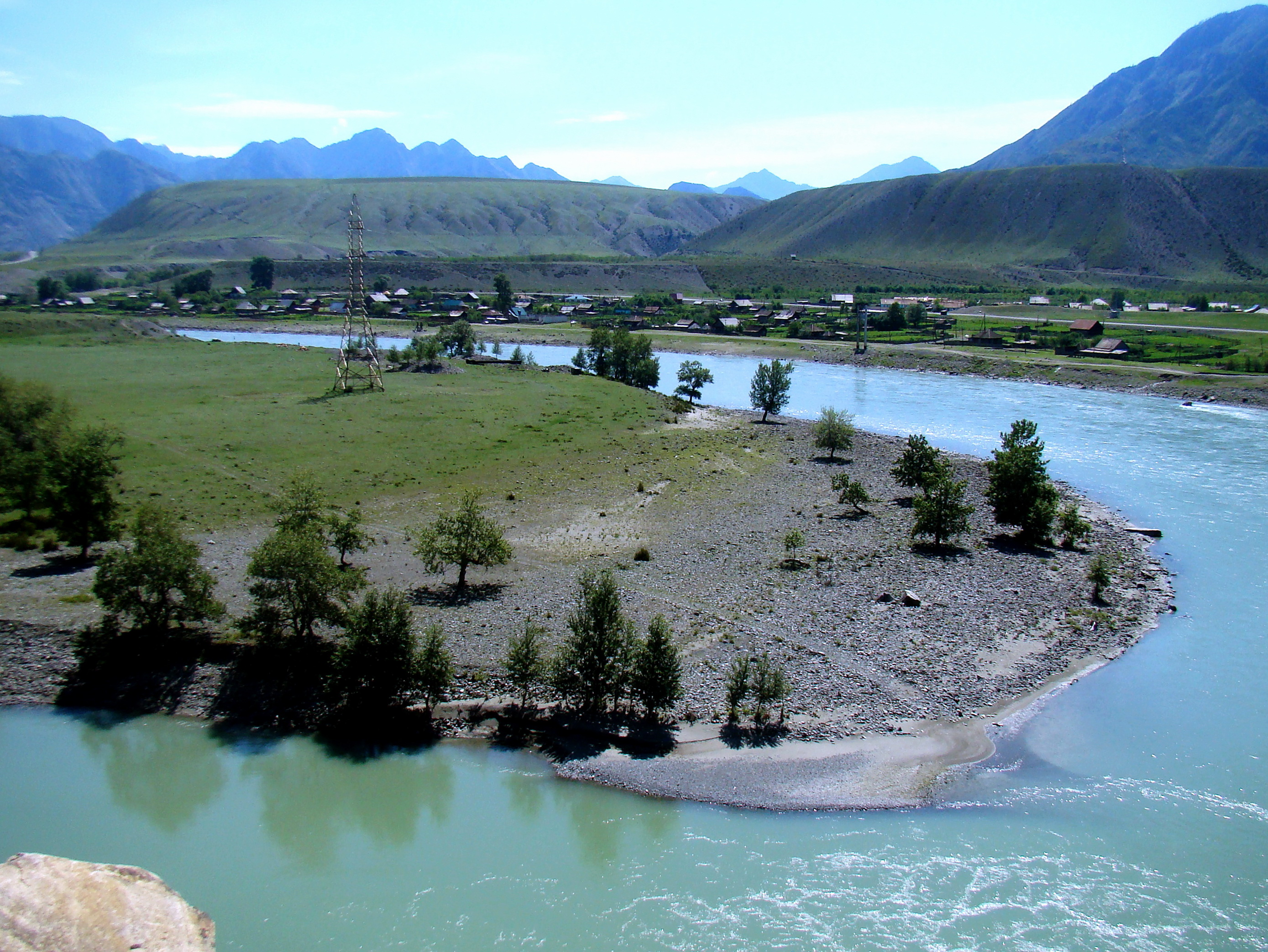
Diluvial terraces in the central Altai Mountains, Katun River, Little Yaloman Village, July 2011

In the late 20th century Russian geologist Alexei Rudoy proposed that the term "diluvium" be redefined to solely designate deposits created as a result of catastrophic outbursts of Pleistocene giant glacier-dammed lakes such as the Altai floods in the Altai Mountains. The largest of these lakes, Chuya and Kuray, had volumes of water in the hundreds of cubic kilometers, and their discharge in peak hydrograph flow rate exceeded the maximum rates of the well-known Pleistocene Lake Missoula floods in North America.

Deluvium, a slightly different spelling of diluvium, was sometimes used to designate diluvial sediments (diluvium). However, in 1888, Pavlov coined the term deluvium, with an e, to designate products of weathered and altered rocks carried by slopewash and deposited on slopes and plains. Currently, "deluvium" is used in Eastern and Central European countries like Lithuania and Poland to describe slopewash deposits.

== See also ==
- Alluvium – Loose soil or sediment that is eroded and redeposited in a non-marine setting
- Colluvium – Loose, unconsolidated sediments deposited at the base of a hillslope
- Eluvium – End product of rock weathering
- Giant current ripples – Depositional forms in channeled scablands
- Illuvium – Material displaced across a soil profile
