= Outburst flood =

High-magnitude, low-frequency catastrophic flood involving the sudden release of water

In geomorphology, an outburst flood—a type of megaflood—is a high-magnitude, low-frequency catastrophic flood involving the sudden release of a large quantity of water. During the last deglaciation, numerous glacial lake outburst floods were caused by the collapse of either ice sheets or glaciers that formed the dams of proglacial lakes. Examples of older outburst floods are known from the geological past of the Earth and inferred from geomorphological evidence on Mars. Landslides, lahars, and volcanic dams can also block rivers and create lakes, which trigger such floods when the rock or earthen barrier collapses or is eroded. Lakes also form behind glacial moraines or ice dams, which can collapse and create outburst floods.

== Definition and classification ==
Megafloods are paleofloods (prehistoric floods) that involved rates of water flow larger than those in the historical record. They are studied through the sedimentary deposits and the erosional and constructional landforms that individual megafloods have created. Floods that are known to us through historical descriptions are mostly related to meteorological events, such as heavy rains, rapid melting of snowpacks, or combination of these. In the geological past of the Earth, however, geological research has shown that much larger events have occurred. In the case of outburst floods, such floods are typically linked to the collapse of a barrier which formed a lake. They fall in the following classification according to the mechanism responsible:

- Collapse of glacier dams that impound proglacial lakes (Missoula Floods).
- Rapid erosion, melting of ice sheets (jökulhlaups).
- Collapse of earthen barriers (landslides or glacial moraines).
- Collapse of volcanic dams created by lava flows, lahars, or pyroclastic flows.
- Overtopping of earthen or rock barriers
  - Lake overtopping (e.g., Lake Bonneville).
  - Ocean spilling over a dividing ridge into a landlocked basin (e.g., Zanclean flood and Black Sea flood). A smaller scale example would be the Pantai Remis landslide.

== Examples ==
Examples where evidence for large ancient water flows has been documented or is under scrutiny include:

=== Overflow of lakes formed by landslides ===
An example is the lake overflow that caused one of the worst landslide-related disasters in history on June 10, 1786. A landslide dam on Sichuan's Dadu River, created by an earthquake ten days earlier, burst and caused a flood that extended 1,400 km (870 mi) downstream and killed 100,000 people.

=== Postglacial rebound ===
Postglacial rebound changes the tilt of ground. In lakes, this means that shores sink in the direction farther away from the former maximum depth of ice. When the lake rests against an esker, water pressure increases with the increased depth. The esker may then fail under the load and burst, creating a new outflow. Lake Pielinen in Finland is an example of this.

=== Tectonic basins ===
==== Black Sea (around 7,600 years ago) ====
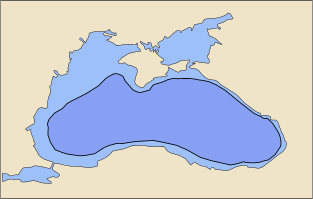
Black Sea today (light blue) and in 5600 BC (dark blue) according to Ryan's and Pitman's theories

A rising sea flood, the proposed and much-discussed refilling of the freshwater glacial Black Sea with water from the Aegean, has been described as "a violent rush of salt water into a depressed fresh-water lake in a single catastrophe that has been the inspiration for the flood mythology" (Ryan and Pitman, 1998). The marine incursion, caused by the rising level of the Mediterranean, apparently occurred around 7,600 years ago. It remains an active subject of debate among geologists, with subsequent evidence discovered to both support and refute the existence of the flood, while the theory that it is the basis of later flood myths is not proven.

==== Persian Gulf Flood (24,000 to 14,000 years ago, or 12,000 to 10,000 years ago) ====
Flooding of this area scattered peoples to both sides of the gulf depression. It was an area fed by four rivers, which formed the ancient Ur Schatt river. Rose calls it the "Gulf Oasis" which may have been a demographic refuge fed by the Tigris, Euphrates, Karun, and Wadi al-Batin rivers. It was suggested to be an area of freshwater springs and rivers.

==== Glacial floods in North America (15,000 to 8,000 years ago) ====
In North America, during glacial maximum, there were no Great Lakes as we know them, but "proglacial" (ice-frontage) lakes formed and shifted. They lay in the areas of the modern lakes, but their drainage sometimes passed south, into the Mississippi system; sometimes into the Arctic, or east into the Atlantic. The most famous of these proglacial lakes was Lake Agassiz. As ice-dam configurations failed, a series of great floods were released from Lake Agassiz, resulting in massive pulses of freshwater added to the world's oceans.

The Missoula Floods of Oregon and Washington states were also caused by breaking ice dams, resulting in the Channeled Scablands.

Lake Bonneville, a pluvial lake, burst catastrophically in the Bonneville Flood about 14,500 years ago, due to its water overflowing and washing away a sill composed of two opposing alluvial fans which had blocked a gorge. Lake Bonneville was not a glacial lake, but glacial age climate change determined the lake level and its overflow. The first scientific report of a megaflood (Gilbert, 1890) describes this event.

The last of the North American proglacial lakes, north of the present Great Lakes, has been designated Glacial Lake Ojibway by geologists. It reached its largest volume around 8,500 years ago, when joined with Lake Agassiz. But its outlet was blocked by the great wall of the glaciers and it drained by tributaries, into the Ottawa and St. Lawrence Rivers far to the south. About 8,300 to 7,700 years ago, the melting ice dam over Hudson Bay's southernmost extension narrowed to the point where pressure and its buoyancy lifted it free, and the ice-dam failed catastrophically. Lake Ojibway's beach terraces show that it was 250 metres (820 ft) above sea level. The volume of Lake Ojibway is commonly estimated to have been about 163,000 km^{3} (39,000 cu mi), more than enough water to cover a flattened-out Antarctica with a sheet of water 10 metres (33 ft) deep. That volume was added to the world's oceans in a matter of months.

The detailed timing and rates of change after the onset of melting of the great ice-sheets are subjects of continuing study.

==== The Caspian and Black Seas (around 16,000 years ago) ====
A theory proposed by Andrey Tchepalyga of the Russian Academy of Sciences dates the flooding of the Black Sea basin to an earlier time and from a different cause. According to Tchepalyga, global warming beginning from about 16,000 BP caused the melting of the Scandinavia Ice Sheet, resulting in massive river discharge that flowed into the Caspian Sea, raising it to as much as 50 metres (160 ft) above normal present-day levels. The Sea of Azov rose so high that it overflowed into the Caspian Sea. The rise was extremely rapid and the Caspian basin could not contain all the floodwater, which flowed from the northwest coastline of the Caspian Sea, through the Kuma-Manych Depression and Kerch Strait into the Black Sea basin. By the end of the Pleistocene this would have raised the level of the Black Sea by some 60 to 70 metres (200 to 230 ft) 20 metres (66 ft) below its present-day level, flooding large areas that were formerly available for settlement or hunting. Tchepalyga suggests this may have formed the basis for legends of the great Deluge.

==== Red Sea floods ====
The barrier across Bab-el-Mandeb, between Ethiopia and Yemen, seems to have been the source of outbreak flooding similar to that found in the Mediterranean. The Lake Toba event, approximately between 69,000 and 77,000 years ago, caused a massive drop in sea levels, exposing the barrier and enabling modern Homo sapiens to leave Africa via a route other than Sinai. The finding of saline evaporites on the floor of the Red Sea confirms that this dam has functioned at various periods in the past. Rising sea levels during the Flandrian transgression (and in earlier interglacial periods) suggest that this area may have been subject to outburst flooding.

==== English Channel floods ====
Originally there was an isthmus across the Strait of Dover. During an earlier glacial maximum, the exit from the North Sea was blocked to the north by an ice dam, and the water flowing out of rivers backed up into a vast lake with freshwater glacial melt on the bed of what is now the North Sea. A gently upfolding chalk ridge linking the Weald of Kent and Artois, perhaps some 30 metres (100 feet) higher than the current sea level, contained the glacial lake at the Strait of Dover. At some time, probably around 425,000 years ago and again around 225,000 years later, the barrier failed or was overtopped, loosing a catastrophic flood that permanently diverted the Rhine into the English Channel and replacing the "Isthmus of Dover" watershed by a much lower watershed running from East Anglia east then southeast to the Hook of Holland and (as at modern sea level) separated Britain from the continent of Europe; a sonar study of the sea bed of the English Channel published in Nature, July 2007, revealed the discovery of unmistakable marks of a megaflood on the English Channel seabed: deeply eroded channels and braided features have left the remnants of streamlined islands among deeply gouged channels where the collapse occurred.

==== Refilling of the Mediterranean Sea (5.3 million years ago) ====
A catastrophic flood refilled the Mediterranean Sea 5.3 million years ago, at the beginning of the Zanclean age that ended the Messinian salinity crisis. The flood occurred when Atlantic waters found their way through the Strait of Gibraltar into the desiccated Mediterranean basin, following the Messinian salinity crisis during which it repeatedly became dry and re-flooded, dated by consensus to before the emergence of modern humans.

The Mediterranean did not dry out during the most recent glacial maximum. Sea level during glacial periods within the Pleistocene is estimated to have dropped only about 110 to 120 metres (361 to 394 ft). In contrast, the depth of the Strait of Gibraltar where the Atlantic Ocean enters ranges between 300 and 900 metres (980 and 2,950 ft).

== See also ==
- Altai flood – Prehistoric event in Central Asia
- Dam failure – Catastrophic failure of dam barrier by uncontrolled release of water
- Flood myth – Myth in which a great flood destroys civilization
- Glacial lake outburst flood – Type of outburst flood that occurs when the dam containing a glacial lake fails
- Jökulhlaup – Type of glacial outburst flood
- Lake Atna – Prehistoric lake in Alaska, formerly of Alaska
- Lake Corcoran – Former lake in the state of California, United States, formerly of California
- Missoula Floods – Heavy floods of the last ice age (Pleistocene – First epoch of the Quaternary Period megaflood)
  - Lake Missoula – Prehistoric proglacial lake in Western Montana
  - J Harlen Bretz – American geologist who discovered the Missoula Floods
- Outflow channels – Long, wide swathes of scoured ground on Mars
- Zanclean flood – Theoretical refilling of the Mediterranean Sea between the Miocene and Pliocene Epochs
- Great Flood (China) – Myth described in Chinese mythology
