= Giant current ripples =

Depositional forms in channeled scablands

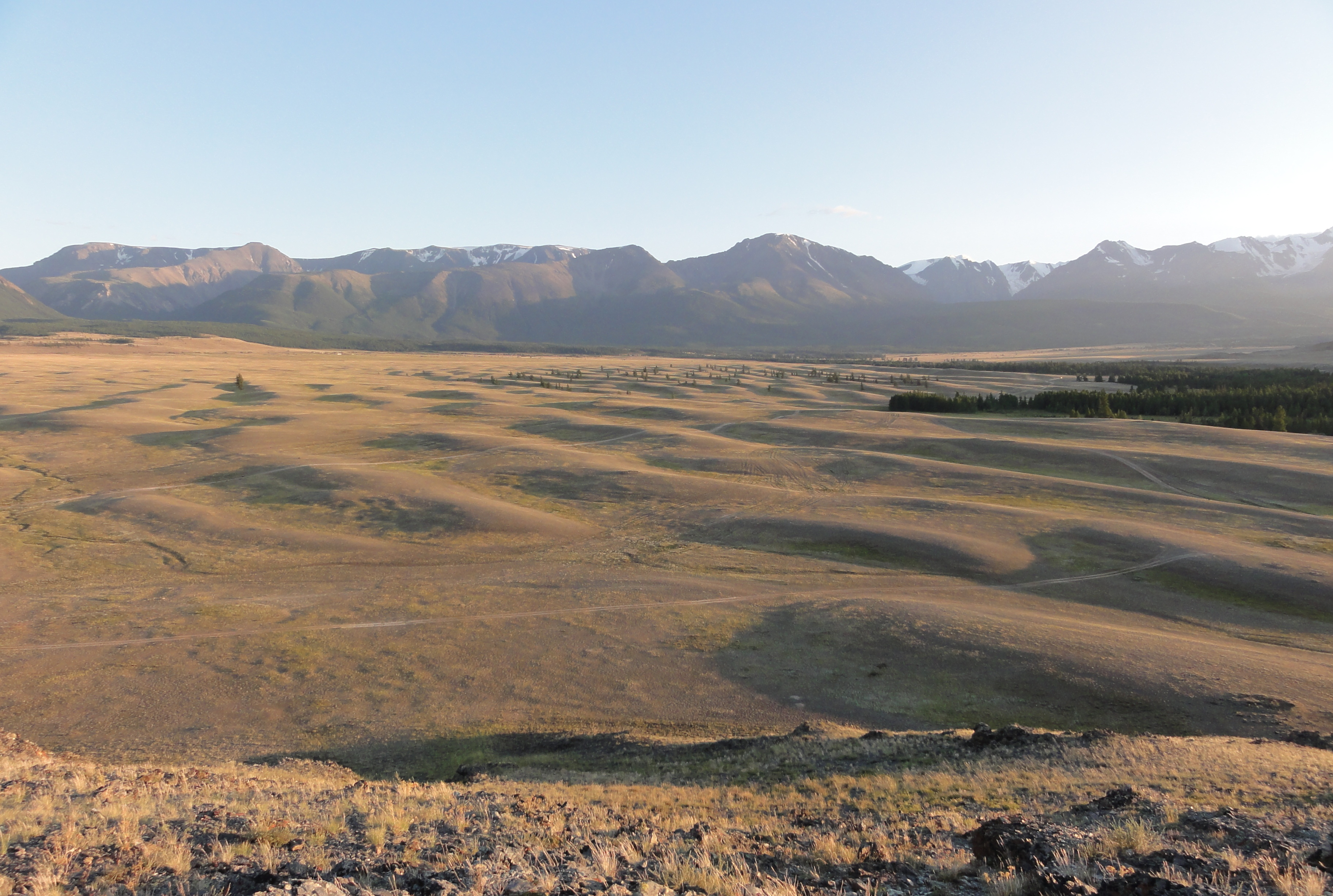
Giant ripples in the Chuya basin (Altai Mountains), one of the largest scablands on earth

Giant current ripples (GCRs), also known as giant gravel bars or giant gravel dunes, are a form of subaqueous dune. They are active channel topographic forms up to 20 m high, which occur within near-thalweg areas of the main outflow routes created by glacial lake outburst floods. Giant current ripple marks are large scale analogues of small current ripples formed by sand in streams. Giant current ripple marks are important features associated with scablands. As a landscape component, they are found in several areas that were previously in the vicinity of large glacial lakes.

== Setting ==
Giant current ripples are a geomorphological phenomenon associated with channeled scablands. Scablands form when lakes dammed off by glaciers suddenly burst through their dams and empty their contents in giant flooding events. They are found in the Altai Mountains of Russia, as well as in the Columbia Plateau of the Pacific Northwest and Coast Mountains of British Columbia and Alaska.

== Properties ==
Several common ripple shapes. Giant current ripples usually exhibit antidune breaking wave and dune ripple shapes, resulting from their high energy environments.

Giant current ripples can reach a maximum height of 20 metres (66 ft) and reach a maximum length of 1 kilometre (0.62 mi). They occur in ripple fields that can cover an area several kilometers across.

As a result of the high energy environment in which they were deposited they consist mainly of pebbles and small boulders, with a small fraction of coarse sand. Giant current ripples are whale-back shaped, with large poorly-rounded boulders found near the peak. They are oriented with the long axis perpendicular to the flow direction and with the steep flank oriented against the direction of flow. The sediment is loose and dry, without loam or silt. The larger exposed segments are cross-bedded.

While they are often called ripples, their topography responds to hydraulic flow as well as boundary conditions, which means they are more accurately described as a type of dune.

The physical parameters of the ripples, such as height and width, can be used to estimate the hydraulics of the flood (e.g., depth and speed).

== Notable localities ==
Known locations of giant ripple marks on Earth

=== North America ===
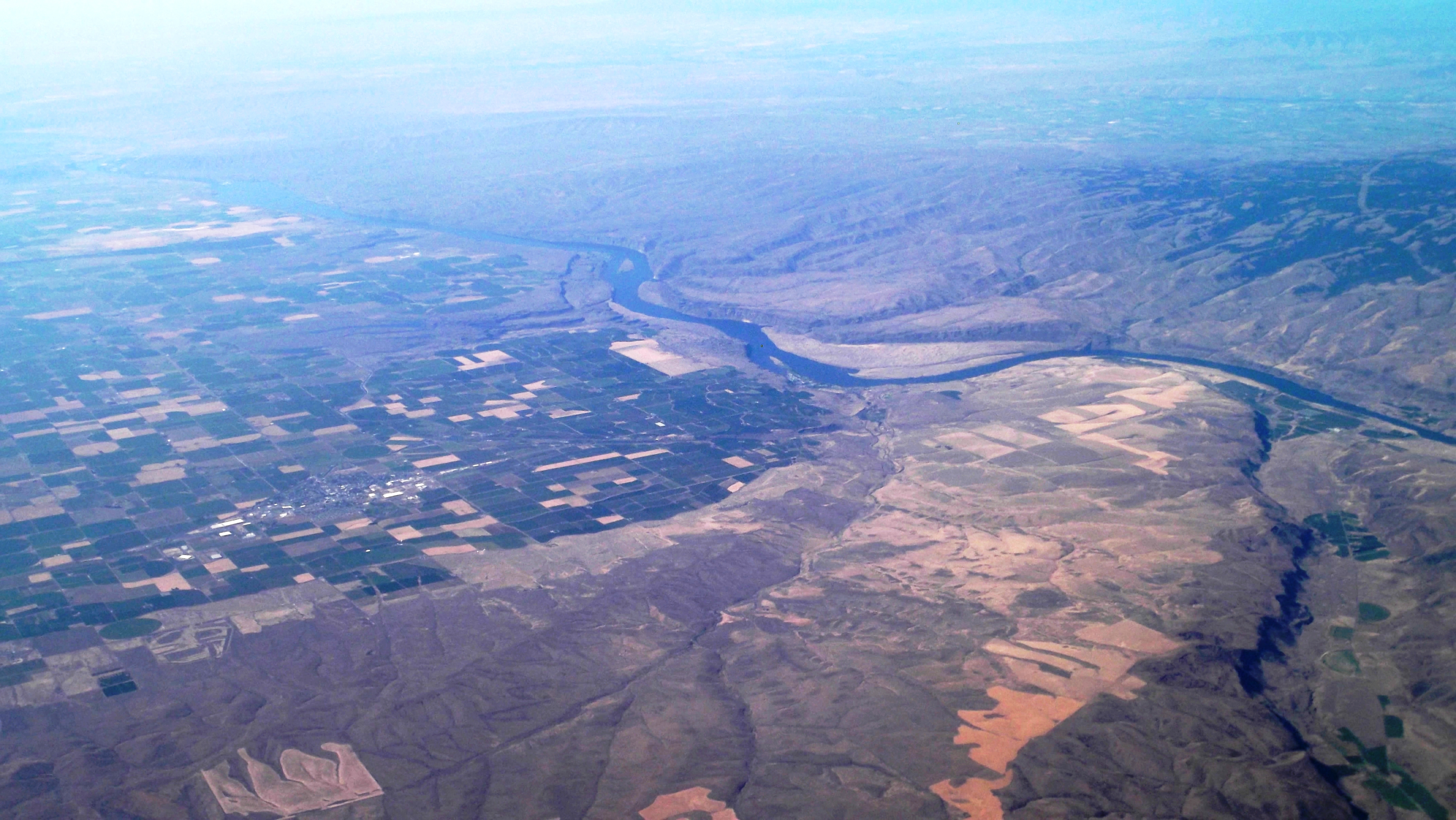
Giant current ripples along the Columbia River

Giant current ripples are an important feature of the Channeled Scablands in Washington state, U.S., which formed during the Last Glacial Maximum as a result of at least 39 glacial lake bursts, called the Missoula floods, which originated from glacial lakes Columbia in Washington and Missoula in Montana.

Giant current ripples have also been identified in the Yukon Territory, Canada, where they resulted from a 30 cubic kilometres (7.2 mi^{3}) outburst from Neoglacial Lake Alsek.

=== Altai Mountains, Russia ===
Another area where Giant current ripples are an important landscape feature is in the Altai Mountains, Russia At least seven major floods are believed to have happened in this area over a span of 150,000 years during Marine Isotope Stage 2, or the latter part of the last glaciation. The lakes that fed these events reached up to 600 km^{3} (140 cu mi) in capacity. Floodwater depths during the largest of these floods are estimated to have been up to 300 metres (980 ft) and the water would have been moving at a speed of 60 meters per second. This resulted in giant current ripple deposits of up to a hundred meters thick.

=== Mars ===
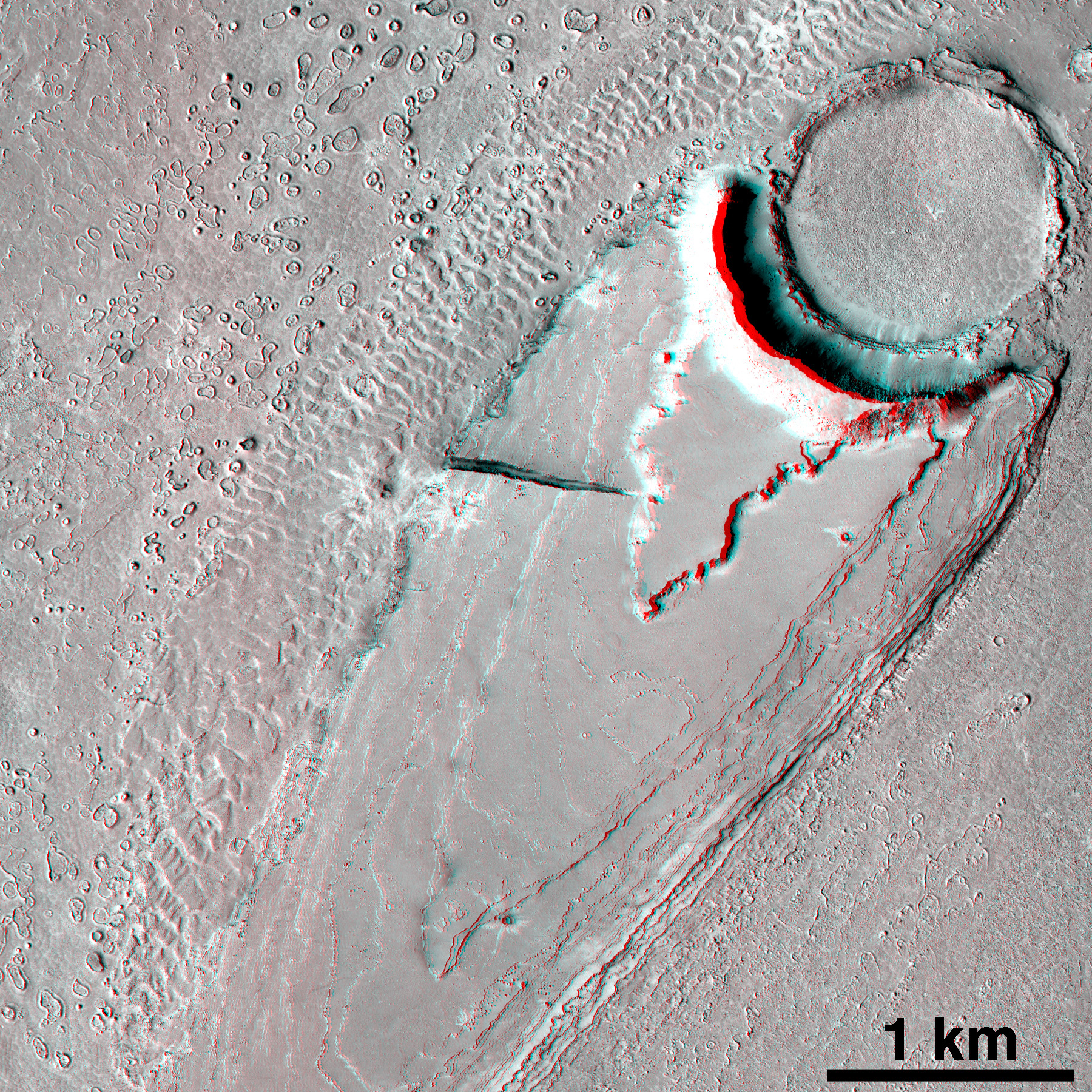
3-D Anaglyph of Giant Current Ripples in Athabasca Valles, Mars

American and British geologists and planetologists have discovered giant current ripple reliefs and other scabland features on Mars surrounding the Cerberus Fossae, indicating that megafloods have occurred there at some point in the recent past. While they have roughly the same dimensions as on earth when they occur, Giant current ripples appear to be much less common on Mars relative to other scabland features. This is likely a result of differences in the availability of certain types of sediment.
