= Jorquera River =

Location
- Country: Chile

The Jorquera River is a watercourse in the Atacama Region that originates in the foothills of the Andes give the confluence of the Turbio River, which comes from the east, and the Figueroa River, which comes from the north. and at its confluence with the Pulido River it forms the Copiapó River.

== See also ==
- List of rivers of Chile
