= Manflas River =

Location
- Country: Chile

Physical characteristics
- Mouth
  - location: Copiapó River
- Discharge
  - average: 0.46–1.32 m^{3}/s (16–47 cu ft/s)

The Manflas River is a river of the Atacama Region in Chile. It flows from South to North and empties as the Jorquera River and the Pulido River in the Copiapó River.

== See also ==
- List of rivers of Chile
