= Turbio River (Jorquera) =

Turbio

The Turbio River flows from the Cordillera Domeyko and is an affluent of the Jorquera River which is an affluent of the Copiapó River in the Atacama Region of Chile.
