= Proglacial lake =

Lake formed by the action of ice

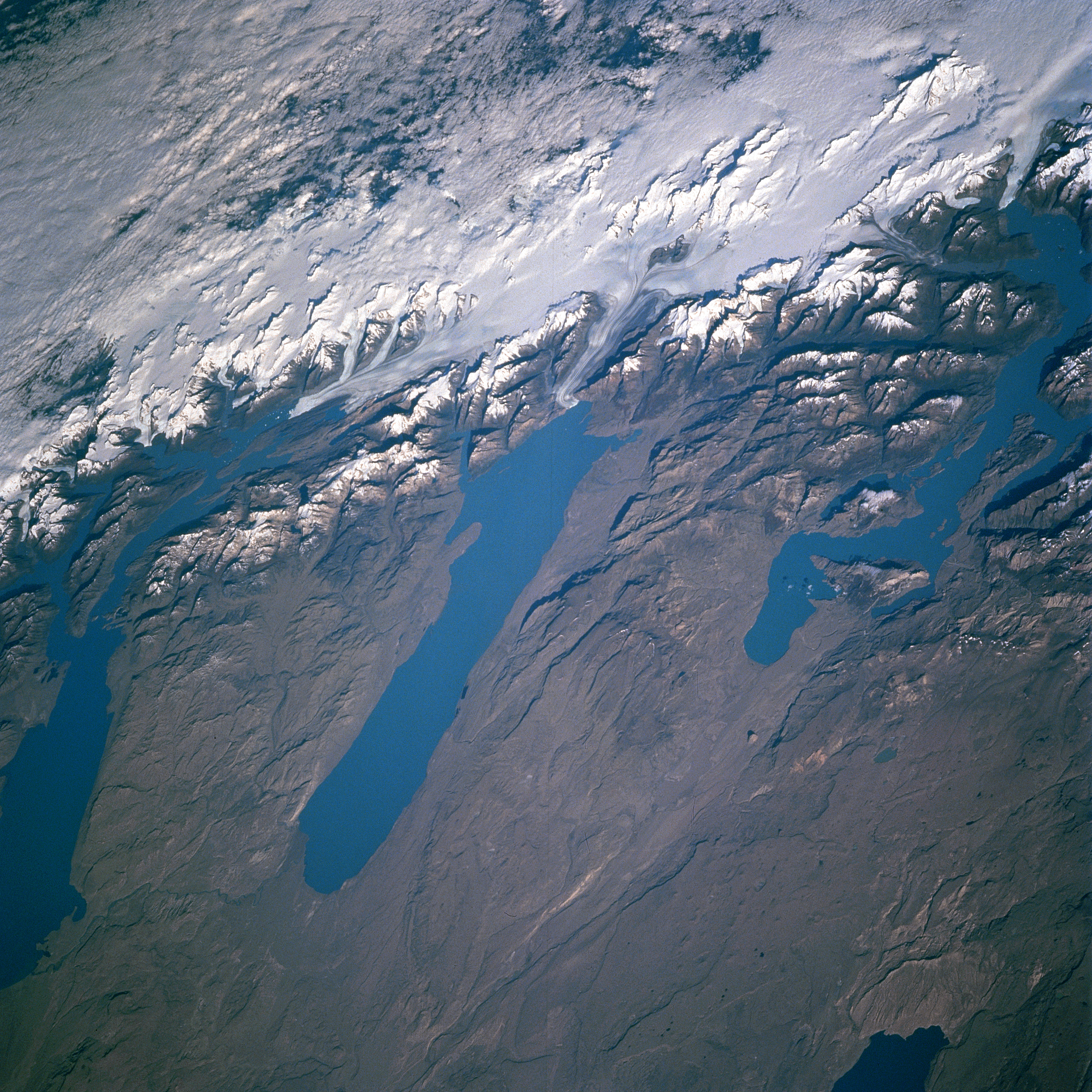
Argentinian proglacial lakes: Lago Viedma (middle), Lago Argentino (left) and Lago San Martin (right). Retreating glaciers are visible at the top.

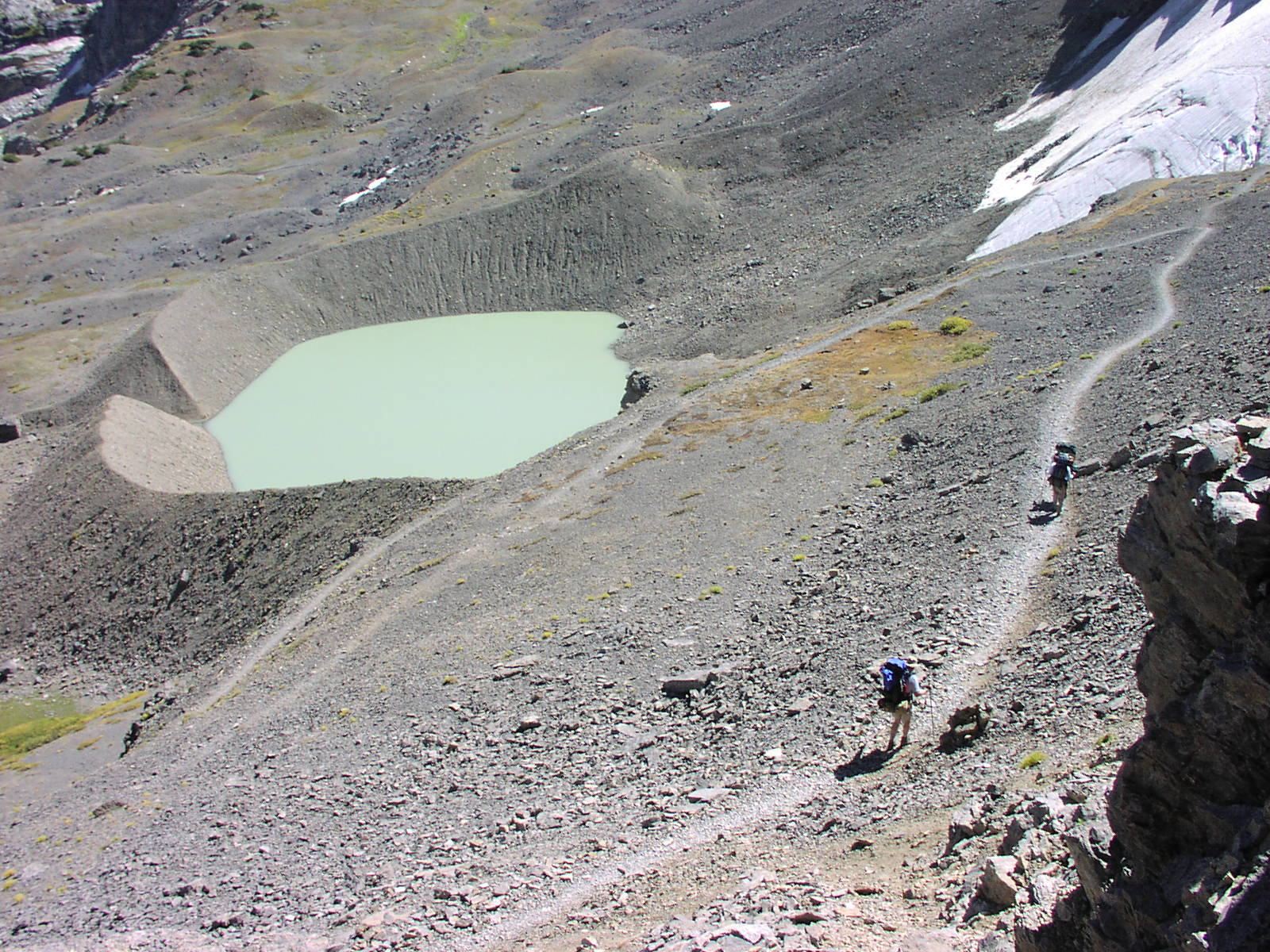
Tarn—a proglacial lake impounded by the terminal moraine of the retreating Schoolroom Glacier in Grand Teton National Park, Wyoming

In geology, a proglacial lake (ice-marginal lake), is a lake formed either by the damming action of a moraine during the retreat of a melting glacier, a glacial ice dam, or by meltwater trapped against an ice sheet due to isostatic depression of the crust around the ice. At the end of the last ice age about 10,000 years ago, large proglacial lakes were a widespread feature in the northern hemisphere. They have become an increasing feature in areas such as Greenland with potential importance in raising sea levels.

== Moraine-dammed ==
Glacial action forming a cirque to become a tarn, upon melting

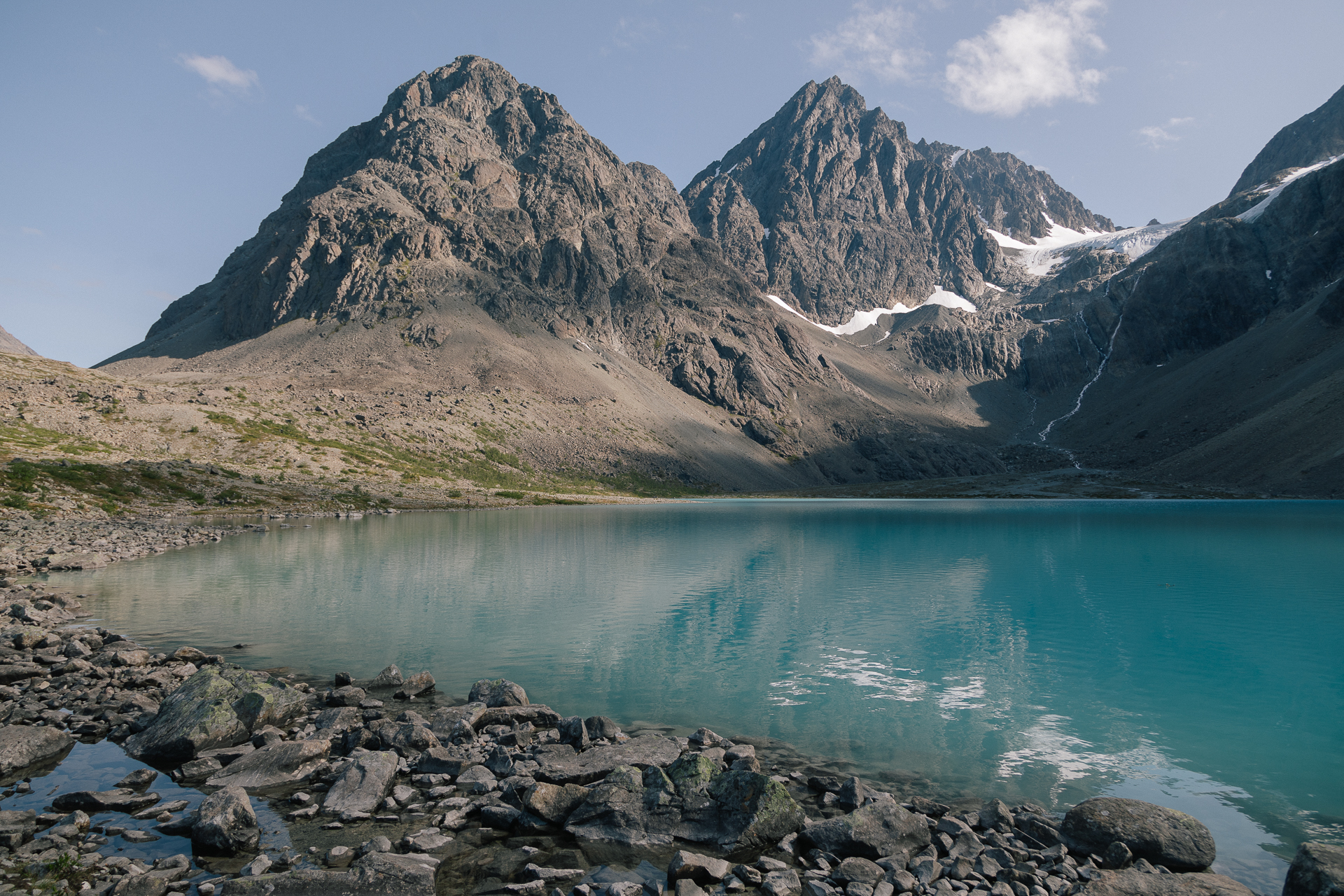
Lake Blåvatnet in Lyngen Alps, Norway located below Lenangsbreene glaciers and surrounded by several moraines formed during Younger Dryas and early Holocene

The receding glaciers of the tropical Andes have formed a number of proglacial lakes, especially in the Cordillera Blanca of Peru, where 70% of all tropical glaciers are found. Several such lakes have formed rapidly during the 20th century. These lakes may burst, creating a hazard for zones below. Many natural dams (usually moraines) containing the lake water have been reinforced with safety dams. Some 34 such dams have been built in the Cordillera Blanca to contain proglacial lakes.

Several proglacial lakes have also formed in recent decades at the end of glaciers on the eastern side of New Zealand's Southern Alps. The most accessible, Lake Tasman, hosts boat trips for tourists.

On a smaller scale, a mountain glacier may excavate a depression forming a cirque, which may contain a mountain lake, called a tarn, upon the melting of the glacial ice.

== Ice-dammed ==
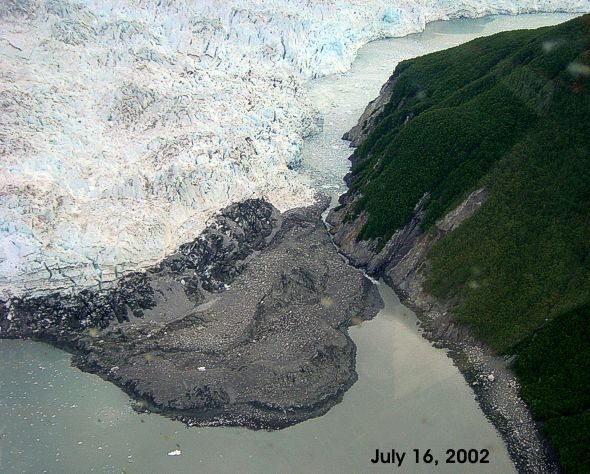
The Hubbard Glacier closed off the Russell Fjord from Disenchantment Bay in 2002 to cause the waters behind the glacier to rise 61 feet (19 m) over 10 weeks in a proglacial lake until they broke through.

The movement of a glacier may flow down a valley to a confluence where the other branch carries an unfrozen river. The glacier blocks the river, which backs up into a proglacial lake, which eventually overflows or undermines the ice dam, suddenly releasing the impounded water in a glacial lake outburst flood also known by its Icelandic name a jökulhlaup. Some of the largest glacial floods in North American history were from Lake Agassiz. In modern times, the Hubbard Glacier regularly blocks the mouth of Russell Fjord at 60° north on the coast of Alaska.

A similar event takes place after irregular periods in the Perito Moreno Glacier, located in Patagonia. Roughly every four years the glacier forms an ice dam against the rocky coast, causing the waters of the Lago Argentino to rise. When the water pressure is too high, then the giant bridge collapses in what has become a major tourist attraction. This sequence occurred last on 4 March 2012, the previous having taken place four years before, in July 2008.

About 13,000 years ago in North America, the Cordilleran Ice Sheet crept southward into the Idaho Panhandle, forming a large ice dam that blocked the mouth of the Clark Fork River, creating a massive lake 2,000 feet (600 m) deep and containing more than 500 cubic miles (2,000 km^{3}) of water. Finally this Glacial Lake Missoula burst through the ice dam and exploded downstream, flowing at a rate 10 times the combined flow of all the rivers of the world. Because such ice dams can re-form, these Missoula Floods happened at least 59 times, carving Dry Falls below Grand Coulee.

In some cases, such lakes gradually evaporated during the warming period after the Quaternary ice age. In other cases, such as Glacial Lake Missoula and Glacial Lake Wisconsin in the United States, the sudden rupturing of the supporting dam caused glacial lake outburst floods, the rapid and catastrophic release of dammed water resulting in the formation of gorges and other structures downstream from the former lake. Good examples of these structures can be found in the Channeled Scablands of eastern Washington, an area heavily eroded by the Missoula Floods.

The following table is a partial list of rivers that had glacial ice dams.

Flood/river	Location	Date	Peak discharge (10^{6} m^{3}/s)	Reference
Kuray	Altai, Russia	Late Pleistocene	18	Baker et al., 1993
Missoula	Northwestern US	Late Pleistocene	17	O'Connor and Baker, 1992
Darkhat Lakes	Mongolia	Late Pleistocene	4	Rudoy, 1998
Jassater Lakes	Altai, Russia	Late Pleistocene	2	Rudoy, 1998
Yaloman Lakes	Altai, Russia	Late Pleistocene	2	Rudoy, 1998
Ulymon Lakes	Altai, Russia	Late Pleistocene	1.9	Rudoy, 1998
Lake Regina	Canada/US	Late Pleistocene	0.8	Lord and Kehew, 1987
Wabash River	Indiana, US	Late Pleistocene	0.27	Vaughn and Ash, 1983
Lake Agassiz	Canada/US	Late Pleistocene	0.13	Matsch, 1983
Porcupine River	Alaska, US	Late Pleistocene	0.13	Thorson, 1989
Russell Fiord	Alaska, US	1986	0.10	Mayo, 1989

== Retreating ice sheet ==
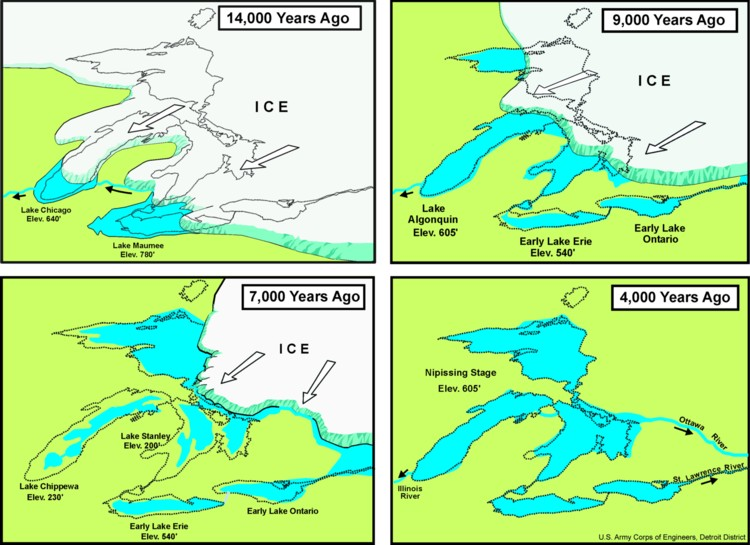
Stages of proglacial lakes in the region of the current North American Great Lakes

The retreating glaciers of the last ice age, both depressed the terrain with their mass and provided a source of meltwater that was confined against the ice mass. Lake Algonquin is an example of a proglacial lake that existed in east-central North America at the time of the last ice age. Parts of the former lake are now Lake Huron, Georgian Bay, Lake Superior, Lake Michigan and inland portions of northern Michigan. Examples in Great Britain include Lake Lapworth, Lake Harrison and Lake Pickering. Ironbridge Gorge in Shropshire and Hubbard's Hills in Lincolnshire are examples of a glacial overspill channel created when the water of a proglacial lake rose high enough to breach the lowest point in the containing watershed.

== See also ==
- Ice jam – Accumulation of ice in a river
- List of prehistoric lakes
- Proglacial lakes of Minnesota – Group of lakes in Minnesota, United States
- Pluvial lake – Landlocked basin (endorheic basin)
- Subglacial lake – Lake under a glacier
- Supraglacial lake – Pond of liquid water on the top of a glacier
- Lacustrine plain

== Bibliography ==
- Baker, V.R., Benito, G., and Rudoy, A.N., 1993. Paleo-hydrology of late Pleistocene superflooding, Altay Mountains, Siberia: Science, 259, p. 348–350.
- Lord, M.L., and Kehew, A.E., 1987, Sedimentology and paleohydrology of glacial-lake outburst deposits in southeastern Saskatchewan and northwestern North Dakota: Geological Society of America Bulletin v. 99, p. 663–673.
- Matsch, C.L., 1983, River Warren, the southern outlet of Glacial Lake Agassiz, in Teller, J.T., and Lee, Clayton, Glacial Lake Agassiz: Geological Association of Canada Special Paper 26, p. 231–244.
- Mayo, L.R., 1989, Advance of Hubbard Glacier and 1986 outburst of Russell Fiord, Alaska, U.S.A.: Annals of Glaciology, v. 13, p. 189–194.
- O'Connor, J.E., and Baker, V.R., 1992, Magnitudes and implications of peak discharges from Glacial Lake Missoula: Geological Society of America Bulletin, v. 104, p. 267–279.
- Rudoy, A., 1998, Mountain ice-dammed lakes of southern Siberia and their influence on the development and regime of the intracontinental runoff systems of North Asia in the late Pleistocene, in Benito, G., Baker, V.R., and Gregory, K.J., eds., Paleohydrology and Environmental Change: John Wiley and Sons, p. 215–234.
- Thorson, R.M., 1989, Late Quaternary paleofloods along the Porcupine River, Alaska—Implication for regional correlation, in Carter, L.D., Hamilton, T.D., and Galloway, J.P., eds., Late Cenozoic history of the interior basins of Alaska and the Yukon: U.S. Geological Survey Circular 1026, p. 51–54.
- Vaughn, D., and Ash, D.W., 1983, Paleohydrology and geomorphology of selected reaches of the upper Wabash River, Indiana: Geological Society of America Program with Abstracts, v. 15, no. 6, p. 711.
