= Pulido River =

Coordinates: 28°02′43″S 69°57′48″W

Pulido Rivers

Location
- Country: Chile

The Pulido Rivers is a watercourse in the Atacama Region that originates in the foothills near the confluence of the Vizcachas and Ramadillas rivers and one of the formative rivers of the Copiapó River.

== See also ==
- List of rivers of Chile
