= Altai flood =

Prehistoric event in Central Asia

Coordinates: 50°17′07″N 87°40′16″E

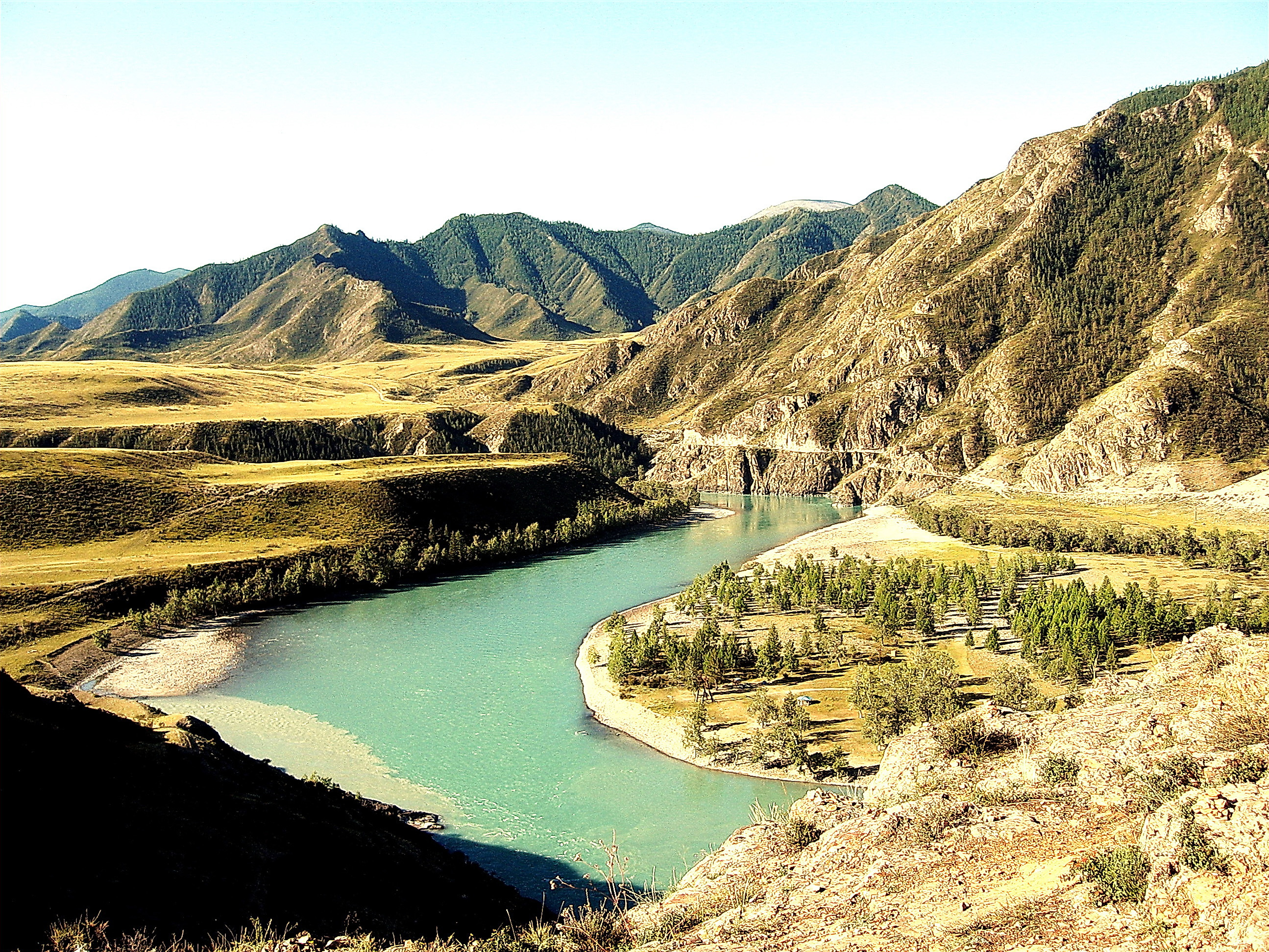
Diluvial terraces on Katun River, Altai Republic

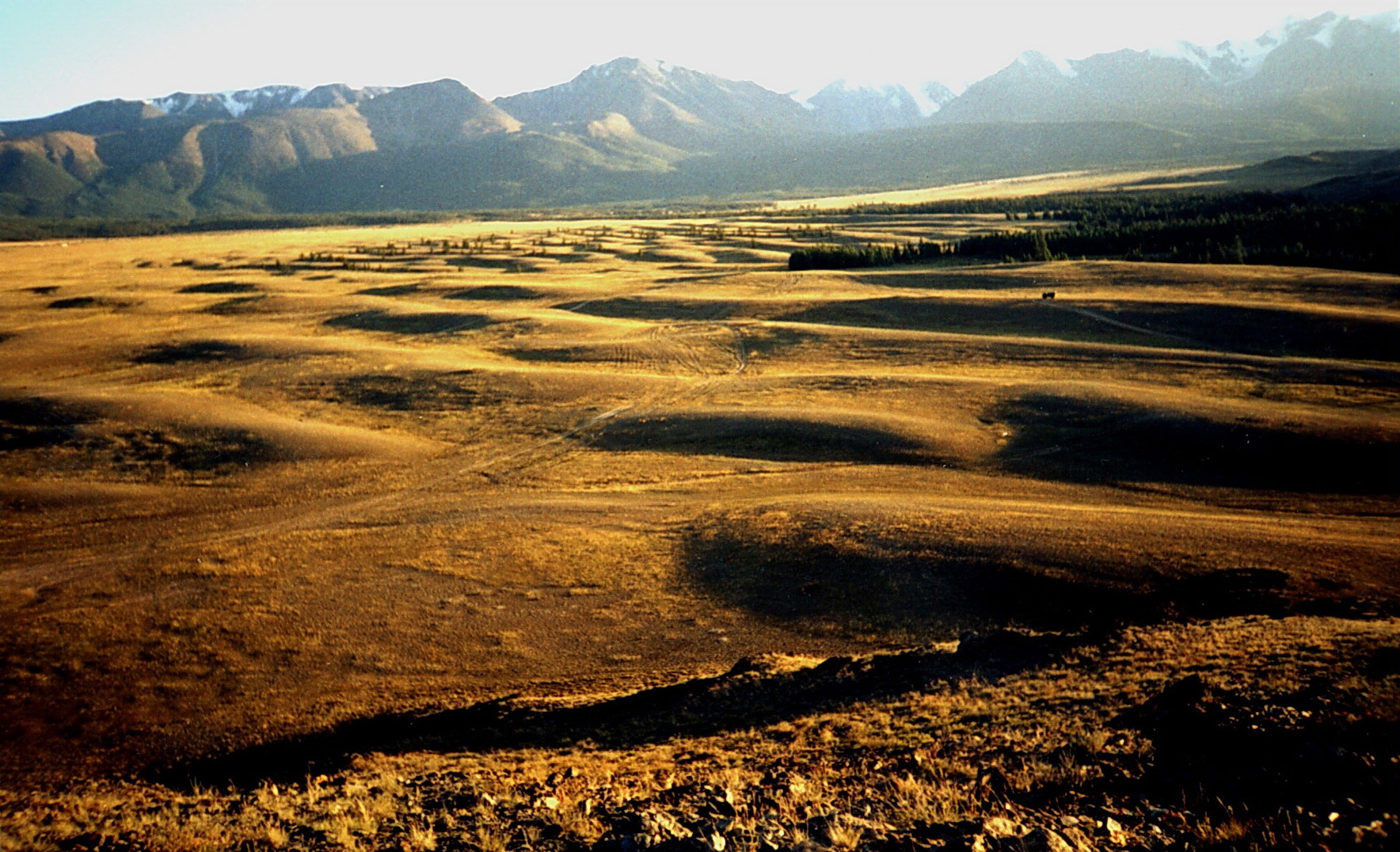
Giant current ripples in the Kuray Basin, Altai, Russia

The Altai flood refers to the cataclysmic flood(s) that, according to some geomorphologists, swept along the Katun River in the Russian Altai (Altai Republic and Altai Krai) at the end of the last ice age. These glacial lake outburst floods were the result of periodic sudden ruptures of ice dams like those triggering the Missoula floods.

== Background ==
In the US, large glacial outburst floods have been researched since the 1920s. In the 1980s, Russian geologists discovered large deposits created through similar catastrophic outbursts of Pleistocene giant glacier-dammed lakes in inter-montane basins of the Altai Mountain range. The largest of these lakes (the conjoined Chuya and Kuray) had a water volume of 600 cubic kilometers when it burst.

== Deposits ==
=== Gravel dunes ===
Giant current ripples, (gravel wave trains, gravel dunes and antidunes) up to 18 meters high and 225 meters in wavelength were created in several locations along the lake bottom. They are best developed just east of the Tyetyo River in the eastern part of the Kuray Basin, but several other smaller fields of giant current ripples also occur there. They are made up of rounded pebble gravel.

=== Giant point bars ===
Giant bars are found along the lower Chuya and the Katun rivers, rising as much as 300m above modern river levels, with lengths up to five kilometers. Well-developed on the Katun River below its confluence with the Chuya River, the bars appear to have formed as giant point bars on the inner bends of the river, paralleling the scoured bare bedrock walls of the cut bank on the outer bends. These bars diminish in height and thickness downstream to about 60 m near Gorno-Altaisk. Some of these giant point bars have formed lakes behind them where they block tributaries of the Katun river.

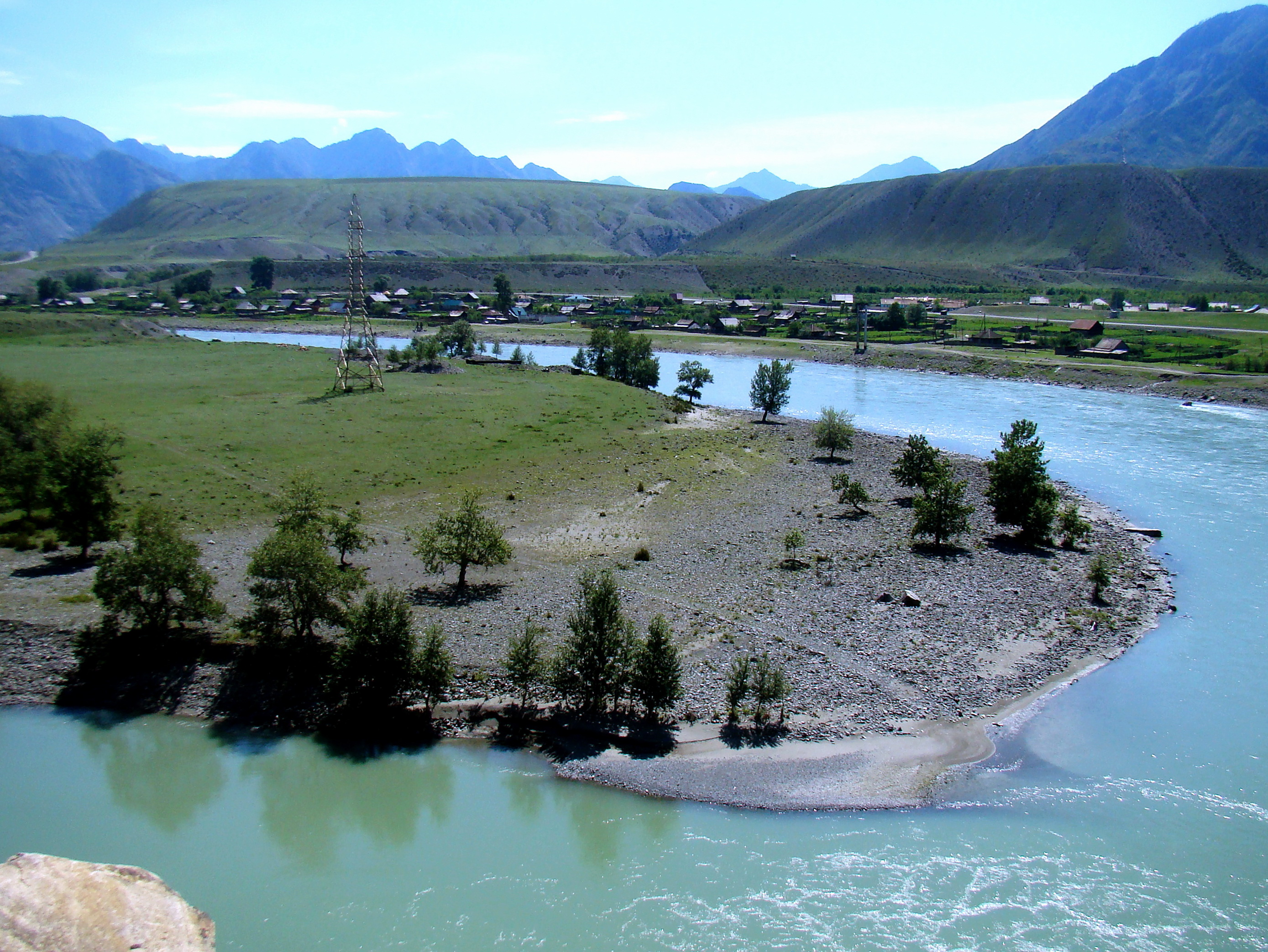
Diluvial bars in Central Altay Mountains, Katun River, Little Yaloman Village. July 2011

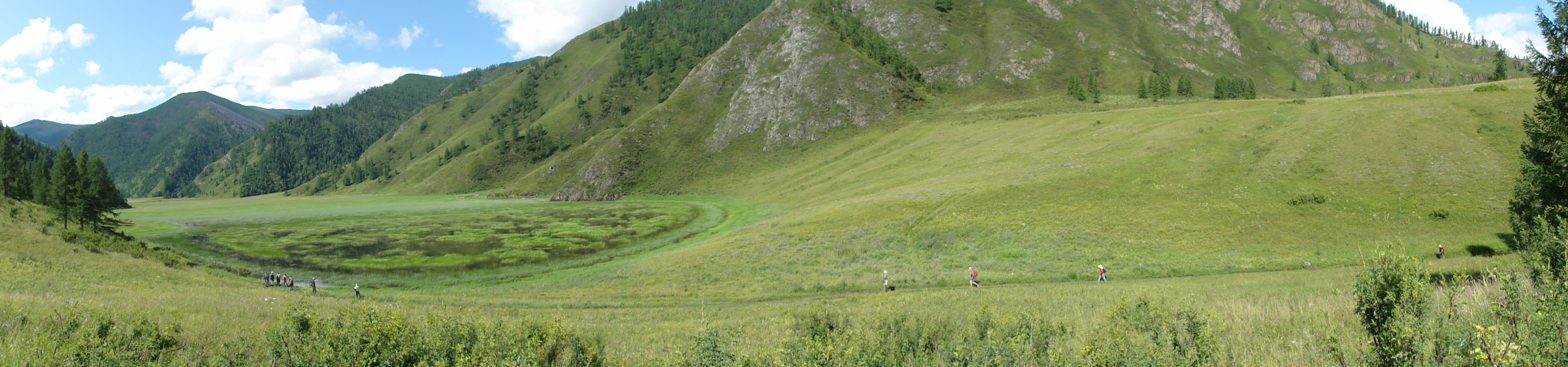
Lake (left) formed behind a gravel bar (right) deposited during the flood. The floodway along the Katun river runs behind the bar, parallel to it

=== Suspension gravels ===
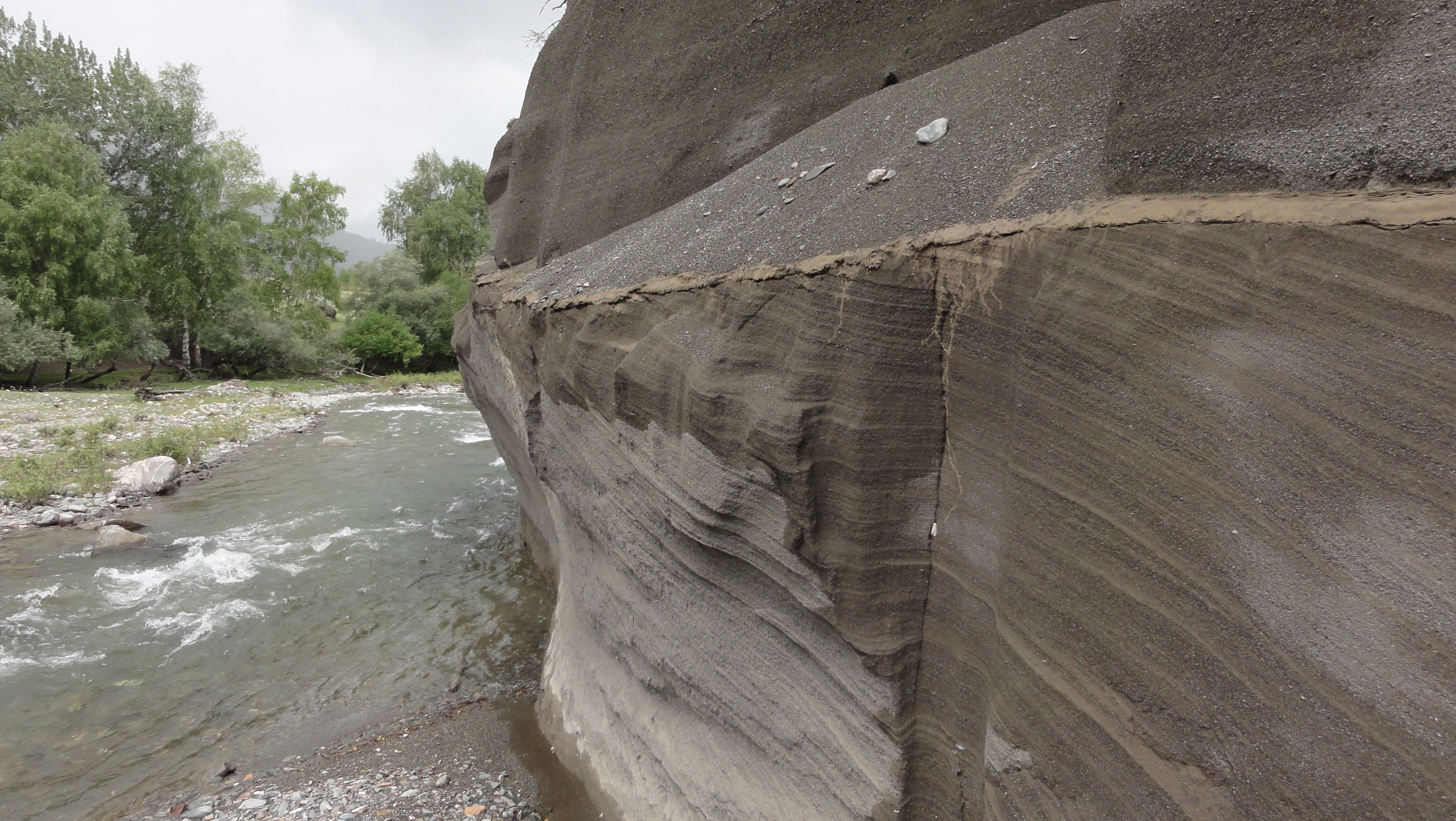
Suspension gravel deposits near the Katun River

Much of the gravel deposited along the Katun valley lacks a stratigraphic structure, showing characteristics of a deposition directly after suspension in a turbulent flow.

=== Ice-rafted blocks ===
Ice-rafted boulders up to several meters in diameter exist in the area.

=== Eddy deposits ===
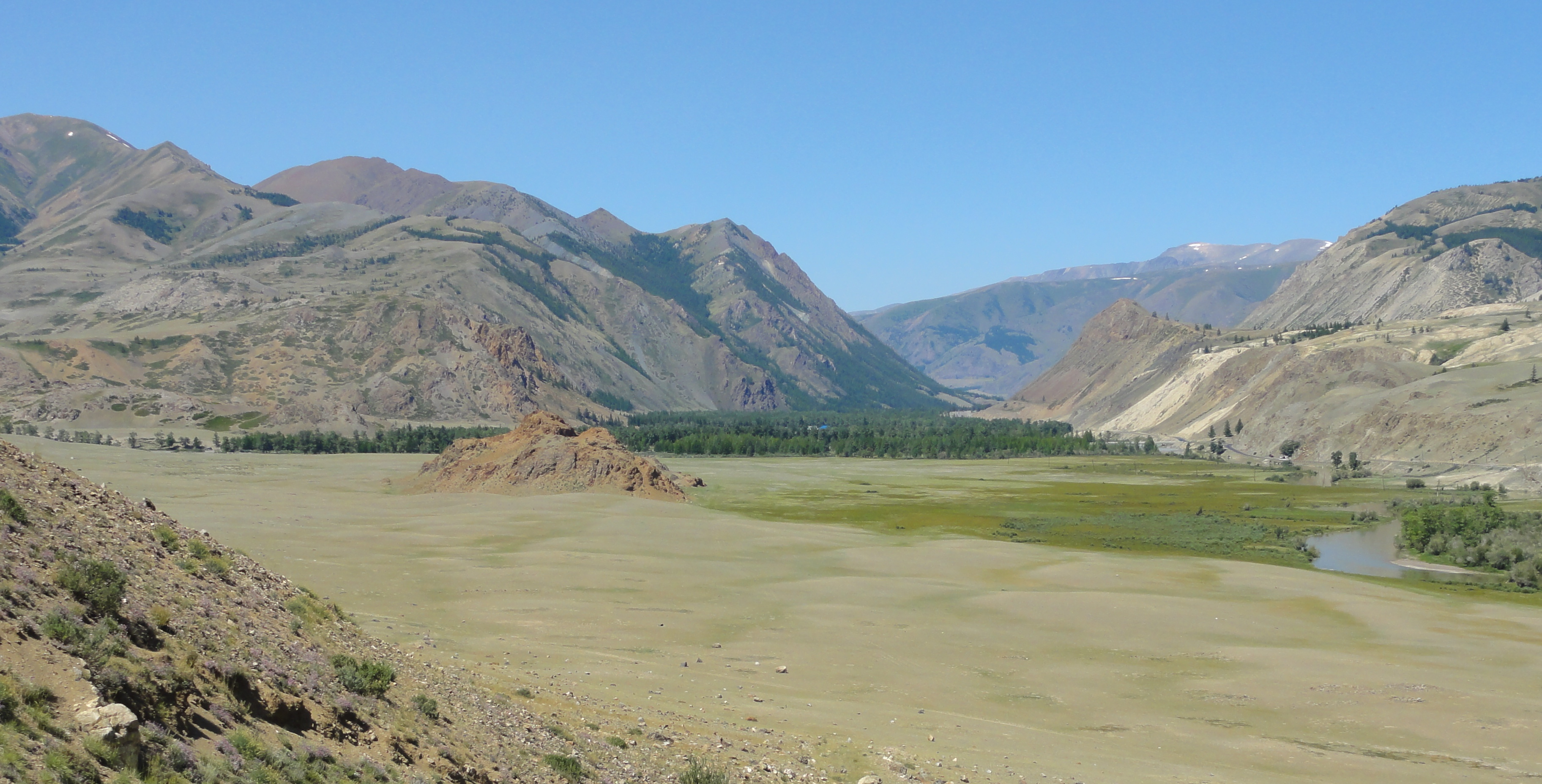
Outlet of the Chuya Basin looking in the direction of flow.

Eddy deposits are seen along the Katun River between Inya and Mali Yaloman.

== Latest research ==
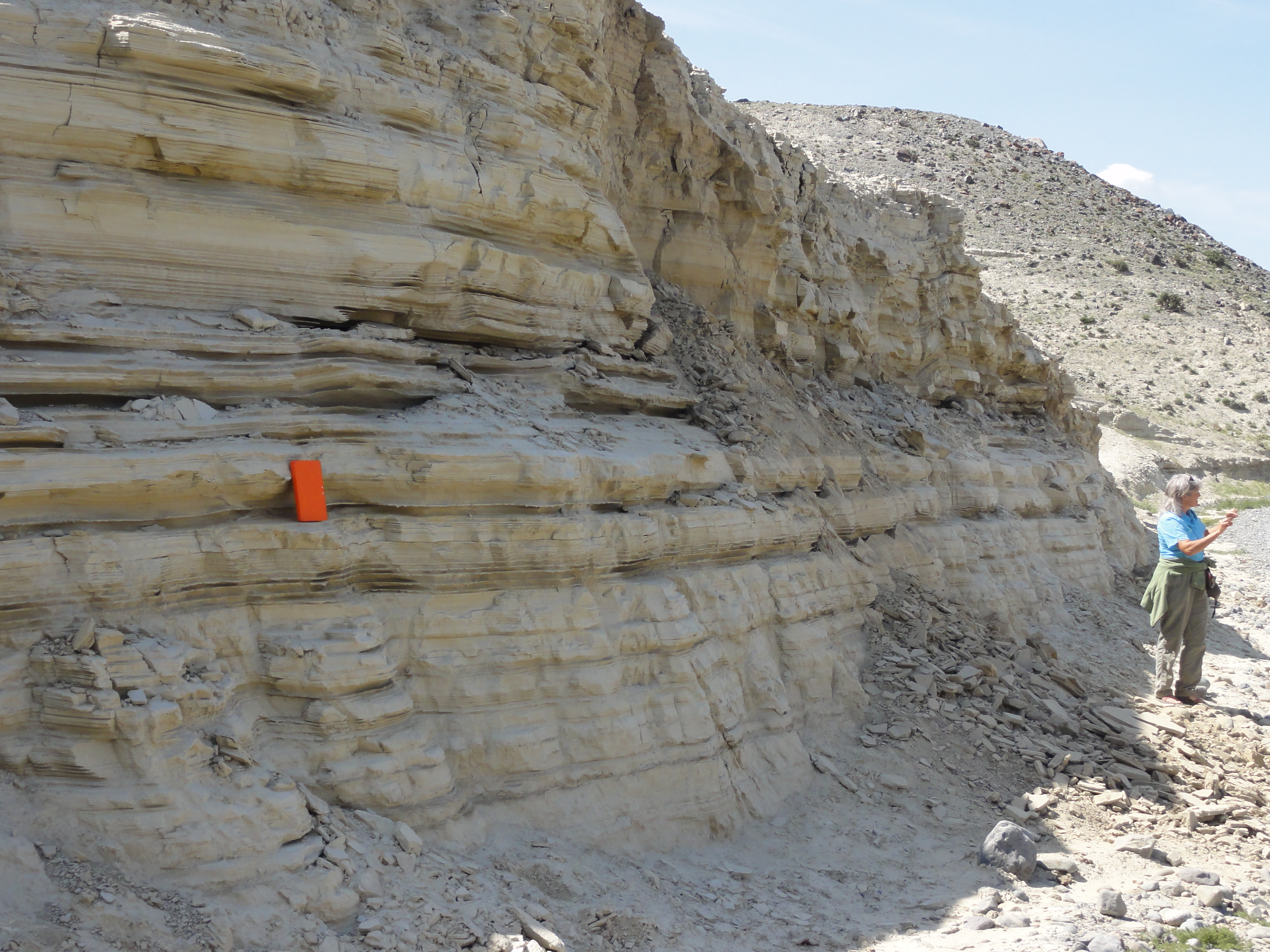
Pleistocene lake sediments in the Chuya Basin, showing possible varves (annual cyclicity)

Towards the end of the last glacial period, 12,000 to 15,000 years ago, glaciers descending from the Altai mountains dammed the Chuya River, a large tributary of the Katun River, creating a large glacial lake including the Chuya and the Kurai basins. As the lake grew larger and deeper, the ice dam eventually failed, causing a catastrophic flood that spilled along the Katun River. Its magnitude has been estimated to be similar to that of the Missoula flood in North America.

=== Timing ===
The precise timings of the several catastrophic flooding events are not tightly constrained. The mechanisms of lake filling and ice dam failure would suggest an early or late glacial time, whereas conditions at glacial maxima would seem to preclude such events. The catastrophic flood(s) occurred between 12000 BC and 9000 BC.

Most of the water discharge is thought to have occurred during one day, with peak discharges of 10^{7} m^{3}/s (Herget, 2005). The maximum lake volume was 6×10^{11} m^{3} (600 km^{3}) with an area of 1.5×10^{9} m^{2}. The ice dam was about 650 m high.

=== Flood route ===
When the ice dam failed, floodwaters coursed down the Chuya River to the confluence with the Katun River, followed the Katun into the Ob River, and then into Lake Mansi, a large proglacial Pleistocene lake, ~600,000 km^{2} in area. The fast inflow raised its level by only ~12 m but some authors argue that, because the Turgay spillway of Lake Mansi was only 8 m above the lake level at the time, much of the floodwater continued into the Aral Sea. From there the flooding waters may have followed through the Uzboy spillway into the Caspian Sea, then through the Manych spillway into the Black Sea, and eventually into the Mediterranean Sea.

== See also ==
- Giant current ripples – Depositional forms in channeled scablands
- Outburst flood – High-magnitude, low-frequency catastrophic flood involving the sudden release of water
