= Copiapó River =

River in northern Chile

Coordinates: 27°19′S 70°56′W

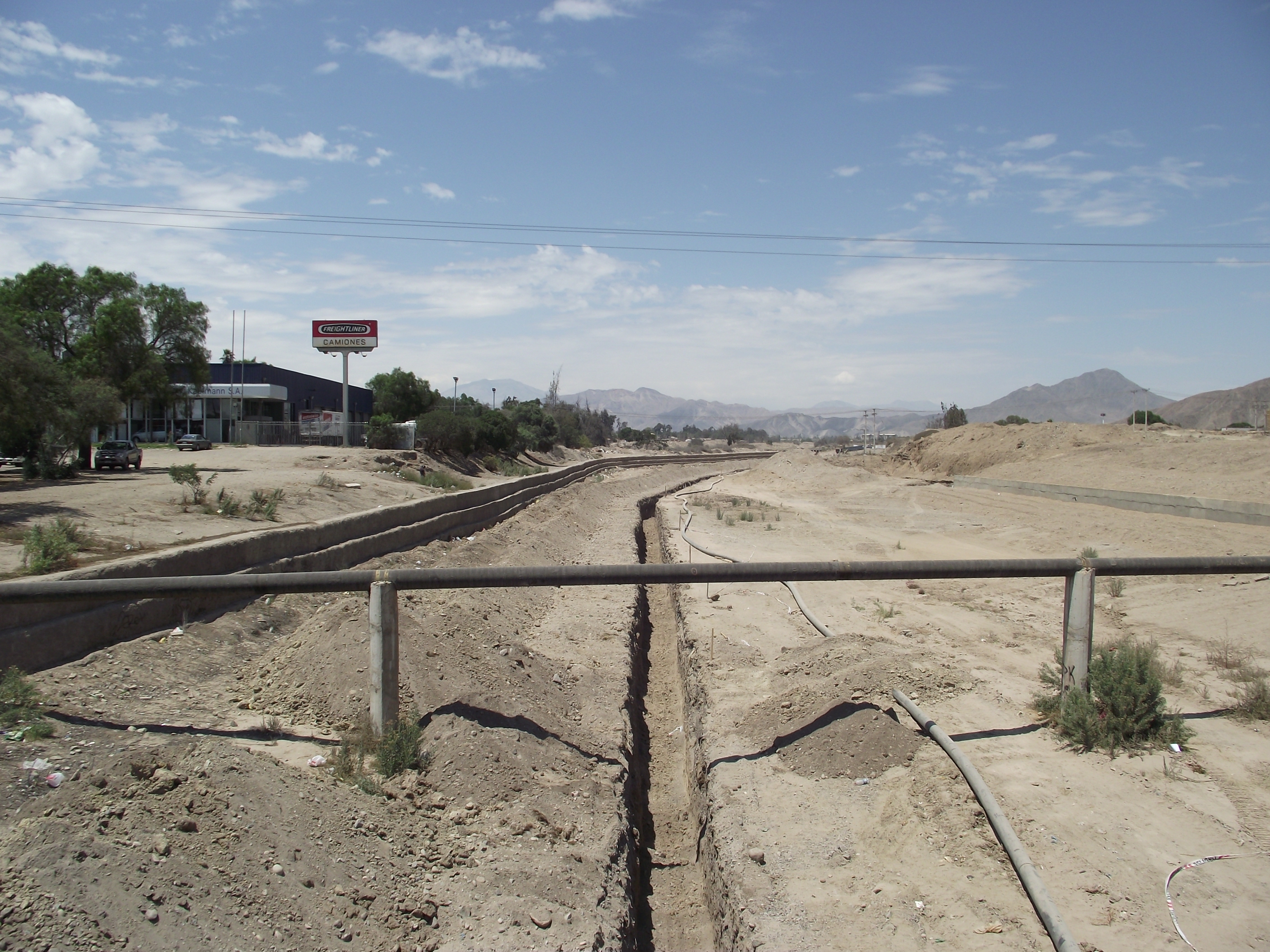
- Río Copiapó, through the city of Copiapó

Location
- Country: Chile

Physical characteristics
- Source
  - elevation: 1,230 m (4,040 ft)
- Mouth
  - location: Pacific Ocean
- Length: 162 km (101 mi)
- Basin size: 11,400 km^{2} (4,400 sq mi)
- Discharge
  - average: 3.7 m^{3}/s (130 cu ft/s)

Copiapó River is a river of Chile located in the Atacama Region. Starting at the confluence of the Jorquera and Pulido rivers, the Copiapó flows for only 2.5 km before receiving the waters of the Manflas River. It flows through the city of Copiapó.

== See also ==
- List of rivers of Chile
