= Lewis Lake =

Lewis Lake can refer to the following:

== United States ==
- Lewis Lake (Kanabec County, Minnesota)
- Lewis Lake, in Sumter Township, McLeod County, Minnesota
- Lewis Lake (Massachusetts), located in Winthrop, Massachusetts
- Lewis Lake, Minnesota, an unincorporated community in Kanabec County, Minnesota
- Lewis Lake (Wyoming), a lake in Yellowstone National Park
- Lake Lewis, a temporary lake created by the Missoula Floods

== Canada ==
- Lewis Lake, Nova Scotia, various places
- Lewis Lake (Cochrane District), Ontario
- Lewis Lake (Kenora District), Ontario
- Lewis Lake (Algoma District), Ontario
- Lewis Lake (Manitoulin District), Ontario
