= Touchet Formation =

Geological formation in Washington, US

- Stratigraphic range: Late Pleistocene (Rancholabrean); ~0.0185–0.0158 Ma
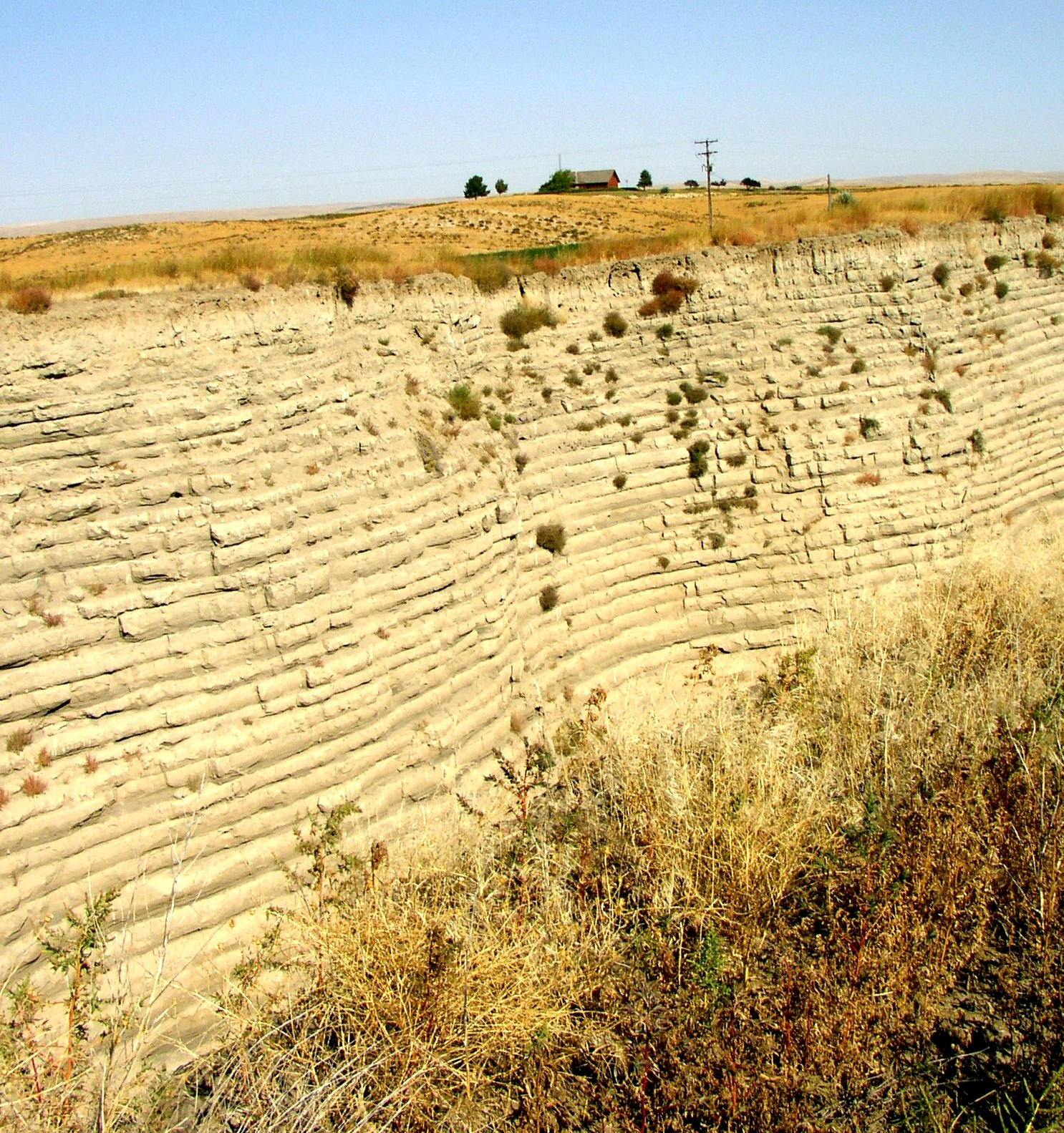
- Touchet beds in Burlingame Canyon (the "Little Grand Canyon") near Lowden in the Walla Walla valley. Note distinct layers.
- Type: Geological formation
- Underlies: Loess
- Overlies: Columbia River Basalt Group
- Area: 7,000 square miles (18,000 km^{2})
- Thickness: up to 330 feet (100 m)

Lithology
- Primary: Sediment
- Other: Basalt, loess

Location
- Coordinates: Walla Walla Basin; 46°15′49″N 120°31′00″W; Touchet Basin; 46°06′00″N 118°39′00″W; White Bluffs; 46°42′25″N 119°27′23″W; Yakima Basin; 46°20′30″N 119°27′23″W
- Region: Washington, Oregon
- Country: United States
- Extent: Columbia Basin of Western North America

Type section
- Named for: Touchet, Washington
- Named by: Foster Flint
- Year defined: 1938
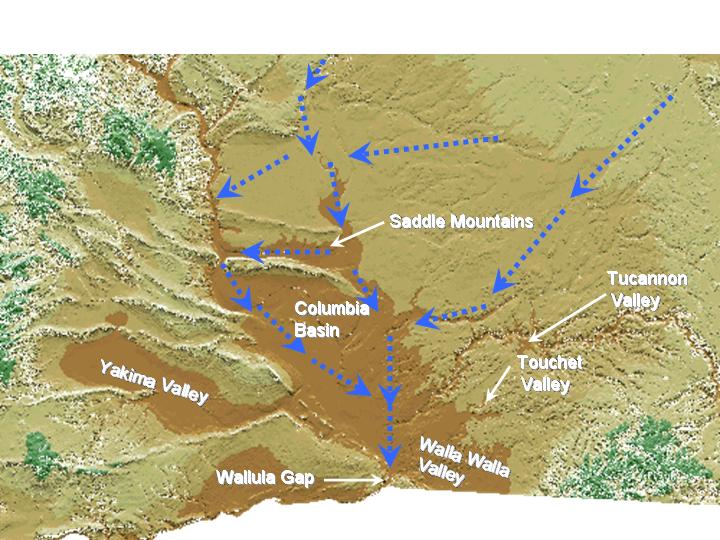
- Map showing the elevations of the Mid-Columbia region. The lowland areas in brown routinely were flooded during the Missoula Floods, creating lakes.

The Touchet Formation or Touchet beds consist of well-bedded, coarse to fine sand and silt which overlays local bedrock composed of Neogene basalt of the Columbia River Basalt Group in south-central Washington and north-central Oregon. The beds consist of more than 40 to 62 distinct rhythmites – horizontal layers of sediment, each clearly demarcated from the layer below. These Touchet beds are often covered by windblown loess which were deposited later; the number of layers varies with location. The beds vary in thickness from 330 ft (100 m) at lower elevations where a number of layers can be found to a few extremely thin layers at the maximum elevation where they are observed (1,150 ft (350 m)).

The Touchet beds are one element in a chain of evidence which helped identify and define the progression of the Missoula Floods, which occurred around 18,400 to 15,700 calendar years ago. During the floods, flow through the Wallula Gap was slow enough such that water pooled in a temporary lake, Lake Lewis. Lake Lewis back-flooded up the Yakima, Walla Walla, Touchet and Tucannon River Valleys. In these relatively calm arms of the lake, the slack waters deposited the suspended materials eroded from the scabland regions north of Lake Lewis, and redeposited them in pronounced layers before receding.

== Discovery and interpretation ==
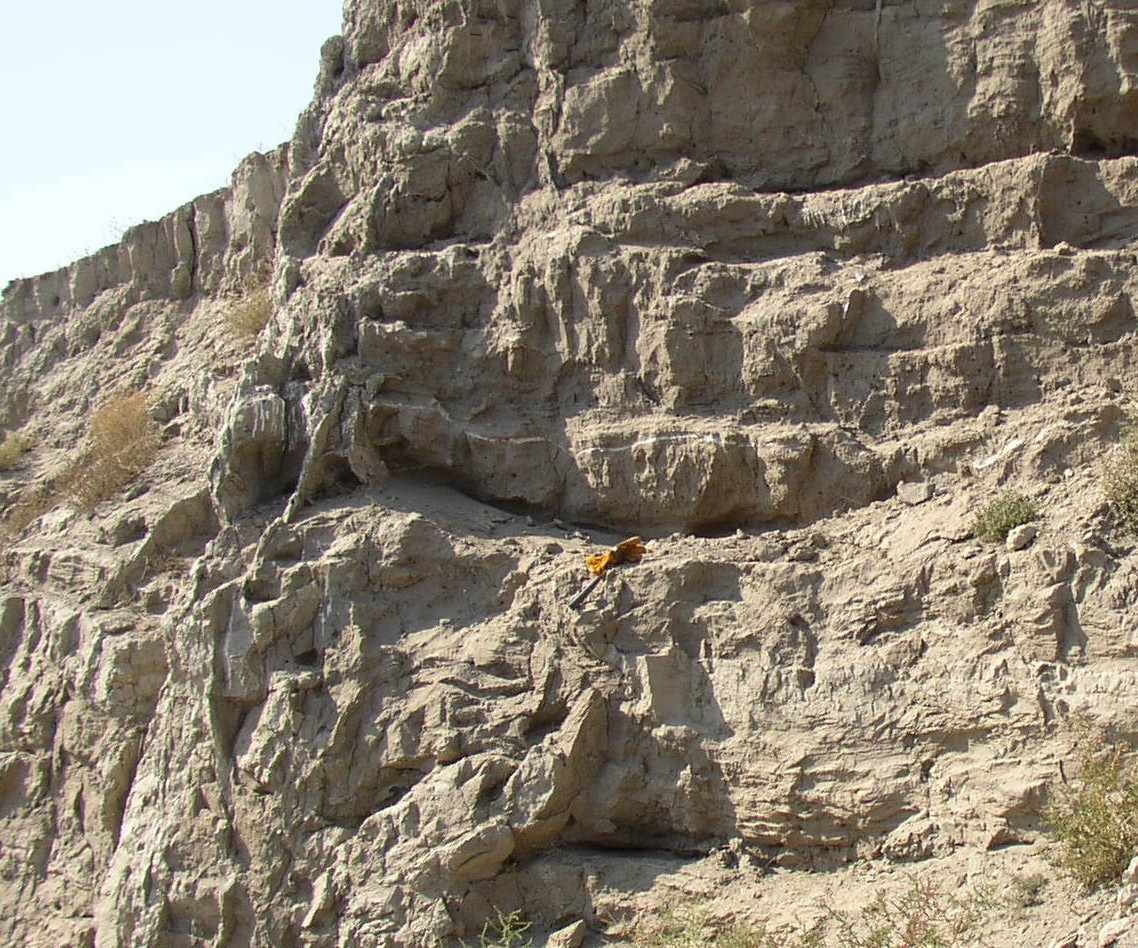
Touchet beds in the Touchet River valley.

Although visible along the Walla Walla and Touchet rivers, the Touchet Beds were not subjected to study until the early 20th century. They remain at the center of scientific analyses to characterize the Missoula Floods.

=== Type locality ===
The type locality for the Touchet Formation is the confluence of the Touchet River with the Walla Walla River, originally noted by Richard Foster Flint in 1938. Numerous other exposures were subsequently identified throughout the basins of the former Lake Lewis and Lake Condon. Touchet-equivalent slackwater deposits are also present in the Willamette Valley near Portland (former Lake Allison).

=== Early interpretation ===
In 1923, J Harlen Bretz published a paper arguing that the channeled scablands in Eastern Washington were caused by massive flooding in the distant past. This view, which was seen as arguing for a Catastrophic explanation for the geologic development, which ran counter the then prevailing view of uniformitarianism, and Bretz's views were initially decried. Bretz defended his theories, setting off a forty-year debate over the Missoula Floods before Bretz's view of a catastrophic flood finally prevailed. Waitt extended Bretz's argument, arguing for a sequence of multiple Missoula Floods — 40 or more. Waitt's proposal was based mainly on analysis from glacial lake bottom deposits in Ninemile Creek and the Touchet Formation deposits in Burlingame Canyon. This represented a move away from a single catastrophic flood toward a series of catastrophic floods, but with the flood source still ascribed to Glacial Lake Missoula.

The controversy whether the Channeled Scabland landforms were formed mainly by multiple periodic large floods or by a single grand-scale cataclysmic flood from either late Pleistocene Glacial Lake Missoula or an unidentified Canadian source reappeared in 1999. Shaw's team reviewed the sedimentary sequences of the Touchet beds and concluded that the sequences do not automatically imply multiple floods separated by decades or centuries. Rather, they proposed that sedimentation in the Glacial Lake Missoula basin was the result of jökulhlaups draining into Lake Missoula from British Columbia to the north. Shaw's team proposed that the rhythmic Touchet beds are the result of multiple pulses, or surges, within a single larger flood. In response, Atwater's team observed that there is substantial evidence for periods of nondeposition and subaerial exposure lasting decades in duration between flood events, including mud cracks and animal burrows in the lower Touchet beds which were filled by sediment from later floods. The Evidence for periods of nondeposition and subaerial exposure between the deposition of individual beds have been further documented and the occurrence of multiple Missoula Floods confirmed by later research.

== Causes ==
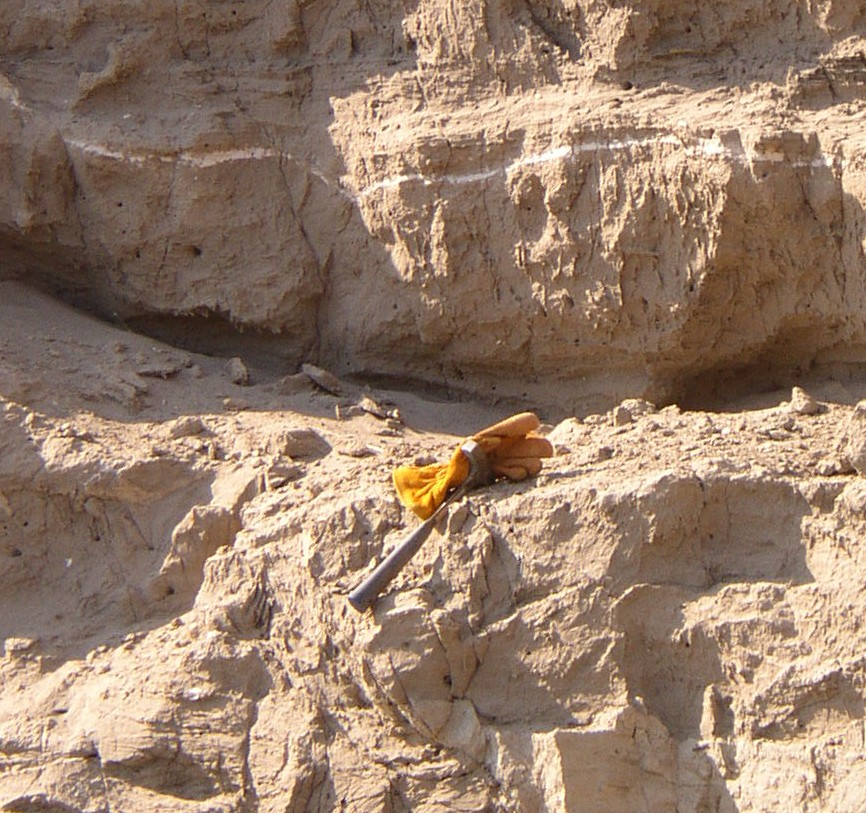
Touchet beds in the Touchet River valley. Note distinct white line, which consists of two layers of Mount St. Helens Set S ash that fell in eastern Washington about 16,000 calendar years ago.

Recent scientific investigations support Waitt's proposed separation of layers into records of sequential flood events. Although the various sources support temporal separation of floods, they do not definitively identify the source of water for all of the floods, though they all agree that Lake Missoula was source for at least some of them.

=== Lithology ===
The Touchet beds consists of coarse to fine sand and silt rhythmites which were deposited during multiple Missoula Floods, around 18,400 to 15,700 calendar years ago, and during the Bonneville Flood that occurred in approximately 18,000 calendar years ago Another potential source for periodic flooding, still somewhat controversial, is flood release by jökulhlaups from subglacial lakes in British Columbia, but no specific source for these jökulhlaups has yet been identified.

During the floods, flow through the narrow Wallula Gap was restricted such that water pooled in a temporary lake, Lake Lewis, which formed in the lowlands of the Columbia Plateau. Lake Lewis back-flooded up the Yakima, Walla Walla, Touchet and Tucannon River valleys. This flooding lasted for a period of 4–7 days. In the relatively calm arms of the lake, the slack waters were thick with suspended materials eroded from the scablands above. Some of the suspended materials settled out, creating thick Touchet Formation layers, or rhythmites, which are found throughout these valleys. The larger clasts settled out first, followed by the finer ones. This resulted in layers with graded bedding, or bedding in which the larger particles are at the bottom and the smaller ones are at the top.

=== Periodicity ===
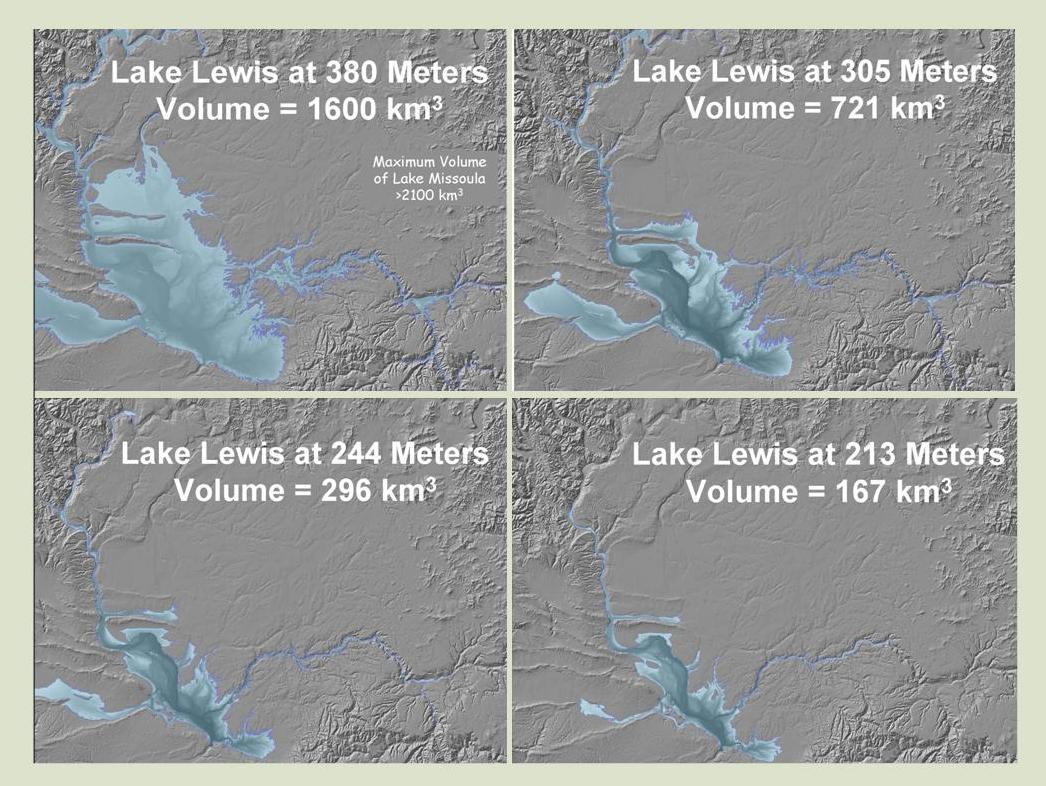
Lake Lewis was formed when the restricted flow of waters from periodic cataclysmic floods from Glacial Lake Missoula, pluvial Lake Bonneville, and perhaps from subglacial outbursts, backed up through the constriction formed by the Wallula Gap in the Horse Heaven Hills (southern Washington).

In 1980, R. B. Waitt studied the Touchet Formation in the wall of the Burlingame Canyon west of Walla Walla, Washington, where he counted at least 41 distinct flood deposit layers. He postulated that these floods could occur only when glacial Lake Missoula existed, which estimates place at 18,400 to 15,700 calendar years ago More recent studies have used radiocarbon dating to establish the approximate ages of deposition for the various layers.

The side valleys were protected from the violent currents of the main channel; as a result the flood strata laid down by earlier floods were not eroded away by subsequent floods, but were buried and preserved. The average period between flood episodes is estimated to be 20 to 60 years. The periodicity estimates are based on a number of constraints:

- The time to recharge Lake Missoula depends upon the level at which the dam is breached releasing the flood as well as upon the adjusted precipitation rate in the drainages flowing into Lake Missoula. For the volumes which correspond to calculated maximum flow rates, this is estimated to take from 20 to 80 years.
- Paleomagnetic orientations from beds of tephra (volcanic ash) that lie between the layers of the Touchet Formation show secular variation, which indicates that the beds must have been formed by many floods. The purity of the tephra suggests subaerial deposition (the tephra could be mixed with the surrounding sediment if it was deposited in moving water), which indicates a dry period during the ash falls (and hence a hiatus between floods).
- Offshore deposits on the bed of the Pacific at the mouth of the Columbia River include 120 m (390 ft) of material deposited over a several thousand-year period that corresponds to the period of multiple scabland floods seen in the Touchet Beds. Since there are at least 40 floods, this would give an average separation between floods of 50 years.
- The number of layers deposited varies with location in the Lake Lewis basin. This can best be understood as the result of multiple floods; the variable levels correspond to Lake Missoula breaching the ice dam at varying lake levels, releasing different volumes of flood waters. This would suggest the time between floods is variable.
- Flood beds in other locations upstream of Lake Lewis such as Ninemile Creek in Montana and the Sanpoil arm of glacial Lake Columbia show a corresponding regularity of flood deposits as well as deposit grading and rhythmical repetition to those in Lake Lewis. Since Glacial Lake Columbia remained filled, annual deposits (varves) can be observed between flood deposits. The flood deposits can be distinguished from annually deposited varves by both their thickness and the presence of materials foreign to the immediate drainage. Atwater reports from 35 to 55 annual varves between flood deposits in Lake Columbia, supporting a period of 35 to 55 years between ice dam failures.
- Additional varve counts from the Lake Missoula Basin, Sanpoil River, and Latah Creek suggest that the time between floods was 30–40 years on average.

== Locations ==
=== Touchet River valley ===
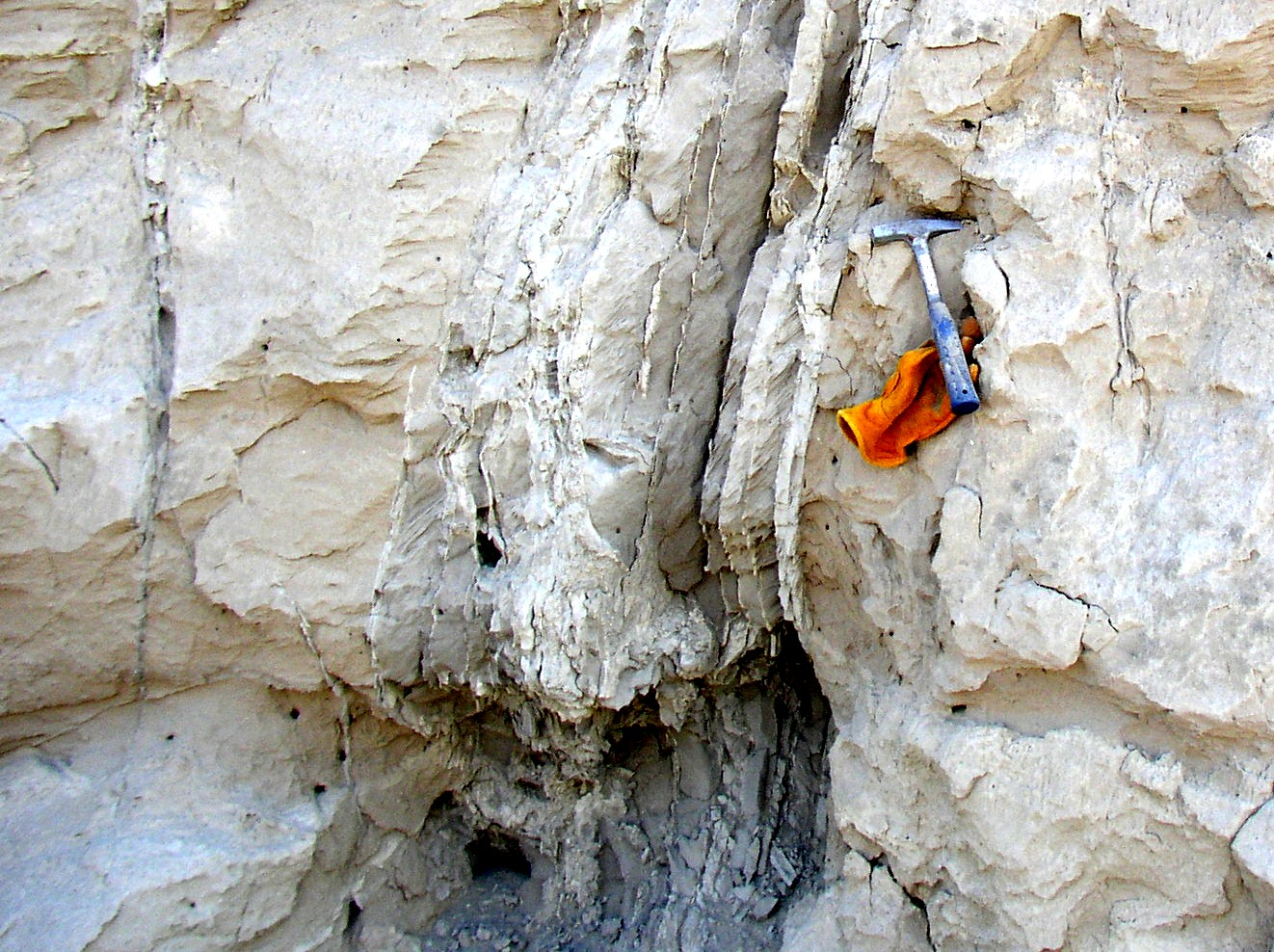
Carson and Pogue identified these as clastic dikes penetrating Touchet layers. Photo taken in a road cut several miles up the Touchet Valley.

The Touchet Formation was originally identified at the confluence of the Touchet River with the Walla Walla River. It is also found at some distance up the Touchet River Valley. The number of layers observed decreases as one progresses up-valley, indicating that the floodwater lakes varied in depth and distance upstream from the various flood dams. Clastic dike intrusions are observed in some locations penetrating the layers vertically; the dikes are infilled with uniform-size fine-grained materials and are indications that the period between floods was long enough that the deposits dried, forming vertical cracks and allowing wind-blown eroded materials to infill the cracks.

=== Walla Walla River valley ===
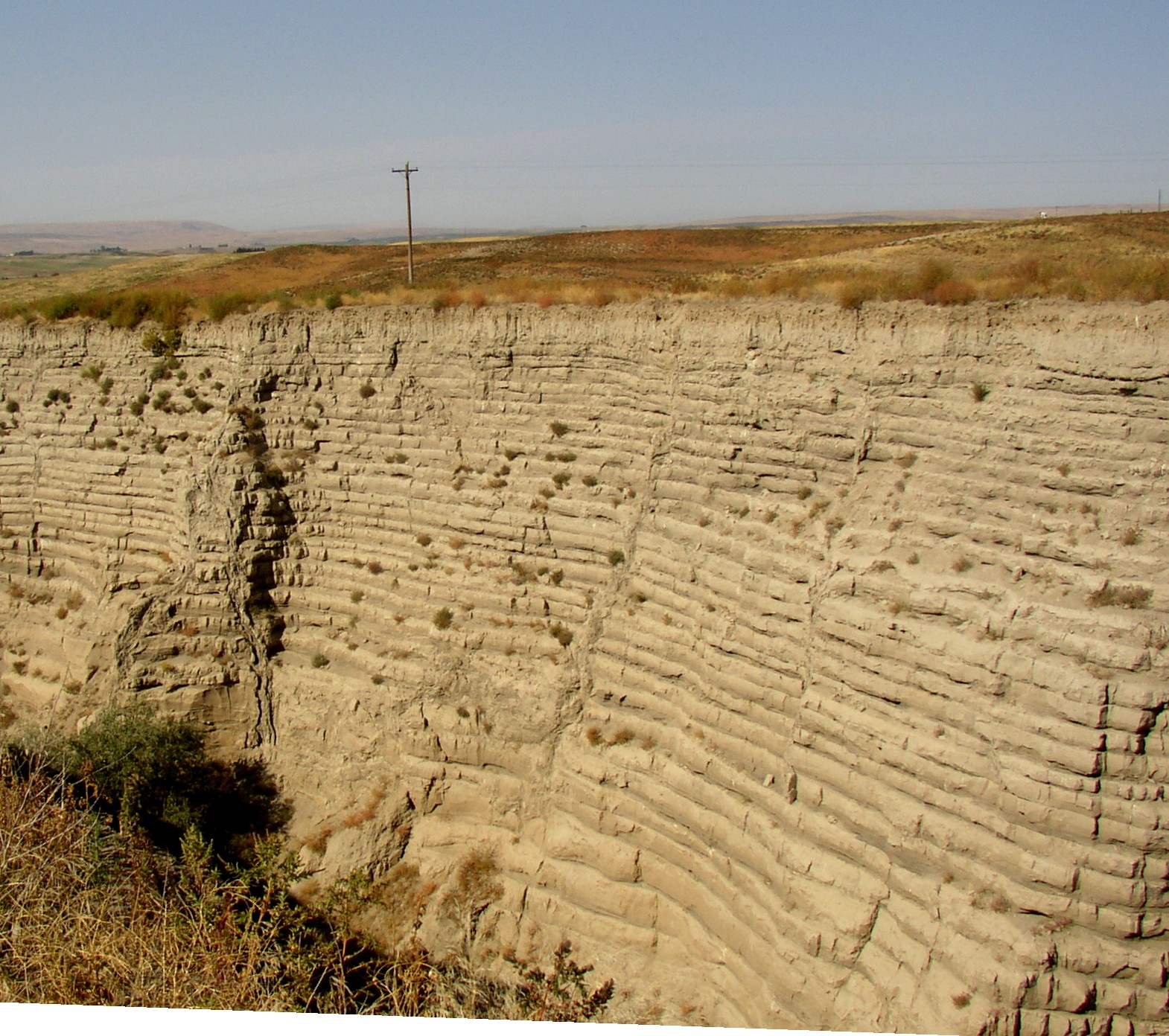
Touchet beds near Lowden in the Walla Walla valley. Note distinct layers.

The Walla Walla River Valley is a broad open basin drained by the Walla Walla River. Below the valley, the river flows through a narrow 8-mile (13 km) gap to its confluence with the Columbia River. This area was filled to varying depths by the successive Missoula Floods, and sediments settled out to form the Touchet beds over much of the basin, creating what is today a fertile farmland region. In the lowest part of the broader valley, to the east of the Columbia River and west of the city of Walla Walla, Washington, soils commonly form on Touchet beds. In several locations erosion has exposed these beds. One outcrop, the Gardena Terrace segment of the rhythmites, can be seen along the highway west of Walla Walla. The Touchet Formation is also extensively exposed at Burlingame Canyon, just southwest of the town of Touchet near the confluence of the Touchet and Walla Walla Rivers. The deposits are also found along tributaries to the Walla Walla, extending some distance south into Oregon.

=== Yakima River valley ===
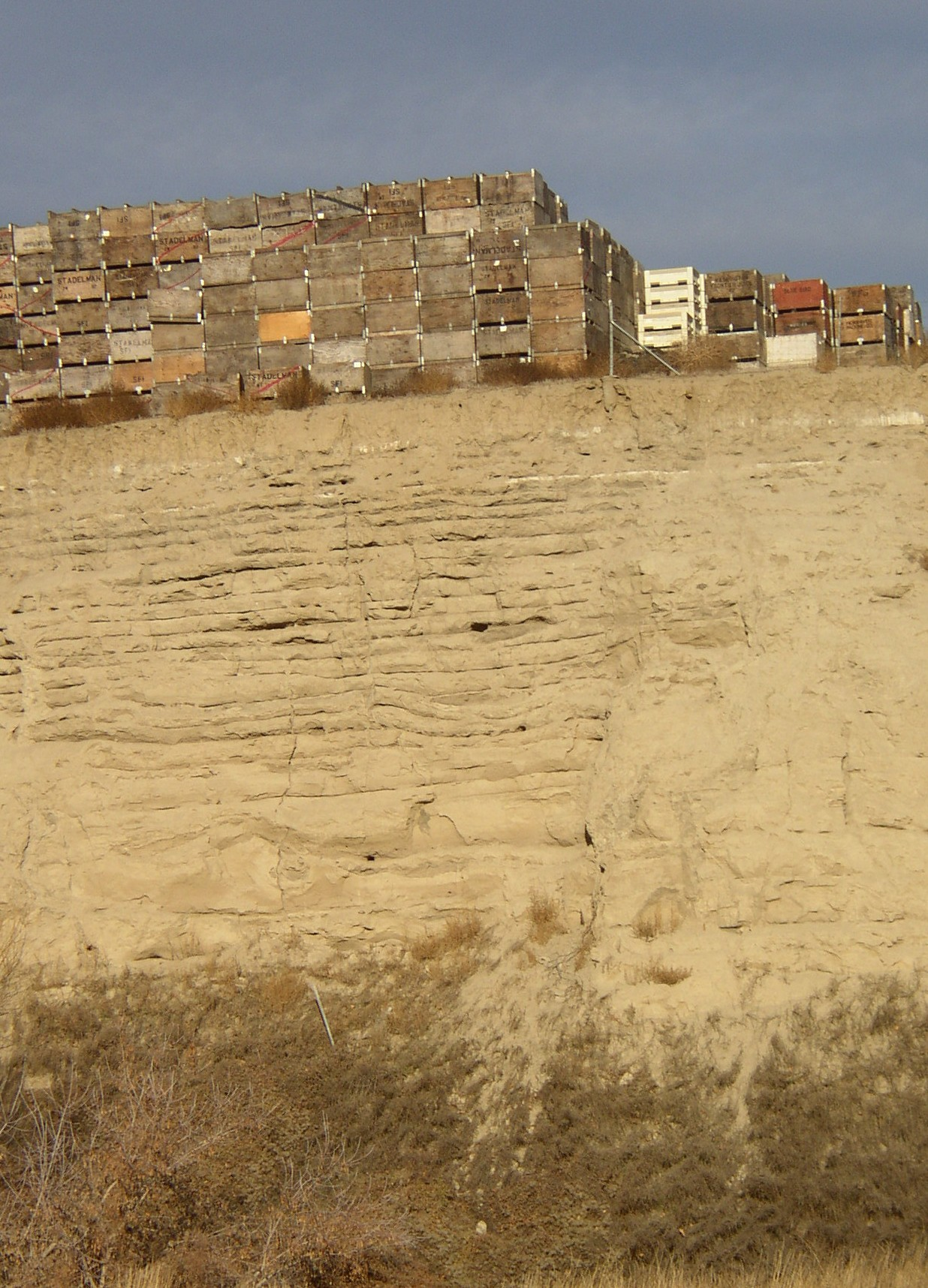
Touchet beds on the Yakima River in Zillah, Washington. Note distinct layers. Apple crates at top provide scale (each is 1 meter high) for layer thickness.

Lake Lewis extended up the Yakima Valley, flooding an area of about 600 sq mi (1,600 km^{2}) of the valley and covering the area now occupied by the city of Yakima by about 200 ft (61 m). The valley extends for 80 mi (130 km), widening westwards above the Chandler Narrows and then narrowing again at Union Gap just below Yakima. The Toppenish Basin and Benton Basin of the lower Yakima River both contain large amounts of Touchet Formation deposits. Rhythmites are extensively exposed 1 mi (1.6 km) north of Mabton and at Zillah. Ice rafted erratics are also commonly found in these beds.

=== Tucannon River valley ===
The Tucannon River and its tributary, the Pataha Creek also have valleys partially filled with alluvial deposits from the Missoula and Bonneville floods. Although they lie some distance up the Snake River drainage, the flood waters of Lake Lewis backed up this drainage far enough to deposit sediments. Floodplain deposits consist of up to six distinct Touchet Beds, as well as loess silt and fine sand. These alluvial and loess deposits narrow as they approach the basalt valley walls, and thicken into the central valley, with a maximum sediment thickness of between 20 and 100 ft (6 and 30 m). Due to the elevation of the valley, only six of the flooding events caused water to back into the Tucannon Valley in sufficient volume to deposit distinct layers.

=== Columbia River Basin ===
Rhythmites from the Missoula Floods have also been observed in the Columbia River valley. One notable location is the White Bluffs, which are made up of more thickly bedded deposits from the eddy that formed in the floodwaters behind the Saddle Mountains. Another location is at Trinidad, located approximately 8 miles (13 km) west of Quincy (Crescent Bar Road).

=== Willow Creek Valley ===
The Touchet Formation is also found in Oregon, in areas flooded by Lake Condon. This lake back-flooded into the Umatilla and John Day River Valleys as well as other tributaries. As one example, silt-sand rhythmites associated with the Missoula Floods are present along Willow Creek, a valley tributary to the Columbia River. Willow Creek joins with the Columbia a few miles west of Boardman, Oregon. Excellent exposures of the unit (which contains abundant clastic dikes) can be found in roadcuts along Hwy 74 (Heppner Highway) near the ranching community of Cecil, Oregon. These deposits are associated with former Lake Condon.
