= Jerry Lawrence =

Jerry Lawrence may refer to:

- Jerry Lawrence (politician) (born 1937), Canadian broadcaster and politician
- Jerry Lawrence (footballer) (born 2005), English footballer
- Jerry Lawrence Provincial Park, Canadian provincial park in Upper Tanatallon, Nova Scotia named after politician
