= Lewis Lake, Nova Scotia =

Lewis Lake, Nova Scotia could mean the following:

== Community ==
- Lewis Lake Unincorporated area in the Halifax Regional Municipality 44°41′11″N 63°50′59″W
- Lewis Lake Unincorporated area in the Halifax Regional Municipality 44°49′31″N 63°46′39″W

== Lakes ==
- Lewis Lake, a lake in Guysborough County at 45°17′45″N 61°59′13″W
- Lewis Lake, a lake in Hants County at 44°55′15″N 63°46′44″W
- Lewis Lake, a lake in the Municipality of the District of Chester at 44°47′21″N 64°23′21″W

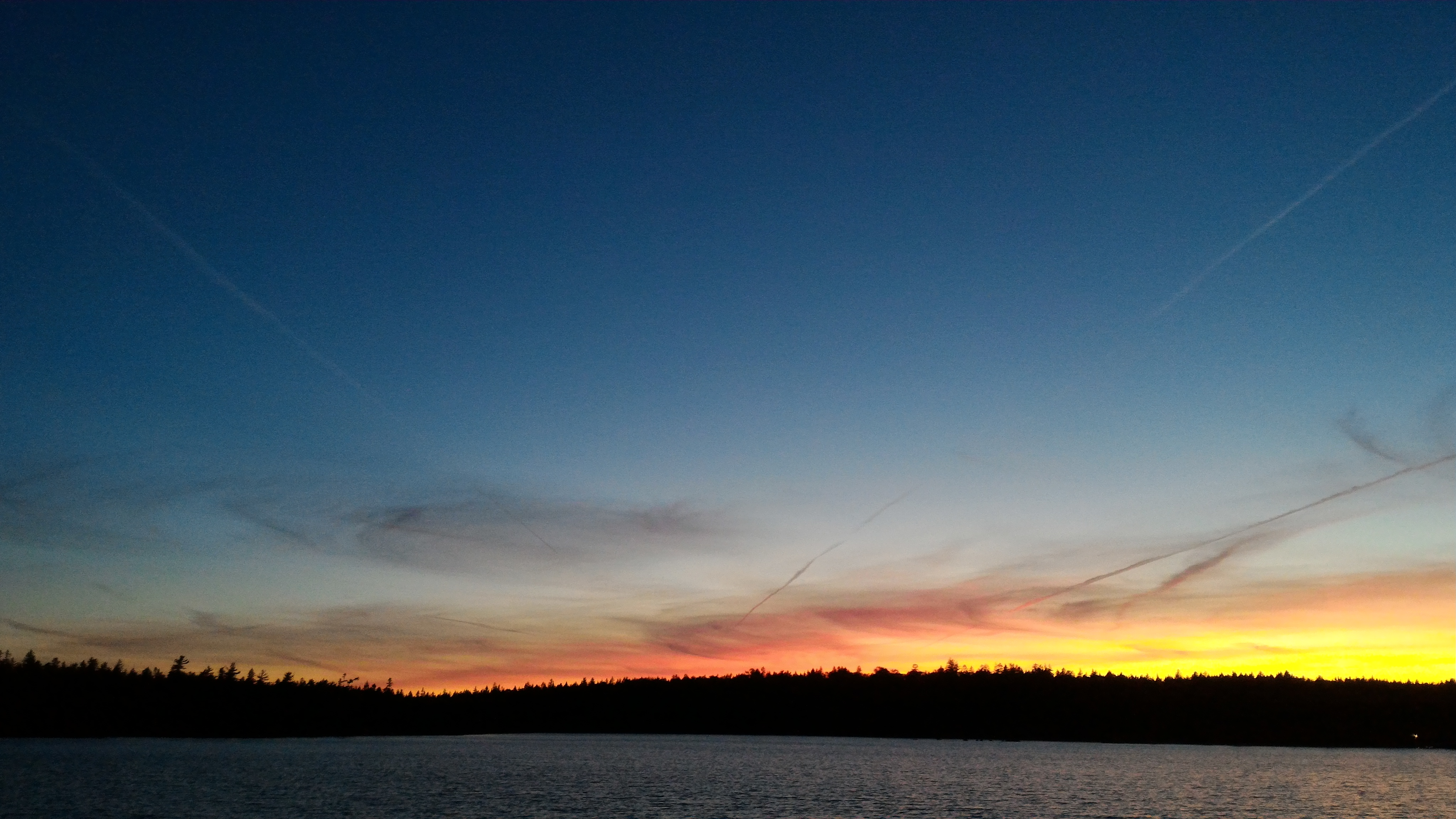
Sunset over Lewis Lake, Hammonds Plains

In the Halifax Regional Municipality there are 5 lakes named Lewis Lake:

- Lewis Lake near Moose River Gold Mines 44°59′49″N 63°0′30″W
- Lewis Lake near Lake Echo 44°45′1″N 63°22′57″W
- Lewis Lake in Upper Hammonds Plains 44°42′11″N 63°44′7″W
- Lewis Lake in Hubley 44°41′12″N 63°50′34″W
- Lewis Lake at Upper Sackville 44°49′32″N 63°46′27″W

== Park ==
- Lewis Lake Provincial Park 44°41′21″N 63°50′46″W

== See also ==
- Lewis Lake (disambiguation)
