= Lake Condon =

- Lake Condon's historical location in Oregon, USA
- Location: North America
- Coordinates: 45.919167°N 119.355556°W
- Lake type: former lake
- Primary inflows: Wallula Gap of the Columbia River
- Primary outflows: Columbia River Gorge
- Basin countries: United States
- Max. length: 110 mi (180 km)
- Max. width: 57 mi (92 km)
- Average depth: 600 ft (183 m)
- Max. depth: 1,000 ft (305 m)
- Water volume: 116 cu mi (480 km^{3})
- Residence time: 2.6 years
- Surface elevation: 1,000 ft (305 m)

Lake Condon was a temporary lake in the Pacific Northwest region of North America, formed periodically by the Missoula Floods from 15,000 to 13,000 BC. It was named after Oregon geologist Thomas Condon.

The restricted flow of waters from cataclysmic floods from Glacial Lake Missoula, and pluvial Lake Bonneville through the constriction of the Wallula Gap in the Horse Heaven Hills flowed into south-central Washington and north-central Oregon, and were backed up by the Columbia River Gorge, forming Lake Condon. The water remained for a period of 5–7 days before the flood waters drained through the Columbia River Gorge. Lake Condon reached an elevation of about 1200 feet above sea level (today's sea level) before subsiding.

Lake Condon also flooded the Umatilla and John Day river valleys.

== Glacial Lake Missoula ==
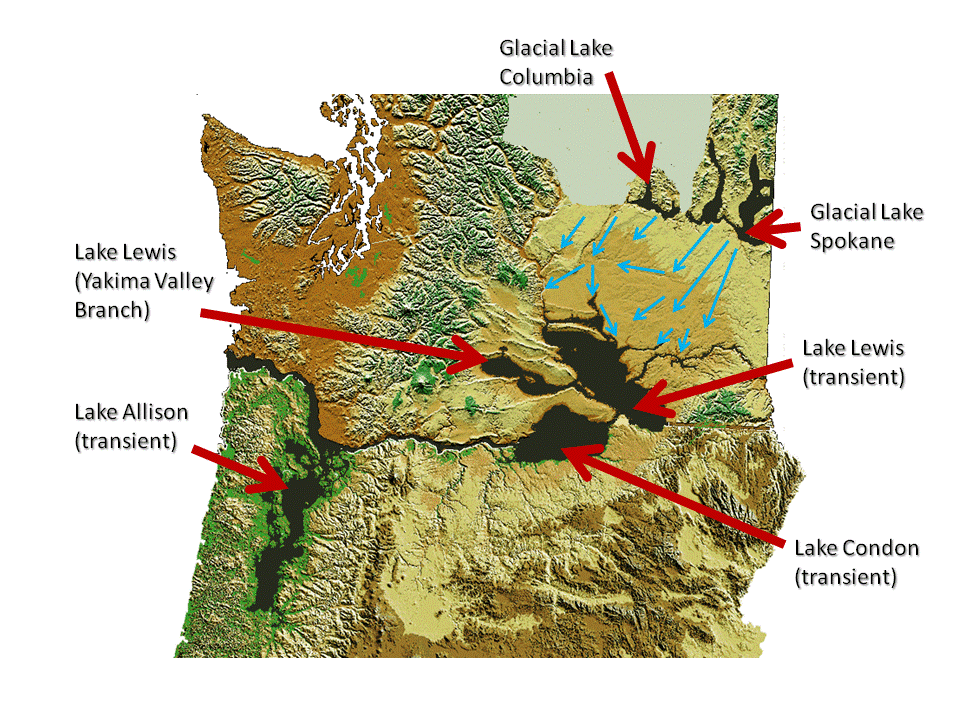
Location of the former Lake Condon.

During the last Ice Age (18,000 to 12,000 years ago), and in multiple previous Ice Ages, cataclysmic floods inundated portions of the Pacific Northwest from Glacial Lake Missoula, pluvial Lake Bonneville, and perhaps from subglacial outbursts. Glacial Lake Missoula was a body of water as large as some of the USA's Great Lakes. This lake formed from glacial meltwater that was dammed by a lobe of the Canadian ice sheet. Episodically, perhaps every 40 to 140 years, the waters of this huge lake forced its way past the ice dam, inundating parts of the Pacific Northwest. Eventually, the ice receded northward far enough that the dam did not reform, and the flooding episodes ceased.

== Evidence for Lake Condon ==
=== Columbia River Gorge ===
Although the river slowly eroded the land over this period of time, the most drastic changes took place at the end of the last ice age when the Missoula Floods cut the steep, dramatic walls that exist today. The gorge provided a hydraulic dam which backed waters up for days before it drained. This quick erosion left many layers of volcanic rock exposed.

=== Touchet-like formation ===
Lake Condon backflooded into the Umatilla and John Day River Valleys. In these relatively calm arms of the lake, the slackwaters were thick with suspended materials eroded from the scablands above. Some of the suspended materials settled out, creating thick sediment layers which are found throughout these valleys. These sediment layers are part of the Touchet Formation.

=== Glacial erratics ===
The maximum elevation of the flood, as established by other indications, is confirmed by glacial erratics, which were stranded on the slopes up the John Day and Umatilla river valleys and other elevated regions in the mid-Columbia at elevations of up to 1200 feet (366m) above sea level.
