= Horse Heaven Hills =

Range of hills in Washington, U.S.

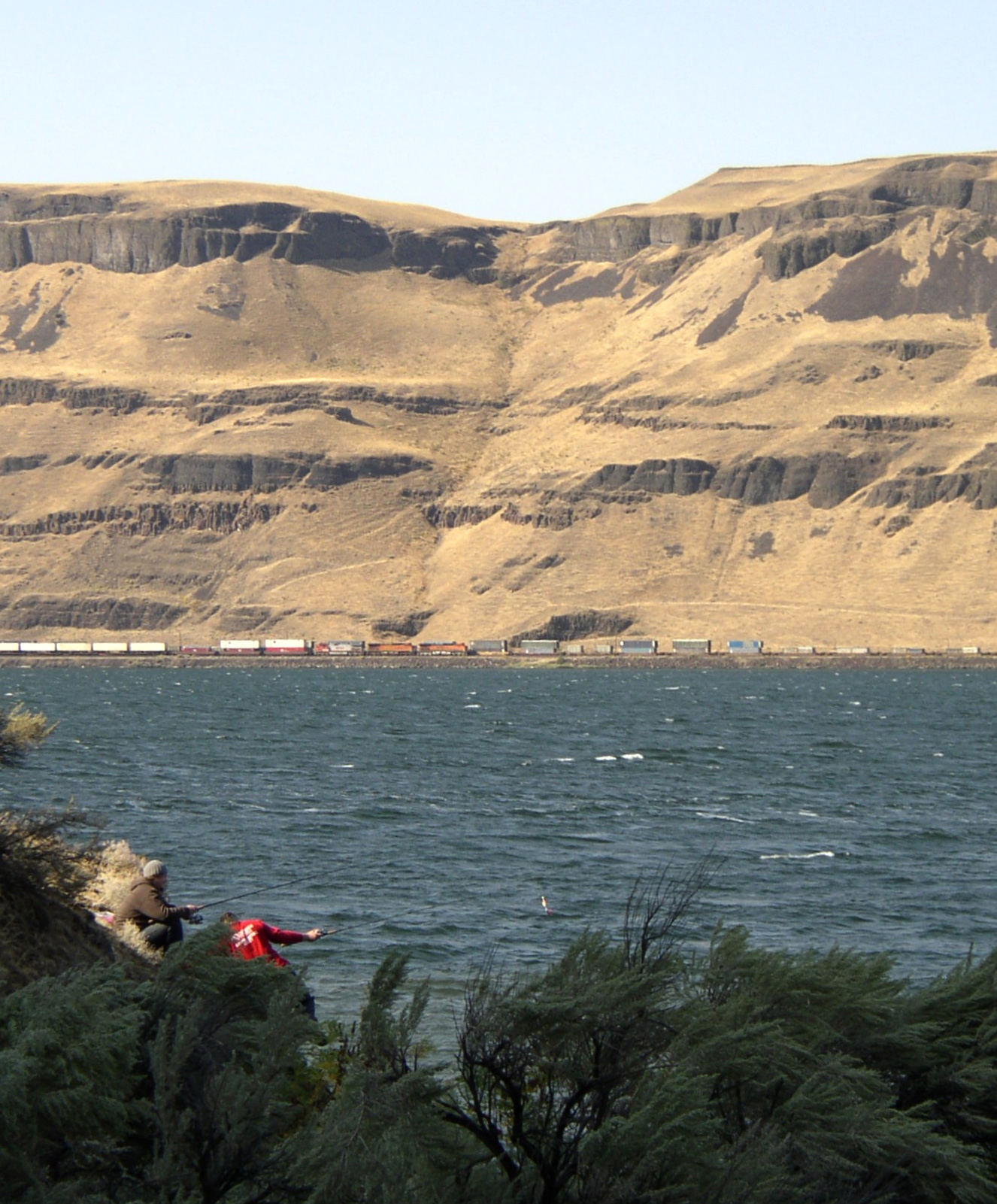
- The Horse Heaven Hills along the Columbia River at Wallula Gap; note the dark areas of extensive flood basalts exposed by erosion.

Highest point
- Peak: Bickleton Ridge
- Elevation: 4,327 ft (1,319 m)

Geography
- Location within Washington (state)
- Country: United States
- State: Washington
- Range coordinates: 46°08′N 119°52.05′W

The Horse Heaven Hills are a long range of high, rolling hills in Klickitat, Yakima, and Benton counties in Washington. The hills are an anticline ridge in the Yakima Fold Belt formed by north–south compression of lava flows in the Columbia River Basalt Group. The highest point is Bickleton Ridge in the western end of the hills. They lie within the rain shadow to the east of the Cascade Range, making them significantly drier and hotter than regions west of the Cascades.

The region has been inhabited by Native Americans for centuries, who had settlements surrounding the Horse Heaven Hills. They used the range both as hunting grounds and as a geographic boundary between different tribes. The Lewis and Clark Expedition represents the first known Europeans to reach the area. European settlement followed, with the introduction of modern farming techniques. In recent years, wineries have become an important economic driver in the region, and the Horse Heaven Hills AVA was established in 2005.

North-to-south compression of flood basalts that erupted several million years ago is responsible for the uplift that created the hills. They were further shaped by massive floods that occurred toward the end of the last ice age. The floods carried icebergs that brought glacial erratics, which stand out from the basalt that dominates the Columbia Basin.

Native grasses and shrubs dominate the range, which is mostly treeless. Flora also includes native flowers, some of which are listed as being threatened. There were at one time large numbers of big game roaming the hills, but many of them were hunted to extinction. Horses briefly roamed widely through the hills, but they were largely removed to facilitate farming. Today, wild horses are confined to near Satus Pass. There have been recent efforts to reintroduce animals that had previously been driven from the range.

== Geography ==
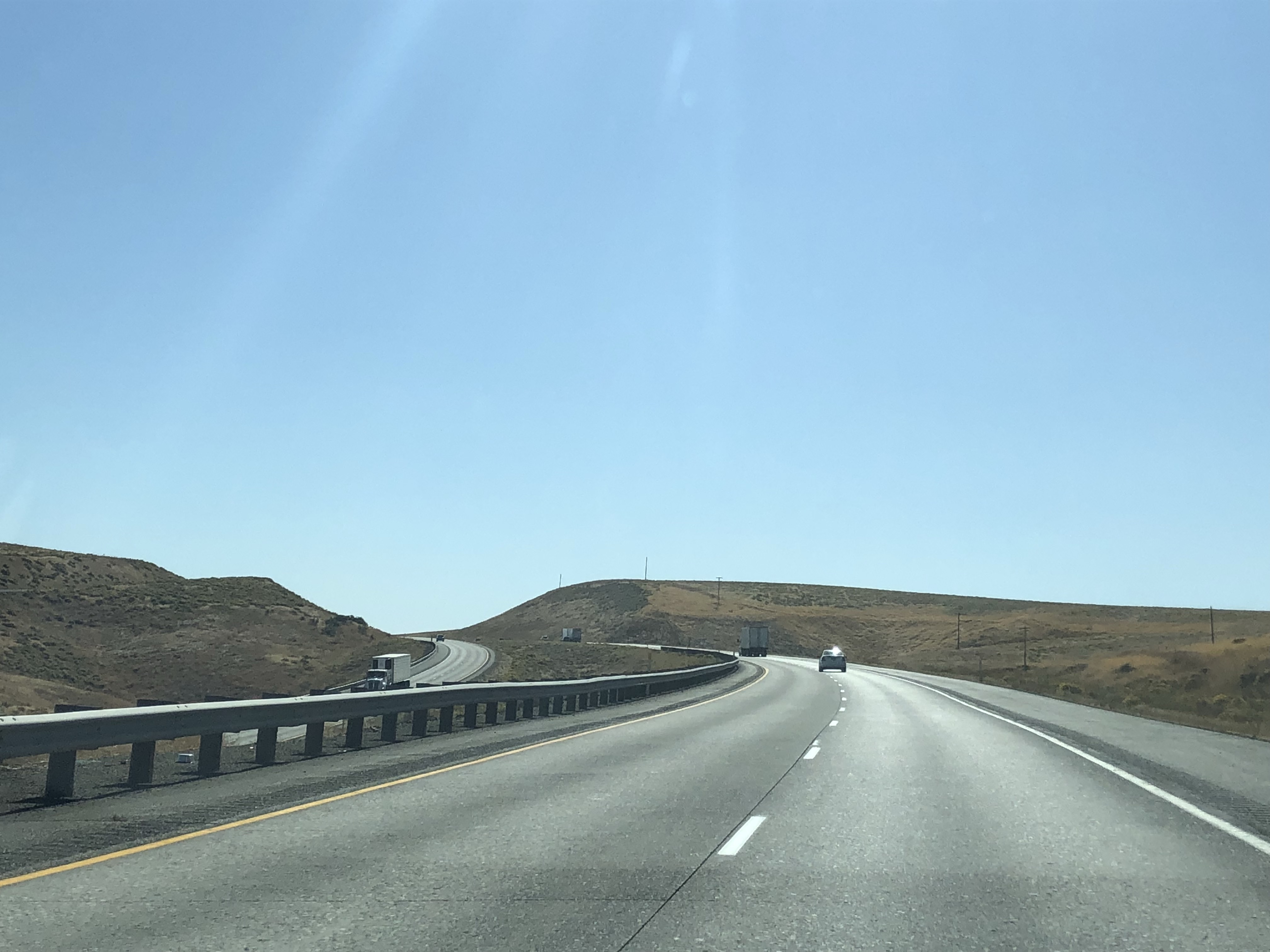
Looking eastbound on I-82 as it approaches the crest of the Horse Heaven Hills.

The Horse Heaven Hills lead eastward from the Simcoe Mountains to Wallula Gap. The range is bounded in the west by Satus Creek near Bickleton, the Columbia River in the east and south, and the anticline ridge that roughly follows the Yakima River in the north. The Simcoe Mountains lead westward from the Horse Heaven Hills to the Cascade Range.

The north slope of the hills is especially steep, with the south slope being relatively gentle by comparison. This hills form the south end of the Yakima River Valley. The highest point is Bickleton Ridge which reaches 4,327 feet (1,319 m) high near the town of Bickleton at the southwest end of the range.

The area is sparsely populated, with only a handful of unincorporated communities such as Bickleton and Horse Heaven. Adjacent to the north side of the hills are much larger communities, such as the Tri-Cities and Prosser.

There are numerous county roads that traverse the range. It is crossed by Interstate 82 (cosigned with US 395), which connects Kennewick to Plymouth, and State Route 221, connecting Prosser to Paterson. State Route 397 travels through the foothills of the range to connect I-82 to Finley, passing to the north side of Jump Off Joe. State Route 14 crossed the Horse Heaven Hills before I-82 was built, but that designation was truncated to Plymouth when the interstate was built along the same route as the highway.

Several intermittent streams rise in the Horse Heaven Hills, including Amon Creek. The north slopes of the range drain to the Yakima River, a tributary of the Columbia. The rest of the range drains directly into the Columbia River itself.

=== Climate ===
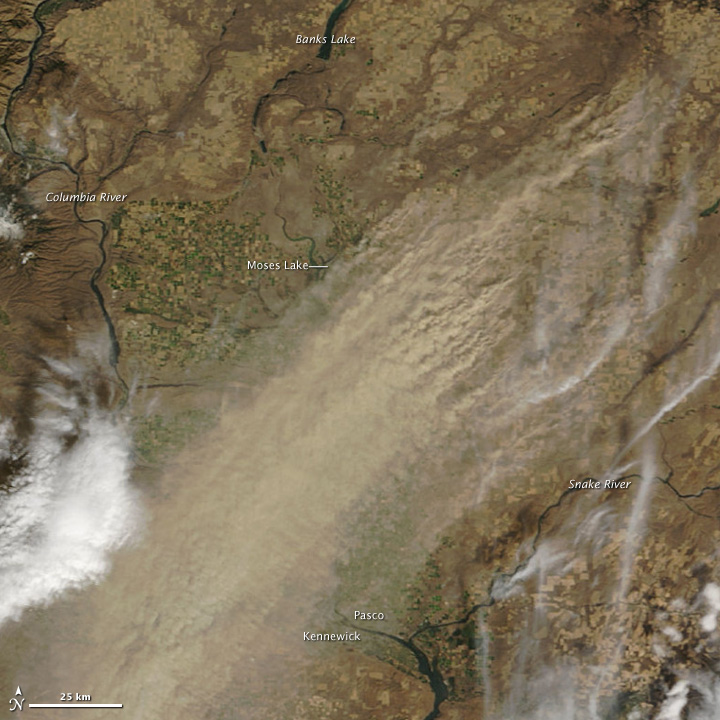
A dust storm over the Horse Heaven Hills and Columbia Basin.

The Horse Heaven Hills are located in one of the hottest parts of Washington, sharing in the same semi-arid climate that is experienced in nearby cities such as the Tri-Cities and Hermiston. Throughout the range, the Köppen climate classification includes warm-summer Mediterranean in the west, cold semi-arid in the east, with some smaller areas of hot-summer Mediterranean.

Rainfall values are low, ranging from 9 inches (230 mm) in lower portions of the range to near 20 inches (510 mm) annually in higher elevations to the west. This is because the hills lie east of the Cascades. The Cascade Mountains cause a rain shadow that makes nearly the entirety of eastern Washington and Oregon semi-arid, and much drier than areas to the west of the Cascade Crest. Most precipitation falls during the winter, with the dry season occurring during the summer. Despite the low average rainfall, summer thunderstorms can stall over the hills causing flash flooding. Flooding was most severe in Kennewick before construction of the Zintel Canyon Dam in 1992.

The area is among the driest wheat growing regions in the world. Strong winds cause extensive soil erosion on farmland, with blowing dust exceeding federal air quality standards twenty times over a ten-year period. These events can reduce visibility to near zero and force the closure of highways in the hills. In the winter, the Horse Heaven Hills are subject to more snow than the surrounding valleys. This can lead to erosion issues when large amounts of snow melt.

The Horse Heaven Hills may serve as a boundary that creates air pollution problems in the Tri-Cities. On hot, calm days during the summer, it is believed that air moves slowly from the north across the Tri-Cities, ponding at the base of the range. It is believed that this is one of the things pushing ozone levels in the area to levels that are comparable to Seattle and near the federal limit. High ozone levels are also being noted in Hermiston, though these do not reach the level being seen in the Tri-Cities.

== History ==
The Horse Heaven Hills and surrounding areas have been inhabited since long before European colonization, though human populations within the hills themselves has remained quite low compared to the neighboring valleys. The range served as an important boundary between the ranges of different Native American peoples.

The first contact these people had with Europeans was during the Lewis and Clark Expedition. In the two centuries following the exploration missions, the human use of the Horse Heaven Hills transitioned from mostly hunting and grazing toward the modern agriculture we see in the region today, with larger cities growing on the periphery.

=== Prehistory and exploration ===
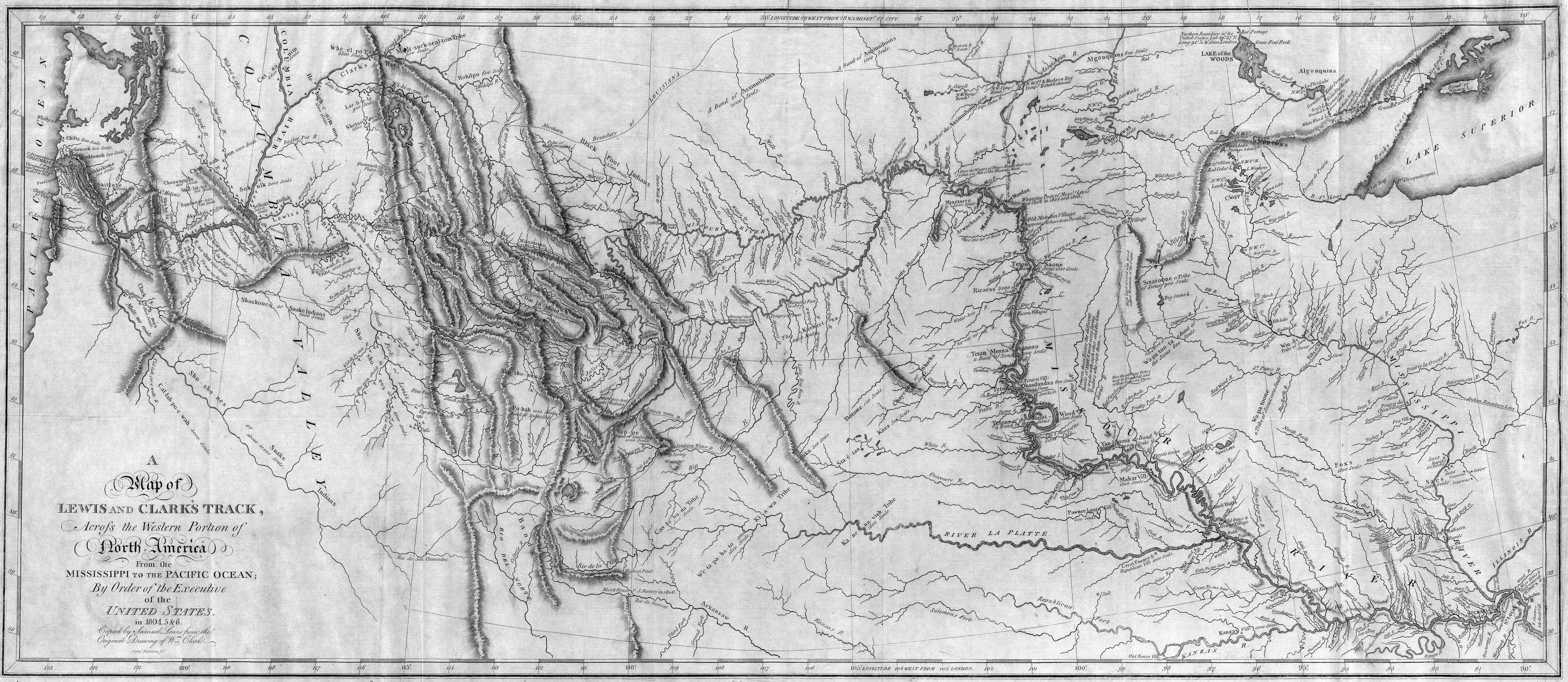
A map from the Lewis and Clark Expedition showing the Horse Heaven Hills near the confluence of the Columbia and Snake Rivers.

Before Europeans came to inhabit and farm in the Horse Heaven Hills, the area had been occupied by Native Americans for centuries. The hills lied within the territory of the Umatilla tribe and served as the southern boundary of the territory of the Yakama tribe. The Walla Walla tribe occupied the far northeastern portion of the hills in the general vicinity of Finley and Jump Off Joe. All of these tribes spoke the Sahaptin language and were hunter-gatherer societies. These peoples were removed from their ancestral homeland by the Walla Walla Council in 1855. The Walla Walla and Umatilla peoples now live in the Umatilla Indian Reservation near Pendleton, Oregon, and the Yakamas now live on the Yakama Indian Reservation south of Yakima, Washington.

The Lewis and Clark Expedition came down the Snake River to the present day site of Sacajawea State Park near Pasco in the fall of 1805. The Horse Heaven Hills are noted in their journal entry on October 16 as "a range of high Countrey which runs from S. W & N E and is on the opposite Side about 2 miles distant from the Columbia". In the following days, the expedition continued down the Columbia River as it goes around the Horse Heaven Hills through Wallula Gap.

=== Settlement ===
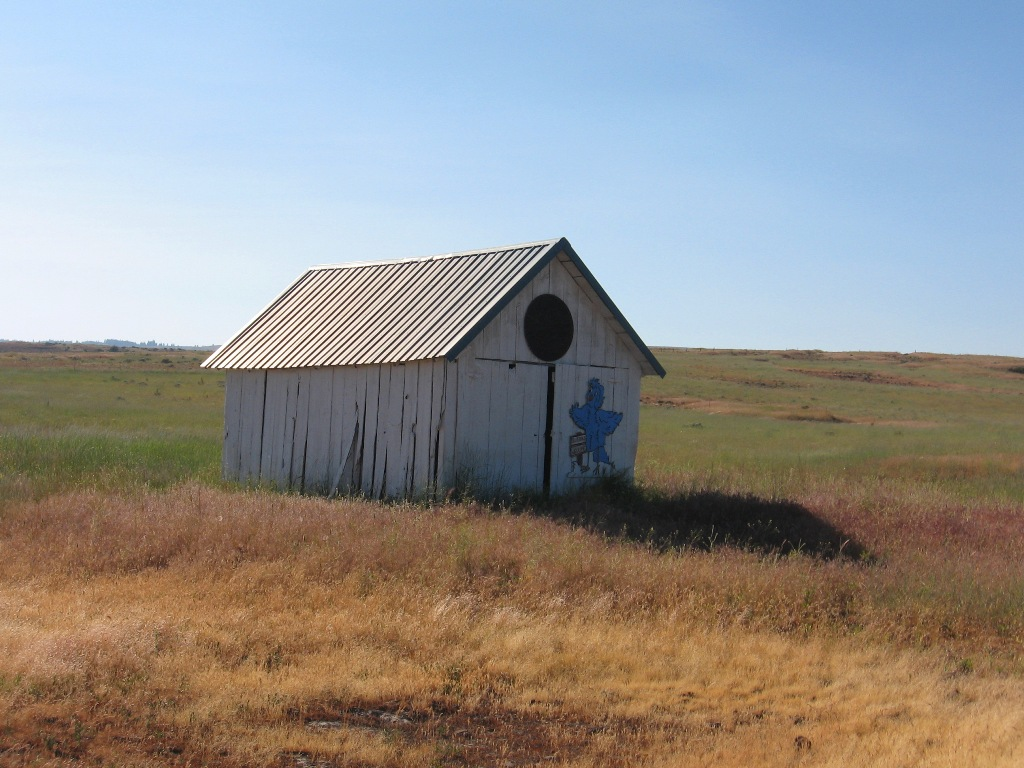
A shed near Bickleton

The first wagon trains entered the nearby Yakima Valley in 1853. The local natives were friendly to the settlers, but relations between the two groups of settlers and the entirety of eastern Washington (including the Horse Heaven Hills) was closed to white settlement. The ban was lifted after a series of uprisings and battles. Early homestead parcels in the hills were 160 acres (65 ha), with all of the homestead parcels having been claimed by 1910.

James Gordon Kinney, an early pioneer, is credited with officially naming the Horse Heaven Hills in 1881. He first came to the region in 1857. Impressed by the knee-high grass that fed the large bands of feral horses that roamed, he remarked "the area offers excellent forage and comparative isolation... This is surely a horse heaven!"

Farmers began growing dryland wheat in the hills above Prosser after a flour mill was built there in 1887. A couple of small towns were established in the late-19th Century and early-20th Century, such as Bickleton and Horse Heaven. Bickleton was first established as a trading post, with the rest of the town developing around it. Horse Heaven had a post office for about 30 years, while Bickleton's continues to operate today.

== Geology ==
Several million years ago, lava erupted from fissures in Oregon and Idaho creating what is known today as the Columbia River Basalt Group. There were over 300 individual flows with an average volume of 500–600 cubic kilometres (120–140 mi^{3}). This series of eruptions were unrelated to the volcanism occurring in the nearby Cascade Range. The flows gained an eventual thickness of around 1.8 kilometres (5,900 ft). The weight of the newly erupted basalt caused the underlying crust to subside. North-to-south compression of the basalt group caused the Horse Heaven Hills to begin slowly uplifting around 15 million years ago. The compression has a rate of approximately 1 millimetre (0.039 in) per year.

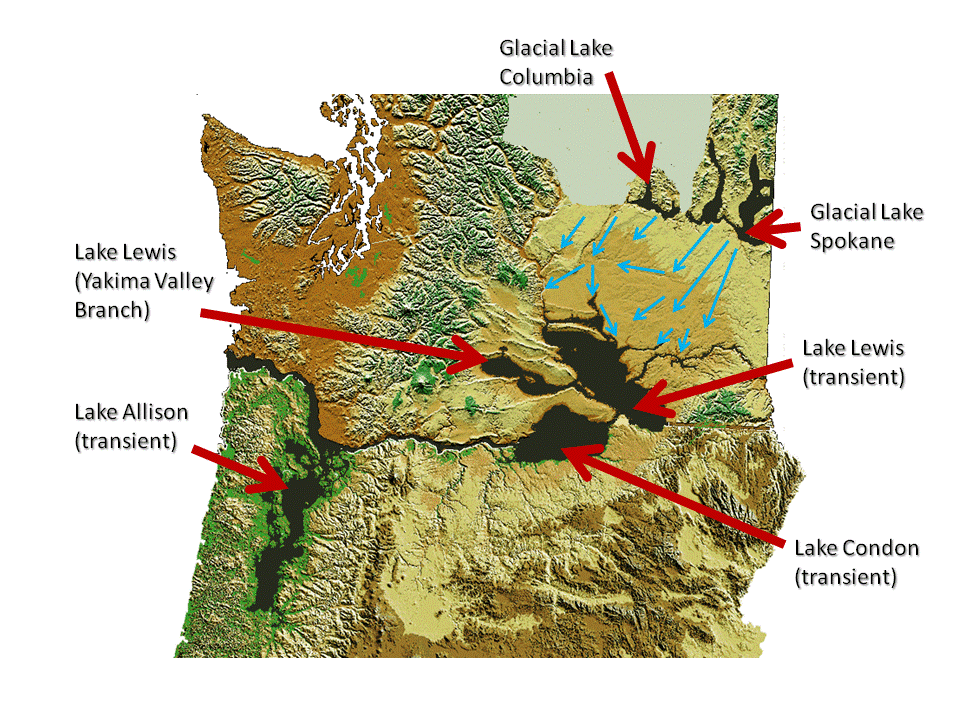
Location of the former Lake Lewis.

Toward the end of the Last Glacial Maximum, a lobe of the Cordilleran Ice Sheet dammed the Clark Fork near Missoula, Montana forming a large lake termed Glacial Lake Missoula. From 15,000 to 13,000 years ago the dam broke under the pressure of the lake, sending all of that water downstream toward the Pacific Ocean approximately every 55 years. The discharge of this massive flood was approximately 10 cubic kilometres (2.4 mi^{3}) per hour, which is 13 times the flow of the Amazon River.

The Horse Heaven Hills served as a dam for the water as it headed down the Columbia Basin, creating Lake Lewis. The surface of Lake Lewis reached a peak of around 1,200 feet (370 m) above today's sea level before all of the water flowed through Wallula Gap, which constrained the flow so that only about a fifth of the water could pass through in a day. The lake extended as far as Yakima and Moses Lake. The flood deposited glacial erratics on the lower slopes of the hills. These erratics are granite, which were pushed by the ice sheet from Alberta and then were deposited by the flood downstream when the icebergs that they were embedded in became stuck on the slopes of the Horse Heaven Hills and nearby ridges and later melted. After passing through Wallula Gap, the water was blocked at the entrance of the Columbia River Gorge forming Lake Condon on the south side of the Horse Heaven Hills.

The soils found in the Horse Heaven Hills were influenced by the Missoula floods, as well as comprising wind-blown loess and ash from volcanic eruptions from Cascade Volcanoes to the west considered to be part of the Palouse formation. The soils are nutrient-poor and free draining. There are small, deep canyons in the slopes of the range and other areas where the Columbia River Basalt Group is exposed. The north slope has numerous mass wasting scars. The loess contain erupted material from Mount Mazama (Crater Lake), Glacier Peak, and Mount St. Helens.

The 1936 State Line earthquake near Milton-Freewater, Oregon was located on the same fault as the Horse Heaven Hills. Despite being on the same fault line, the name Horse Heaven Hills is not applied to the hills created by the fault to the east of Wallula Gap.

== Human use ==
While sparsely populated, the Horse Heaven Hills have become an important region for agriculture and power generation within the state of Washington. Irrigation has turned portions of the range, which have a semi-arid climate, into a region that can grow a wide variety of crops. Most of the irrigated land is on the southern slope of the Horse Heaven Hills.

Thousands of acres within the Horse Heaven Hills are owned by government agencies. Most of the public land is controlled by the Washington State Department of Natural Resources. The Bureau of Land Management has significant holdings south of Benton City, and various local governments hold small amounts of land throughout the range.

In 2018, Bill Gates' asset manager Cascade Investments purchased 14,500 acres of farmland in the Horse Heaven Hills for $171 million. The land is occupied by 100 Circle Farms, which produces potatoes for McDonald’s french fries.

=== Agriculture ===
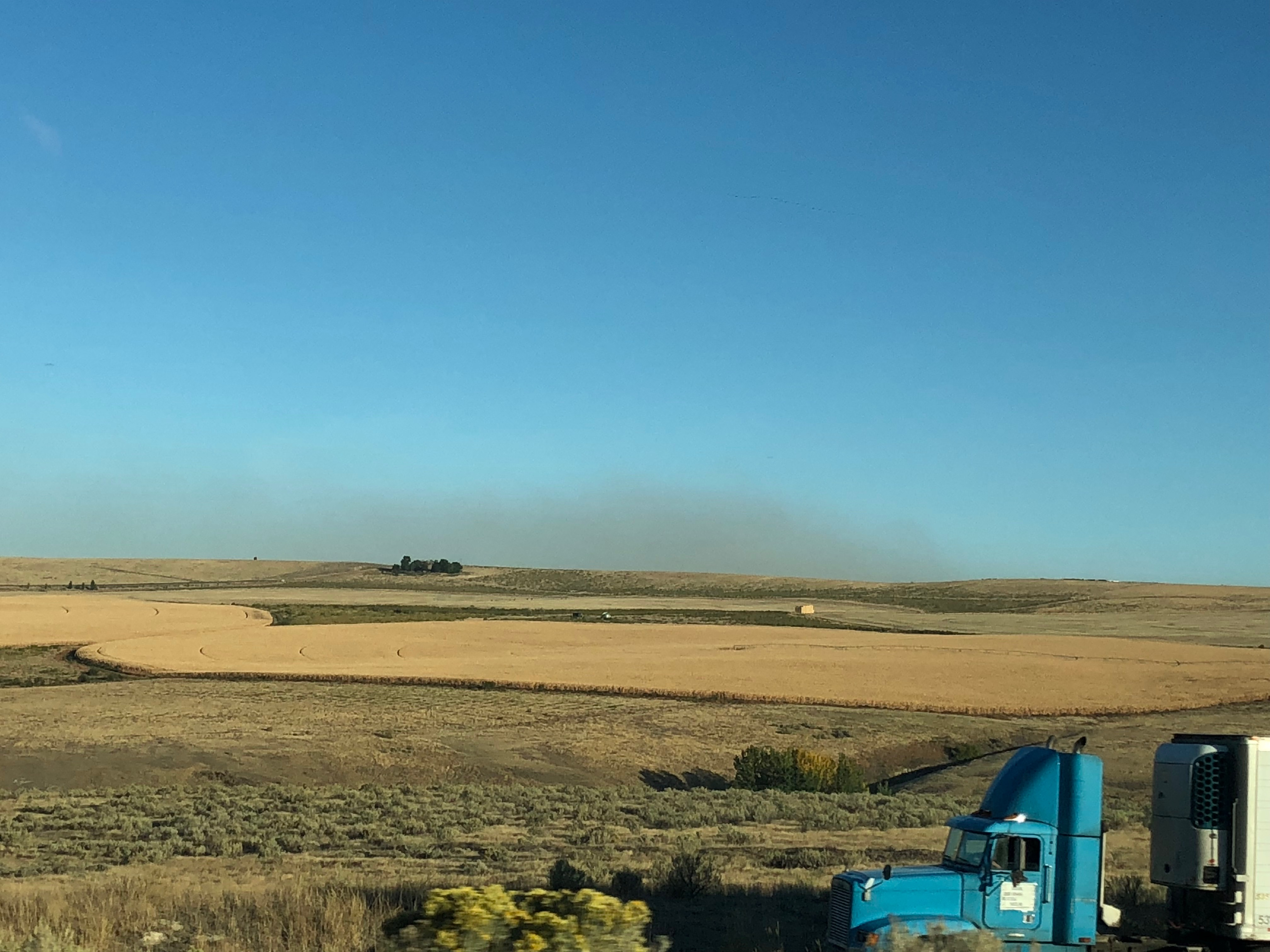
Farmland in the Horse Heaven Hills.

Irrigation from the Yakima and Columbia Rivers has recently made parts of the Horse Heaven Hills into an important agricultural region. Where there is no irrigation, dryland wheat is grown. The irrigation network continues to be expanded. An example of this is a project in 2016 that allowed for 4,000 acres (1,600 ha) more land to be irrigated. Projects like this have been opposed by wheat growers that lease the land they grow on, because they lose out to farmers who grow other crops.

Where irrigation water is accessible, a variety of crops can be grown. Some of these include potatoes, onions, and carrots in the ground. This also provides opportunities for orchards and wineries.

There are numerous wineries in the range, some of which grow a number of Washington's cult wines. The Horse Heaven Hills AVA, an American Viticultural Area, was established in 2005 for the benefit of the wineries in the region. Chateau Ste. Michelle operates the single largest wine making facility in the state of Washington in the town of Paterson.

=== Energy ===
Much of the range has favorable wind conditions for power generation. As such, the Horse Heaven Hills are the site of several wind farms generating electricity for the region. The Nine Mile Canyon Project located to the south of Kennewick and Finley covers 75 acres (30 ha) and is capable of producing 95.9 megawatts. This project was built in three phases between 2002 and 2007. It is tied into the Bonneville Power Administration transmission system.

The Juniper Canyon Wind Project near Bickleton started construction in 2010 in two phases. The first phase is capable of producing 150 megawatts, with the second portion adding 100 megawatts. It is also tied into the Bonneville Power Administration system through a newly built 20.4 miles (32.8 km) transmission line.

== Ecology ==
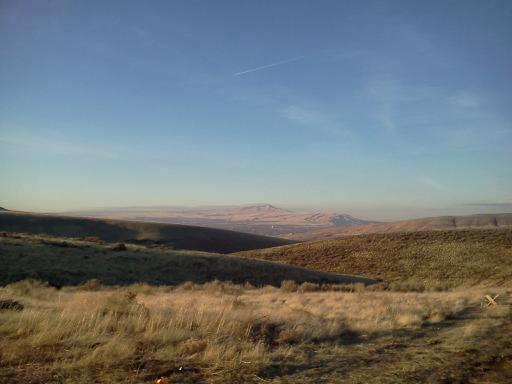
Native grasses in the Horse Heaven Hills south of Benton City.

The Horse Heaven Hills are dominated by grasses, shrubs, and small flowering plants. Sagebrush is native to the region and common. Some of the flowers found in the area are listed at varying levels of endangerment, including the cushion daisy, which is listed as imperiled. Invasive plant species have found a place in the Horse Heaven Hills in the absence of the large number of grazers who formerly roamed the region.

Upon the arrival of horses, the Native Americans likely used them for hunting, depleting the existing game, including bison, pronghorn sheep, and elk. Despite being named for being a horse heaven, wild horses can only be seen grazing in some portions of the Horse Heaven Hills, especially to the west end of the range near Satus Pass. They spent a short time as the main grazing animal within the hills, but horses have largely been pushed out of the range, both by removal and by farming activity. Deer can still be found in small numbers throughout the Horse Heaven Hills. The Yakama Nation has recently reintroduced pronghorn sheep near Satus Pass.

A small paleontological survey in Benton County identified numerous fossilized skeletal remains, proving prehistoric mammoths, bisons, early horses, and other animals once populated the hills. The majority of the skeletal fragments were found in canyons under fine silt and sand. They date from 7,000 to 12,000 years old, with some specimens found to be even older. The higher altitudes where the specimens were found indicate the now extinct animals survived the Missoula Floods that occurred toward the end of the last Ice Age. A research foundation was established to help fund research occurring at a dig site that is unearthing a mammoth south of Kennewick.
