= Rhythmite =

Layers of sediment or sedimentary rock laid down with periodicity and regularity

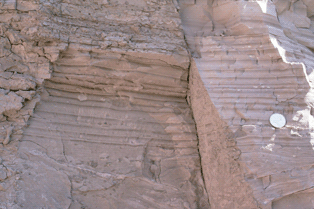
Pleistocene age varves at Scarborough Bluffs, Toronto, Ontario, Canada. The thickest varves are close to 2 cm thick.

A rhythmite consists of layers of sediment or sedimentary rock which are laid down with an obvious periodicity and regularity. They may be created by annual processes such as seasonally varying deposits reflecting variations in the runoff cycle, by shorter term processes such as tides, or by longer term processes such as periodic floods.

Rhythmites serve a significant role in unraveling prehistoric events, providing insights into sea level change, glaciation change, and Earth's orbital variations which serve to answer questions about climate change.

== Annually-laminated rhythmites ==
Annually-laminated deposits (varves) are rhythmites with annual periodicity: annual layers of sediment or sedimentary rock are laid down through seasonal variations that result from precipitation, or from temperature, which influences precipitation rates and debris loads in runoff. Of the many rhythmites found in the geological record, varves are among the most important and illuminating to studies of past climate change. Varves are amongst the finest resolution events easily recognised in stratigraphy.

== Periodically laminated rhythmites ==
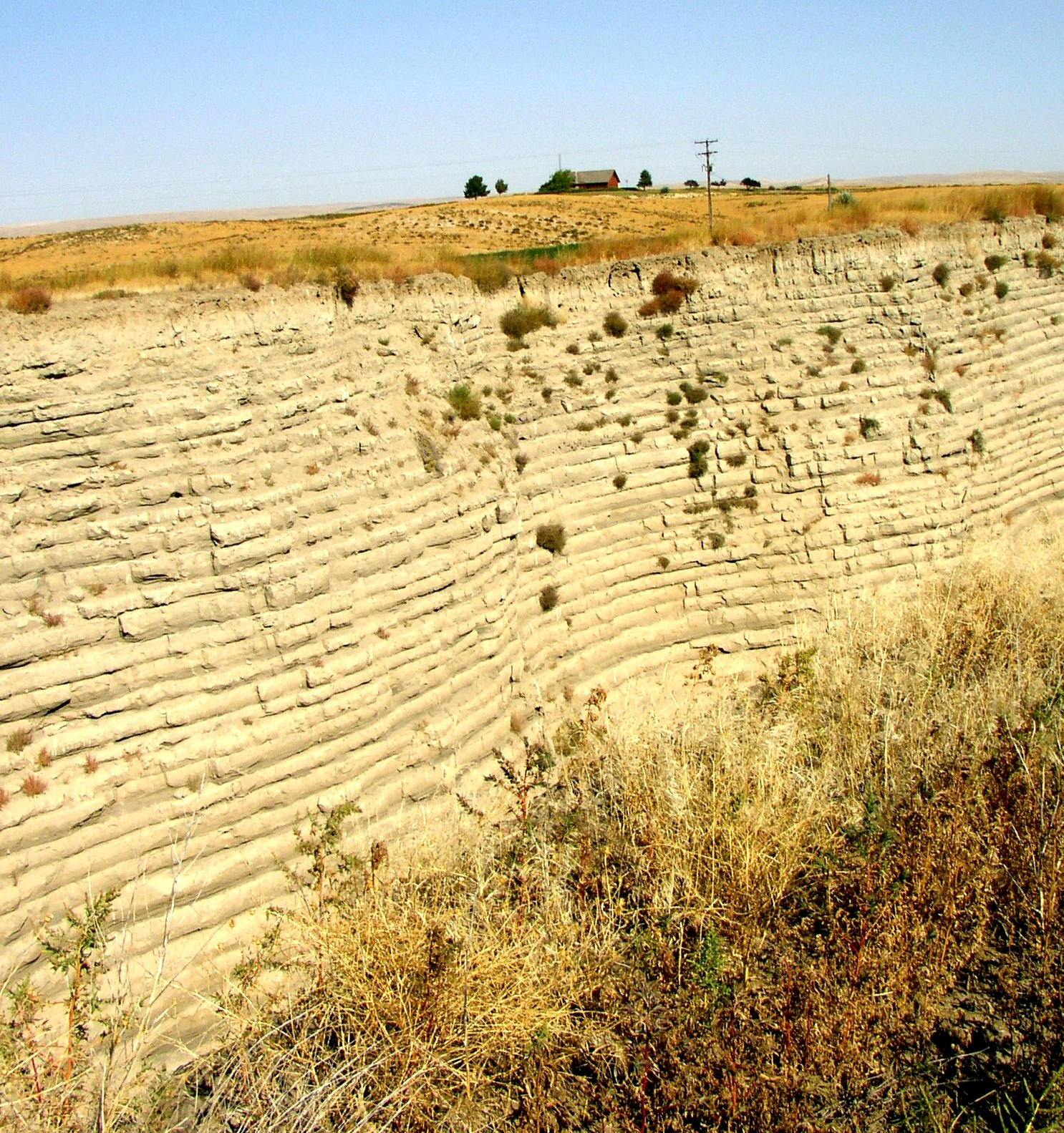
Distinct layers of Touchet beds in the "Little Grand Canyon" near Lowden in the Walla Walla valley, Washington

Rhythmites may be deposited with periodicities other than annual. The geologic record captures both more frequent events (e.g., tides) and less frequent events (glacial floods).

=== Tidal rhythmites ===
Geologic tidal rhythmites display layered Carboniferous Period beds which record tidal cyclical events such as semi-diurnal, diurnal or neap tide, spring tide cycle that demonstrate marine influence in sediments that were previously interpreted as purely continental. The geologic record captures layered beds comparable to those found currently in sediments in the Bay of Fundy in Canada and the Bay of Mont Saint-Michel in France. The Storm Mountain area of Big Cottonwood Canyon, Utah, has rhythmites which record sea-level sedimentary deposit fluctuations consistent with the cycle of the tides. Tidal rhythmites are also known from other geological periods and times, such as the late Precambrian.

=== Proglacial rhythmites ===
One common mechanism is the episodic flooding which results from glacial dam bursts. In one such example geologists estimate that the Missoula Floods cycle of flooding and reformation of the lake took an average of 55 years and that the floods occurred approximately 40 times over the 2,000-year period between 15,000 and 13,000 years ago. Distinct rhythmites with an approximately 55-year periodicity have been observed.

=== Glacial epicycle rhythmites ===
Sea-level changes which correspond to the glacial periods also show up as extremely long-term rhythmites. As an example, the ice surge in the Quaternary resulted in changes in sea level of 127 meters to 163 meters. The regression and transgression of the sea level from waxing and waning glaciers have been identified in the rhythmites of the Pennsylvanian and Permian periods.

== See also ==
- Dendrochronology
- Dendroclimatology
- Touchet Formation
