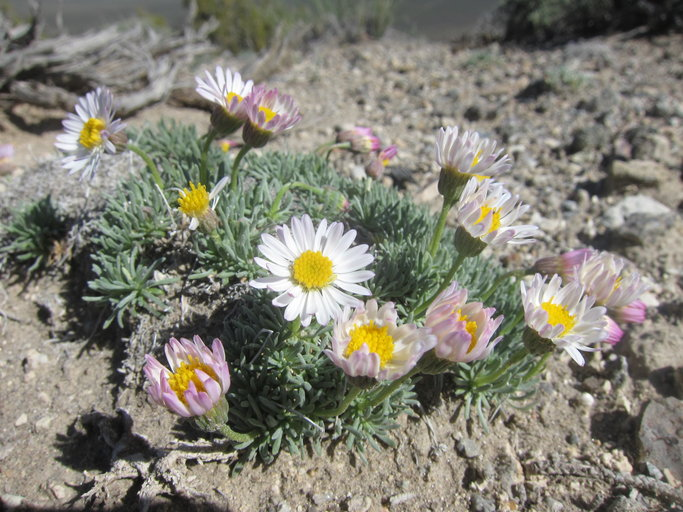

Conservation status
- Vulnerable (NatureServe)

Scientific classification
- Kingdom: Plantae
- Clade: Tracheophytes
- Clade: Angiosperms
- Clade: Eudicots
- Clade: Asterids
- Order: Asterales
- Family: Asteraceae
- Genus: Erigeron
- Species: E. compactus

Binomial name
- Erigeron compactus S.F.Blake

Synonyms
- Erigeron pulvinatus Rydb. 1917, illegitimate homonym not Weddell 1857

= Erigeron compactus =

Species of flowering plant

Erigeron compactus is a species of flowering plant in the family Asteraceae known by the common names cushion daisy, fernleaf fleabane, and compact daisy.

== Distribution ==
Erigeron compactus is native to the woodlands and slopes of the western United States. It has been found in Nevada, western Utah, and eastern California (El Dorado, Mono, Inyo, San Bernardino Counties, and extreme eastern Fresno County).

== Description ==
Erigeron compactus is a small perennial herb rarely reaching a maximum height of 10 centimeters (4 inches). It grows in fuzzy patches and clumps of fleshy leaves, each no more than 2.5 centimeters (1 inche) long and somewhat rounded in cross-section. It erects short, hairy stems each holding a single flower head about a centimeter (0.4 inches) wide. The head has a yellow center of disc florets surrounded by white, pink, or bicolored (white with lilac stripe) ray florets.
