= Wallula Gap =

Water gap in Washington, U.S.

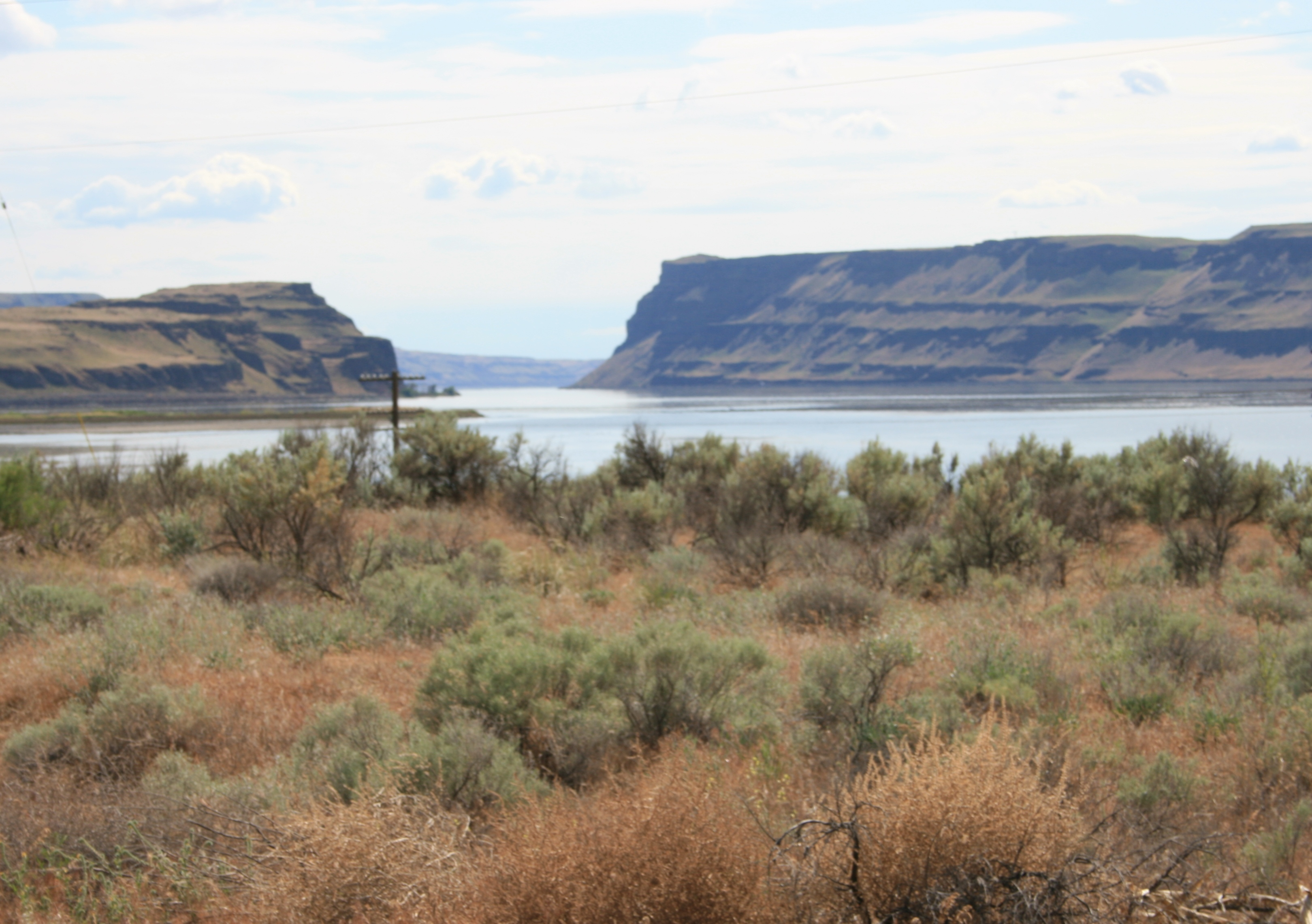
- View from northeast in 2008, from Main Street in Wallula

- Location within the United States Location within Washington (state)
- Location: Columbia River Basin, Washington, U.S.
- Nearest city: Kennewick
- Coordinates: 46°02′40″N 118°56′48″W
- Designated: 1980; 46 years ago

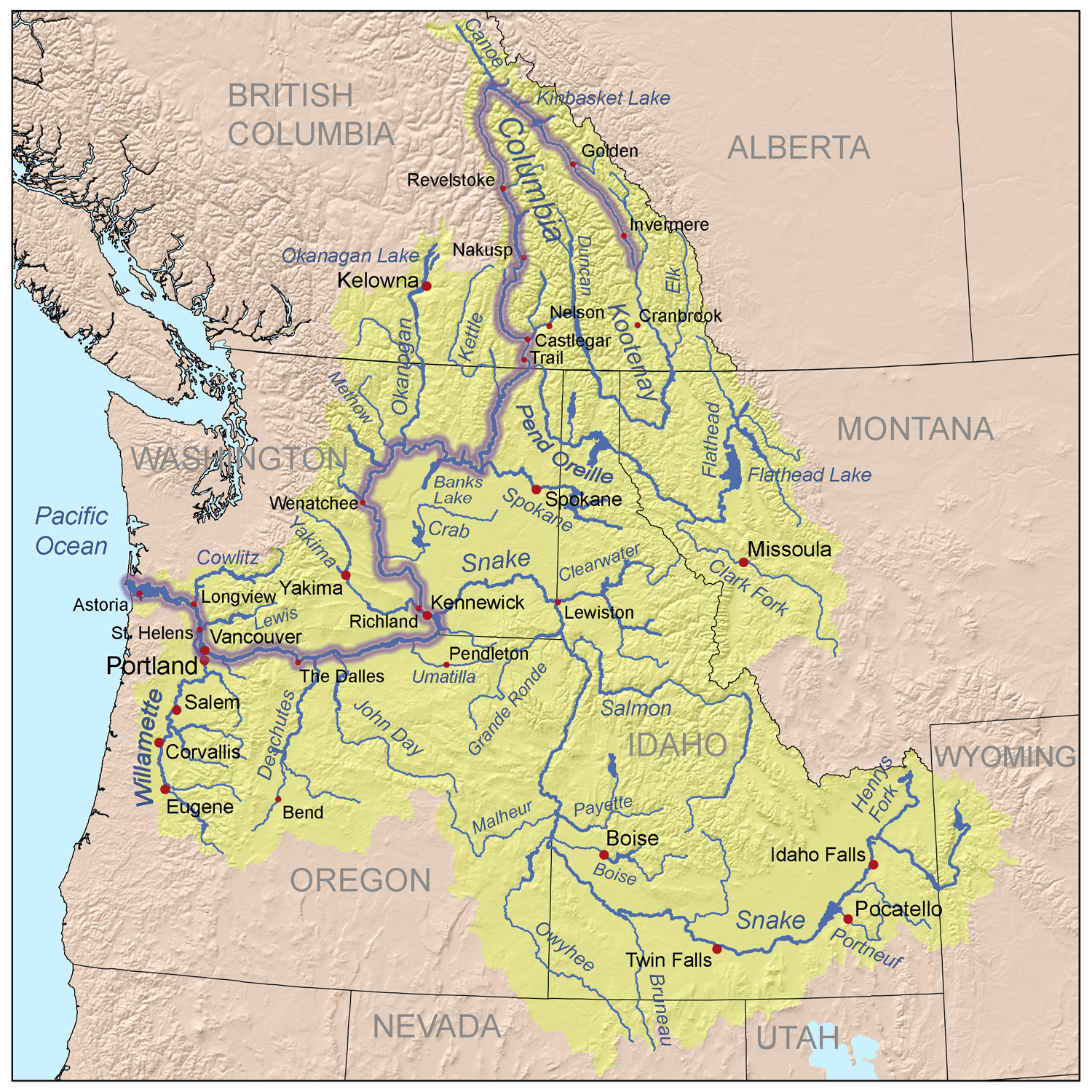
Columbia River Basin

Wallula Gap (/wəˈluːlə/) is a large water gap of the Columbia River in the Northwestern United States, in Southeastern Washington. It cuts through the Horse Heaven Hills basalt anticlines in the Columbia River Basin, just south of the confluence of the Walla Walla and Columbia rivers.

The National Park Service has recognized the gap as a National Natural Landmark, as a site that provides an important illustration of the geological history of the United States.

== Geology ==
=== Flood basalts ===
In southeastern Washington, Eastern Oregon, and southern Idaho, flood basalt flows of extremely fluid basaltic lava spread in all directions from long fissures, building broad fields of gently sloping lava that spread widely over great distances. Along the Snake River in Idaho, and the Columbia River in Washington and Oregon, these lava flows have been extensively exposed by erosion (with extensive displays of columnar basalt), and measure almost 2 km (1.2 mi) in total thickness.

The basalts flows which are visible in the Wallula Gap were laid down during the Miocene Epoch, about 17 million years ago. They are part of the massive fissure flood basalts of the Columbia River Basalt Group. During the basalt eruptions, the southern and western Columbia Plateau, which included the current location of the Wallula Gap, began to fold. The bending (or shear) of the ancient lava flows is clearly visible in the folded layers of basalt exposed in the steep walls of the gap.

=== Creation of the Wallula Gap ===
Early in the history of folding, the ridge crest at Wallula Gap must have been the lowest along the ridge. The ancient Salmon-Clearwater River began to flow across the ridge over this low point, cutting a channel. As the ridge continued to fold upward, erosion cut through and the water gap was formed.

Until about ten million years ago, the Salmon-Clearwater River flowed through the Wallula Gap alone. As the flood plain in the Columbia Basin continued to tilt, the Columbia River was forced eastward and joined the Salmon-Clearwater River about six million years ago. About 2.5 million years ago, the Snake River was forced northward by the Blue Mountain uplift and was captured by the Salmon-Clearwater River near the Idaho-Oregon border.

=== Missoula floods ===
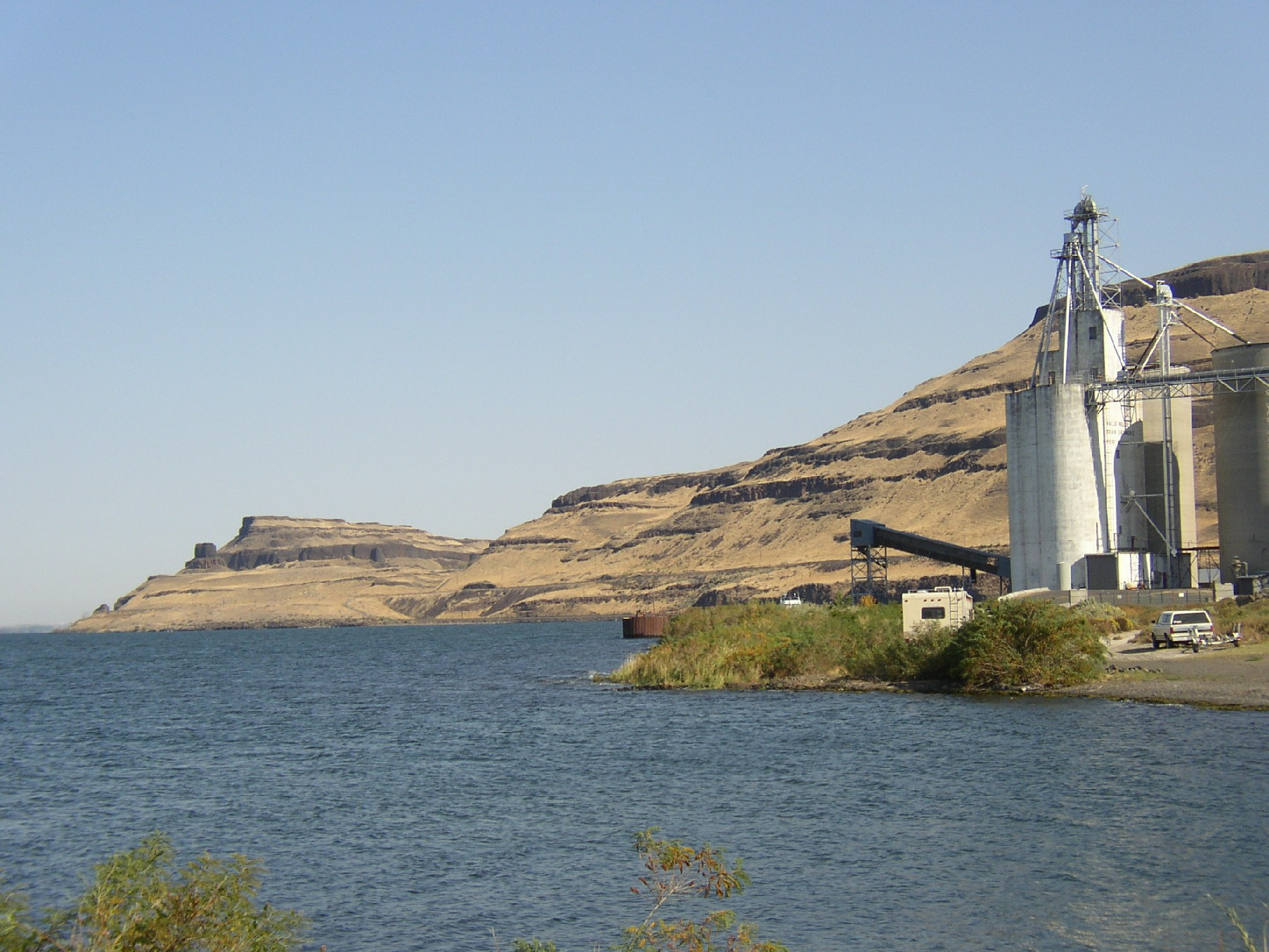
View to the north from about the midway point within the Wallula Gap

The Wallula Gap was widened about the 14th millennium BC, by the historic flow of the Salmon, Snake, and Columbia rivers combined with the glacial waters that poured across the Channeled Scablands during the Missoula floods. The Wallula Gap constrained the flow such that less than 1/5 of the 800 km^{3} (190 mi^{3}) of water per day entering could be discharged as it passed into Lake Condon downstream. As a result, the floods filled the Pasco Basin and formed, for a short period, Lake Lewis. The large volumes of flood water passing through the gap contributed substantially to the erosion of the gap, as is evidenced by the shear walls and by scab-features such as "Twin Sisters".

During the Missoula floods, water backed up in the Pasco Basin because of the narrow opening of the Wallula Gap. The floods were so large in volume that they could not rapidly discharge through the gap, even though it is 2 km (1.2 mi) wide. Maximum flood waters reached elevations of about 380 meters. The hydraulic head required to drive the flood waters through the gap, combined with the elevated levels downstream of the constriction resulted in a head of about 250 meters. The peak flow is estimated to have been about 10 million cubic meters per second.

== History ==
=== Lewis and Clark ===
The Lewis and Clark Expedition (a.k.a. Corps of Discovery) first saw the Wallula Gap on October 18, 1805, as they headed downstream from their camp at the confluence of the Columbia and Snake rivers. The Corps camped near Spring Gulch Creek that night, and proceeded through Wallula Gap the next day.

=== Oregon trail ===
In the 1840s, pioneers headed west on the Oregon Trail found Wallula a logical stopping place to convert their wagons to boats and then continue the trip via the Columbia River.

== Legend ==
=== Twin Sisters basalt ===
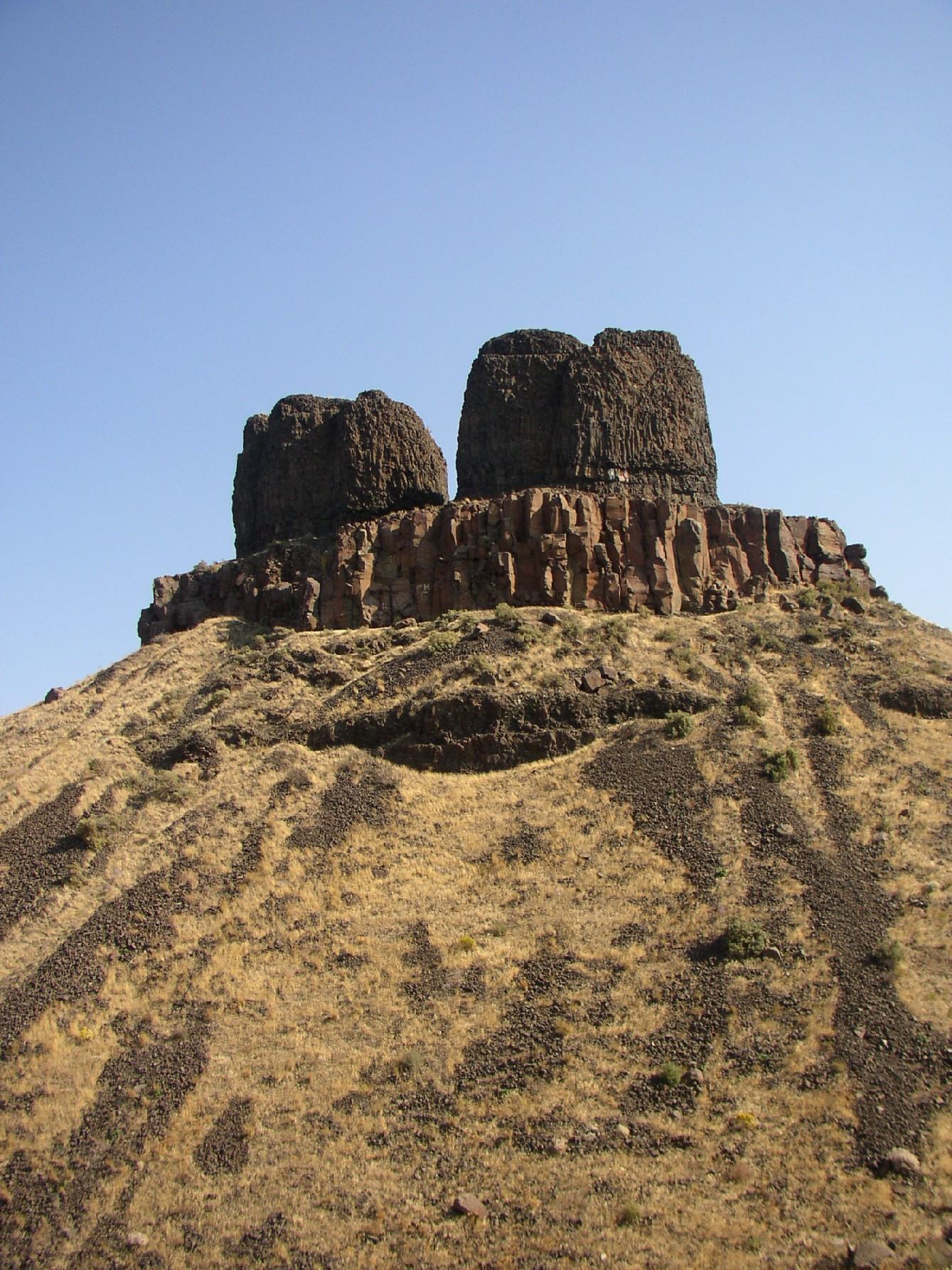
Twin Sisters: a scabland residual of the Missoula Floods on the east bank of the Columbia River in the Wallula Gap

Twin Sisters is a basalt pillar that inspired the mythology of the Wallula Gap near the Columbia River just upstream of Port Kelley, Washington. According to the Cayuse Indian tribe, who lived on the Columbia Plateau, the following legend recounts the origin of the rocks:

Coyote, the Trickster spirit hero of many native stories, fell in love with three sisters who were building a salmon trap on the river near here. Each night Coyote would destroy their trap, and each day the girls would rebuild it. One morning Coyote saw the girls crying and found out that they were starving because they had not been able to catch any fish in their trap. Coyote promised them a working fish trap if they would become his wives. They agreed, and Coyote kept his promise; however, over the years he became jealous of them. He changed two of the wives into these basalt pillars and turned the third into a cave downstream. He became a rock nearby so he could watch over them forever.

This site is a popular hiking destination for avid hikers who want to view the geology of the Wallula Gap and the effects of the ancient Missoula Floods.

== Images ==
Vistas
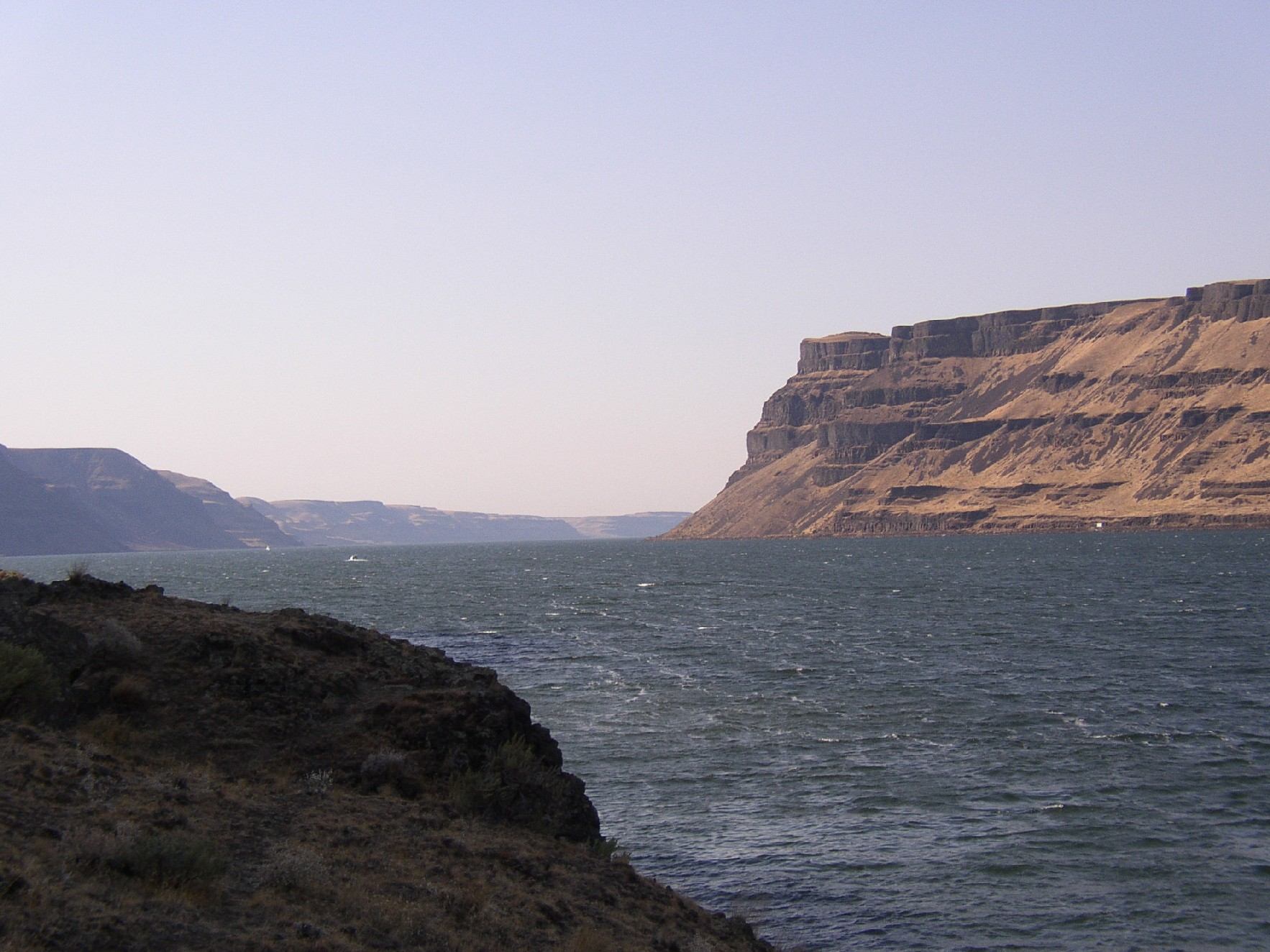
View from the northern end toward the south within the Wallula Gap

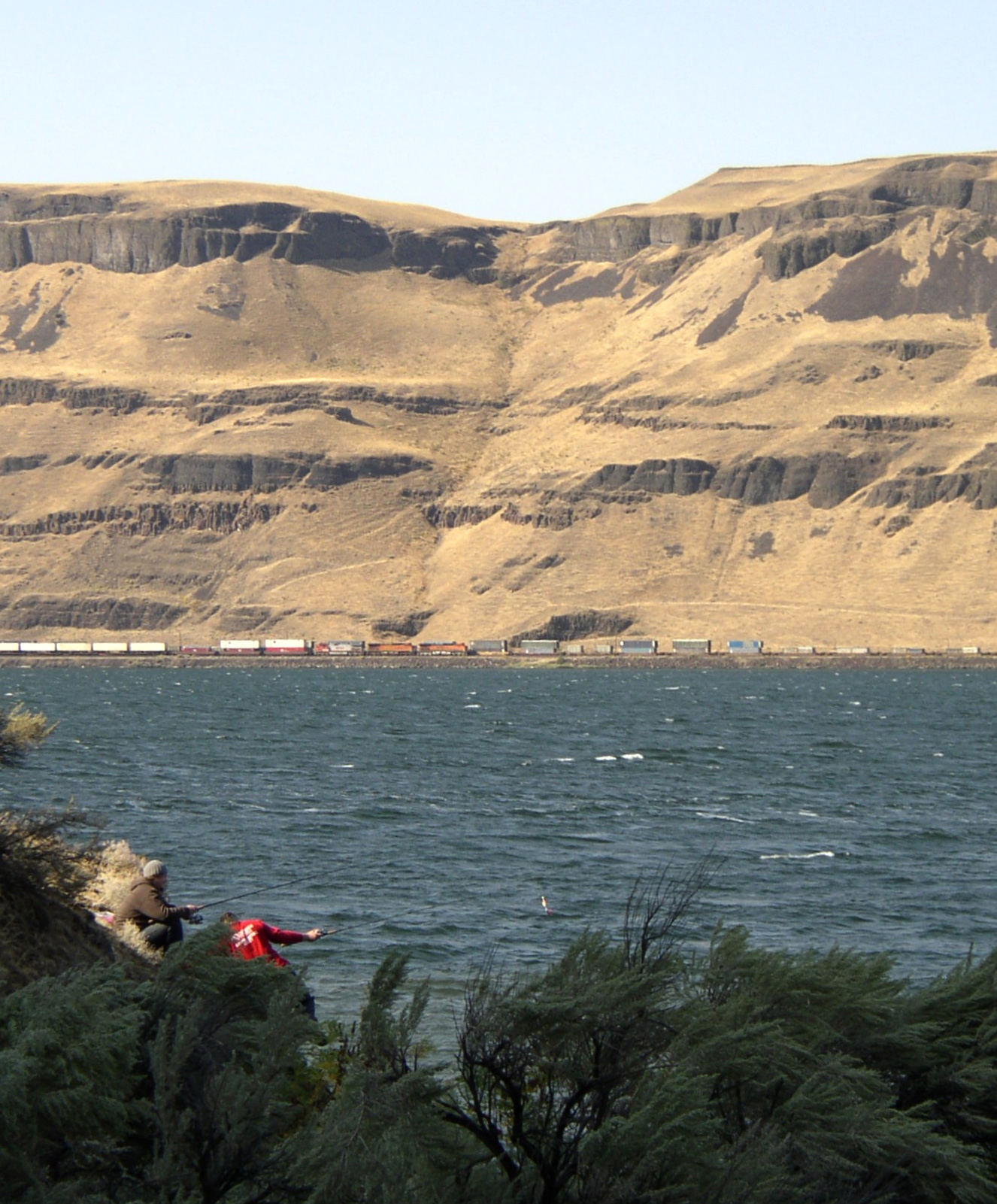
View to the west across the Wallula Gap
