= Lewis Lake (Massachusetts) =

Lake in Massachusetts, United States

- Location within Massachusetts Location within the United States
- Location: Suffolk County, Massachusetts
- Coordinates: 42°22′23″N 70°58′24″W
- Basin countries: United States
- Surface elevation: 3 ft (1 m)
- Settlements: Winthrop

Lewis Lake is a lake in the U.S. state of Massachusetts. It is located 0.5 mi southeast of Winthrop.

== History ==
Lewis Lake is named after Orlando E. Lewis, an American Civil War veteran from the state of Ohio who later moved to Winthrop, becoming actively involved as an entrepreneur in local industries.

Lewis Lake was originally considered part of Winthrop's Crystal Cove, but the construction of the pile bridge for Washington Avenue in 1883-1884 caused it to become partially isolated from the rest of the cove. Further construction from 1907-1912 completely enclosed the lake, and it was established as a park in the late 1920s.
