= Lewis Lake (Kanabec County, Minnesota) =

Lake in the state of Minnesota, United States

- Location within Minnesota
- Location: Kanabec County, Minnesota
- Coordinates: 45°44′37″N 93°21′55″W
- Type: lake

Lewis Lake is a lake in Kanabec County, in the U.S. state of Minnesota.

Lewis Lake bears the name of a pioneer who settled there.

== See also ==
- List of lakes in Minnesota
