= Lake Lewis =

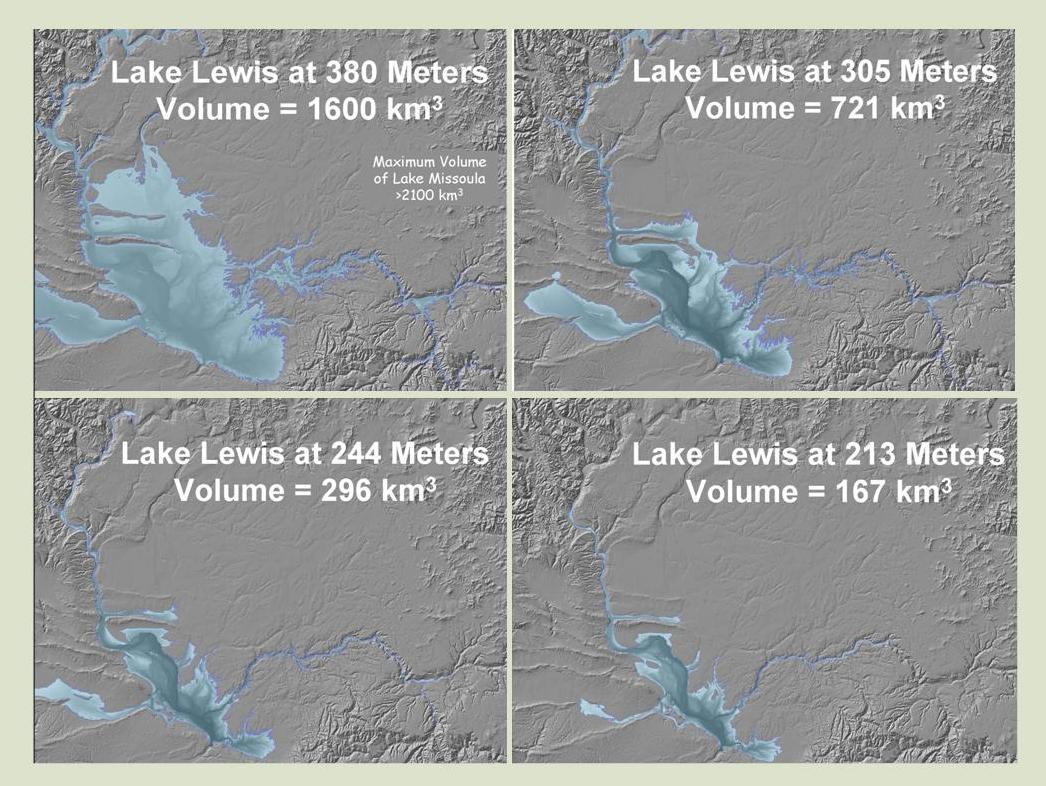
- This figure shows four profiles of Lake Lewis at various flood levels. It illustrates that the lake back flooded several valleys in which the Touchet Beds were found.

- Location within Washington (state) Location within the United States
- Location: North America
- Coordinates: 46°10′N 119°00′W
- Lake type: Former lake
- Primary inflows: Channeled Scablands
- Primary outflows: Wallula Gap of the Columbia River
- Basin countries: United States
- Max. length: 105 mi (169 km)
- Max. width: 130 mi (210 km)
- Max. depth: 320 ft (98 m)
- Residence time: 20 incidents
- Surface elevation: 1,200 ft (366 m)
- References: Carson, Robert J.; Pogue, Kevin R. (1996). Flood Basalts and Glacier Floods:Roadside Geology of Parts of Walla Walla, Franklin, and Columbia Counties, Washington. Washington State Department of Natural Resources (Washington Division of Geology and Earth Resources Information Circular 90). ISBN none.

Lake Lewis was a large transient lake (lasting only days to weeks) in the Pacific Northwest region of North America, formed by periodic Missoula Floods along the Columbia River paleocourse between 21,000 and 16,000 years ago.

Lake Lewis was formed when the restricted flow of waters from periodic cataclysmic floods from Glacial Lake Missoula, pluvial Lake Bonneville, and perhaps from subglacial outbursts, backed up through the constriction formed by the Wallula Gap in the Horse Heaven Hills (southern Washington). Water also backed up further downstream on the Columbia River between Washington and Oregon, delaying the drainage of Lake Lewis. The water remained for a period of weeks before the flood waters drained through Wallula Gap, just southeast of the Tri-Cities area. Lake Lewis reached an elevation of about 1,200 feet (370 m) above sea level (today's sea level) before subsiding.

Lake Lewis also flooded the Yakima, Walla Walla, Touchet and Tucannon river valleys.

== Evidence for Lake Lewis ==
=== Wallula Gap ===
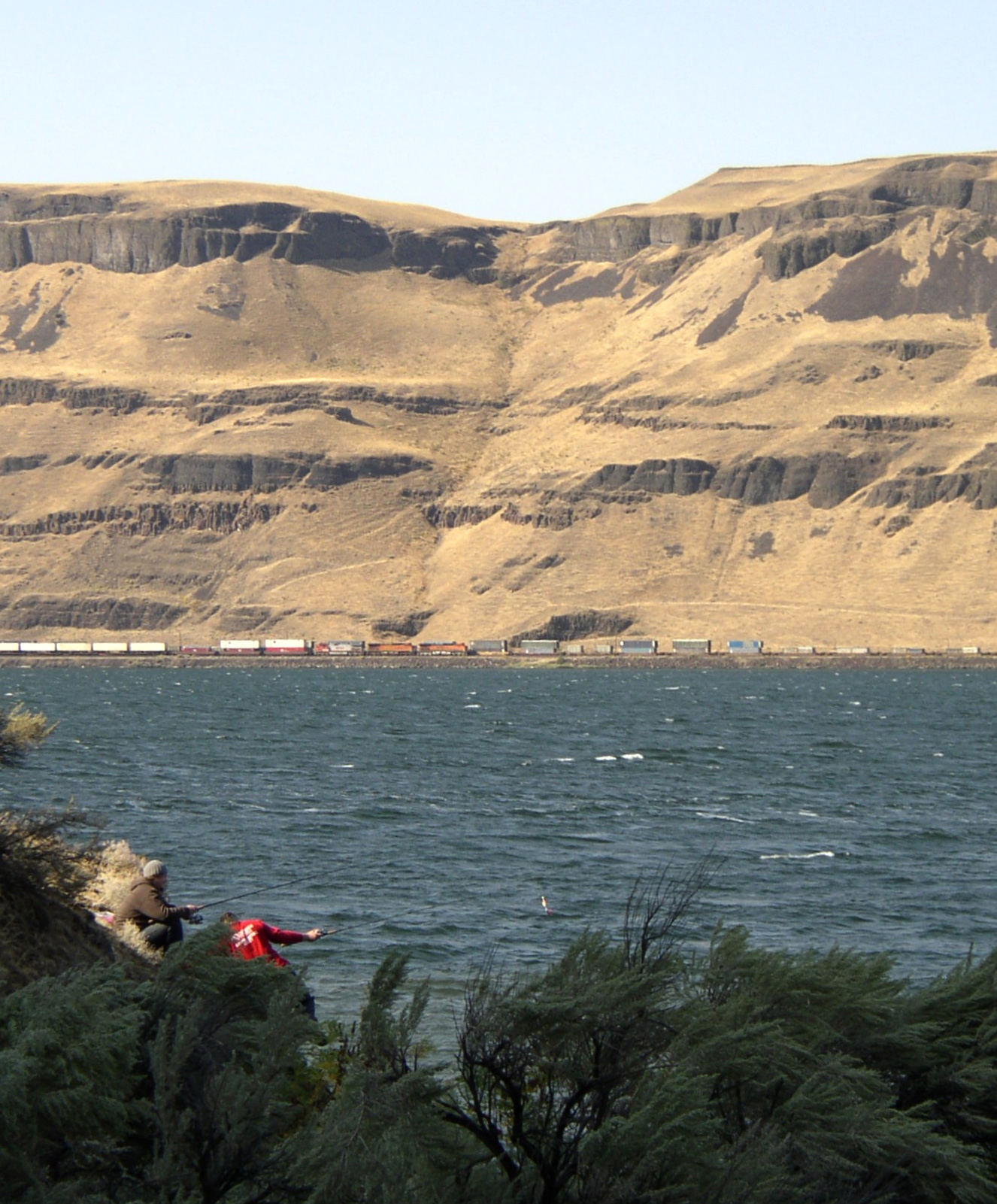
Looking to the West across the Wallula Gap.

Wallula Gap is a large water gap through basalt anticlines in the Columbia River basin just south of the confluence of the Walla Walla River and the Columbia River. The Wallula Gap, which has existed for many millions of years, was widened by the prehistoric flow of the Salmon-Snake and Columbia Rivers combined with the glacial waters that poured across the Channeled Scablands during the Missoula Floods. The Wallula Gap constrained the flow such that less than 1/5 of the 800 km^{3} of water per day entering could be discharged. As a result, the floods filled the Pasco Basin and formed, for a short period, Lake Lewis. The large volumes of flood water passing through the gap contributed substantially to the erosion of the gap, as is evidenced by the shear walls and of scab-features such as the "Sisters."

=== Touchet Formation ===
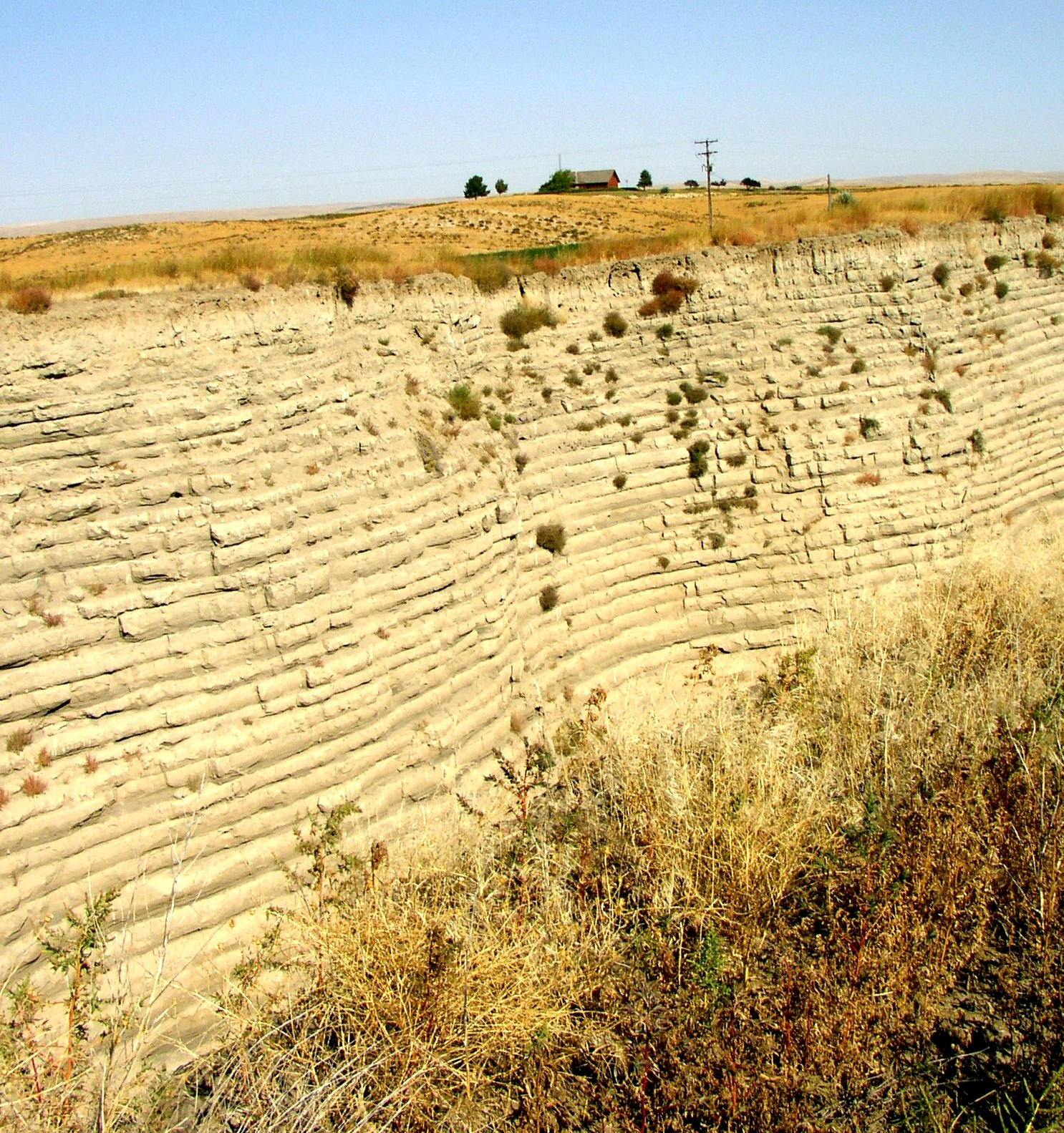
Touchet beds in the "Little Grand Canyon" near Lowden in the Walla Walla valley. Note distinct layers.

Lake Lewis backflooded into the Yakima, Walla Walla, Touchet and Tucannon River Valleys. In these relatively calm arms of the lake, the slackwaters were thick with suspended materials eroded from the scablands above. Some of the suspended materials settled out, creating thick Touchet Formation layers which are found throughout these valleys.

=== Glacial erratics ===
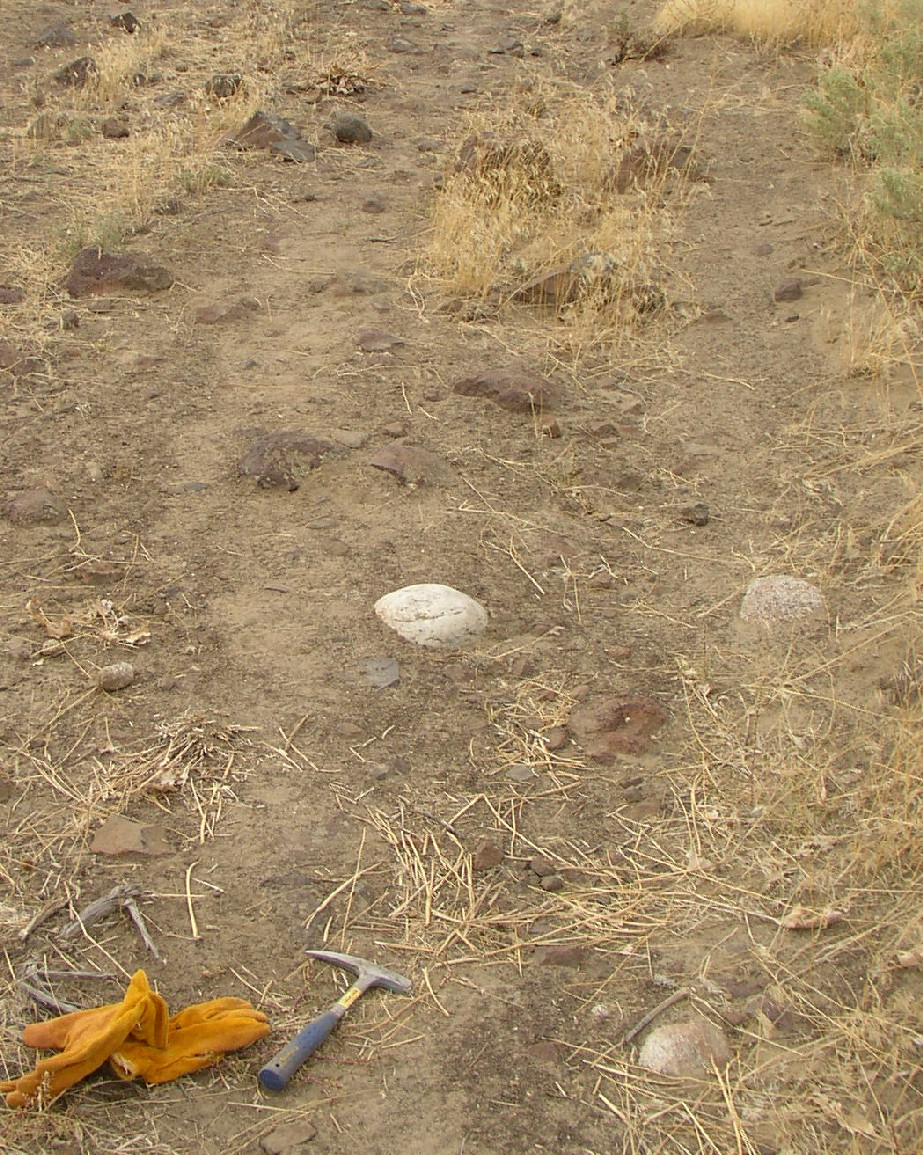
Cluster of erratics on Red Mountain shown in the foreground; these were trapped in glacial ice and "rafted in" on the flood of Lake Lewis. In the background the native basalt, which covers the rest of the mountain ridge, is visible.

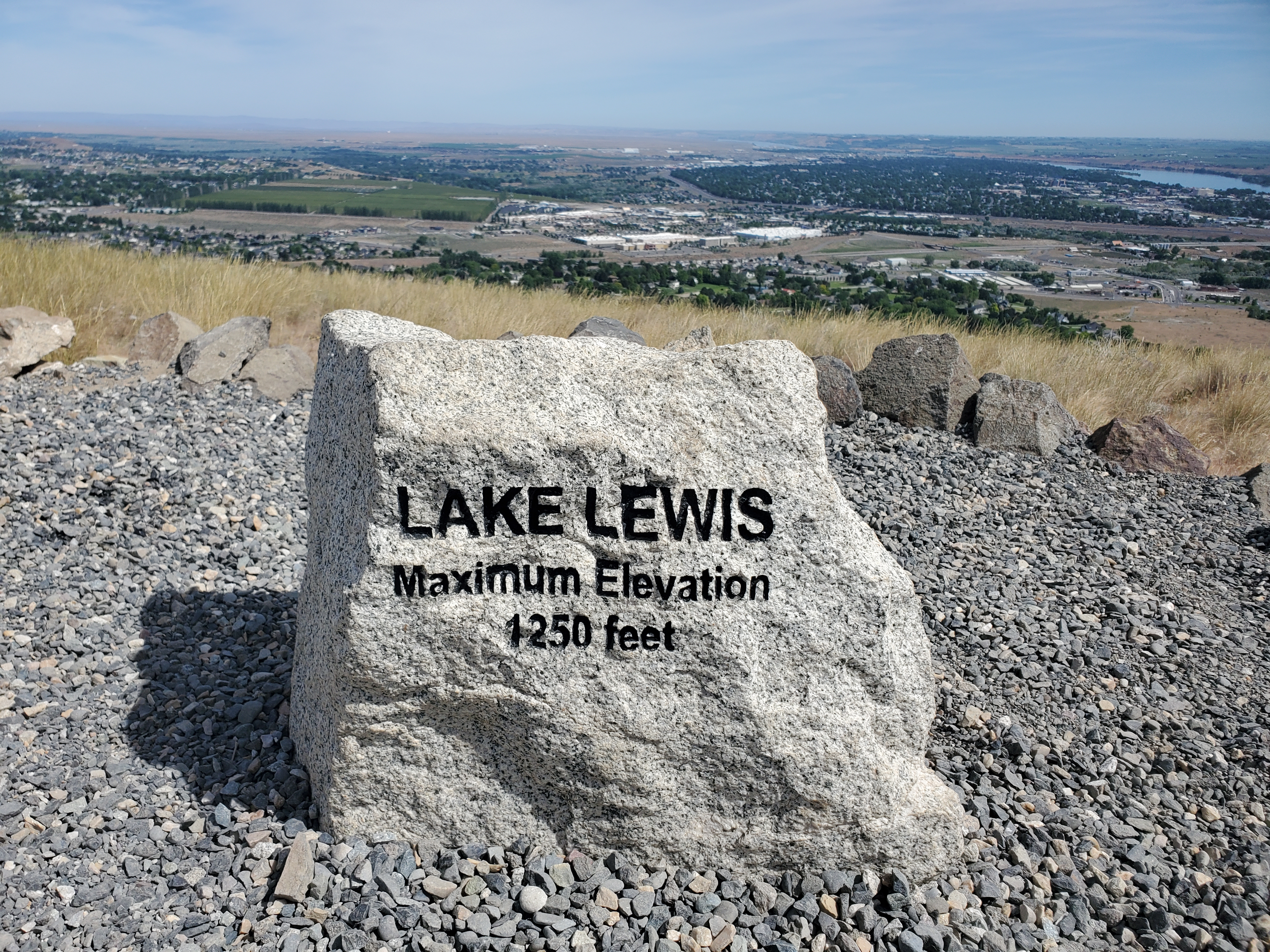
Badger Mountain trail marker indicating Lake Lewis water line.

The maximum elevation of the flood, as established by other indications, is confirmed by glacial erratics, which were stranded on the slopes of the Horse Heaven Hills and other elevated regions in the mid-Columbia at elevations of up to 1,200 feet (370 m) above sea level. There were several long ridges (Saddle Mountains, Frenchman Hills, and Rattlesnake Mountain) that were above flood level. Peaks like the Badger, Candy, and Red Mountains were islands. At this level, much of the Columbia Basin would have been submerged.
