= Jerry Lawrence Provincial Park =

Provincial park in Nova Scotia

- Location within Nova Scotia
- Type: Provincial Park
- Location: Upper Tantallon, Nova Scotia, Canada
- Nearest city: Tantallon, Nova Scotia
- Coordinates: 44°41′25″N 63°51′10″W
- Area: 746.92 hectares (1,845.7 acres)

Jerry Lawrence Provincial Park is a provincial park in the Canadian province of Nova Scotia, in Upper Tanatallon. It is located on Route 3, approximately 25 kilometres (15.5 miles) west of Halifax.

The park is a small picnic park and has an area specially developed for seniors and people with disabilities. It features include picnic tables, a picnic shelter, a wheelchair-accessible fishing wharf, and a trail that connects to a rails to trails network. Parking areas and drive-in picnic sites are conveniently located close to all facilities, including a barrier-free vault toilet. Round Lake each season is stocked with brook and rainbow trout and in 2018 was stocked with salmon.

== History ==
Formerly called Lewis Lake Provincial Park, the park was renamed in 2007 to honour the former radio host and cabinet minister Jerry Lawrence, who played a key role in developing recreation opportunities in the park for people with disabilities. Thanks to Lawrence's vision many of the park's features make the area more accessible for all visitors.

== Park lakes ==
=== Round Lake ===
The park is open for day use (from dawn to dusk) from May 15 to October 12. There is no charge for using the park and its facilities.

Jerry Lawrence Provincial Park was established by Order in Council (OIC) on January 25, 1977. The civic address Upper Tantallon, Nova Scotia.
