= Nick Zentner =

American geologist (born 1962)

- Born: July 20, 1962 (age 64); Fort Atkinson, Wisconsin, US
- Occupation: Professor
- Spouse: Liz Zentner
- Children: 3
- Awards: GSA Public Service Award, E. R. Ward Neale Medal, James H. Shea Award

Academic background
- Education: University of Wisconsin–Madison (BS); Idaho State University (MS)

Academic work
- Discipline: Geology
- Sub-discipline: Geology of the Pacific Northwest
- Institutions: Miami University; Central Washington University
- Website: nickzentner.com

Nick Zentner is an American academic who works as a geology professor at Central Washington University in Ellensburg, Washington. Outside of his work with the university, he is known for his online videos covering the geology of the Northwestern United States and his series Nick on the Rocks.

== Early life and education ==
Zentner was born on July 20, 1962, in Fort Atkinson, Wisconsin. Inspired during a 1983 trip to the Pacific Northwest on break from college, Zentner decided to study geology. Zentner earned his Bachelor of Science from the University of Wisconsin–Madison in 1986 and a Master of Science from Idaho State University in 1989.

== Career ==
From 1989 to 1992 Zentner taught geology at the Miami University in Oxford, Ohio. After that, he took on his current position teaching geology at Central Washington University in Ellensburg, Washington.

He is known for his work in making online videos and public lectures covering the geology of the Northwestern United States. Starting in the mid-2000s, he gave lectures to the public about local geology topics, such as one on the Columbia River Basalt Group. These led to the production of a series of shorts he made called Two Minute Geology. He then produced the series Nick on the Rocks that is aired on KCTS-TV to the Seattle metropolitan area.

During the COVID-19 pandemic Zentner created live streaming lectures on various geology topics in a series called Nick From Home. In the Nick From Home series he focused on trying to provide an educational environment for children who might be out of school and to viewers from around the world. After 3-years hiatus of COVID, in 2023 a 5th season of Nick on the Rocks was agreed upon. In 2025 the 6th season was broadcast.

Zentner geology academic interests are broad. They have included Missoula floods (founded Ellensburg Chapter IAFI in 2007 and president later), Baja B.C. hypothesis, geology of indigenous peoples, Eocene, Cascades and Alaska. Zentner requests and promotion of historic fieldnotes in 2023, let to the digitization of the fieldnotes, news items and expeditions of Bretz, Pardee, Large and Flint. Moreover, Nick convinced rightholders to allow public access and usage of the works.

== Personal life ==
Zentner is a practicing Catholic and is married to a science teacher at Ellensburg High School. They have three sons.

== Honors and awards ==
In 2015, Zentner won the James H. Shea Award presented by the National Association of Geoscience Teachers for his work in presenting the geology of the Pacific Northwest to a broad audience. Two episodes of Nick on the Rocks, "Teanaway Tropics" and "Saddle Mountains Buried in Ash", were granted Northwest Emmy Awards by the National Academy of Television Arts and Sciences on June 5, 2021.

In 2023, he was also presented with the GSA Public Service Award by The Geological Society of America. In 2024, Zentner was recognized by the Geological Association of Canada with their E. R. Ward Neale Medal for sustained outstanding efforts in sharing Earth science with Canadians.

In 2025 Nick won the YouTube Silver Creator Award.

== Publications ==
- Extension and Subsidence of the Eastern Snake River Plain, Idaho (2002), Idaho Geological Survey Bulletin no. 30.
