= Overdeepening =

Characteristic of basins and valleys eroded by glaciers

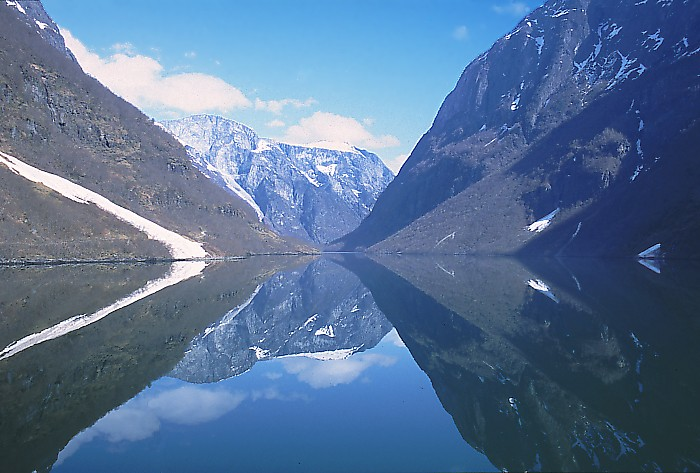
Sognefjord in Norway, the second longest fjord in the world, shows characteristic overdeepening.

Overdeepening is a characteristic of basins and valleys eroded by glaciers. An overdeepened valley profile is often eroded to depths which are hundreds of metres below the lowest continuous surface line (the thalweg) along a valley or watercourse. This phenomenon is observed under modern-day glaciers, in saltwater fjords and freshwater lakes remaining after glaciers melt, as well as in tunnel valleys which are partially or totally filled with sediment. When the channel produced by a glacier is filled with debris, the subsurface geomorphic structure is found to be erosionally cut into bedrock and subsequently filled by sediments. These overdeepened cuts into bedrock structures can reach a depth of several hundred metres below the valley floor.

Overdeepened fjords and lakes have significant economic value as harbours and fisheries. Overdeepened basins and valleys filled with sediment (termed tunnel valleys) are of particular interest to engineers, petroleum geologists, and hydrologists; engineers apply the information for developing foundations and tunnel construction, petroleum geologists use tunnel valley locations to identify potential oil fields, while hydrologists apply this knowledge for groundwater resource management.

== Main types ==
Overdeepening is exhibited across the range of glacially eroded geologic features. It is common to fjords, fjord lakes and cirques formed by glaciers constrained by mountainous terrain as well as tunnel valleys formed on the periphery to the continental glaciers which characterize ice ages.

=== Fjords ===
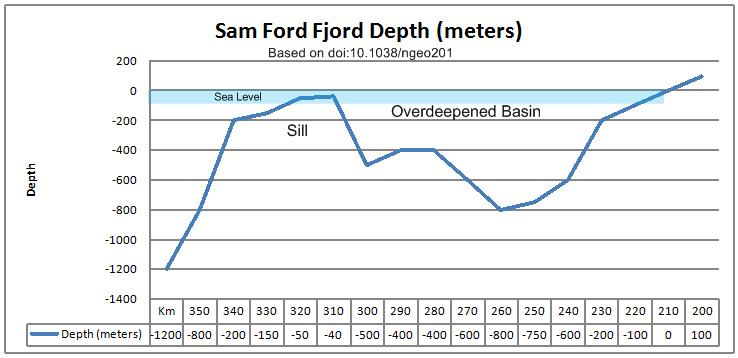
Classic depth profile of an overdeepened fjord

Fjords are formed when a glacier cuts a U-shaped valley by erosion of the surrounding bedrock. Most fjords are overdeepened (i.e., deeper than the adjacent sea). Fjords generally have a sill or rise at their mouth caused by reduced erosion toward the mouth and added to by the previous glacier's terminal moraine, in some cases causing extreme tidal currents with accompanying saltwater rapids.

The Sognefjord in Norway stretches 205 kilometres (127 mi) inland. It reaches a maximum depth of 1,308 metres (4,291 ft) below sea level, and, as is characteristic of overdeepening, the greatest depths are found in the inland parts of the fjord. Near its mouth, the bottom rises abruptly to a sill about 100 metres (330 ft) below sea level. The average width of the main branch of the Sognefjord is about 4.5 kilometres (2.8 mi). Cliffs surrounding the fjord rise almost sheer from the water to heights of 1,000 metres (3,300 ft) and more. The Skelton Inlet in Antarctica shows similar overdeepening to 1,933 m (6,342 ft), as does the Messier Channel in Chile which deepens to 1,288 m (4,226 ft).

Geirangerfjord in Norway which descends to 600 metres (2,000 ft) below sea level

Nesje writes "...glaciers are necessary for fjord formation. The strongest indication for glacial erosion is the overdeepening of fjord floors well below present and past sea level and their outer rock threshold. Measured in volume eroded within a limited time span, an ice stream forming its own clearly defined drainage channel (fjord) is apparently one of the most significant erosive agents in operation on Earth."

=== Fjord lakes ===
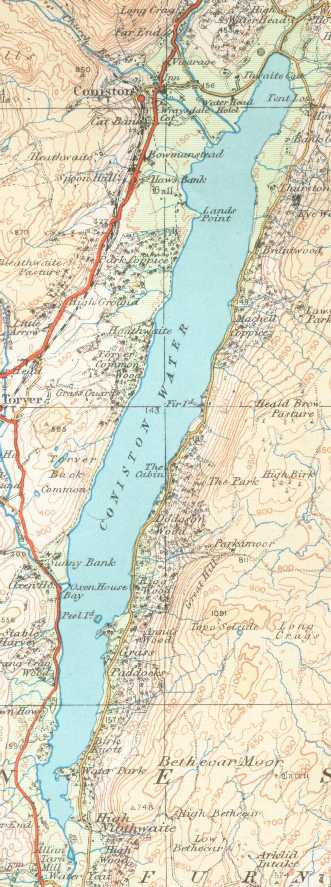
Coniston Water illustrates a typical fjord lake profile with length exceeding width by a factor of 10.

Some freshwater lakes which have formed in long glacially-carved valleys with extensive overdeepening and often with terminal moraines blocking the outlet are called fjords or "fjord lakes" (which follows the Norwegian fjord-naming convention). Fjord lakes are commonly formed in mountainous regions which channel ice flows through narrow valleys.

Although they exist in many countries, the fjord lakes found in British Columbia, Canada, are illustrative of their nature. There the interior plateau is dissected by numerous elongated, glacially overdeepened lakes. One such lake is Okanagan Lake, which is 3.5 km wide, 120 km long, and excavated by glacial erosion to over 2,000 m (6,562 ft) below the surrounding plateau (and 600 m (1,969 ft) below sea level), although much of that depth is filled with glacial sediment so that the current maximum lake depth is 232 m (761 ft). Similar fjord lakes in excess of 100 km (62 mi) in length are found elsewhere in British Columbia. Kootenay Lake located between the Selkirk and Purcell mountain ranges in the Kootenay region of British Columbia is approximately 100 km (62 mi) in length and 3–5 km in width formerly discharged through the Purcell Trench into Lake Missoula in Montana. Similarly tunnel channels in the Flathead Valley beneath Flathead Lake were formed by subglacial drainage from multiple sources such as northwest of the valley (the Rocky Mountain trench), north of the valley (the Whitefish Range), and northeast of the valley (the Middle and North Forks of the Flathead River) and funneled into the valley, exiting south eventually into the Mission Valley and glacial Lake Missoula. The bases of the tunnel channels are cut well below the elevation of Flathead Lake, indicating that erosion occurred in hydrostatically pressurized subglacial tunnel channels beneath the ice in British Columbia.

=== Tunnel valleys ===
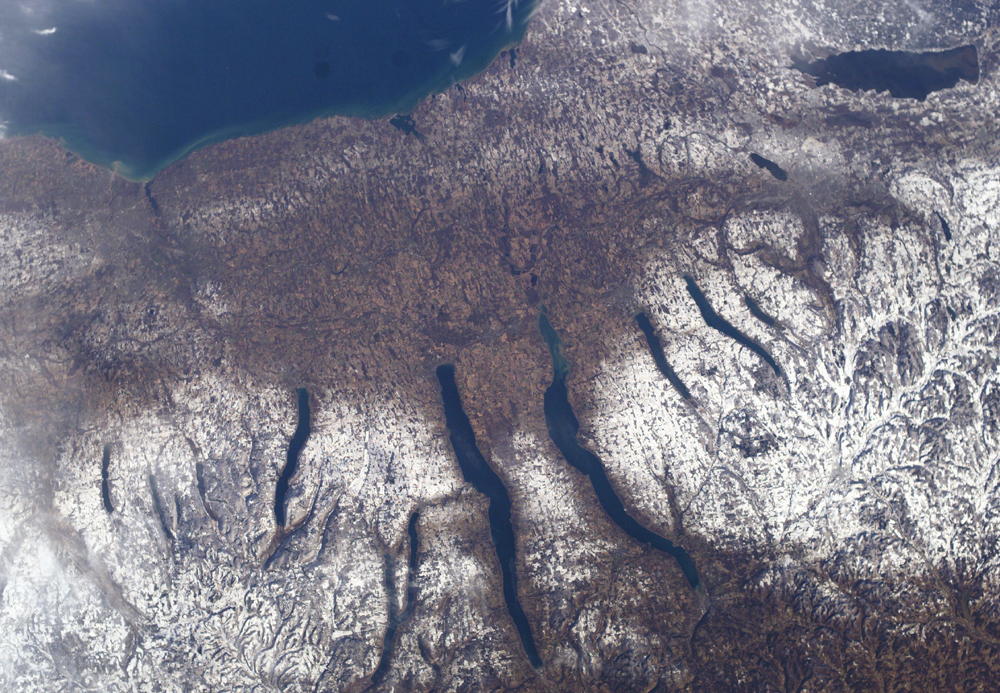
Lying south of Lake Ontario, the Finger Lakes of New York State formed in tunnel valleys.

A tunnel valley is a large, long, U-shaped valley originally cut under the glacial ice near the margin of continental ice sheets such as that now covering Antarctica and formerly covering portions of all continents during past glacial ages. They range in size (up to 100 km in length and up to 4 km in width). Tunnel valleys exhibit classical overdeepening with maximum depths that may vary between 50 and 400 m; they vary in depth along the long axis. Their cross-sections exhibit steep sided flanks (similar to fjord walls) and flat bottoms typical of subglacial glacial erosion. Tunnel valleys were formed by subglacial erosion by water and served as subglacial drainage pathways carrying large volumes of melt water. They presently appear as dry valleys, lakes, seabed depressions, and as areas filled with sediment. If they are filled with sediment their lower layers are filled primarily with glacial, glaciofluvial or glaciolacustrine sediment, supplemented by upper layers of temperate infill. They can be found in areas formerly covered by glacial ice sheets including Africa, Asia, North America, Europe, Australia and offshore in the North Sea, the Atlantic and in waters near Antarctica.

Tunnel valleys appear in the technical literature under several terms, including tunnel channels, subglacial valleys, and linear incisions.

=== Cirques ===
Formation of cirque

Rapid subglacial erosion produced overdeepenings, which have the glacier bed rising in the direction of the ice flow, may form in cirques near glacier heads. The concave amphitheatre shape is open on the downhill side corresponding to the flatter area of the stage, while the cupped seating section is generally steep cliff-like slopes down which ice and glaciated debris combine and converge from the three or more higher sides. The floor of the cirque ends up bowl shaped as it is the complex convergence zone of combining ice flows from multiple directions and their accompanying rock burdens, hence experiences somewhat greater erosion forces, and is most often scooped out somewhat below the level of cirque's low-side outlet (stage) and its down slope (backstage) valley. A tarn will form in the overdeepened region once the glacier has melted.

== Geomorphology ==
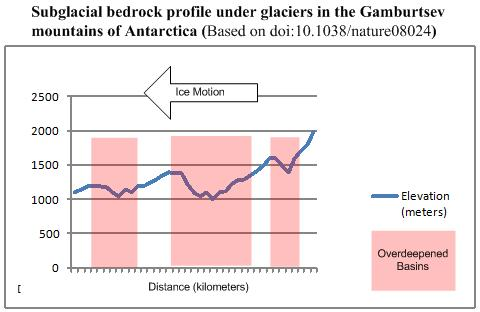
Overdeepened basins in the Gamburtsev Mountains of Antarctica

Glacial erosion proceeds by abrasion as ice and entrained debris moves across the underlying bedrock, by water induced erosion and transport of sediment, and by freeze-thaw cycles which weather the bedrock. All processes are most effective at the bottom of glacial ice – hence the glacier erodes at the bottom. The presence of ice in the gap reduces the rate at which the side walls weather, yielding steep side walls. When the course of glacial ice flow is constrained by surrounding topography, the narrowest regions of flow will abrade most rapidly and cut most deeply, even to depths over 1000 meters below sea level. The resulting profile, when observed through the ice with radar or when evident after the ice had melted, is referred to as overdeepened. Although research remains in fully understanding the processes involved, significant progress has been evident in the late 20th and early 21st centuries. This section details major elements in the emerging understanding of the processes which produce overdeepening.

Glaciologists performed a detailed radar survey of Antarctica's Gamburtsev Mountains during the International Polar Year, allowing both the overlying glacial ice thickness and the elevation of the bedrock below to be found. The survey shows overdeepening in the valley floors of up to 432 metres (1,417 ft) while the valleys exhibit steep side troughs. The figure to the left shows the three major regions of overdeepening, of 3 kilometres (2 mi), 6 kilometres (4 mi), and 16 kilometres (10 mi) in length. Portions of this profile will be used to illustrate the formation of overdeepened valleys.

=== Headwall zone ===
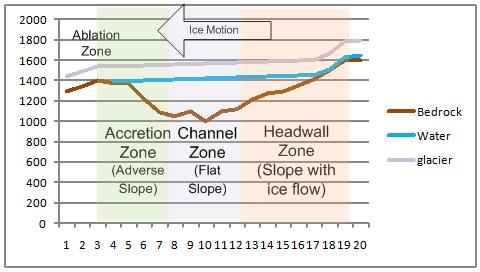
The major zones associated with an overdeepened stretch of a glacier

The upglacier side of an overdeepening is referred to as the headwall, while the downglacier side is referred to as an adverse slope. Water flowing down the headwall gains energy, which melts the surrounding ice, creating channels. As the water passes through the bottom, it continues to drop in temperature; since it is highly pressurized at this point, the melting temperature is suppressed and the water becomes supercooled as it melts surrounding ice. The flowing water transports sediment and locally erodes the bedrock.

Surface water drains via moulins to a subglacial system of conduits which allow flow into cavities in the ice. As the flow increases the head loss in the conduits increases, resulting in increasing water levels and correspondingly higher hydraulic pressure at the headwall of the glacier. As the conduits pressurize, they pressurize the cavities and the porous basal till. The pressurization backs water up within the glacier and the increased pressure at the bed, reduces the pressure the ice exerts against the bed (referred to as the effective pressure at the bed). Since friction with the bed is proportional to the effective pressure at the bed, this pressurization promotes basal motion of the glacier.

Erosion is greatest along the headwall. This is attributed to the seasonal entry of water in those areas via moulins, resulting in varying but periodically high pressures, high flow rates, and large temperature variations. This variation is thought to contribute to quarrying of blocks from the headwall combined with the erosive powers of rapidly moving debris streams entrained in flowing water.

=== Channeled zone ===
Glacier surface melt waters tend to migrate to the base of the ice sheet. Once there the water lubricates the interface between the ice and the bedrock. The hydraulic pressure of the water becomes significant – it is driven by surface slope of the overlying ice and by the bed topography. The hydraulic pressure offsets part of the weight of the glacier (the lower density ice tends to be displaced by water). Both effects enhance basal ice motion. Ice motion data reveal substantial increases in ice velocity during periods when meltwater is present (i.e., the summer( when compared to the winter background values. The glacier does not move uniformly, but rather shows changing patterns of motion as the season progresses, which result from the seasonal evolution of the subglacial drainage system. The largest glacial movements were observed during periods of transition, as increasing water was released into the glacier.

Variable water inflow increase the ice flow rate. Observations show that subglacial water drains either through channels at low pressure or through interconnected cavities at high pressure. Above a critical rate of water flow, channelization and glacier deceleration results. Higher rates of steady water flow actually suppress glacial movement. Episodic increases in water input such as those produced by strong diurnal melt cycles result in temporary water pressure excursions. Such spikes produce ice acceleration. Similarly, rain and surface lake drainage events will cause movement.

Analytic glacial erosion models suggest that ice flows passing through constrained spaces such as mountain passes produced enhanced erosion beneath thicker, faster ice flows, which deepens the channel below areas both upstream and downstream. The underlying physical phenomena is that erosion increases with the rate of ice discharge. Although this simplifies complex relationships among time-varying climates, ice sheet behaviors and bed characteristics, it is based on the general recognition that enhanced ice discharges typically increase the erosion rate. This is because the basal sliding rate and the erosion rate are interrelated and driven by the same variables: the ice thickness, the underlying bed slope, the overlying glacial slope and the basal temperature. As a result, the modeled fjords are deepest through the narrowest channels (i.e., regions with the highest surrounding highest topography). This corresponds with actual physical observations of fjords.

=== Adverse slope zone ===
As it continues to flow and begins to rise up the adverse slope beneath temperate (or "warm-based") glaciers, the pressure decreases and frazil ice accretes in the basal ice. The sediment load carried by the water will be entrained in the accreted ice. At the point in the glacier where the ice is accreting on the adverse slope near the glacier terminus, ablation of the upper surface ice exceeds (for recently observed glaciers) the rate of accretion at the bottom. The net effect is that for a glacier which retains its overall shape, glacier mass will be transferred by water flow to accrete new ice, by sediment transport into meters thick layers observed in the accretion zone, and by movement of the total ice mass to restore the ice lost to ablation.

The sediment-transport capacity and sediment load in subglacial stream glaciers in which the water is not supercooled and for a glacier far into the supercooling regime vary significantly. When a moraine or moraine shoal (bedrock) has developed, the overdeepening terminates in a growing sediment-floored feature. When there is a significant increase in the elevation on the adverse slope, ice grows from supercooling of streams flowing up the overly steep face of the moraine shoal causes transport capacity to drop below load delivered, producing deposition to fill the adverse face of the overdeepening back towards the supercooling threshold. When the flow is able to remove all the sediment delivered but not able to erode bedrock as rapidly as the upstream glacier erodes bedrock in the overdeepened area, then the ice forms on bedrock, and subglacial erosion lowers the glacier bed in the overdeepened region while leaving a bedrock sill.

=== Subglacial ice lens formation ===
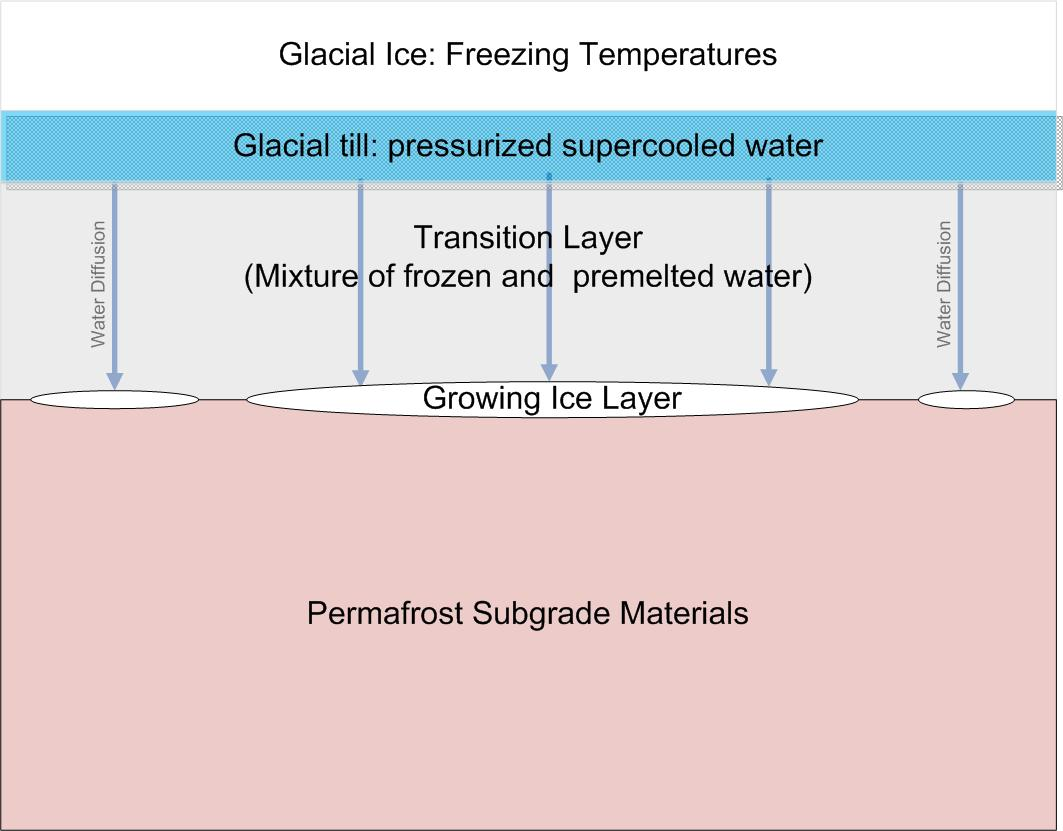
Ice lens growing within glacial till and within bedrock beneath glacial ice

Subglacial erosion is accelerated by subglacial ice lens formation, which contributes to the overdeepening process.

Bands of sediment or glacial till have been observed below Antarctic ice sheets; these are believed to result from ice lenses forming in the debris and in the bedrock. In the faster flowing glacial regions, the ice sheet is sliding over water saturated sediments (glacial till) or actually being floated upon a layer of water. The till and water served to reduce friction between the base of the ice sheet and the bedrock. These subglacial waters come from surface water which seasonally drains from melting at the surface, as well as from ice-sheet base melting.

Ice lens growth within the bedrock below the glacier is projected during the summer months when there is ample water at the base of the glacier. Ice lenses will form within the bedrock, accumulating until the rock is sufficiently weakened that it shears or spalls off. Layers of rock along the interface between glaciers and the bedrock are freed, producing much of the sediments in these basal regions of glaciers. Since the rate of glacier movement is dependent upon the characteristics of this basal ice, research is ongoing to better quantify the phenomena.

== Examples of overdeepening ==
=== Norwegian fjord lakes ===
Norwegian fjord lakes provide an excellent illustration of overdeepening; all of the lake bottoms in the following list of the nine deepest fjord lakes in Norway lie below sea level, even though the lakes are freshwater lakes.

No.	Name	Depth (m)	Surface elevation above sea level (m)	Depth below sea level (m)
1	Hornindalsvatnet	514 metres (1,686 ft)	53 metres (174 ft)	−460 metres (−1,510 ft)
2	Salsvatnet	482 metres (1,581 ft)	16 metres (52 ft)	−466 metres (−1,529 ft)
3	Lake Tinn	460 metres (1,510 ft)	190 metres (620 ft)	−270 metres (−890 ft)
4	Mjøsa	444 metres (1,457 ft)	121 metres (397 ft)	−323 metres (−1,060 ft)
5	Fyresvatn	377 metres (1,237 ft)	279 metres (915 ft)	−98 metres (−322 ft)
6	Suldalsvatnet	376 metres (1,234 ft)	68 metres (223 ft)	−308 metres (−1,010 ft)
7	Bandak	325 metres (1,066 ft)	72 metres (236 ft)	−253 metres (−830 ft)
8	Lundevatn	314 metres (1,030 ft)	49 metres (161 ft)	−265 metres (−869 ft)
9	Storsjøen (in Rendalen)	309 metres (1,014 ft)	259 metres (850 ft)	−50 metres (−160 ft)

== Alternate use of the term "overdeepening" ==
Geologists apply the term overdeepening to one phenomenon other than glacial overdeepening – the dramatic river valley downcutting which can occur when the sea into which it discharges dries out. In what is referred to as the Messinian salinity crisis the Mediterranean Sea basin was geologically separate from the Atlantic Ocean. Evaporation dropped the sea level by over 1000 meters at the mouth of the Rhone River and 2,500 meters at the mouth of the Nile River, resulting in overdeepening of these valleys. The Nile cut its bed down to several hundred feet below sea level far upstream at Aswan, and 8,000 feet (2,500 m) below sea level just north of Cairo.
