= Zentner (surname) =

Zentner is a surname. Notable people with the surname include:

- Alexi Zentner (born 1973), Canadian novelist
- Ellen Zentner, American economist
- Eric Zentner (1981–2011), American fashion model
- Jorge Zentner (born 1953), Argentine comic writer
- Nick Zentner (born 1962), American geologist
- Robin Zentner (born 1994), German football player
- Si Zentner (1917–2000), American trombonist
- Ty Zentner (born 1998), American football player
