= Gold commissioner =

Gold commissioner was an important regional administrative post in the colonies of the British Empire where extensive gold prospecting took place, including in Canada (Colony of British Columbia), Australia (New South Wales, Victoria, Queensland and Western Australia), New Zealand and in South Africa. The key responsibilities of gold commissioners were to uphold the law, provide access to the gold fields, issue mining licences, and register gold claims. Such a role was required due to the lawlessness that often followed gold rushes.

== British Columbia ==
In the Colony of British Columbia during the 1860s, Governor Douglas had three priorities to protect the two colonies he governed: to protect the boundaries, to uphold law and order, and to provide access to the gold fields. In 1859, the Pig War together with McGowan's War the previous year, underlined concerns that American settlers might challenge the British jurisdictions. After the native population in the Washington Territory was devastated and the annexed land was opened to colonization, its colonist population grew rapidly to more than 11,000. General William Harney, after meeting with Douglas, reported to Washington that the population of the colony was largely American with few British and that it would soon be a commercial necessity for the colonists to yield Vancouver Island to the U.S. government. In these circumstances, Douglas enhanced the limited military capability of the Royal Engineers and developed the office of gold commissioner buttressed by the periodic visits of a traveling judge.

The ten commissioners were appointed to specific geographic jurisdictions. Their primary role was to issue mining licences and register gold claims. The commissioners also acted as agents of everyday authority. They settled mining disputes, collected government revenues, oversaw land claims, served as electoral officers, and dealt with the natives. They displayed the British flag. They acted as a receiver-cashier for gold, which was held until the Gold Escort could deliver it to the capital. A gold commissioner's powers and duties also encompassed the duties of government agent, Indian agent, magistrate, mines commissioner, surveyor, sheriff, and coroner. The powers of a gold commissioner within his designated jurisdiction were second only to the governor. The position remained as a fixture in the new province when the colony joined Canada in 1871, although by the end of World War I nearly all gold commissioner positions had been devolved to separate offices, with the bulk of the office's power and legacy inherited by the government agent, who typically was also Indian agent as well as mines commissioner, which was a post associated with each of the mining districts. The office of chief gold commissioner continued, however, and still functions today as the administrator and chief regulatory authority for the Mineral Tenure Act, Coal Act and associated acts dealing with the holding and maintenance of mineral and coal tenure (claims and leases) within British Columbia.

The current chief gold commissioner (April 28, 2023) of British Columbia is Donna Myketa. Previous BC chief gold commissioners include Mark Messmer, May Mah-Paulson, Edmund J. Collazzi, Anne Currie, Gary Townsend, Laurel Nash, Jody Shimkus, Lisa Nye, William Phelan, Patrick O’Rourke, Gerald German, Denis Lieutard, John Clancy, M.R. Rutherford, E.J. Bowles, R.H. McCrimmon, K.B. Blakey, P.J. Mulcahy, Noel Wallinger, Robert J. Steenson, Peter O'Reilly, and Chartres Brew, the first to hold the office.

== Other sources ==
- McGowan's War, Donald J. Hauka, New Star Books, Vancouver (2000) ISBN 1-55420-001-6
- British Columbia Chronicle,: Gold & Colonists, Helen and G.P.V. Akrigg, Discovery Press, Vancouver (1977) ISBN 0-919624-03-0
