= Alonzo Pearl Troth =

American teacher and geologist (1872–1945)

- Born: September 19, 1872; Spencer, Indiana, US
- Died: May 19, 1945 (aged 72); Spokane, Washington
- Occupation: High school teacher
- Known for: (Cataclysmic) Flood Theory
- Title: Life-time member NWSA
- Board member of: Leadership Inland Empire Teachers Association

Academic background
- Education: A.B. degree University of Indiana in 1897

Academic work
- Discipline: Zoology, Head of the Natural Science Department
- Sub-discipline: Geology of the Pacific Northwest
- Institutions: Lewis and Clark High School
- Influenced: Thomas Large

Alonzo Pearl Troth (September 19, 1872 – May 19, 1945) was a Zoology high school teacher and head of the natural science department at Lewis and Clark High School, Spokane, Washington, attributed by Joseph G. McMacken, head of the physical science department, to have been the first to come with an (unpublished) “Flood Theory” as the origin of the Channeled Scablands.

== Northwest Scientific Association (NWSA) ==
Troth was one of the founders of the NWSA. He was later honored a NWSA life-time membership.

== Death ==
Troth died in Spokane on 19 May 1945. The Spokane Daily Chronicle praised on its front page “Alonzo Troth, among a host of former teachers, many of them dead now, whose influence was incalculable.”

== Influences ==
Thomas Large studied with Troth in the same university class and was a colleague teacher at Lewis and Clark and a mutual friend of J Harlen Bretz.

However, Bretz stands by the notion that he got his Flood Theory from looking at one of the first topographic maps of the Quincy Basin, 1909, thus not from Troth. The idea of cataclysmic flooding causing the scablands was certainly a matter of informal discussion before 1923, when Bretz was the first to publish on it.
