= Thomas Large =

American geologist and teacher (1871–1951)

- Born: June 20, 1871; Indiana, US
- Died: March 17, 1951 (aged 79); Spokane, Washington, US
- Occupations: High school teacher, professor
- Known for: (Cataclysmic) Flood Theory
- Title: President NWSA 1934

Academic background
- Education: BS at University of Indiana in 1897, MS at University of Chicago in 1917-1941
- Influences: Alonzo Pearl Troth

Academic work
- Discipline: Natural science, Geology,
- Sub-discipline: Geology of the Pacific Northwest
- Institutions: Lewis and Clark High School
- Influenced: Joseph Pardee, J Harlen Bretz

Thomas Large (June 20, 1871 – March 17, 1951) was a self-taught geologist and natural science high school teacher at Lewis and Clark High School in Spokane, Washington. Large was president (1934) and one of the founders of the Northwest Scientific Society. Besides teaching, Large aided geological expeditions with local logistical arrangements for geologists Joseph Pardee and J Harlen Bretz.

Large became a teacher and professor at the age of 50.

Thomas Large is credited with inviting Bretz, Joseph Pardee and other academics to Spokane in 1922 to investigate what local scientists had not been able to figure out. He wrote letters to universities with questions before that. Pardee had been in the area 12 years before.

Large reported in 1922 his own observations regarding glaciations and possible floods in Science. He also reported on the 6 months of work by Paradee. Large published on the Glacial Lake Spokane in several papers.

== Northwest Scientific Association (NWSA) ==
Large encouraged funding to erect the NWSA. He promoted the NWSA together with his old university classmate Alonzo Pearl Troth. Large was elected president in 1934 by the organization's membership, which was overwhelmingly academics. Large served the NWSA as a publications committee member (1927), councilor (1927–1933), journal editorial board member (1930), trustee (1932), vice president (1933), and journal editor in chief (1934–1937).

== Death ==
Thomas Large died after three months in a hospital in Spokane. The Spokane Daily Chronicle frontpage reported:

DEATH CLAIMS THOMAS LARGE - Thomas Large, one of Spokane’s outstanding scientists and educators, died today in a hospital where he had been for three months. He is credited with the first paper on the theory that the Spokane valley was once a huge lake that burst its banks, near what is now Pine Creek and overflowed to the southwest. The University of Chicago sent Dr. Harlan Bretz here to investigate Large’s theory and the famous scientist confirmed it.

In 1945, Large is also mentioned in the death notice of Troth in the Spokane Daily Chronicle.
