= Wash margin =

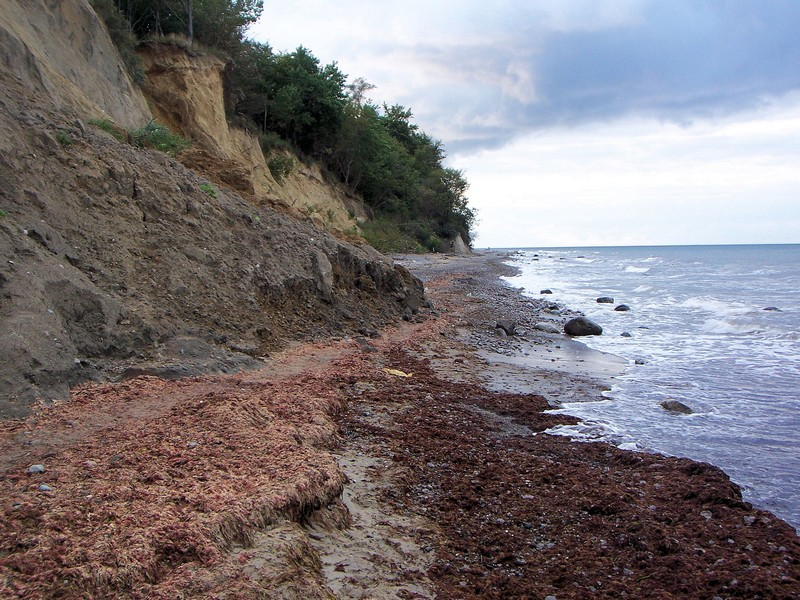
Two successive wash margins (centre and below right) comprising seaweed and eelgrass.

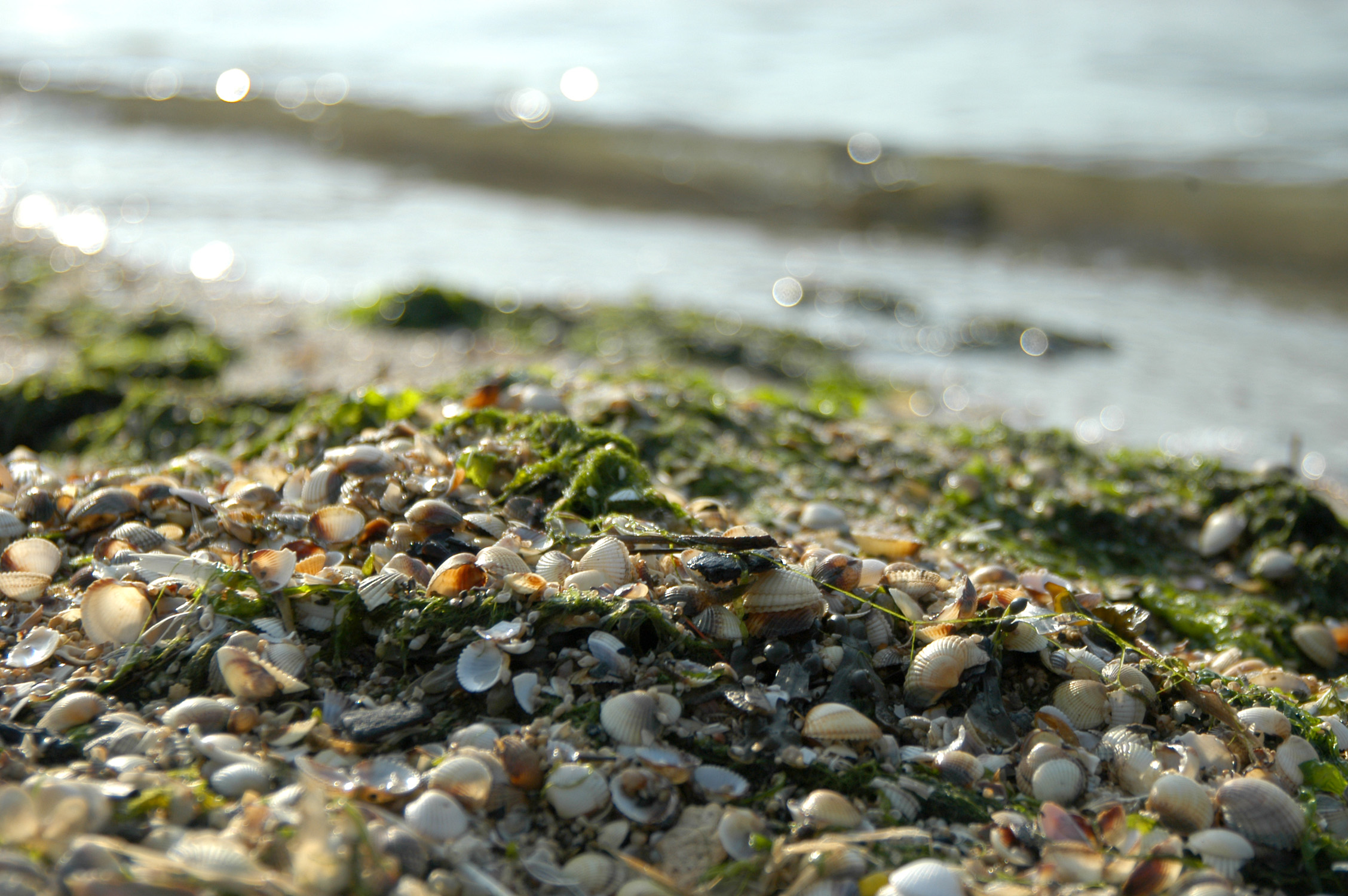
Close-up of wash margin on the beach at Cuxhaven

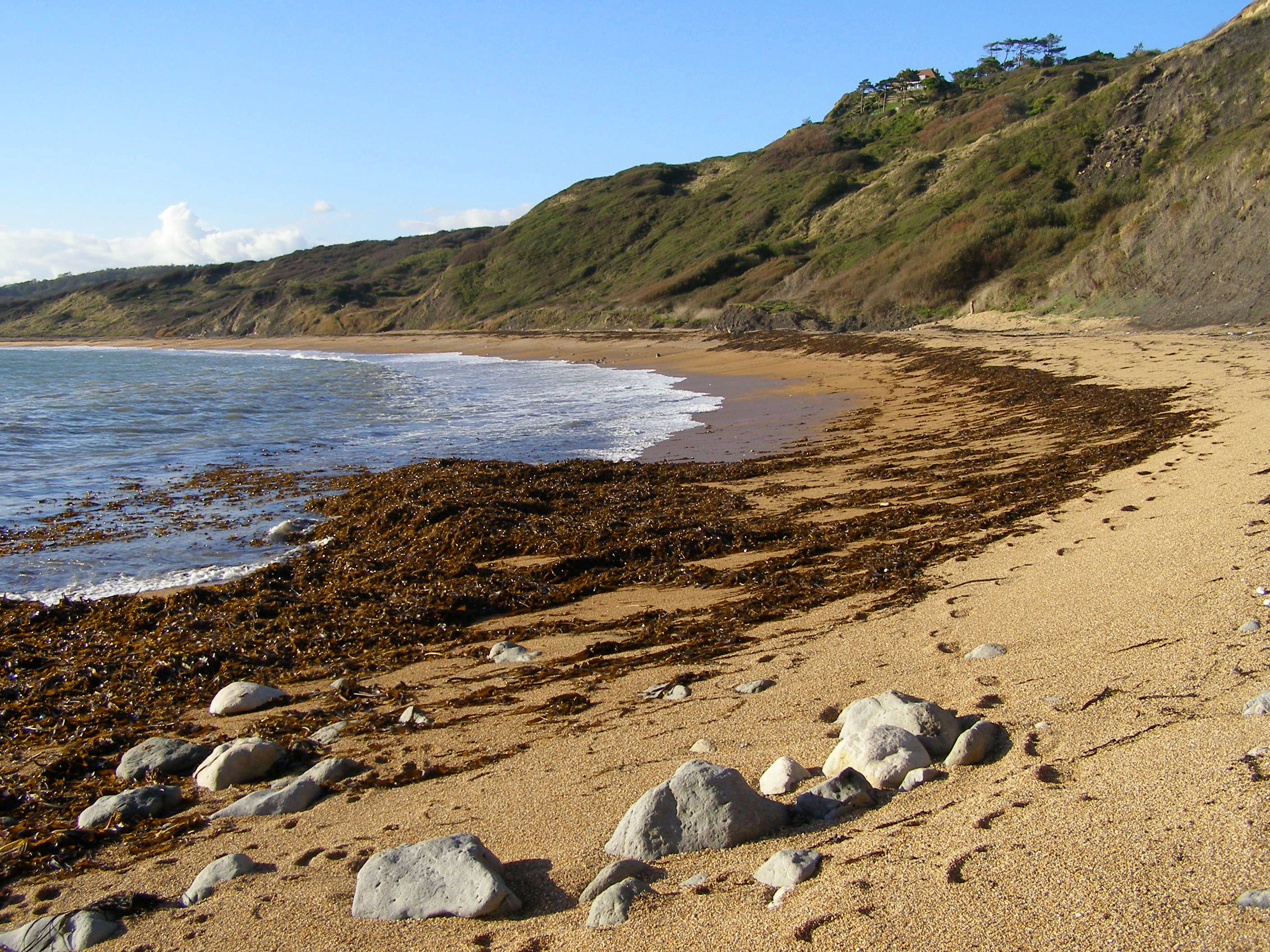
The strandline at Ringstead Beach, Dorset, United Kingdom

A drift line or wrack line, also known as a wash margin or wash fringe (German: Spülsaum) is an area of the shore on which material is deposited or washed up. It often runs along the margin of a waterbody and there can be several bands due to variations in water levels. As a result of the richness of nutrients that occur in such wash fringes, ruderal species frequently occur here, that, for example, on the Baltic Sea coast consist of grassleaf orache and sea kale.

== See also ==
- High water mark
- Intertidal zone

== Literature ==
- Leser, Hartmut, ed. (2005). Wörterbuch Allgemeine Geographie, 13th ed., Deutsche Taschenbuch Verlag, Munich, ISBN 978-3-423-03422-7.
