= Richard Foster Flint =

American geologist (1902–1976)

Richard Foster Flint (March 1, 1902 - June 6, 1976) was an American geologist.

== Biography ==
He was born in Chicago on March 1, 1902.

Flint graduated from the University of Chicago in 1922 and earned his Ph.D. in geology also at the University of Chicago in 1925. He then joined Yale as a member of the faculty, becoming a full professor in 1945.

Flint was recognized for his leadership role in Quaternary period geology with extensive work on effects of glaciations in northeastern America.

He also performed research in Washington State to understand the last ice age’s impact on the Northwest, gaining some notoriety for his opposition to the Missoula Floods hypothesis, which was posed by J Harlen Bretz. He presented a detailed and thoughtful argument against the possibility of catastrophic floods; a position which has subsequently fallen into disfavor based on a wide collection of evidence.

He died on June 6, 1976, in New Haven, Connecticut.

== Major publications include ==
- Outlines of Physical Geology, 1941
- Introduction to Geology, 1962
- Radiocarbon measurements, 1967
- Glacial Geology and the Pleistocene Epoch (Glacial and Pleistocene Geology), 1957
- Glacial and Quaternary Geology, 1971

== Honors ==
- In 1972 he was awarded the Prestwich Medal, a medal awarded by the Geological Society of London, for significant contributions in the science of Geology.
