= Little Bitterroot River =

Location
- Country: United States
- State: Montana

Physical characteristics
- Source: Forest Road 5344 & FR 538 (Griffin Creek Road) above Little Bitterroot Lake.
  - coordinates: 48.20742°N 114.73808°W
  - elevation: 5,217 feet (1,590 m)
- Mouth: Flathead River
  - coordinates: 47.494816°N 114.330974°W
  - elevation: 2,567 feet (782 m) near Sloan Bridge over the Flathead River.
- Length: 65 km (40 mi)
- Basin size: 600 mi^{2} (1,600 km^{2})
- Width
  - minimum: 1 mile (1.6 km)
  - maximum: 8 miles (13 km)
- Depth
  - average: 100 feet (30 m)

Basin features
- Tributaries
  - left: Hot Springs Creek
  - right: Sullivan Creek

Little Bitterroot River is in northwestern Montana. It in the mountains west of Kalispell north of Marion or about 25 miles (40 km) west-northwest of Flathead Lake. It flows south-southeastward for 65 miles (105 km) to the Flathead River, which goes into the Clark Fork of the Columbia. The basin covers about 600 square miles (1,600 km^{2}), or about 385,000 acres (156,000 ha). The upper basin as mountainous area with interior plains, from 1 to 8 miles (1.6 to 12.9 km) wide and about 100 square miles (260 km^{2}) in extent. The plain area traversed by the 40 miles (64 km) its length. The Little Bitterroot valley, is an arm of the Lake Missoula glacial plain south of Flathead Lake.

== Course ==
The Little Bitterroot consists of three distinct reaches. The largest and most northerly is a mountainous or hilly area, shaped by the wearing away of masses of bedrock. The second area is an elongated plains, within the trough between the mountains. The plains are from sediments on the floor of Lake Missoula during the glacial epoch. The last part is bottom lands, created by recent erosion of the old lake plain.

=== Mountain reach ===
The mountainous or hill country, reaches from the headwaters above U.S. 2 to north of Lone Pine. The river is surrounded by hills rather than mountains. The hills and mountains on the east side of the valley are nearly treeless, but those on the west side apparently receive more rain and snow, for they support a forest of large trees. The sides of the mountains are marked with horizontal lines that show the levels at which the water stood when Lake Missoula extended over this region. The Little Bitterroot begins at pass above Marion on U.S. 2 where Forest Road (FR) 5344 and FR 538 or Griffin Creek Road. From this pass at 5,217 feet (1,590 m) above sea level (asl), the basin collects into Little Bitterroot Lake, 3,907 feet (1,191 m) asl. The south end of the lake drains into the Little Bitterroot River, flowing southward. For a few miles, the river shares its valley with U.S. 2. Here, Sickler Creek joins the Little Bitterroot, draining the basin of Lake Rogers to the east. Highway 2 continues west over a shallow pass into the McGregor Lake valley and the Little Bitterroot continues south, entering a narrow canyon and Hidden Lakes. Before reaching Hidden Lake, the river drops over a 2 miles (3.2 km) rapidly losing 117 feet (36 m) in elevation, reaching the lake which stands at 2,627 feet (801 m) asl. Through the Hidden Lake area, the canyons are flat bottom, evidence of glacial ice scouring this area. As the canyon opens into a wide flat bottom valley, Tamarack Creek enters from the west, just before reaching Hubbart Reservoir.

== See also ==
- List of rivers of Montana
- Montana Stream Access Law
