= High water mark =

Highest level of a body of water

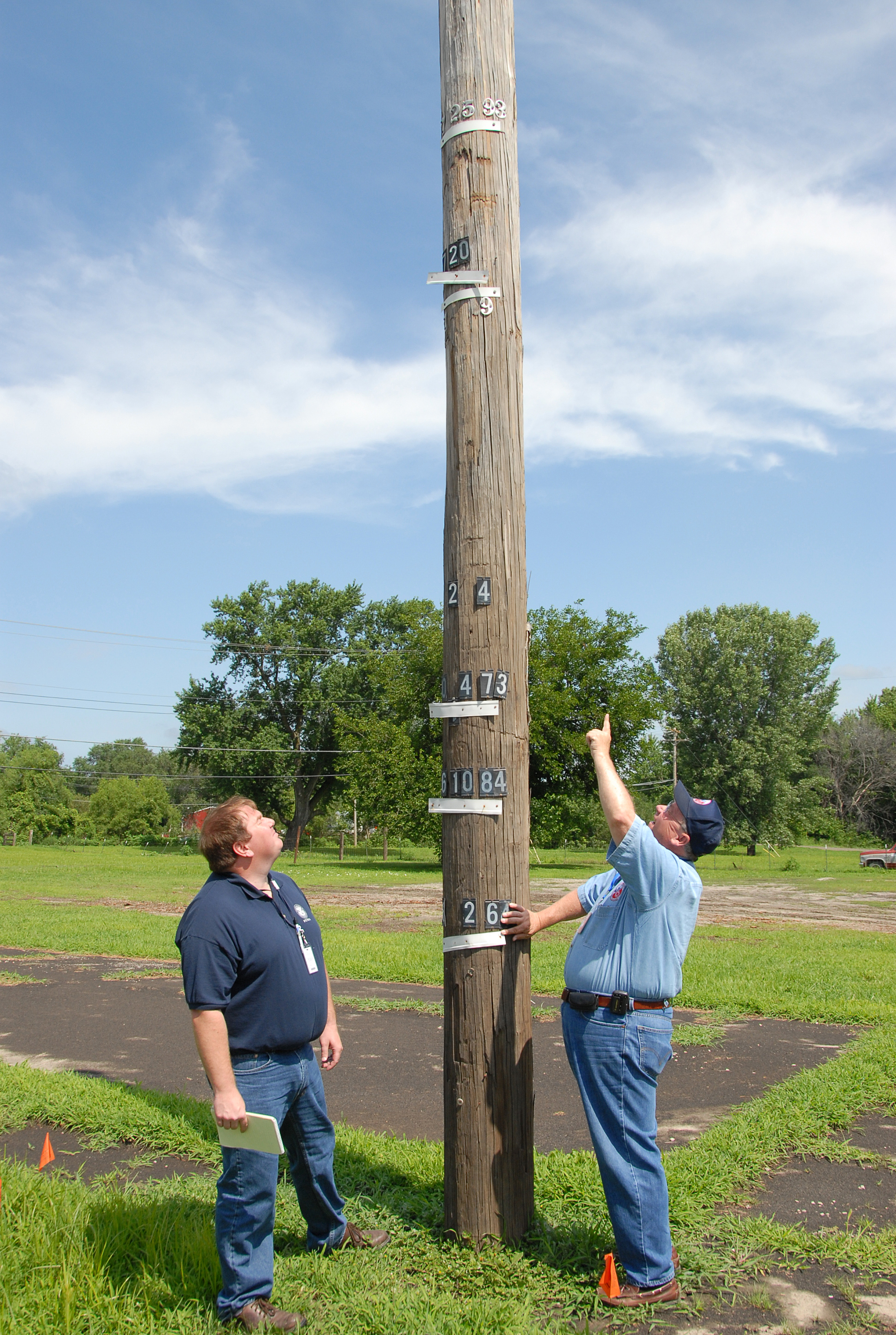
Sign indicating high water marks of different floods in Missouri, U.S.

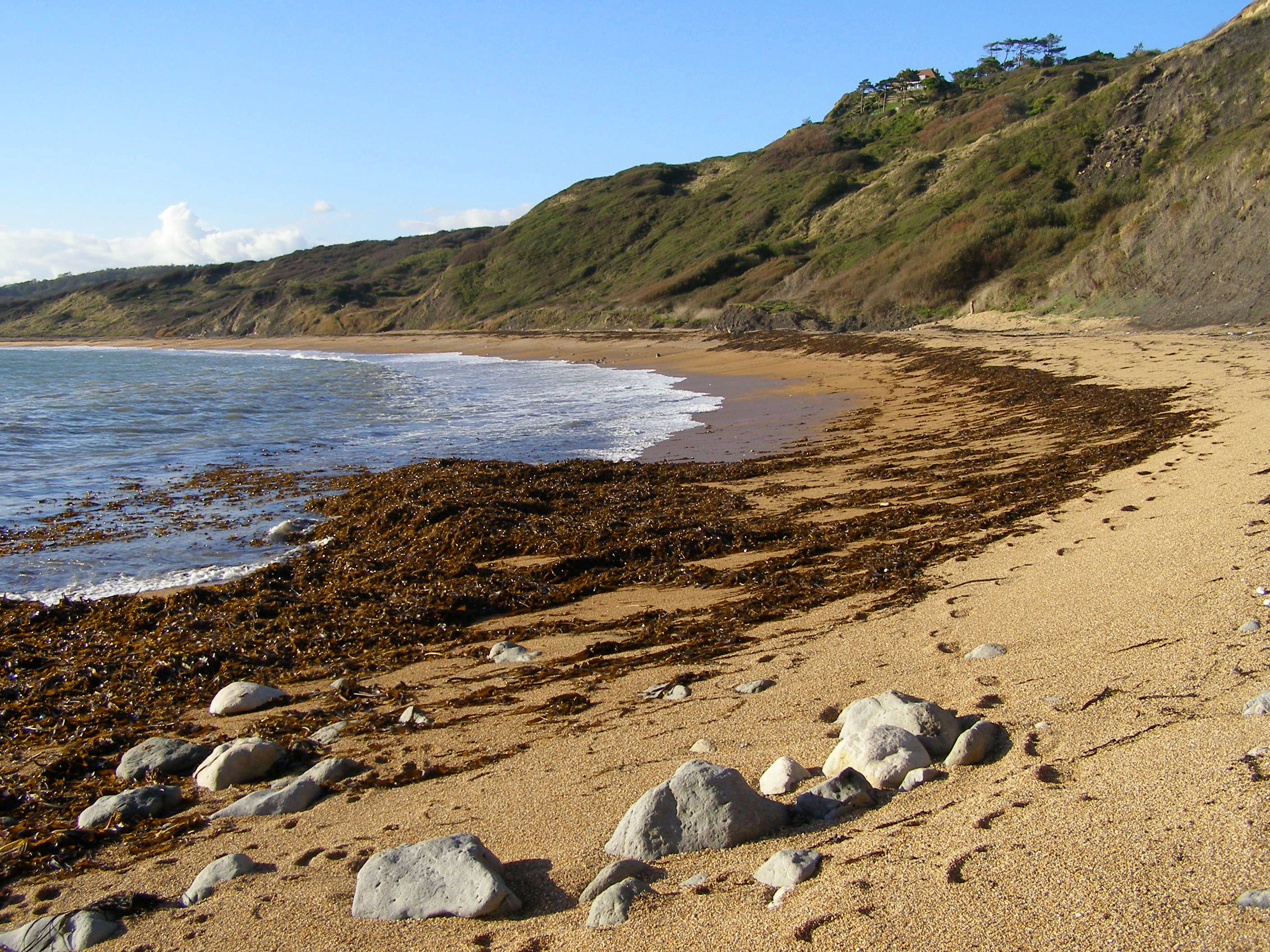
The strandline at Ringstead Beach, Dorset, UK

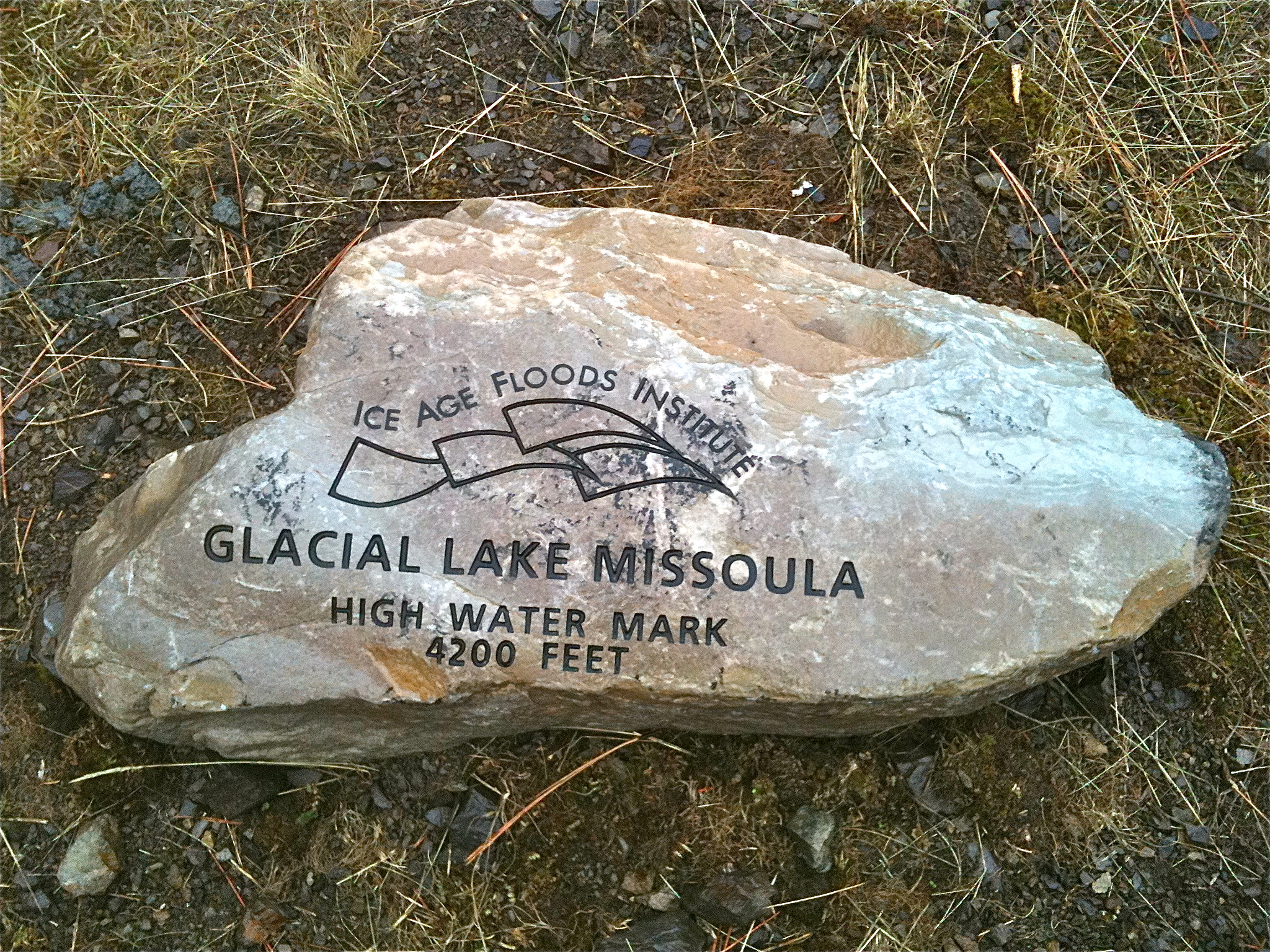
High water mark memorial at Lake Missoula, Montana, U.S.

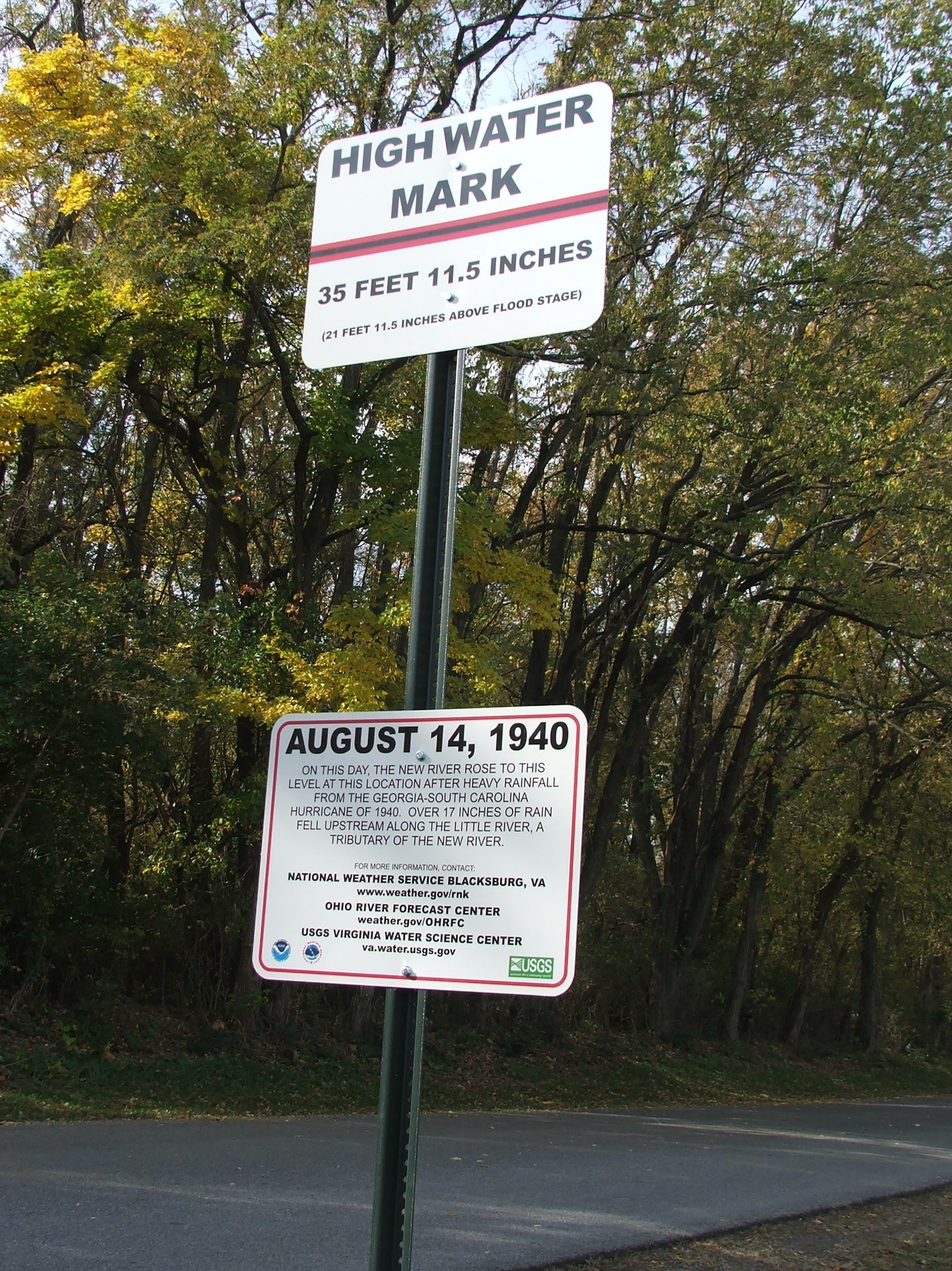
High water mark sign in Bisset Park, Virginia, U.S.

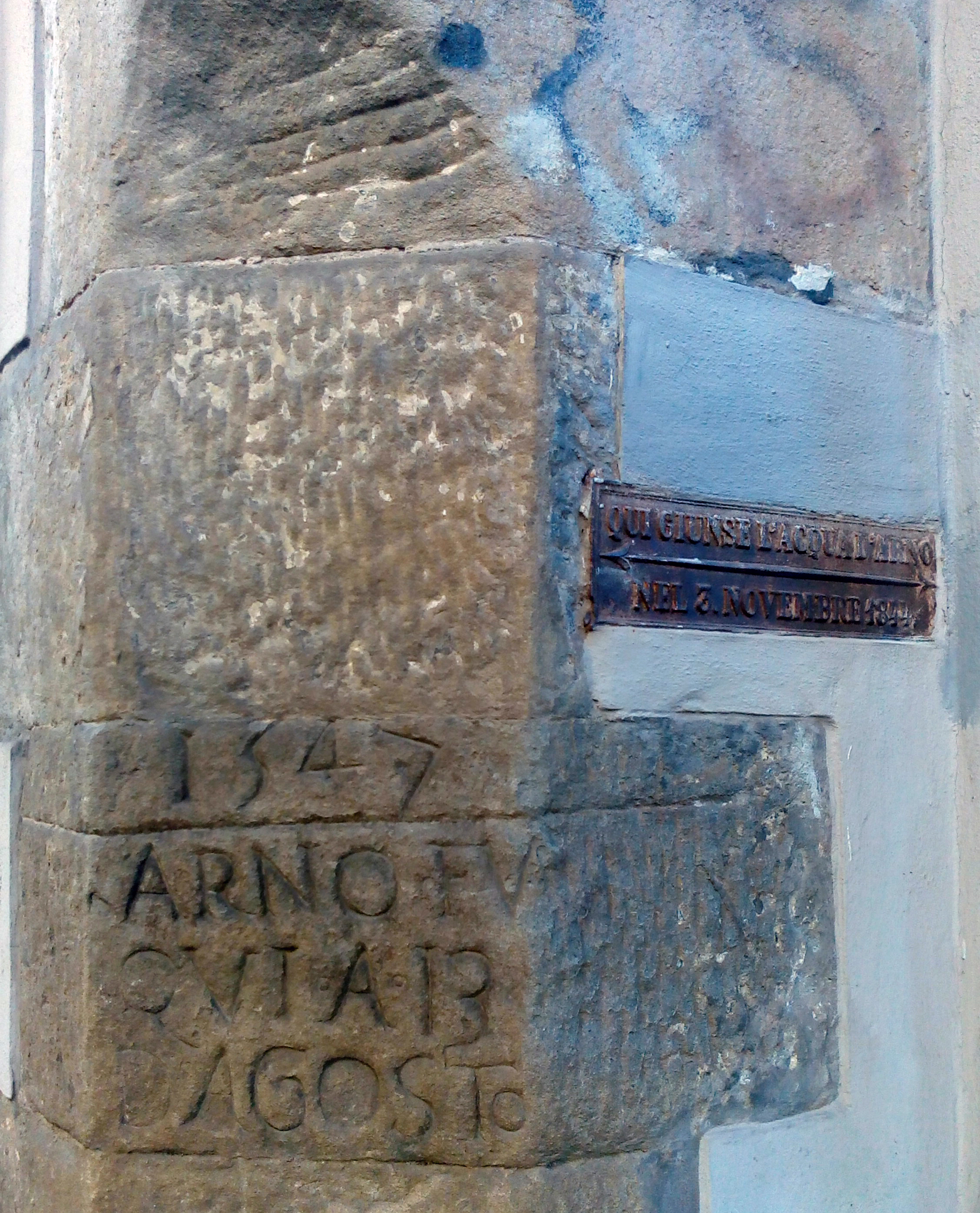
High water marks of Arno river (Florence) floods on August 13, 1547 (left) and November 3, 1844 (metal plate on the right). Photographed in Via delle Casine.

A high water mark is a point that represents the maximum rise of a body of water over land. Such a mark is often the result of a flood, but high water marks may reflect an all-time high, an annual high (highest level to which water rose that year) or the high point for some other division of time. Knowledge of the high water mark for an area is useful in managing the development of that area, particularly in making preparations for flood surges. High water marks from floods have been measured for planning purposes since at least as far back as the civilizations of ancient Egypt. It is a common practice to create a physical marker indicating one or more of the highest water marks for an area, usually with a line at the level to which the water rose, and a notation of the date on which this high water mark was set. This may be a free-standing flood level sign or other marker, or it may be affixed to a building or other structure that was standing at the time of the flood that set the mark.

A high water mark is not necessarily an actual physical mark, but it is possible for water rising to a high point to leave a lasting physical impression such as floodwater staining. A landscape marking left by the high water mark of ordinary tidal action may be called a strandline and is typically composed of debris left by high tide. The area at the top of a beach where debris is deposited is an example of this phenomenon. Where there are tides, this line is formed by the highest position of the tide, and moves up and down the beach on a fortnightly cycle. The debris is chiefly composed of rotting seaweed, but can also include a large amount of litter, either from ships at sea or from sewage outflows.

== Ecological significance ==
The strandline is an important habitat for a variety of animals. In parts of the United Kingdom, sandhoppers such as Talitrus saltator and the seaweed fly Coelopa frigida are abundant in the rotting seaweed, and these invertebrates provide food for shore birds such as the rock pipit, turnstone and pied wagtail, and mammals such as brown hares, foxes, voles and mice.

== Legal significance ==
One kind of high water mark is the ordinary high water mark or average high water mark, the high water mark that can be expected to be produced by a body of water in non-flood conditions. The ordinary high water mark may have legal significance and is often used to demarcate property boundaries. The ordinary high water mark has also been used for other legal demarcations. For example, a 1651 analysis of laws passed by the English Parliament notes that for persons granted the title Admiral of the English Seas, "the Admirals power extended even to the high water mark, and into the main streams".

In the United States, the high water mark is also significant because the United States Constitution gives Congress the authority to legislate for waterways, and the high water mark is used to determine the geographic extent of that authority. Federal regulations (33 CFR 328.3(e)) define the "ordinary high water mark" (OHWM) as "that line on the shore established by the fluctuations of water and indicated by physical characteristics such as a clear, natural line impressed on the bank, shelving, changes in the character of soil, destruction of terrestrial vegetation, the presence of litter and debris, or other appropriate means that consider the characteristics of the surrounding areas." For the purposes of Section 404 of the Clean Water Act, the OHWM defines the lateral limits of federal jurisdiction over non-tidal water bodies in the absence of adjacent wetlands. For the purposes of Sections 9 and 10 of the Rivers and Harbors Act of 1899, the OHWM defines the lateral limits of federal jurisdiction over traditional navigable waters of the US. The OHWM is used by the United States Army Corps of Engineers, the United States Environmental Protection Agency, and other federal agencies to determine the geographical extent of their regulatory programs. Likewise, many states use similar definitions of the OHWM for the purposes of their own regulatory programs.

In 2016, the Court of Appeals of Indiana ruled that land below the OHWM (as defined by common law) along Lake Michigan is held by the state in trust for public use.

== See also ==
- Chart datum
- Mean high water
- Measuring storm surge
- Terrace (geology), benches left by lakes
- Wash margin
