= Joseph Pardee =

American geologist (1871-1960)

Joseph T. Pardee
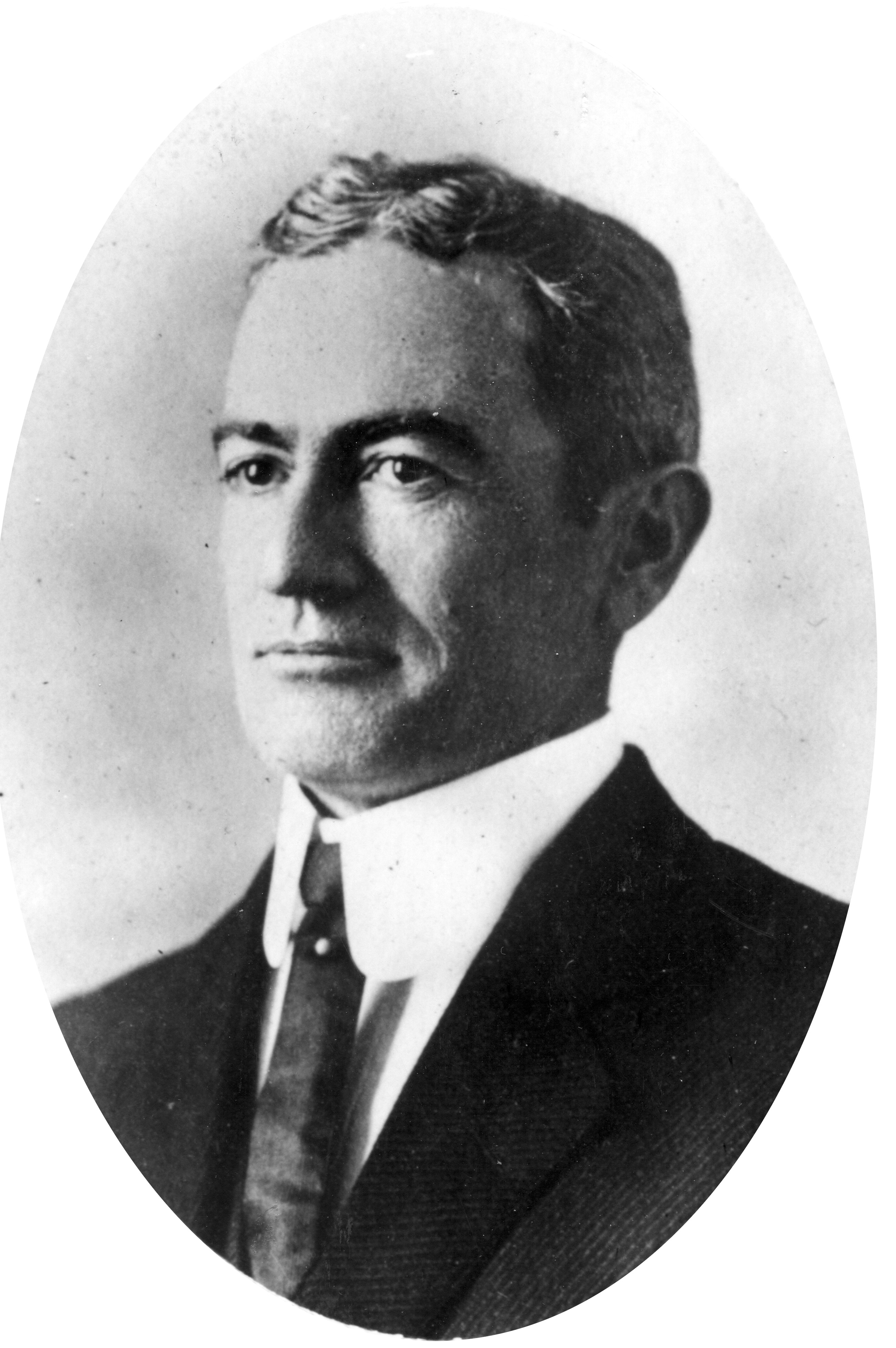
- Joseph Pardee in 1909
- Born: 1871; Salt Lake City, Utah, United States
- Died: 1960 (aged 88–89)
- Education: Presbyterian College; University of California
- Scientific career
- Fields: Geologist

Joseph Thomas Pardee (May 30, 1871, in Salt Lake City, Utah-March 2, 1960, in Philipsburg, Montana) was a U.S. geologist who worked for the U.S. Geological Survey, and contributed to the understanding of the origin of the Channeled Scablands. He discovered the trail of evidence left by Glacial Lake Missoula, a lake created by an ice dam 23 miles (37 km) wide and 0.5 miles (0.8 km) high during the most recent ice age. He discovered that when the dam broke, the water flowed towards the scablands, supporting J Harlen Bretz's theory of the cataclysmic floods.

== Biography ==
Born in Salt Lake City, Joe grew up in a mining family. The family moved to Philipsburg, Montana, when Joe was three, and his father developed the Algonquin mine. Joe's education was at Presbyterian College in Deer Lodge, Montana, and the University of California at Berkeley. After college he opened an assay office and operated a gold and sapphire mine, but a growing interest in geology led him to the USGS. He was appointed to the Survey in 1909 and retired in 1941. Pardee got invited with Bretz by Thomas Large to Spokane in 1922. Large wrote about the 6 months of USGS field work of Pardee that year. Pardee kept fieldnotes during his whole working career.

During 32 years of work, his investigations ranged from glacial deposits to gold deposits, from mine sites to dam sites. Joe Pardee spent most of his career on geology in the northwestern United States, with particular emphasis on Montana. His research in Montana helped to reveal how the Channeled Scablands in the southeastern part of the U.S. state of Washington were created.

== See also ==
- J Harlen Bretz
- Missoula Floods
- Thomas Large
