= Glacial Lake Missoula =

Prehistoric proglacial lake in Western Montana

Lake Missoula
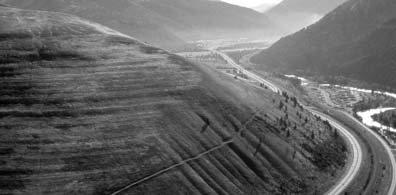
- Wave-cut strandlines cut into the slope at left in photo. These cuts record former high-water lines, or shorelines. Gullies above the highway are the result of modern-day erosion. (NPS Photo)

- Location within the United States Location within Montana
- Location: Western Montana, U.S.
- Coordinates: 46°56′20″N 114°08′37″W
- Lake type: former lake
- Primary inflows: Channeled Scablands
- Primary outflows: Wallula Gap of the Columbia River
- Basin countries: United States
- Max. length: 200 miles (320 km)
- Max. width: 57 miles (92 km)
- Surface area: 2,973 square miles (7,700 km^{2})
- Max. depth: 2,000 feet (610 m)
- Water volume: 500 cubic miles (2,100 km^{3})
- Residence time: N/A due to multiple historic fill / drain events
- Surface elevation: 4,206 feet (1,282 m) AMSL
- References: Bjornstad, Bruce N. (c. 2006). On the trail of the Ice Age floods : a geological field guide to the mid-Columbia basin / Bruce Bjornstad. Sandpoint, Idaho: Keokee Books. p. 4. ISBN 978-1-879628-27-4.

U.S. National Natural Landmark
- Designated: 1966

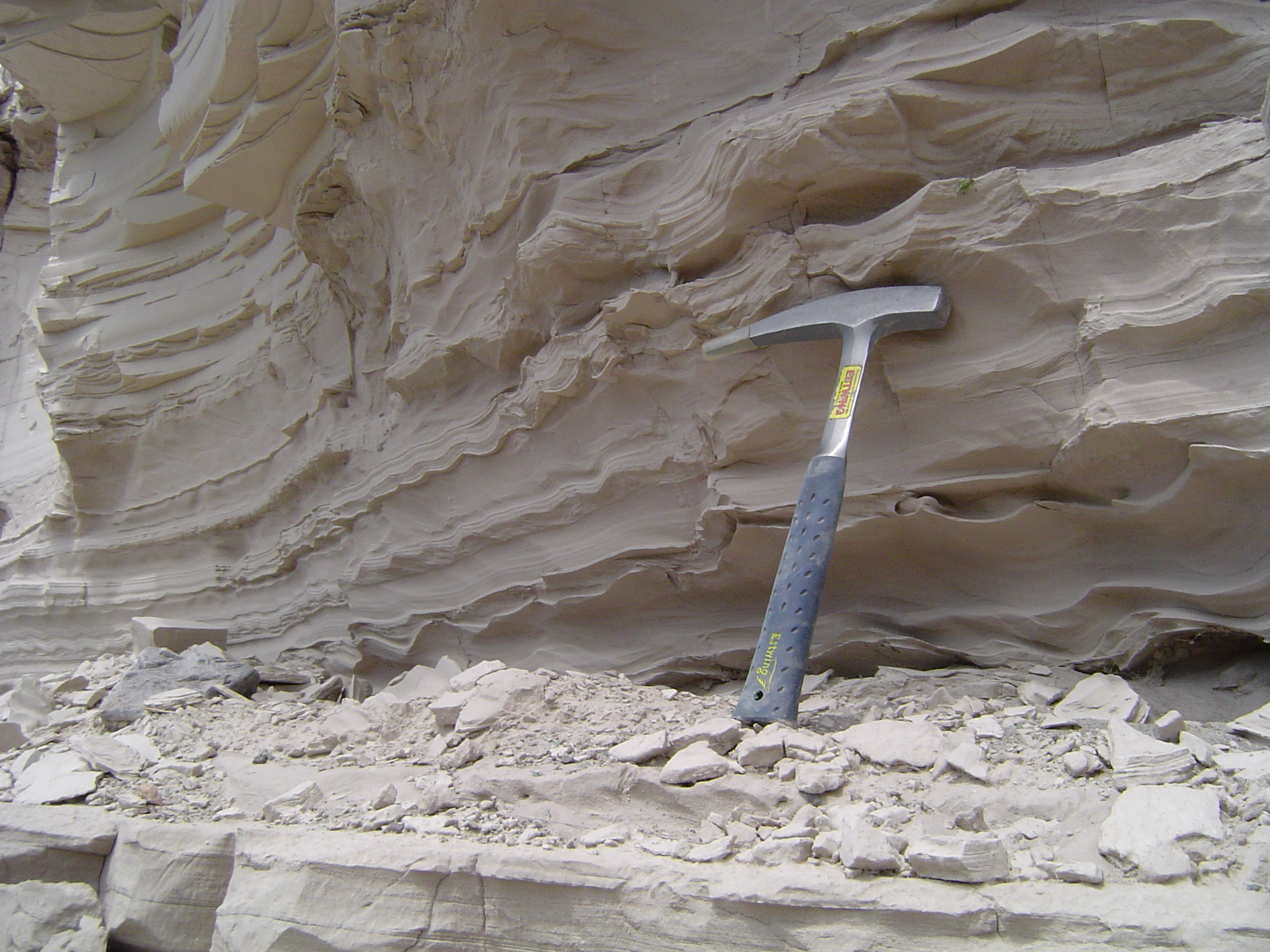
Sediment deposited by the lake with a hammer for scale.

Lake Missoula was a prehistoric proglacial lake in western Montana that existed periodically at the end of the last ice age between 15,000 and 13,000 years ago. The lake measured about 3,000 square miles (7,770 km^{2}) and contained about 500 cubic miles (2,100 km^{3}) of water, half the volume of Lake Michigan.

The Glacial Lake Missoula National Natural Landmark is located about 68 miles (110 km) northwest of Missoula, Montana, at the north end of the Camas Prairie Valley, just east of Montana Highway 382 and Macfarlane Ranch. It was designated as a National Natural Landmark in 1966 because it contains the great ripples (often measuring 25 to 50 feet (8 to 15 m) high and 300 feet (90 m) long) that served as a strong supporting element for J Harlen Bretz's contention that Washington State's Channeled Scablands were formed by repeated cataclysmic floods over only about 2,000 years, rather than through the millions of years of erosion that had been previously assumed.

The lake was the result of an ice dam on the Clark Fork caused by the southern encroachment of a finger of the Cordilleran ice sheet into the Idaho Panhandle (at the present-day location of Clark Fork, Idaho, at the east end of Lake Pend Oreille). The height of the ice dam typically approached 2,000 feet (600 m), flooding the valleys of western Montana approximately 200 miles (320 km) eastward. It was the largest ice-dammed lake known to have occurred.

The periodic rupturing of the ice dam resulted in the Missoula Floods – a series of cataclysmic glacial lake outburst floods (GLOFs) that swept periodically across the area that would become Eastern Washington, northern Idaho and northern Oregon, and down the Columbia River Gorge approximately 40 times during a 2,000-year period at the end of the last ice age. The cumulative effect of the floods was to excavate 50 cubic miles (210 km^{3}) of loess, sediment and basalt from the channeled scablands of eastern Washington and to transport it downstream. These floods are noteworthy for producing canyons and other large geologic features through cataclysms rather than through more typical gradual processes.

In addition, Middle and Early Pleistocene Missoula flood deposits have been documented to comprise parts of the glaciofluvial deposits, informally known as the Hanford formation that are found in parts of the Othello Channels, Columbia River Gorge, Channeled Scabland, Quincy Basin, Pasco Basin, and the Walla Walla Valley. The age of these deposits is demonstrated by the presence of multiple interglacial calcretes interbedded in these glaciofluvial deposits, sequences of sediments with normal and reverse magnetostratigraphy, optically stimulated luminescence dating, and unconformity truncated clastic dikes. Based upon these criteria, Quaternary geologists estimated that the oldest of the Pleistocene Missoula floods happened before 1.5 million years ago. The older Pleistocene glaciofluvial deposits within the Hanford formation are fragmentary in nature because they have been repeatedly eroded and largely removed by subsequent Missoula floods. Because of the fragmentary nature of older glaciofluvial deposits, the exact number of older Missoula floods, which are known as Ancient Cataclysmic Floods, that occurred during the Pleistocene cannot be estimated with any confidence. Although Lake Missoula likely was the source of many of the Ancient Cataclysmic Floods, the fragmentary nature of the older deposits within the Hanford formation makes precise determination of the precise origin of the floods that deposited them very difficult.

== Geology ==
=== Ice dam on the Clark Fork River ===
The Cordilleran ice sheet originating in British Columbia expanded out of the mountains and southward. A tongue of ice pushed down the Purcell Valley or Purcell Trench, reaching south beyond Lake Pend Oreille. This Purcell Lobe blocked the natural outlet of the Clark Fork River. Including its tributaries, Clark Fork represented western Montana's most important river system. The ice mass that effectively dammed Clark Fork was about 2,000 feet (600 m) deep and extended between 10 and 30 miles (16 and 48 km). The ice dam reached east up the Clark's Fork to Cabinet, Montana, and southward around the mountain to Bayview, Idaho on the south tip of Lake Pend Oreille in Farragut State Park. Here, the ice sheet stood over 2,000 feet (600 m) tall and 25 miles (40 km) south of Lake Missoula.

=== Lake levels ===
The Clark Fork's drainage is a network of valleys among high mountain ranges. Lake Missoula formed through this region of western Montana. It is named for the city of Missoula in the upper reaches of the Clark Fork watershed. The mountains surrounding the city show the strandlines from the lake nearly 20,000 years ago. At its largest extent, Lake Missoula's depth exceeded 2,000 feet (600 m) and may have held 600 cubic miles (2,500 km^{3}) of water, as much as Lake Erie and Lake Ontario combined. The surface area covered 3,000 square miles (7,770 km^{2}) and the shoreline attained an elevation of 4,200 feet (1,300 m).

The lake spread through the Clark Fork River basin, reaching east of Missoula, 259 miles (417 km) to Gold Creek; northeast up the Blackfoot River 270 miles (430 km) to Lake Alva; 253 miles (407 km) and east of Ovando 270 miles (430 km). Two large lobes formed to the south and north. To the south the Bitterroot Valley filled as far as Sula, Montana, 286 miles (460 km). To the north the Flathead River basin became an expansive body of water, creating an island of Red Sleep Mountain (in the CSKT Bison Range) and extending north 286 miles (460 km) to Polson at the basin of the Flathead Ice Lobe and 286 miles (460 km) up the Little Bitterroot River to Niarada some 132 miles (212 km) above the Flathead Rivers mouth at the Clarks Fork.

The water was deep, with an average depth of 800 feet (245 m), and a maximum depth of 2,100 feet (640 m), dark and murky with sediment. Fish fossils have not been found in deposits of Lake Missoula. Possibly, glacial sediment, rock flour, suspended in the turbid lake water which created an hostile aquatic habitat for fish. In addition, fossils of large mammals (megafauna; e.g., mammoths, mastodons and bison), which may have roamed nearby, have not been found. Similarly, neither the remains nor artifacts of contemporaneous humans have been found associated with Lake Missoula. The Clark Fork River flows into Lake Pend Oreille at an elevation of 2,062 feet (628 m).

== Basins of Lake Missoula ==
Reaches of Glacial Lake Missoula
Reach	Riverway	Length	Max depth	Outlet	Features
Clark Fork Canyon	Clark Fork River	92 miles (148 km) from the ice dam at Lake Pend Oreille to Ninemile	2,150 feet (660 m)	Blocked at Lake Pend Orielle in Idaho	Eddy Narrows, St. Regis Notch, Ninemile Rhythmites
Flathead River Basin	Flathead River	71 miles (114 km) from the Clark Fork at Paradise to Polson, where the glacier stood	1,665 feet (507 m) at Perma	Joins the Clark Fork River at Paradise	Ninepipes Pingo Scars, Paradise Center, CSKT Bison Range, Sloan Bridge Sediments
Little Bitterroot Valley	Little Bitterroot River	43 miles (69 km) from the Flathead River to the glacial front near Niarada	1,363 feet (415 m) at Camas Prairie	Joins the Clark Fork River near Ninepipe National Wildlife Refuge at Sloan Bridge and crossed the divide between the Clark Fork and the Little Bitterroot Rivers at Rainbow Lake	Gulch Fill, Rainbow "Dog" Lake, Markle Pass Kolk, Camas Prairie Ripples
Missoula Basin	Clark Fork River	37 miles (60 km) from Ninemile to Lolo	1,176 feet (358 m) at Ninemile	Enters the lower Clark Fork Canyon Reach at Ninemile	Glacial erratic and Strandlines
Bitterroot Valley	Bitterroot River	68 miles (109 km) from Lolo in the Missoula Basin to near Sula	940 feet (290 m) at Lolo	Enters Missoula Basin at Lolo	Features
Blackfoot River Valley	Blackfoot River	57 miles (92 km) from Bonner to Rainy Lake on the Clearwater River and 73 miles (117 km) up the Blackfoot River to near Helmsville	566 feet (173 m) at Potomac	Joins the Clark Fork River	Features
Upper Clark Fork	Clark Fork River	55 miles (89 km) from the Bonner Flats to near Gold Creek on Interstate 90	1,197 feet (365 m) at Bonner	Enters the Missoula Basin of the Clark Fork River west of Bonner	Gold Creek High Water Monument

=== Clark Fork Canyon ===
This reach follows Montana Route 200 up the Clark Fork River canyon, 92 miles (148 km) to Paradise, then follows the Clark Fork, then 49 miles (79 km) through the Paradise-St. Regis Canyon along Montana Highway 135. At St. Regis, the canyon opens out and continues to the east 49 miles (79 km) with the river paralleled by Interstate 90 to as far as Ninemile, where it opens out into the Missoula basin. A western branch of this basin runs up the St. Regis River another 32 miles (51 km) along with Interstate 90 to near Riverbend.

- Lookout Pass, 4,679 feet (1,426 m) above sea level (asl) along Interstate 90
- Thompson Falls – Located in the northern or western reach of the basin, the modern river passes through a layer of harder rock, forming a cascade.
  Nine Mile Rhythmites – Located at the eastern end of the basin, near Nine Mile. A light pink sand and silt deposited on the bottom of the lake. The silt deposits exist where the basin was wide, and when the lake drained, the area was not reached by the fast current of the water moving downstream. Each lay represents a period of still water behind the ice dam. The series reflects each period of still water with the intervening draining of the lake. As with "varves", darker layers are winter deposits, comprising fine particles in quiet water, and the lighter layers are coarser particles from the more active summer currents. Here, the number of layers represent 1,000 years of sediment.

=== Flathead Basin ===
The Flathead basin abutted the south face of the ice sheet. For most of this period, the glacial ice reached south to Polson, covering the entirety of Flathead Lake. The basin drains from the Polson Moraine at the south end of Flathead Lake, south to Ravalli, with a major lobe up the Little Bitterroot River and a minor basin on Camas Creek near Perma.

- Little Money Creek Gulch Fill – Exit 96, north on US 93 to Ravalli. The coarse materials filled the side gulches on the narrow valley as Lake Missoula drained; eddy currents in tributary gulches deposited debris.
- Rainbow "Dog" Lake – Drains into the Clark Fork near Plains. During the existence of Lake Missoula, it was a drain for the Little Bitterroot basin when the lake level exceeded 3,620 feet (1,100 m) asl and for the Camas Prairie basin when the lake level exceeded 3,680 feet (1,120 m) asl. At the maximum depth of Lake Missoula, the valley was a 520-foot-deep (160 m) waterway. Rainbow Lake is thought to be a cataract retreat lake, formed by a 100-foot (30 m) waterfall. The Clark Fork River dropped 1,700 feet (520 m) near Plains, creating a 60-to-70-mile-per-hour (97 to 113 km/h) current through Boyer Creek. A weaker layer of rock beneath a more resistant layer was removed, causing the lip of the falls to retreat backward. Evidence is provided by the debris that lines the valley bottom.
- Camas Prairie Mega ripples – Camas Prairie is a small basin on Camas Creek, north of Perma. At the maximum water levels of the Hwy 382 through the prairie to information sign at mile marker13. Multiple long ridges of sediment, 25 feet (7.6 m) height and 100 feet (30 m) apart. Average height between 13 and 30 feet (4.0 and 9.1 m). Formed during the outflow of water during a break in the ice dam. The Camas Prairie Basin filled when Lake Missoula reached 2,770 feet (840 m) asl. As the water in the Lake Missoula Basin rose, this basin gained a second outlet through Rainbow Lake at 3,588 feet (1,094 m) asl; Willis Gulch 3,349 feet (1,021 m) asl; Markle Pass 3,352 feet (1,022 m) asl; and Big Gulch 3,435 feet (1,047 m) asl.
- Markle Pass Kolks – Montana Highway 382 travels through Markle Pass between Camas Prairie and the Little Bitterroot Valley. The Kolks were carved out of the bedrock by strong underwater vortices created as Lake Missoula quickly drained during the great floods. When the tornado-like currents reached the bottom of the waterway, rocks were pulled out of the bottom surface. This debris can be found downstream towards Camas Prairie and Burgess Lake.

=== Missoula Basin ===
The basin extends from Missoula, west to Ninemile and up the Ninemile Creek valley. This 39-mile-long (63 km) valley broadens from 5 miles (8 km) at Ninemile to 10 miles (16 km) at Missoula. The central part of this basin around Missoula is 8 miles (13 km) wide east–west and 10 miles (16 km) north-south. The basin is bordered by Rattlesnake Ridge on the north and Petty Mountain on the south(west). Features: strandlines along the valleys east flank.

- Glacial erratic on the grounds of the University of Montana
- Strandlines can be seen on the slopes of both Mount Jumbo (4,764 feet (1,452 m) asl) and Mount Sentinel (5,081 feet (1,549 m) asl), east in the Missoula Valley. These lines represent lake levels as the ice dam in the Purcell Trench failed and a lower lake level formed.
- Nine Mile Rhythmites on the bottom of the lake are visible.

=== Hamilton Basin ===
The basin extends from south of Conner to Lolo, 57 miles (92 km) to the north. The Bitterroot Mountains form the west shore and the Sapphire Mountains the east.

=== Blackfoot River Basin ===
The valleys of Potomac, Greenough, and Ovando-Helmville are linked by the Blackfoot River east of Missoula. A second reach, up the Clearwater River, joins the Blackfoot River at Clearwater. This basin joins the Clark Fork at Bonner. Upper valleys of the Clearwater-Blackfoot River basins run 394 miles (634 km) from Seeley Lake, eastward to Browns Lake along Montana Route 83 and Montana Route 200.

=== Upper Clark Fork ===
The Clark Fork of the Columbia River has its headwater near Butte, 130 miles (210 km) east of Missoula. Lake Missoula reached up the valley, about 55 miles (89 km) to the east along I-90 to just east of Gold Creek. Smaller reaches formed along the tributary valleys of Gold Creek, 13.5 miles (21.7 km) up Flint Creek, forming an 8-mile-wide (13 km) basin, up Lower Willow Creek, and 20 miles (32 km) up Rock Creek.

== See also ==
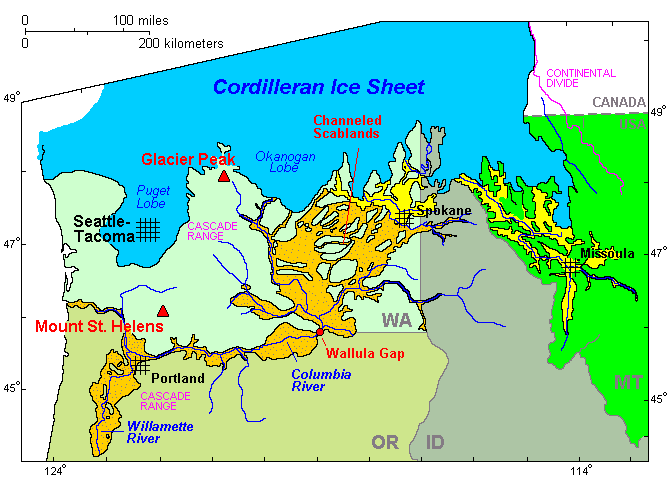
Cordilleran Ice Sheet maximum extent of Glacial Lake Missoula (eastern) and Glacial Lake Columbia (western) areas swept by Missoula and Columbia floods

- Missoula floods – Heavy floods of the last ice age
- Glacial lake outburst flood – Type of outburst flood that occurs when the dam containing a glacial lake fails
- Giant current ripples – Depositional forms in channeled scablands
- Ice Age Floods National Geologic Trail – Network of routes connecting natural sites
- List of prehistoric lakes
