= Ellen Zentner =

American economist

- Born: Ellen Beeson Zentner; United States
- Education: University of Colorado Denver
- Occupation: Economist
- Employer: Morgan Stanley

Ellen Beeson Zentner is an American managing director and the Chief US Economist at Morgan Stanley. Zentner previously worked as a Senior Economist for the Texas State government, Bank of Tokyo-Mitsubishi UFJ Ltd., and Nomura Securities International.

== Education ==
Zentner studied economics. For her bachelor's degree, Zentner studied business administration at the University of Colorado Denver. She continued her studies at the University of Colorado Denver to pursue a master's degree in economics with a focus in econometrics.

== Career ==
After graduate school, Zentner began her career at Texas State Comptroller as a Senior Economist in the Revenue Estimating Division. She worked there for five years, from 1998–2003, for Carole Keeton Strayhorn. There, she did a study on how the state of Texas's different taxes impacted households of different income levels.

Zentner moved to New York to work on Wall Street at the Bank of Tokyo-Mitsubishi UFJ Ltd. She worked as Senior US Macro Economist for eight years and monitored the U.S. economy to make forecasts. In May 2011, Zentner moved to Nomura Securities International, where she served as a Senior Economist for Fixed Income. In August 2013, Zentner joined Morgan Stanley, as a Senior U.S. Economist and managing director. In February 2015, Zentner was appointed as Chief U.S. Economist.

=== Economic and academic advisory panels ===
In 2015–2016, Zentner was president of New York Association for Business Economics. Zentner is currently involved in the New York Federal Reserve Bank's Economic Advisory panel, the Chicago Federal Reserve Bank's Academic Advisory Panel, and the American Bankers' Association Economic Advisory Committee. Zentner also sits on the board of directors for the National Association for Business Economics.

== Research and forecasts ==
=== "The Economic Cost of Inequality" ===
There are three parts in this paper: historic view of income and inequality, how income inequality has grown since the financial crisis, observable factors to close the income inequality gap. Historically, inequality has always been growing, as Zentner says, "For decades, the average American household had been taking on more and more debt to supplement the lack of income growth, all so that Middle America could stay, well, in the middle".
Zentner says, "What the financial crisis did was lay bare the ugliness of a growing income gap by removing the layer of debt accumulation that had been masking its presence". However, wages have been increasing among small businesses, households are experiencing less debt and more savings, and workers are having greater job stability.

=== Millennials, Gen Z and the Coming ‘Youth Boom’ Economy ===
Zentner discusses the implications of Generation Z, the generation born between 1997 and 2012, who will likely dominate the U.S. by 2034. Zentner and her economic team at Morgan Stanley project that the combination of Millennials and Gen Z in the U.S. workforce will yield higher consumption, wages, and housing demand, thus stimulating GDP growth. However, these impacts of the demographic shifts are not taken into account in the Congressional Budget Office's projections for growth in the labour force. Zentner says, "The CBO projections understate potential labor-force growth by 0.2 to 0.3% per year in the 15 years through 2040. We concluded that the CBO forecasts could be underestimating the level of potential GDP in 2040 by as much as 2.4% to 4.3%”. Besides beyond-average GDP growth, Social Security and Medicare solvency have an optimistic outlook. Between the 2020s and 2040s, investors may take a bullish view on the U.S. economy. Zentner says, “Powered by the economic machine of Gens Y and Z, the prime working-age population is projected to accelerate into the 2030...We project trend consumption growth moves up steadily to average 2.5% in the 2030s, driven by Millennials, and then Gen Z, moving through their prime working years". Some supporting contributors of the "youth boom" include: new Gen Z entrants to the workforce are more financially stable compared to Millennials, more jobs are available, cheaper college tuition, better skills match to available jobs, and no generational gap between Millennials and Gen Z, thus driving an increase in productivity in the workforce. A virtuous cycle of growth is created to the growing labour force, productivity, income, and consumer spending.

== Awards and recognition ==
Zentner received the Lawrence Klein Award in 2018 and 2020.

== Personal life ==
Zentner is an avid fly fisher.
