= American settlers =

American settlers is a broad-concept term which may refer to:

- Settlement of the Americas, which began when Paleolithic hunter-gatherers entered North America via the Beringia land bridge from Siberia
- European colonization of the Americas, which began in 1492, when a Spanish expedition headed by the explorer Christopher Columbus sailed west and landed in what came to be known to Europeans as the "New World"
  - Colonial history of the United States, European colonization of America from the start of colonization in the early 16th century
- American pioneers, settlers who moved westward across North America in the 18th and 19th centuries
  - Manifest destiny, a cultural belief popularized in the mid-19th century which encouraged the westward movement of settlers across North America
- Later migrations of specific groups to the United States:
  - History of Chinese Americans includes three major waves of Chinese immigration to the United States with the first beginning in the 19th century
  - Cuban immigration to the United States
  - Emigration from Mexico, primarily to the United States
  - Central American migrant caravans, composed of people who fled gang violence, poverty, and political repression with the goal of settling in the United States

== See also ==
- History of immigration to the United States
- American diaspora, Americans who relocate, temporarily or permanently, to foreign countries
