= Purcell Trench =

Large valley in the Rocky Mountains

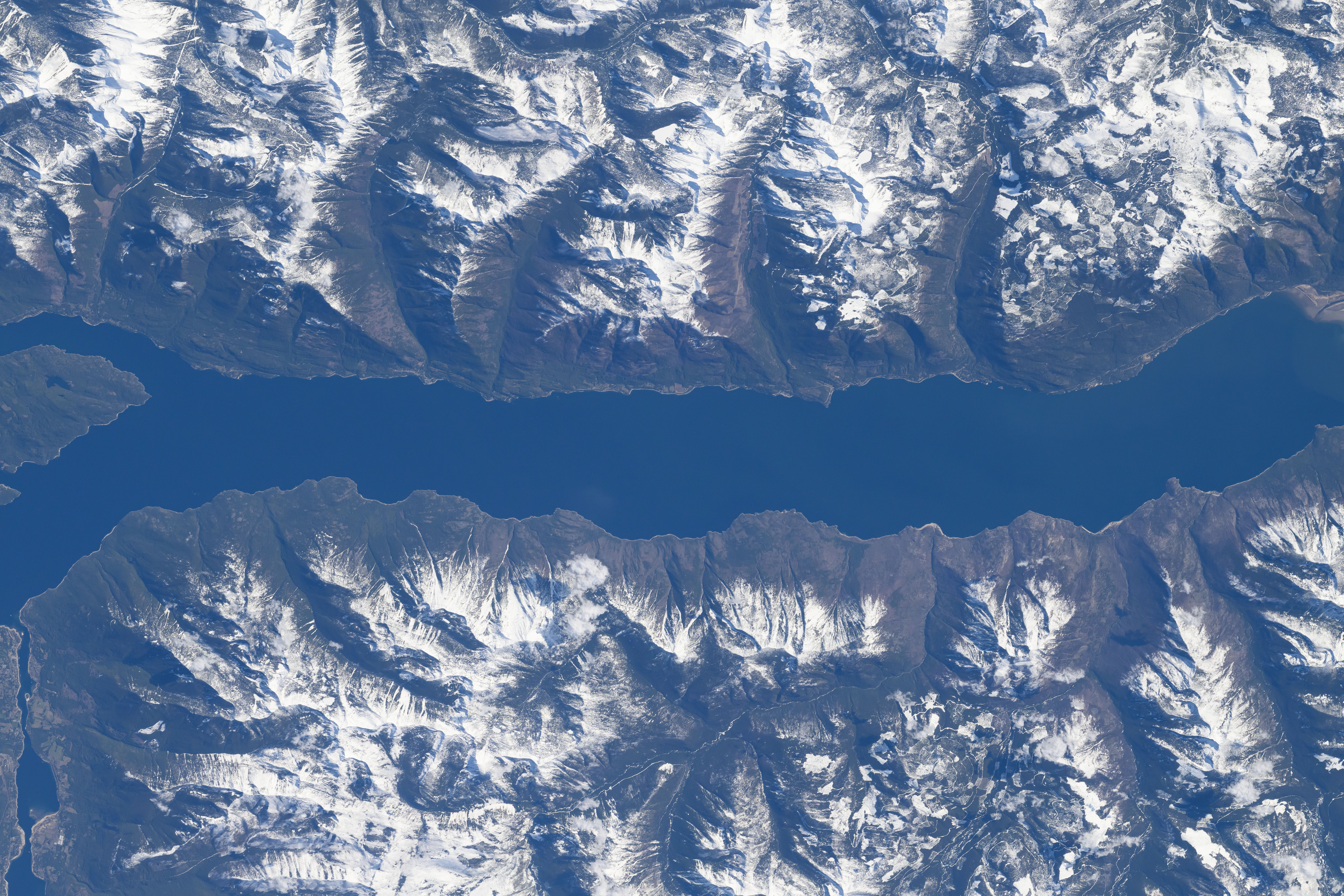
- Kootenay Lake in the Purcell Trench (north is to the left)
- Length: 179 miles (288 km)

Geography
- Coordinates: 49°39′N 116°54′W
- Interactive map of Purcell Trench

The Purcell Trench, also known as the Kootenay River Valley, is a large valley on the western side of the northern part of North America's Rocky Mountains. The trench extends approximately 179 miles (288 km) from Lake Pend Oreille, Idaho, down the Kootenay River (north) to Kootenay Lake, up the north arm to Duncan Lake. It joins the Rocky Mountain Trench another 50 miles (80 km) northward at the south tip of Kinbasket Lake, in British Columbia. The trench bottom is 1 to 7 miles (1.6 to 11.3 km) wide and is 1,750 to 2,100 feet (530 to 640 m) above sea level. The trench is nearly a straight north or south line. Some of its topography has been carved into U-shaped glacial valleys, it is primarily a product of geologic faulting. The trench splits the Columbia Mountains between the Purcell Mountains on the east and the Selkirk Mountains on the west.

== Geology ==
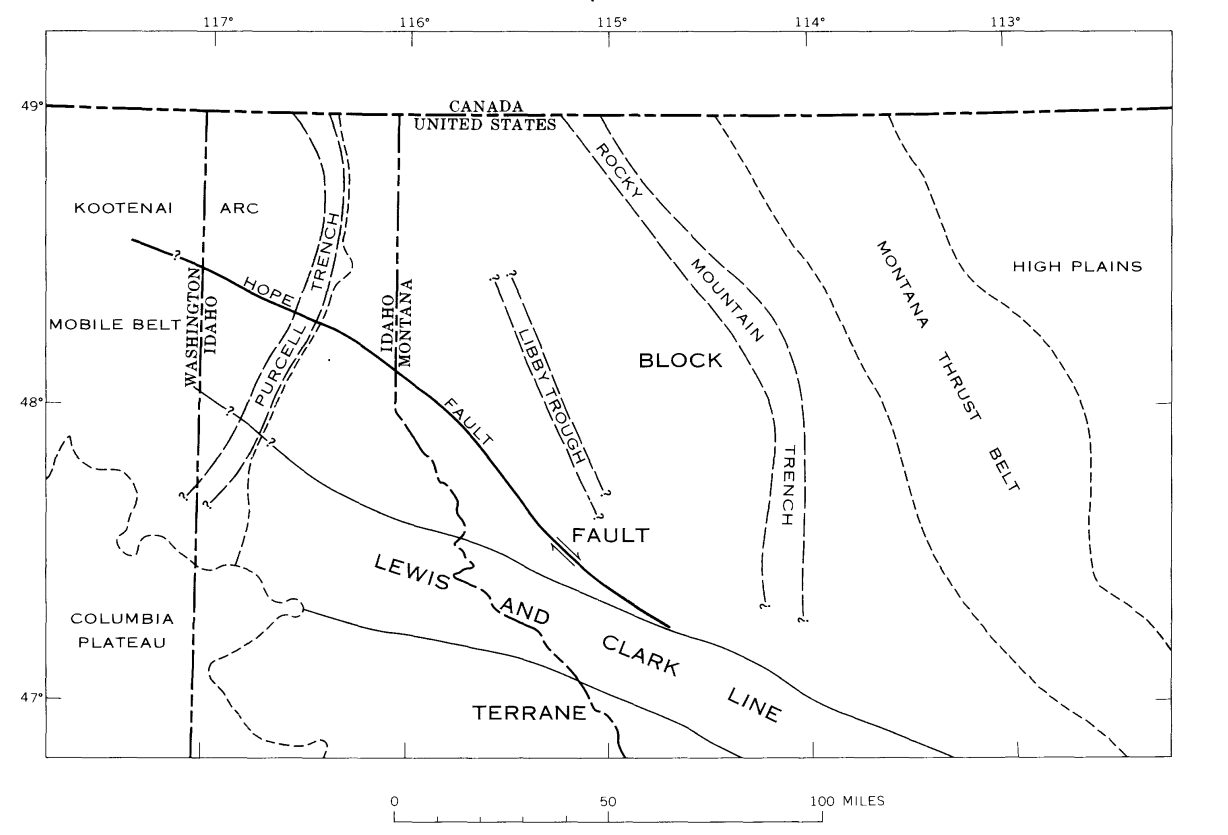
Purcell and Rocky Mountain Trenches within the US

The Priest River complex in northern Idaho, northeastern Washington, and southeastern British Columbia is a series of early and middle Eocene metamorphic core complexes that extend southward from the south-central Canadian Cordillera to the Columbia Plateau and southeastward to the Idaho Batholith. The east side of the Priest River complex on forms the west wall of the Purcell Trench.

=== Purcell Trench Faults ===
The Purcell Trench is divided into three segments. The southern segment, which extends from Lake Coeur d'Alene through Sandpoint to north of Colburn, contains compelling evidence of the east-dipping Purcell Trench normal fault. The middle segment, which extends from Colburn and Naples, is unfaulted. The northern segment from Naples to Kootenay Lake also contains evidence of a major eastdipping normal fault.

== Glaciation ==
The width and depth of the inner valley of the Kootenai River in Boundary County, Idaho, when the first glaciers arrived is unknown. The valley floor higher than the present outlet from the west arm of Kootenay Lake near Nelson, British Columbia, which is about 1,730 feet (530 m) above sea level (asl); it could have been as much as 2,000 feet (610 m) asl. There were at least three glacial invasions with their associated receding ice fronts. As of 1953 it was not possible to differentiate the effects of the earlier Illinoian and earlier glacial periods below Bonners Ferry from those of the Wisconsin glaciation period. It appears doubtful that the pre-Wisconsin ice sheets of the Cordilleran ice sheet reach to the valley of the Pend Oreille River.

Each time the glaciers began to retreat, they blocked the northward drainage of meltwater and flooded the valley. This allowed hundreds of feet of fine-grained, silty sediment to deposit in the Purcell Trench and create the flat terraces seen today near Bonners Ferry.

== See also ==
- Rocky Mountain Trench
