= Missoula floods =

Heavy floods of the last ice age

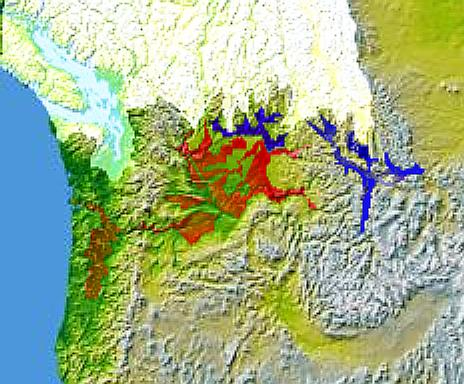
- Glacial Lake Columbia (west) and Glacial Lake Missoula (east) are shown south of the Cordilleran ice sheet. The areas inundated in the Columbia and Missoula floods are shown in red.
- Cause: Ice dam ruptures

Meteorological history
- Duration: Between 15,000 and 13,000 years ago

Flood

Overall effects
- Areas affected: The current states of: Idaho, Washington, and Oregon

The Missoula floods (also known as the Spokane floods, the Bretz floods, or Bretz's floods) were a series of cataclysmic glacial lake outburst floods that swept periodically across the area that would become eastern Washington, northern Idaho and northern Oregon, and down the Columbia River Gorge at the end of the last ice age. These floods were the result of periodic sudden ruptures of the ice dam on the Clark Fork River that created Glacial Lake Missoula. After each ice dam rupture, the waters of the lake would rush down the Clark Fork and the Columbia River, flooding much of eastern Washington and the Willamette Valley in western Oregon. After the lake drained, the ice would reform, creating glacial Lake Missoula again.

== Early flood stories and postulates ==
Native American flood stories have been passed on for millennia and may have been inspired by firsthand witnesses of the ancient megafloods. The Kalapuya people described an atswin (flood) in the story of "Panther, Coyote, Whale's Daughter, The Flood, Obtaining the Fire". Evidence also comes from local topographic naming. The Sahaptin name given to the Rattlesnake Ridge near Hanford, Washington is Laliik, which translates as "stands above the water". Yet, there is no water around Rattlesnake Ridge today.

Some early explorers, military, local teachers and scientists had from the beginning ascribed the Scablands to extensive flows of water. Probably the two most germane to the flood story are the 1882 expedition of Lt. Thomas William Symons (U.S. Army Corps of Engineers) for naming glacial Lake Lewis and the 1885 explorations of T.C. Chamberlin for identifying the source of the floodwater as Glacial Lake Missoula. In March 1917, Thomas Bonser wrote an article for The Spokesman-Review about pre-historic Spokane, in which he accurately described what is now called Glacial Lake Columbia. In 1910, J. Pardee published a paper that identified Glacial Lake Missoula.

Thomas Large, Alonzo Pearl Troth, Thomas Bonser, Joseph McMacken, and others conducted fieldwork in and around Spokane that led to a deeper understanding of the local geology and paleobotany. Their work made the previous existence of a giant lake in that area widely known not only to scientists, but also to the general public. Thomas Large reported in 1922 his own observations regarding glaciations and possible floods in Science and gave the hypothetical lake the name Lake Spokane.

== Flood estimates ==
These floods have been researched since the 1920s. During the last deglaciation that followed the end of the Last Glacial Maximum, geologists estimate that a cycle of flooding and reformation of the lake lasted an average of 55 years and that the floods occurred dozens of times over the 2,000 years between 15,000 and 13,000 years ago. U.S. Geological Survey hydrologist Jim O'Connor and Spain's Museo Nacional de Ciencias Naturales scientist Gerardo Benito have found evidence of at least twenty-five massive floods, the largest discharging about 10 cubic kilometers per hour (2.7 million m³/s, 13 times that of the Amazon River). Alternate estimates for the peak flow rate of the largest flood range up to 17 cubic kilometers per hour. The maximum flow speed approached 36 meters/second (130 km/h or 80 mph).

Within the Columbia River drainage basin, detailed investigation of the Missoula floods' glaciofluvial deposits, informally known as the Hanford formation, has documented the presence of Middle and Early Pleistocene Missoula flood deposits within the Othello Channels, Columbia River Gorge, Channeled Scabland, Quincy Basin, Pasco Basin, and the Walla Walla Valley. Based on the presence of multiple interglacial calcretes interbedded with flood deposits, magnetostratigraphy, optically stimulated luminescence dating, and unconformity truncated clastic dikes, it has been estimated that the oldest of the Pleistocene Missoula floods happened before 1.5 million years ago. Because of the fragmentary nature of older glaciofluvial deposits, which have been largely removed by subsequent Missoula floods, within the Hanford formation, the exact number of older Missoula floods, which are known as ancient cataclysmic floods, that occurred during the Pleistocene cannot be estimated with any confidence.

== Flood hypothesis proposed ==
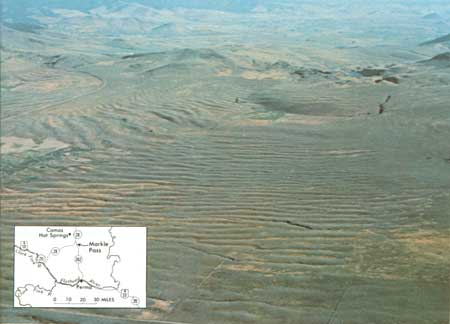
Giant ripple marks at Markle Pass near Camas Hot Springs, Montana, U.S. View towards the northwest.

Geologist J Harlen Bretz first recognized evidence of the catastrophic floods, which he called the Spokane floods, in the 1920s. He was researching the Channeled Scablands in Eastern Washington, the Columbia Gorge, and the Willamette Valley of Oregon. Beginning in the summer of 1922, Bretz conducted field research on the Columbia River Plateau for the next seven years. He had been interested in unusual erosion features in the area since 1910 after seeing a newly published topographic map of the Potholes Cataract. Bretz coined the term Channeled Scablands in 1923 to refer to the area near the Grand Coulee, where massive erosion had cut through basalt deposits. Bretz published a paper in 1923 arguing that the Channeled Scablands in Eastern Washington were caused by massive flooding in the distant past.

Bretz's view, which was seen as arguing for a catastrophic explanation of the geology, ran against the prevailing view of uniformitarianism, and Bretz's views were initially disregarded. The Geological Society of Washington, D.C., invited the young Bretz to present his previously published research at a January 12, 1927, meeting where several other geologists presented competing theories. Another geologist at the meeting, J.T. Pardee, had worked with Bretz and had evidence of an ancient glacial lake that lent credence to Bretz's theories. Bretz defended his theories, which kicked off an acrimonious 40-year debate over the origin of the Scablands. Both Pardee and Bretz continued their research over the next 30 years, collecting and analyzing evidence that led them to identify Lake Missoula as the source of the Spokane flood and creator of the channeled scablands.

After Pardee studied the canyon of the Flathead River, he estimated that flood waters above 45 miles per hour (72 km/h) would be required to roll the largest of the boulders moved by the flood. He estimated the water flow was 9 cubic miles per hour (38 km^{3}/h), more than the combined flow of every river in the world. More recent estimates place the flow rate at ten times the flow of all current rivers combined.

The Missoula floods have also been referred to as the Bretz floods in honor of Bretz.

== Flood initiation ==
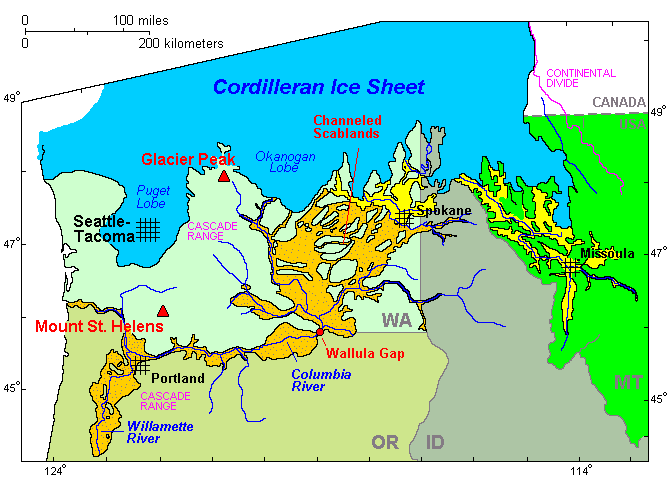
Cordilleran ice sheet maximum extent of Glacial Lake Missoula (eastern) and Glacial Lake Columbia (western) areas swept by Missoula and Columbia floods

The Cordilleran ice sheet formed a glacial dam across the Clark Fork valley, creating a large lake just southeast of modern-day Sandpoint. Repeated failures of this dam triggered jökulhlaups, a type of glacial outburst flood. The exact cause of these failures is disputed. Cataclysms on the Columbia: The Great Missoula Floods suggests that the ice dam may have been floated by the lake, allowing water to flow underneath and disintegrate the dam. A 2020 review article found that either overtopping or tunneling, possibly accompanied by thermal erosion, caused the dam to fail.

== Flood events ==
As the water emerged from the Columbia River gorge, it backed up again at the 1 mile (1.6 km) wide narrows near Kalama, Washington. Some temporary lakes rose to an elevation of more than 400 ft (120 m), flooding the Willamette Valley to Eugene, Oregon and beyond. Iceberg-rafted glacial erratics and erosion features are evidence of these events. Lake-bottom sediments deposited by the floods have contributed to the agricultural richness of the Willamette and Columbia Valleys. Glacial deposits overlaid with centuries of windblown sediments (loess) have scattered steep, southerly sloping dunes throughout the Columbia Valley, ideal conditions for orchard and vineyard development at higher latitudes.

After analysis and controversy, geologists now believe that there were 40 or more separate floods, although the exact source of the water is still being debated. The peak flow of the floods is estimated to be 27 cubic kilometers per hour (6.5 cubic miles per hour). The maximum flow speed approached 36 meters/second (130 km/h or 80 mph). Up to 1.9×10^{19} joules of potential energy were released by each flood (the equivalent of 4,500 megatons of TNT). For comparison, this is 90 times more powerful than the most powerful nuclear weapon ever detonated, the 50-megaton "Tsar Bomba". The cumulative effect of the floods was to excavate 210 cubic kilometres (50 cu mi) of loess, sediment, and basalt from the Channeled Scablands of eastern Washington and to transport it downstream.

=== Multiple flood hypothesis ===
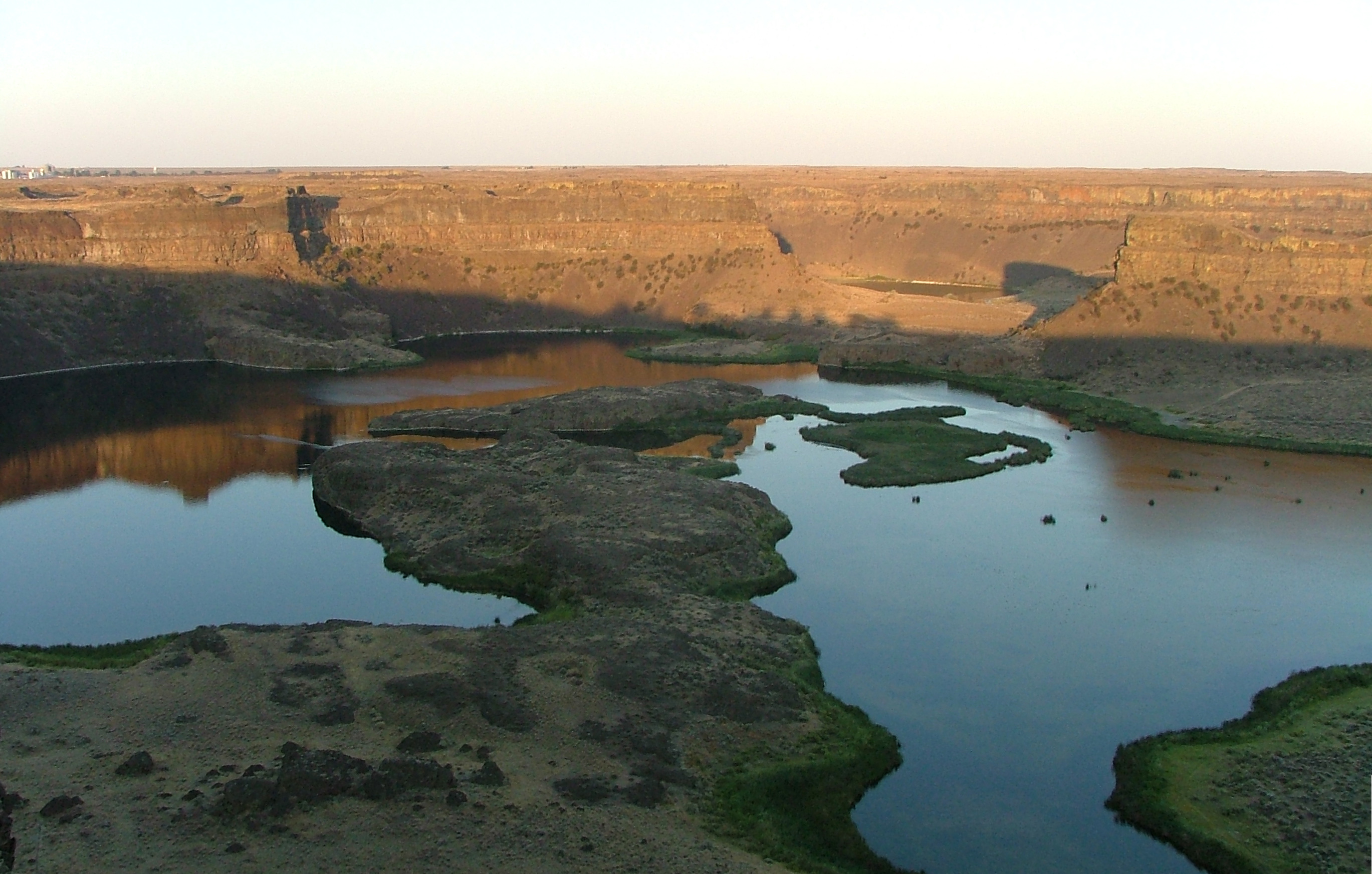
During the ice age floods, Dry Falls was under 300 feet (91 m) of water approaching at a speed of 65 miles per hour (105 km/h).

The multiple flood hypothesis was first proposed by R.B. Waitt Jr. in 1980. Waitt argued for a sequence of 40 or more floods. Waitt's proposal was based mainly on analysis from glacial lake bottom deposits in Ninemile Creek and the flood deposits in Burlingame Canyon. His most compelling argument for separate floods was that the Touchet bed deposits from two successive floods were found to be separated by two layers of volcanic ash (tephra), with the ash separated by a fine layer of windblown dust deposits, located in a thin layer between sediment layers ten rhythmites below the top of the Touchet beds. The two layers of volcanic ash are separated by 1–10 centimetres (0.4–3.9 in) of airborne nonvolcanic silt. The tephra is Mount St. Helens ash that fell in Eastern Washington. By analogy, since there were 40 layers with comparable characteristics at Burlingame Canyon, Waitt argued they all could be considered to have similar separation in deposition time.

=== Controversy over the number and source of floods ===
The controversy about whether the Channeled Scabland landforms were formed mainly by multiple periodic floods or by a single grand-scale cataclysmic flood from late Pleistocene Glacial Lake Missoula or an unidentified Canadian source continued through 1999. Shaw's team of geologists reviewed the sedimentary sequences of the Touchet beds and concluded that the sequences do not automatically imply multiple floods separated by decades or centuries. Rather, they proposed that sedimentation in the Glacial Lake Missoula basin resulted from jökulhlaups draining into Lake Missoula from British Columbia to the north. Further, Shaw's team proposed the scabland flooding might have partially originated from an enormous subglacial reservoir that extended over much of central British Columbia, particularly including the Rocky Mountain Trench, which may have discharged by several paths, including one through Lake Missoula. This discharge, if occurring concurrently with the breach of the Lake Missoula ice dam, would have provided significantly larger volumes of water. Further, Shaw and the team proposed that the rhythmic Touchet beds result from multiple pulses or surges within a larger flood.

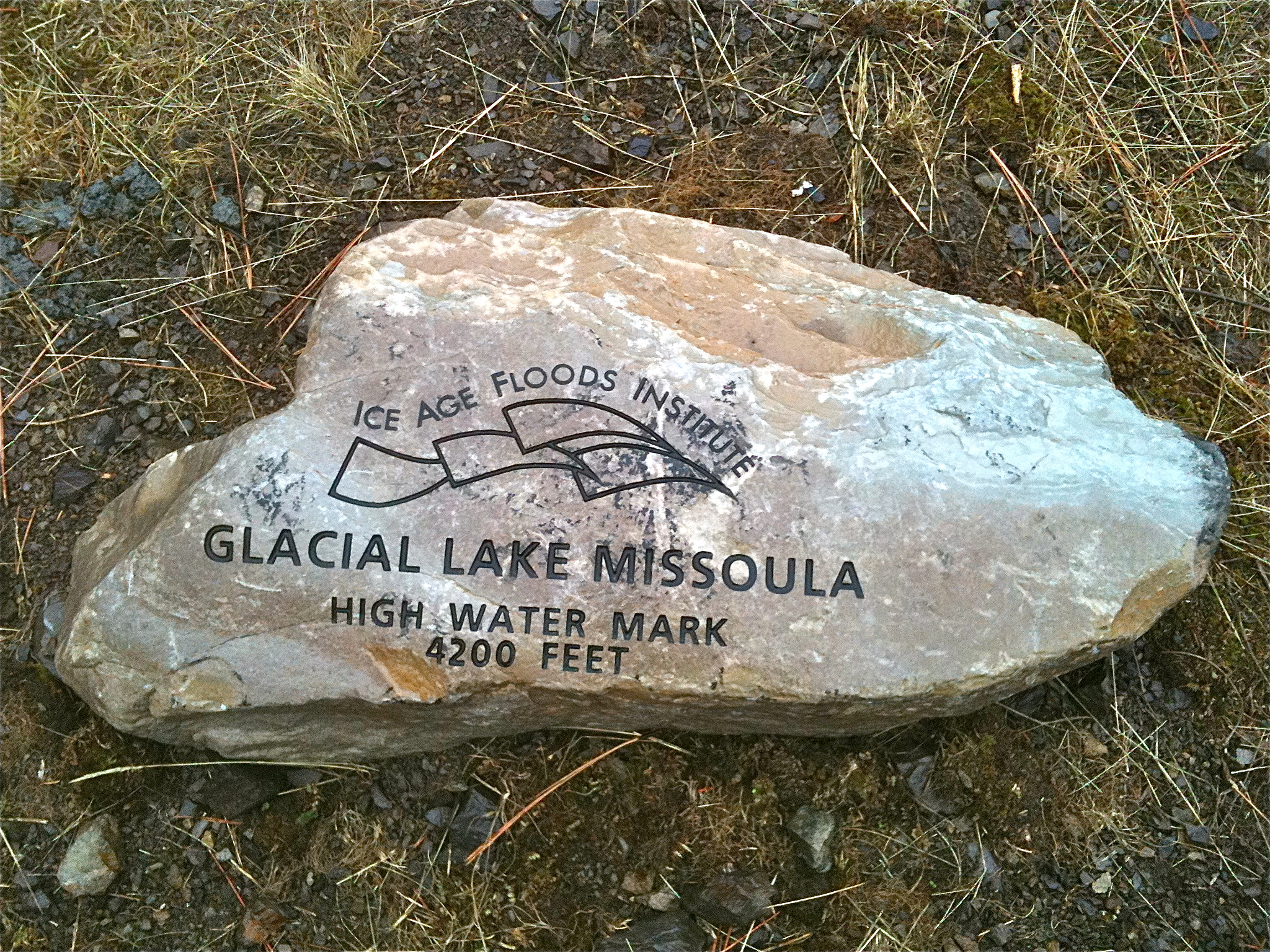
Glacial Lake Missoula high-water mark, 4,200 feet (1,280 m), near Missoula, MT

In 2000, a team led by Komatsu simulated the floods numerically with a 3-dimensional hydraulic model. They based the Glacial Lake Missoula discharge rate on the rate predicted for the Spokane Valley–Rathdrum Prairie immediately downstream of Glacial Lake Missoula, for which several previous estimates had placed the maximum discharge of 17 × 10^{6}m^{3}/s and the total amount of water discharged equal to the maximum estimated volume of Lake Missoula (2184 km^{3}). Neglecting erosion effects, their simulated water flow was based on modern-day topography. Their major findings were that the calculated water depth in each flooded location except for the Spokane Valley–Rathdrum Prairie was shallower than the field evidence showed. For example, their calculated water depth at the Pasco Basin–Wallula Gap transition zone is about 190 m, significantly less than the 280–300 m flood depth indicated by high-water marks. They concluded that a flood of ~10^{6}m^{3}/s could not have made the observed high-water marks.

In a comment on the Komatsu analysis, Brian Atwater and colleagues observed substantial evidence for multiple large floods, including mud cracks and animal burrows in lower layers, which were filled by sediment from later floods. Further, evidence for multiple flood flows up sidearms of Glacial Lake Columbia spread over many centuries has been found. They also pointed out that the discharge point from Lake Columbia varied with time, originally flowing across the Waterville Plateau into Moses Coulee, but later, when the Okanagan lobe blocked that route, eroding the Grand Coulee to discharge there as a substantially lower outlet. The Komatsu analysis does not evaluate the impact of the considerable erosion observed in this basin during the flood or floods. However, the assumption that flood hydraulics can be modeled using modern-day topography is an area that warrants further consideration. Earlier narrower constrictions at places such as Wallula Gap and through the Columbia Gorge would be expected to produce higher flow resistance and correspondingly higher floods.

=== The current understanding ===
The dating for Waitt's proposed separation of layers into sequential floods has been supported by subsequent paleomagnetism studies, which support a 30–40 year interval between depositions of Mount St. Helens' ash, and hence flood events, but do not preclude an up to 60-year interval. Offshore deposits on the bed of the Pacific at the mouth of the Columbia River include 120 meters of material deposited over a several thousand-year period corresponding to multiple scabland floods seen in the Touchet Beds. Based on Waitt's identification of 40 floods, this would give an average separation between floods of 50 years.

== See also ==
- Giant current ripples – Depositional forms in channeled scablands
- Glacial lake outburst flood – Type of outburst flood that occurs when the dam containing a glacial lake fails
- Bonneville flood – Catastrophic flooding event in the last ice age
- Ice Age Floods National Geologic Trail – Network of routes connecting natural sites
- Pendant bar – Streamlined gravel bar below an obstruction
- Rhythmite – Layers of sediment or sedimentary rock laid down with periodicity and regularity
- Varve – Annual layer of sediment or sedimentary rock
- Floods in the United States before 1900 - Overview of all ancient floods in the United States
