= J Harlen Bretz =

American geologist who discovered the Missoula Floods

J Harlen "Harley" Bretz
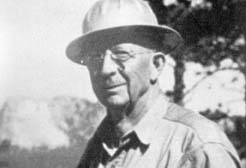
- J Harlen Bretz in 1949
- Born: Harlan J Bretz; September 2, 1882; Saranac, Michigan, US
- Died: February 3, 1981 (aged 98); Homewood, Illinois
- Other name: Harland J Bretz
- Education: Albion College (BA); University of Chicago (PhD)
- Known for: Missoula floods hypothesis, overturned uniformitarianism
- Awards: Penrose Medal, 1979
- Scientific career
- Fields: Geology
- Institutions: University of Washington, University of Chicago

J Harlen Bretz (September 2, 1882 – February 3, 1981) was an American geologist, best known for his research that led to the acceptance of the Missoula floods and for his work on caves.

== Early life and education ==
Bretz was born on September 2, 1882, in the small town of Saranac, Michigan. He was the first of Oliver Joseph Bretz and Rhoda Maria Howlett's five children. His father was a farmer, and a descendant of early German settlers in Ohio, John Bretz.

The county's birth registry recorded his name as "Harlan J Bretz" at birth, but he was listed as "Harland J Bretz" on the 1900 United States Census. When he entered college in 1901, he applied as "J Harlen Bretz". At around the time he completed his graduate studies in 1913, he stopped using a point after the initial at "J". According to his two children, his given name was actually "Harley". Bretz's daughter Rhoda Bretz Riley went on to explain that "he invented the Harlen thing, just as he had invented the J in front of his name", though this contradicts official records. Most friends and associates just called him "Doc" in his later life.

Bretz earned an AB degree in biology from Albion College in 1905, then started his career as a high school History and Physiography (study of the physical features of the Earth's surface) teacher in Seattle. During this time, he became interested in the geology of Eastern Washington, and began studying the glacial geology of the Puget Sound area. He continued his studies at the University of Chicago where he earned his PhD in geology in 1913. He became an assistant professor of geology, first at the University of Washington and then the University of Chicago.

== Spokane floods ==
In the summer of 1922, and for the next seven years, Bretz conducted field research of the Columbia River Plateau. From the summer of 1922 through 1931 he wrote 15 papers.

Since 1910 he had been interested in unusual erosion features in the area after seeing a newly published topographic map of the Potholes Cataract. Bretz coined the term Channeled Scablands in 1923 to describe the area near the Grand Coulee, where massive erosion had cut through basalt deposits. The area was a desert, but Bretz's theories required cataclysmic water flows to form the landscape, for which Bretz coined the term Spokane Floods in a 1925 publication.

Bretz published a paper in 1923, arguing that the Channelled Scablands in Eastern Washington were caused by massive flooding in the distant past. This was seen as arguing for a catastrophic explanation of the geology, against the prevailing view of uniformitarianism, and Bretz's views were initially met with skepticism (but repeatedly passed peer review). However, as the nature of the Ice Age was better understood, Bretz's original research was vindicated, and by the 1950s his conclusions were also vindicated.

Bretz encountered resistance to his theories from the geology establishment of the day. The geology establishment was resistant to this theory for the origin of a broad landscape for a variety of reasons, including lack of familiarity with the remote areas of the interior Pacific Northwest where the research was based, and the lack of status and reputation of Bretz in the eyes of the geology establishment. Furthermore, his theory implied the potential possibilities of a Biblical flood, which the scientific community rejected. The Geological Society of Washington invited the young Bretz to present his previously published research at a meeting on January 12, 1927, where several other geologists presented competing theories. Bretz saw this as an ambush, and referred to the group as six "challenging elders". Their intention was to defeat him in a public debate, and thereby end the challenge his theories posed to their conservative interpretation of uniformitarianism.

Another geologist at the meeting, Joseph Pardee, had worked with Bretz and had evidence of an ancient glacial lake that lent credence to Bretz's theories. Pardee, however, lacked the academic freedom of Bretz, as he worked for the United States Geological Survey, so did not enter the fray.

Bretz defended his theories, kicking off an acrimonious 40-year debate over the origin of the Scablands. As he wrote in 1928, "Ideas without precedent are generally looked upon with disfavor and men are shocked if their conceptions of an orderly world are challenged". One of Bretz's most vocal academic opponents was Richard Foster Flint.

Both Pardee and Bretz continued their research over the next 30 years, collecting, analyzing and successfully publishing evidence that eventually identified Lake Missoula as the source of the Spokane Floods and creator of the Channelled Scablands. Research on open channel hydraulics and NASA satellite images in the 1970s further vindicated Bretz's and Pardee's theories.

National Geographic observes: "As philosopher Thomas Kuhn observed, new scientific truths often win the day not so much because opponents change their minds, but because they die off. By the time the Geological Society of America recognized Bretz's work with the Penrose Medal, the field's highest honor, it was 1979 and Bretz was 96 years old. He joked to his son, "All my enemies are dead, so I have no one to gloat over."

== Caves and karst ==
Bretz wrote an extremely influential paper on the morphology and origin of limestone caves in 1942, followed by detailed studies of the caves of Missouri in 1956, and Illinois with Stanley Harris, in 1961.

== Later life ==
Bretz and his wife Fanny Belle Challis (1881–1972), whom he had met at Albion College, married in 1906, and had two children, Rudolf Challis Bretz and Rhoda Bretz Riley. The Bretz family settled in Homewood, Illinois where they bought property and constructed a Sears Catalog Home on it in 1921. Bretz nicknamed the property "Boulderstrewn" because of all the rocks and minerals he collected and was given that were placed around the property. He donated a portion of this collection to Albion College in the 1970s. Boulderstrewn was renowned for being an active place, where Bretz hosted many parties with students and faculty from the University of Chicago. His post-retirement body of work includes Geology of the Chicago Region (1955), The Caves of Missouri (1956), Washington's Channeled Scabland (1959), Caves of Illinois (1961), and Geomorphic History of the Ozarks (1965), in addition to his 1949 Incomplete Genealogy of the Family of John Bretz Of Fairfield Co, Ohio, with a Partial History of One Line of Descent in this Family.

== Awards and honors ==
The National Speleological Society made Bretz an honorary member in 1954.

Bretz received the Penrose Medal, the Geological Society of America's highest award, in 1979, at the age of 96. After this award, he told his son: "All my enemies are dead, so I have no one to gloat over."

Each year at Albion College, the J Harlen Bretz Award is given to the most outstanding senior in the geology department.

A plaque was dedicated to Bretz in 1994 outside the Dry Falls Visitor Center at Dry Falls State Park in Coulee City, Washington that reads "Dedicated to J Harlen Bretz who patiently taught us that catastrophic floods may sometimes play a role in nature's unfolding drama".

== Bibliography ==
- Allen, John Eliot; Burns, Marjorie; Sargent, Sam C (2009). Cataclysms on the Columbia: The Great Missoula Floods. Ooligan Press. ISBN 978-1932010312.
- Bretz, J. Harlen (1913), Glaciation of the Puget Sound Region (PDF), Bulletin No. 8, Washington Geological Survey
- Bretz, J Harlen (1923). "The Channeled Scabland of the Columbia Plateau". Journal of Geology. 31 (8): 617–649. Bibcode:1923JG.....31..617B. doi:10.1086/623053. S2CID 129657556.
- Bretz, J Harlen (1925). "The Spokane flood beyond the Channeled Scablands". Journal of Geology. 33 (2): 97–115, 236–259. Bibcode:1925JG.....33...97B. doi:10.1086/623179. S2CID 140554172.
- Bretz, J Harlen (1942). "Vadose and phreatic features of limestone caverns". Journal of Geology. 50 (6, Part II): 675–811. Bibcode:1942JG.....50..675B. doi:10.1086/625074. S2CID 129511640.
- Bretz, J Harlen (1956). The Caves of Missouri. Missouri Geological Survey and Water Resources. p. 490.
- Bretz, J Harlen (1961). The Caves of Illinois. Illinois State Geological Survey. p. 87.
- Bretz, J Harlen (1949). "The Bretz Register: An Incomplete Genealogy of the Family of John Bretz of Fairfield Co, Ohio, with a Partial History with One Line of Descent in this Family". Archived from the original on October 20, 2009. Digitized for the web by Michael McMillan.
- Soennichsen, John (2008). Bretz's Flood: The Remarkable Story of a Rebel Geologist and the World's Greatest Flood. Seattle: Sasquatch Books. ISBN 978-1-57061-505-4.
- Weis, Paul L; Newman, William L (1976). The Channeled Scablands of Eastern Washington: The Geologic Story of the Spokane Flood (PDF). US Geological Survey.
