= List of places in New York: P =

This list of current cities, towns, unincorporated communities, counties, and other recognized places in the U.S. state of New York also includes information on the number and names of counties in which the place lies, and its lower and upper zip code bounds, if applicable.

List of places in New York: A | B | C | D | E | F | G | H | I | J | K | L | M | N | O | P | Q | R | S | T | U | V | W | X | Y | Z

Name of place	Counties	Principal county	Lower zip code	Upper zip code
Pacama	1	Ulster County	12401	
Pachin Mills	1	Dutchess County		
Packwood Corners	1	Seneca County		
Paddlefords	1	Ontario County	14424	
Paddy Hill	1	Jefferson County	13615	
Padelford	1	Ontario County	14424	
Page	1	Lewis County		
Page Brook	1	Chenango County		
Pages Corner	1	Saratoga County		
Pail Shop Corners	1	Otsego County		
Paines Hollow	1	Herkimer County	13407	
Painted Post	1	Steuben County	14870	
Palatine	1	Montgomery County		
Palatine Bridge	1	Montgomery County	13428	
Palentown	1	Ulster County	12446	
Palenville	1	Greene County	12463	
Palermo	1	Oswego County	13069	
Palermo	1	Oswego County		
Palisades	1	Rockland County	10964	
Palm Tree	1	Orange County		
Palmer	1	Saratoga County	12822	
Palmerville	1	St. Lawrence County		
Palmyra	1	Wayne County	14522	
Palmyra	1	Wayne County		
Pamelia	1	Jefferson County		
Pamelia Four Corners	1	Jefferson County	13637	
Panama	1	Chautauqua County	14767	
Panama	1	Chautauqua County		
Pan Am Building	1	New York County	10022	
Panorama	1	Monroe County	14625	
Panther Lake	1	Oswego County	13028	
Pantigo	1	Suffolk County	11937	
Paper Mill Corners	1	Herkimer County		
Paradise	1	Orange County		
Paradise Beach	1	Warren County		
Paradise Hill	1	Greene County		
Paradise Hill	1	Oneida County		
Paradox	1	Essex County	12858	
Parc	1	Clinton County		
Parcells Corner	1	Chautauqua County	14062	
Parcel Post	1	Kings County	11215	
Parcel Post	1	Nassau County	11550	
Parcel Post	1	Queens County	11101	
Paris	1	Oneida County	13429	
Paris	1	Oneida County		
Parish	1	Oswego County	13131	
Parish	1	Oswego County		
Parish Center	1	Oswego County		
Parishville	1	St. Lawrence County	13672	
Parishville	1	St. Lawrence County		
Parishville Center	1	St. Lawrence County	13676	
Paris Station	1	Oneida County	13456	
Parkchester	1	Bronx County	10462	
Parker	1	Chenango County		
Parkers	1	Lewis County		
Parkers Corners	1	Albany County		
Park Hill	1	Onondaga County	13057	
Park Hill	1	Westchester County		
Parkis Mills	1	Saratoga County		
Park of Edgewater	1	Bronx County		
Parkside	1	Queens County	11375	
Parkside	1	Westchester County		
Park Slope	1	Kings County	11215	
Parkston	1	Sullivan County	12758	
Parksville	1	Sullivan County	12768	
Park Terrace	1	Broome County	13903	
Park Village	1	Niagara County	14120	
Parkville	1	Kings County	11204	
Parkway	1	Bronx County	10462	
Parma	1	Monroe County		
Parma Center	1	Monroe County	14468	
Parma Corners	1	Monroe County	14559	
Parson Farms	1	Onondaga County	13031	
Parson Mill	1	Lewis County		
Parsons Beach	1	Queens County		
Partello Corners	1	Cayuga County		
Partlow	1	Hamilton County		
Pastime Park	1	Seneca County	14456	
Pataukunk	1	Ulster County	12446	
Patchin	1	Erie County	14025	
Patchin	1	New York County	10011	
Patchinville	1	Steuben County	14572	
Patchogue	1	Suffolk County	11772	
Patchogue Highlands	1	Suffolk County	11772	
Patent	1	Otsego County	13348	
Patria	1	Schoharie County	12187	
Patroon	1	Albany County	12211	
Pattens Mills	1	Washington County		
Patterson	1	Bronx County		
Patterson	1	Putnam County	12563	
Patterson	1	Putnam County		
Patterson Hamlet	1	Putnam County		
Pattersonville	1	Schenectady County	12137	
Pattersonville-Rotterdam Junction	1	Schenectady County		
Paul Smiths	1	Franklin County	12970	
Paul Smiths Easy Street	1	Franklin County		
Pavilion	1	Genesee County	14525	
Pavilion	1	Genesee County		
Pavilion Center	1	Genesee County	14525	
Pawling	1	Dutchess County	12564	
Pawling	1	Dutchess County		
Payne Beach	1	Monroe County	14468	
Paynesville	1	Allegany County	14897	
Peabrook	1	Delaware County	12760	
Peach Lake	2	Putnam County	10509	
Peach Lake	2	Westchester County	10509	
Peakville	1	Delaware County	13756	
Pearl Creek	1	Wyoming County	14591	
Pearl River	1	Rockland County	10965	
Peas Eddy	1	Delaware County		
Peasleeville	1	Clinton County	12985	
Peat Corners	1	Oswego County	13036	
Pebble Beach	1	Livingston County	14480	
Peck Hill	1	Onondaga County		
Peck Slip	1	New York County	10038	
Pecksport	1	Madison County		
Pecksville	1	Dutchess County	12531	
Pecktown	1	Otsego County		
Peconic	1	Suffolk County	11958	
Peekamoose	1	Ulster County		
Peekskill	1	Westchester County	10566	
Pekin	1	Niagara County	14132	
Pekin	1	Oswego County		
Pelham	1	Westchester County	10803	
Pelham	1	Westchester County		
Pelham Manor	1	Westchester County	10803	
Pelham Parkway	1	Bronx County	10462	
Pellets Island	1	Orange County	10958	
Pells	1	Essex County		
Pember Corners	1	Oswego County		
Pembroke	1	Genesee County	14036	
Pembroke	1	Genesee County		
Pembroke Center	1	Genesee County		
Penataquit	1	Suffolk County	11706	
Pendleton	1	Niagara County	14094	
Pendleton	1	Niagara County		
Pendleton Center	1	Niagara County	14094	
Penelope	1	Broome County		
Penfield	1	Monroe County	14526	
Penfield	1	Monroe County		
Penfield Center	1	Monroe County		
Pennellville	1	Oswego County	13132	
Penn Yan	1	Yates County	14527	
Penny Bridge	1	Queens County		
Peoria	1	Wyoming County	14525	
Perch River	1	Jefferson County	13634	
Perinton	1	Monroe County		
Perkins Corner	1	Madison County		
Perkinsville	1	Steuben County	14529	
Perry	1	Wyoming County	14530	
Perry	1	Wyoming County		
Perry Center	1	Wyoming County	14530	
Perry City	1	Schuyler County	14886	
Perry Mills	1	Clinton County	12919	
Perrysburg	1	Cattaraugus County	14129	
Perrysburg	1	Cattaraugus County		
Perryville	1	Madison County	13133	
Persia	1	Cattaraugus County		
Persia	1	Cattaraugus County		
Persons Corners	1	Wyoming County		
Perth	1	Fulton County	12010	
Perth	1	Fulton County		
Peru	1	Clinton County	12972	
Peru	1	Clinton County		
Peru	1	Onondaga County	13112	
Peruton	1	Tompkins County		
Peruville	1	Tompkins County	13073	
Peterboro	1	Madison County	13134	
Petersburg	1	Rensselaer County	12138	
Petersburgh	1	Rensselaer County		
Petersburg Junction	1	Rensselaer County		
Peters Corners	1	Erie County		
Peters Corners	1	Fulton County		
Peter Stuyvesant	1	New York County	10009	
Peth	1	Cattaraugus County	14741	
Petries Corners	1	Lewis County	13367	
Petrolia	1	Allegany County	14895	
Pharsalia	1	Chenango County	13758	
Pharsalia	1	Chenango County		
Phelps	1	Ontario County	14532	
Phelps	1	Ontario County		
Phelps Junction	1	Ontario County		
Philadelphia	1	Jefferson County	13673	
Philadelphia	1	Jefferson County		
Philipse Manor	1	Westchester County	10591	
Philipstown	1	Putnam County		
Phillipsburg	1	Orange County	10940	
Phillips Creek	1	Allegany County	14813	
Phillips Mill	1	Chautauqua County	14712	
Phillipsport	1	Sullivan County	12769	
Philmont	1	Columbia County	12565	
Philwold	1	Sullivan County		
Phoenicia	1	Ulster County	12464	
Phoenix	1	Oswego County	13135	
Phoenix Mills	1	Otsego County	13326	
Picketts Corners	1	Clinton County	12981	
Pickettville	1	St. Lawrence County	13672	
Piercefield	1	St. Lawrence County	12973	
Piercefield	1	St. Lawrence County		
Pierces Corner	1	St. Lawrence County	13642	
Pierceville	1	Madison County	13334	
Piermont	1	Rockland County	10968	
Pierrepont	1	St. Lawrence County	13617	
Pierrepont	1	St. Lawrence County		
Pierrepont Manor	1	Jefferson County	13674	
Pierstown	1	Otsego County	13326	
Piffard	1	Livingston County	14533	
Pike	1	Wyoming County	14130	
Pike	1	Wyoming County		
Pike Five Corners	1	Wyoming County	14024	
Pikeville	1	Allegany County		
Pilgrim	1	Bronx County	10461	
Pilgrim Corners	1	Orange County	10940	
Pilgrimport	1	Wayne County	14489	
Pilgrim State Hospital	1	Suffolk County		
Pillar Point	1	Jefferson County	13634	
Pilot Knob	1	Washington County	12844	
Pinckney	1	Lewis County		
Pindars Corners	1	Delaware County		
Pine	1	Albany County	12203	
Pine	1	Oneida County		
Pine Aire	1	Suffolk County	11717	
Pinebrook	1	Westchester County		
Pinebrook Heights	1	Westchester County		
Pine Bush	1	Orange County	12566	
Pine Bush	1	Ulster County		
Pine City	1	Chemung County	14871	
Pine Corners	1	Yates County		
Pine Creek	1	Schuyler County		
Pine Crest	1	Oneida County	13440	
Pine Grove	1	Lewis County	13343	
Pine Grove	1	Onondaga County		
Pine Grove	1	St. Lawrence County		
Pine Grove	1	Schenectady County		
Pine Grove	1	Schoharie County		
Pinegrove Park	1	Albany County	12212	
Pine Hill	1	Erie County	14225	
Pine Hill	1	Oneida County	13471	
Pine Hill	1	Ulster County	12465	
Pine Hollow	1	Cayuga County		
Pinehurst	1	Erie County	14085	
Pine Island	1	Orange County	10969	
Pine Lake	1	Fulton County	12032	
Pinelawn	1	Suffolk County	11743	
Pine Meadows	1	Oswego County	13302	
Pine Neck	1	Suffolk County	11963	
Pine Neck-West Tiana	1	Suffolk County	11946	
Pine Plains	1	Dutchess County	12567	
Pine Plains	1	Dutchess County		
Pine Ridge	1	Albany County	12203	
Pine Ridge Estates	1	Westchester County	10573	
Pinesville	1	Delaware County	13856	
Pine Tavern	1	Livingston County		
Pine Valley	1	Chemung County	14872	
Pine Valley	1	Suffolk County	11901	
Pineville	1	Oswego County	13302	
Pine Woods	1	Madison County	13310	
Pioneer	1	Saratoga County	12020	
Piseco	1	Hamilton County	12139	
Pitcairn	1	St. Lawrence County	13648	
Pitcairn	1	St. Lawrence County		
Pitcher	1	Chenango County	13136	
Pitcher	1	Chenango County		
Pitcher Hill	1	Onondaga County	13212	
Pitcher Springs	1	Chenango County		
Pitt	1	New York County	10002	
Pittsburg & Lehigh Junction	1	Monroe County		
Pittsfield	1	Otsego County	13411	
Pittsfield	1	Otsego County		
Pittsford	1	Monroe County	14534	
Pittsford	1	Monroe County		
Pittstown	1	Rensselaer County	12094	
Pittstown	1	Rensselaer County		
Plainedge	1	Nassau County	11756	
Plainfield	1	Otsego County		
Plainfield Center	1	Otsego County	13491	
Plainview	1	Nassau County	11803	
Plainville	1	Onondaga County	13137	
Plandome	1	Nassau County	11030	
Plandome Heights	1	Nassau County	11030	
Plandome Manor	1	Nassau County	11030	
Planetarium	1	New York County	10024	
Plantz Corners	1	Oswego County		
Plasterville	1	Chenango County		
Plato	1	Cattaraugus County	14171	
Platte Clove	1	Greene County	12427	
Plattekill	1	Ulster County	12568	
Plattekill	1	Ulster County		
Platten	1	Orleans County	14098	
Plattsburgh	1	Clinton County	12901	
Plattsburgh	1	Clinton County		
Plattsburgh Air Force Base	1	Clinton County	12903	
Plattsburgh West	1	Clinton County		
Plaza	1	Queens County	11101	
Pleasant Brook	1	Otsego County	13320	
Pleasantdale	1	Rensselaer County	12182	
Pleasant Hill	1	Broome County		
Pleasant Plains	1	Dutchess County	12580	
Pleasant Plains	1	Richmond County	10309	
Pleasant Point	1	Oswego County	13126	
Pleasant Ridge	1	Dutchess County		
Pleasant Ridge Corners	1	Clinton County		
Pleasantside	1	Westchester County		
Pleasant Valley (town)	1	Dutchess County	12569	
Pleasant Valley (hamlet)	1	Dutchess County		
Pleasant Valley	1	Oneida County	13480	
Pleasant Valley	1	Steuben County	14810	
Pleasant Valley	1	Sullivan County		
Pleasant Valley	1	Tompkins County		
Pleasantville	1	Chautauqua County		
Pleasantville	1	Westchester County	10570	
Plessis	1	Jefferson County	13675	
Pletchers Corners	1	Niagara County		
Plumbrook	1	St. Lawrence County	13667	
Plum Island	1	Suffolk County	11944	
Plutarch	1	Ulster County		
Plymouth	1	Chenango County	13832	
Plymouth	1	Chenango County		
Pocantico Hills	1	Westchester County	10591	
Podunk	1	Tompkins County		
Poestenkill	1	Rensselaer County	12140	
Poestenkill	1	Rensselaer County		
Point au Rouche	1	Clinton County	12901	
Point Breeze	1	Orleans County	14477	
Point Chautauqua	1	Chautauqua County	14728	
Point Lookout	1	Nassau County	11569	
Point O' Woods	1	Suffolk County	11706	
Point Peninsula	1	Jefferson County	13693	
Point Pleasant	1	Chautauqua County		
Point Pleasant	1	Monroe County	14622	
Point Rochester	1	Ontario County	14512	
Point Rock	1	Oneida County	13471	
Point Stockholm	1	Chautauqua County		
Point Vivian	1	Jefferson County	13607	
Poland	1	Chautauqua County		
Poland	1	Herkimer County	13431	
Poland Center	1	Chautauqua County	14747	
Polkville	1	Chenango County		
Polkville	1	Cortland County	13101	
Polkville	1	Onondaga County		
Pomfret	1	Chautauqua County		
Pomona	1	Rockland County	10970	
Pomona Heights	1	Rockland County	10901	
Pomonok	1	Queens County	11365	
Pompey	1	Onondaga County	13138	
Pompey	1	Onondaga County		
Pompey Center	1	Onondaga County	13104	
Ponck Hockie	1	Ulster County	12401	
Pond Eddy	1	Sullivan County	12770	
Pond Settlement	1	St. Lawrence County	13648	
Ponquogue	1	Suffolk County	11946	
Pontiac	1	Erie County		
Poolsburg	1	Columbia County		
Poolville	1	Madison County	13432	
Poospatuck Indian Reservation	1	Suffolk County	11950	
Pope	1	Cattaraugus County		
Pope Mills	1	St. Lawrence County	13654	
Popes Ravine	1	Broome County		
Poplar Beach	1	Seneca County	14541	
Poplar Ridge	1	Cayuga County	13139	
Poquott	1	Suffolk County	11733	
Porcaville	1	Franklin County		
Portage	1	Livingston County	14846	
Portage	1	Livingston County		
Portageville	1	Wyoming County	14536	
Port Authority	1	New York County	10011	
Port Ben	1	Ulster County	12489	
Port Byron	1	Cayuga County	13140	
Port Chester	1	Westchester County	10573	
Port Crane	1	Broome County	13833	
Port Dickinson	1	Broome County	13901	
Port Douglass	1	Essex County		
Porter	1	Niagara County		
Porter	1	Washington County		
Porter Center	1	Niagara County	14131	
Porter Corners	1	Saratoga County	12859	
Porterville	1	Erie County	14052	
Port Ewen	1	Ulster County	12466	
Port Gibson	1	Ontario County	14537	
Port Henry	1	Essex County	12974	
Port Ivory	1	Richmond County		
Port Jefferson	1	Suffolk County	11777	
Port Jefferson	1	Suffolk County		
Port Jefferson Station	1	Suffolk County	11776	
Port Jervis	1	Orange County	12771	
Port Kent	1	Essex County	12975	
Portland	1	Chautauqua County	14769	
Portland	1	Chautauqua County		
Portland	1	Tompkins County		
Portland Point	1	Tompkins County		
Portlandville	1	Otsego County	13834	
Port Leyden	1	Lewis County	13433	
Port Morris	1	Bronx County		
Port Ontario	1	Oswego County	13142	
Port Orange	1	Orange County		
Port Richmond	1	Richmond County	10302	
Portville	1	Cattaraugus County	14770	
Portville	1	Cattaraugus County		
Port Washington	1	Nassau County	11050	
Port Washington North	1	Nassau County	11050	
Postal Concentration Center	1	New York County	11101	
Post Creek	1	Chemung County	14812	
Potsdam	1	St. Lawrence County	13676	
Potsdam	1	St. Lawrence County		
Potter	1	Yates County	14527	
Potter	1	Yates County		
Potter Hill	1	Rensselaer County		
Potter Hollow	1	Albany County	12469	
Pottersville	1	Warren County	12860	
Potterville	1	Ulster County		
Pouch Terminal	1	Richmond County		
Poughkeepsie	1	Dutchess County	12601	03
Poughkeepsie	1	Dutchess County		
Poughquag	1	Dutchess County	12570	
Pound Ridge	1	Westchester County	10576	
Pound Ridge	1	Westchester County		
Pratt	1	Kings County	11205	
Pratt Corners	1	Cortland County		
Prattham	1	Oswego County		
Pratts	1	Madison County		
Prattsburgh	1	Steuben County	14873	
Prattsburgh	1	Steuben County		
Pratts Hollow	1	Madison County	13434	
Prattsville	1	Greene County	12468	
Prattsville	1	Greene County		
Preble	1	Cortland County	13141	
Preble	1	Cortland County		
Pre-emption	1	Ontario County		
Prendergast Point	1	Chautauqua County	14757	
Presho	1	Steuben County	14858	
Preston	1	Chenango County	13830	
Preston	1	Chenango County		
Preston Center	1	Chenango County		
Preston Hollow	1	Albany County	12469	
Preston-Potter Hollow	1	Albany County		
Price Home	1	Tioga County		
Prince	1	New York County	10012	
Prince's Bay	1	Richmond County	10309	
Princetown	1	Schenectady County	12056	
Princetown	1	Schenectady County		
Progress	1	Fulton County	12078	
Prospect	1	Oneida County	13435	
Prospect Heights	1	Rensselaer County	12144	
Prospect Hill	1	Orange County		
Prospect Hill	1	Saratoga County	12188	
Prospect Park West	1	Kings County	11215	
Protection	1	Erie County	14080	
Providence	1	Saratoga County		
Prussian Settlement	1	Oneida County		
Puckerville	1	Madison County		
Pudding Hollow	1	Essex County		
Pulaski	1	Oswego County	13142	
Pulteney	1	Steuben County	14874	
Pulteney	1	Steuben County		
Pultneyville	1	Wayne County	14538	
Pulvers	1	Columbia County		
Pulvers Corners	1	Dutchess County	12567	
Pumpkin Hill	1	Genesee County	14422	
Pumpkin Hollow	1	Columbia County		
Pumpkin Hollow	1	Hamilton County		
Pumpkin Hook	1	Washington County		
Punkshire Corners	1	Wyoming County		
Purchase	1	Westchester County	10577	
Purdys	1	Westchester County	10578	
Purdys Grove	1	Westchester County		
Purdys Mill	1	Clinton County	12910	
Purdy Station	1	Westchester County	10578	
Purling	1	Greene County	12470	
Putnam	1	Washington County		
Putnam	1	Washington County		
Putnam Lake	1	Putnam County	10509	
Putnam Station	1	Washington County	12861	
Putnam Valley	1	Putnam County	10579	
Pyrites	1	St. Lawrence County	13677	
