= Tazcol Peak =

Mountain in Alaska, United States

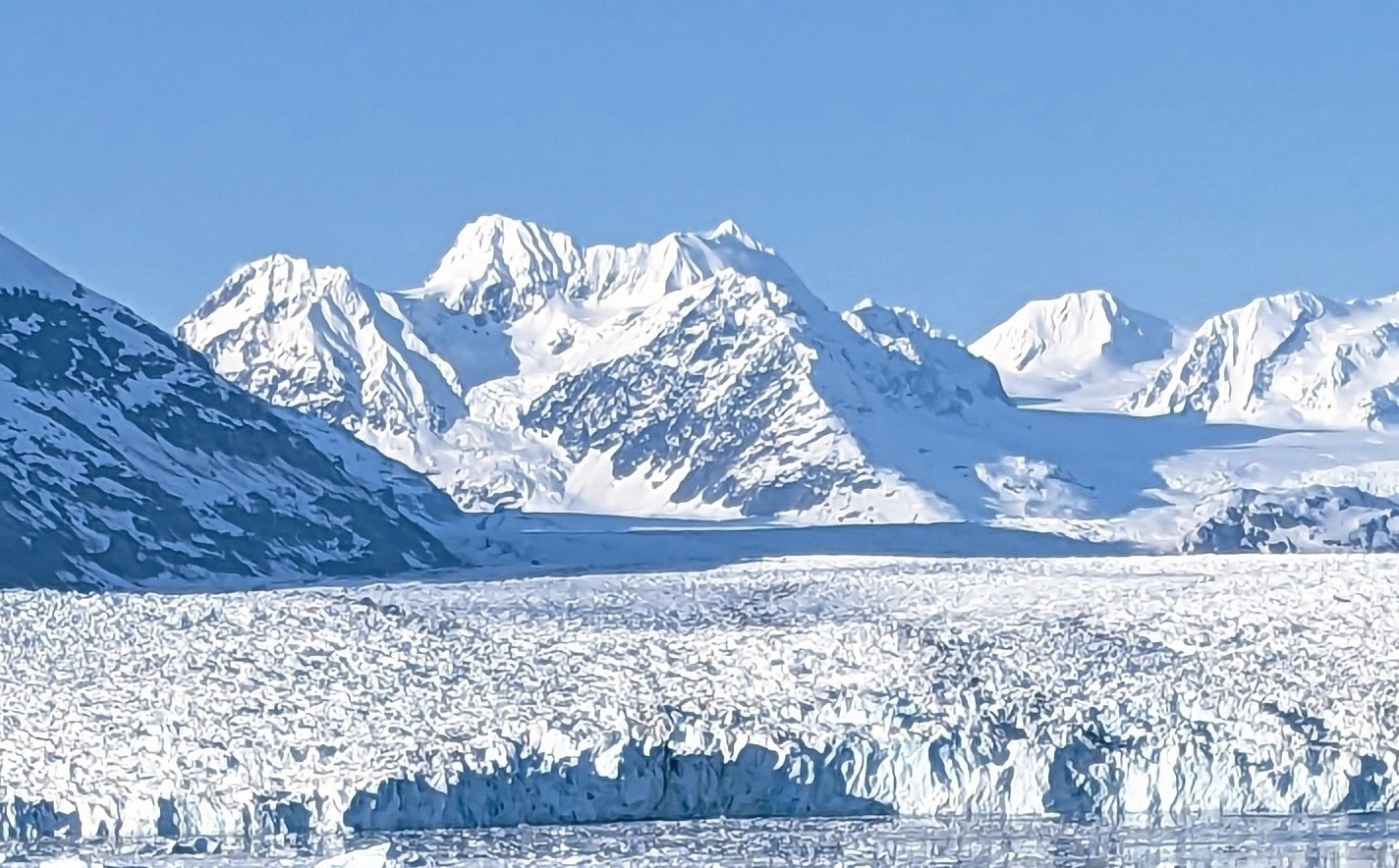
- Southwest aspect of Tazcol/Lindita; Tazcol Peak slightly left of center

Highest point
- Elevation: 7,850 ft (2,393 m)
- Prominence: 700 ft (213 m)
- Parent peak: Lindita Peak (7,910 ft)
- Isolation: 0.72 mi (1.16 km)
- Coordinates: 61°20′50″N 146°37′38″W

Geography
- Location within Alaska
- Location: Copper River Census Area
- Country: United States
- State: Alaska
- Protected area: Chugach National Forest
- Parent range: Chugach Mountains
- Topo map: USGS Valdez B-8

Tazcol Peak is a 7,850-foot-elevation (2,393-meter) mountain summit located 18 miles (29 km) north-northwest of Valdez in the U.S. state of Alaska. This remote glaciated mountain is set in the Chugach Mountains on land managed by Chugach National Forest. Precipitation runoff from the mountain drains south to Prince William Sound and north to Tazlina Lake → Tazlina River → Copper River. Topographic relief is significant as the summit rises 4,350 feet (1,326 m) above the East Branch of the Columbia Glacier in 1.4 mile (2.25 km). The peak's name was applied in 1959 by mountaineer and glaciologist Lawrence E. Nielsen (1917–1992), and the toponym was officially adopted in 1965 by the U.S. Board on Geographic Names. The word "Tazcol" is a portmanteau blending the names of the Tazlina Glacier and Columbia Glacier which flow from this mountain's north and south slopes respectively.

== Climate ==
Based on the Köppen climate classification, Tazcol Peak is located in a subarctic climate zone with long, cold, snowy winters, and cool summers. Weather systems coming off the Gulf of Alaska are forced upwards by the Chugach Mountains (orographic lift), causing heavy precipitation in the form of rainfall and snowfall. Winter temperatures can drop below −10 °F with wind chill factors below −20 °F. This climate supports the Tazlina and Columbia Glaciers surrounding this mountain. The months May through June offer the most favorable weather for climbing or viewing.

== See also ==
- List of mountain peaks of Alaska
- Geography of Alaska
