= Lindita Peak =

Mountain summit in Alaska, US

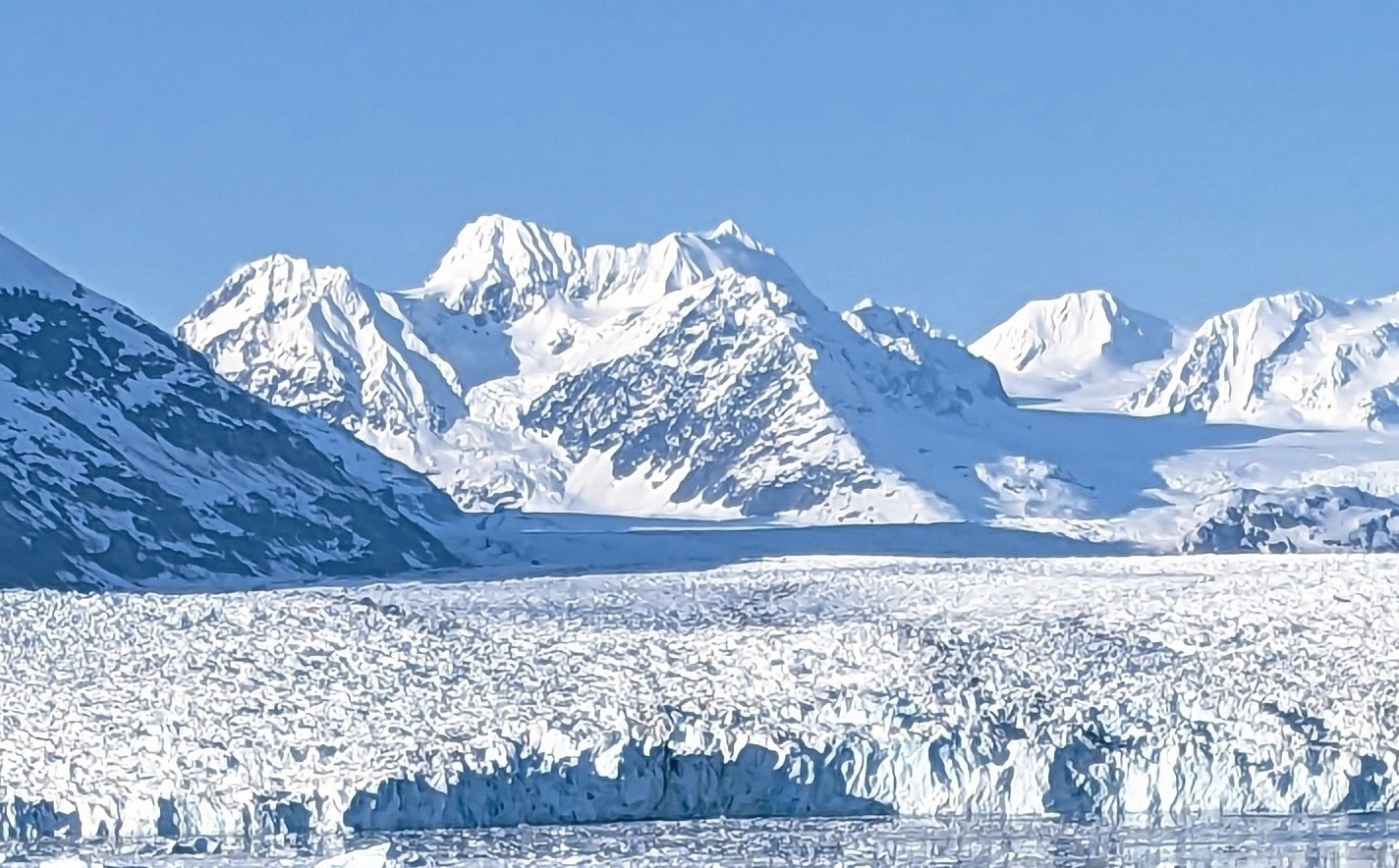
- Southwest aspect centered in the distance

Highest point
- Elevation: 7,910 ft (2,411 m)
- Prominence: 2,060 ft (628 m)
- Parent peak: Mount Shouplina (8,531 ft)
- Isolation: 3.97 mi (6.39 km)
- Coordinates: 61°20′34″N 146°36′27″W

Geography
- Location within Alaska
- Location: Copper River Census Area
- Country: United States
- State: Alaska
- Protected area: Chugach National Forest
- Parent range: Chugach Mountains
- Topo map: USGS Valdez B-7

Climbing
- First ascent: 1977

Lindita Peak is a 7,910-foot-elevation (2,411-meter) mountain summit located 17 miles (27 km) north-northwest of Valdez in the U.S. state of Alaska. Lindita is the highest peak at the head of the Tazlina Glacier when viewed from the Glenn Highway at Mile 156 near the Tazlina Glacier Lodge. This remote glaciated mountain is set in the Chugach Mountains on land managed by Chugach National Forest. Precipitation runoff from the mountain drains south to Prince William Sound and north to Tazlina Lake → Tazlina River → Copper River. Topographic relief is significant as the summit rises 2,400 feet (732 m) above the East Branch of the Columbia Glacier in 0.4 mile (0.64 km). The mountain's name Lindita, meaning "little beauty" in Spanish, was applied in 1955 by mountaineer and glaciologist Lawrence E. Nielsen (1917–1992), and the toponym was officially adopted in 1965 by the U.S. Board on Geographic Names. The first ascent of the summit was made on July 1, 1977, by Lawrence E. Nielsen, Halford Joiner, Tom Lamb, and Dr. Randall Travis via the northeast face and the north-facing knife-edged ridge from the Tazlina Glacier.

== Climate ==
Based on the Köppen climate classification, Lindita Peak is located in a subarctic climate zone with long, cold, snowy winters, and cool summers. Weather systems coming off the Gulf of Alaska are forced upwards by the Chugach Mountains (orographic lift), causing heavy precipitation in the form of rainfall and snowfall. Winter temperatures can drop below −10 °F with wind chill factors below −20 °F. This climate supports the Tazlina and Columbia Glaciers surrounding this mountain. The months May through June offer the most favorable weather for climbing or viewing.

== See also ==
- List of mountain peaks of Alaska
- Geography of Alaska
