= Tazlina Tower =

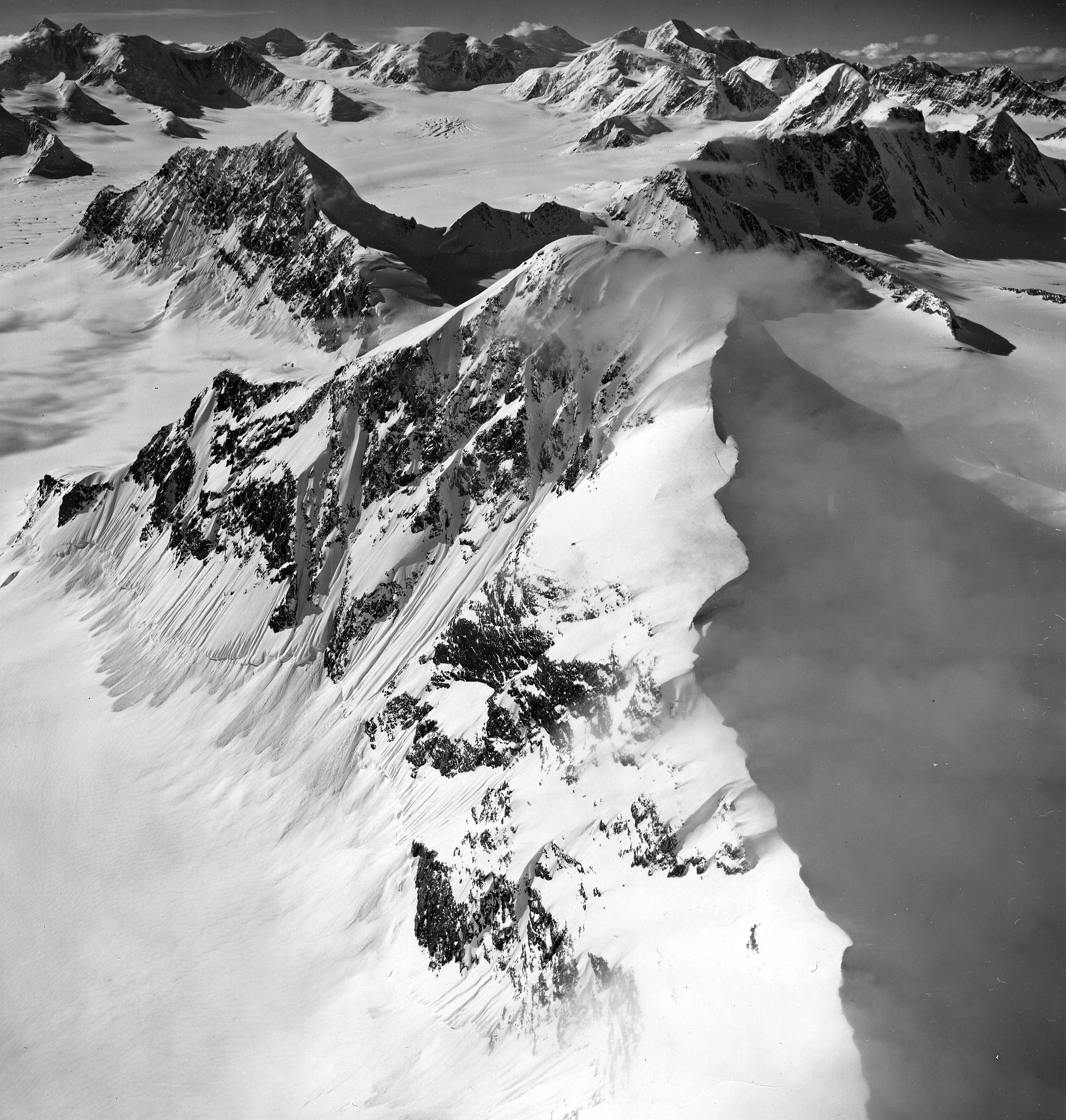
- Aerial view from the west

Highest point
- Elevation: 8,350 ft (2,550 m)
- Prominence: 1,700 ft (520 m)
- Parent peak: Mount Powder Top
- Isolation: 5.2 mi (8.4 km)
- Coordinates: 61°23′17″N 146°45′45″W

Geography
- Location within Alaska
- Interactive map of Tazlina Tower
- Location: Chugach National Forest; Copper River Census Area; Alaska, United States
- Parent range: Chugach Mountains
- Topo map: USGS Valdez B-8

Climbing
- Easiest route: Mountaineering

Tazlina Tower is an 8,350-foot (2,545 m) elevation glaciated summit located 26 mi (42 km) northwest of Valdez in the Chugach Mountains of the U.S. state of Alaska. This remote mountain is situated 5.5 mi (9 km) southeast of Mount Powder Top, and 5.7 mi (9 km) northeast of Pilot Peak, near the head of Tazlina Glacier, on land managed by Chugach National Forest. Tazlina Tower was named in association with the glacier, in 1959, by Lawrence E. Nielsen of the Chugach Mountains Expedition, which was sponsored by the Arctic Institute of North America. In turn, the glacier, Tazlina Lake, and Tazlina River are traced to the Ahtna language, "tezlina", meaning "swift river." The mountain's name was officially adopted in 1965 by the U.S. Board on Geographic Names.

== Climate ==
Based on the Köppen climate classification, Tazlina Tower is located in a subarctic climate zone with long, cold, snowy winters, and mild summers. Weather systems coming off the Gulf of Alaska are forced upwards by the Chugach Mountains (orographic lift), causing heavy precipitation in the form of rainfall and snowfall. Temperatures can drop below −20 °C with wind chill factors below −30 °C. This climate supports the Tazlina Glacier and the immense Columbia Glacier surrounding this mountain. The months May through June offer the most favorable weather for climbing or viewing.

== Gallery ==
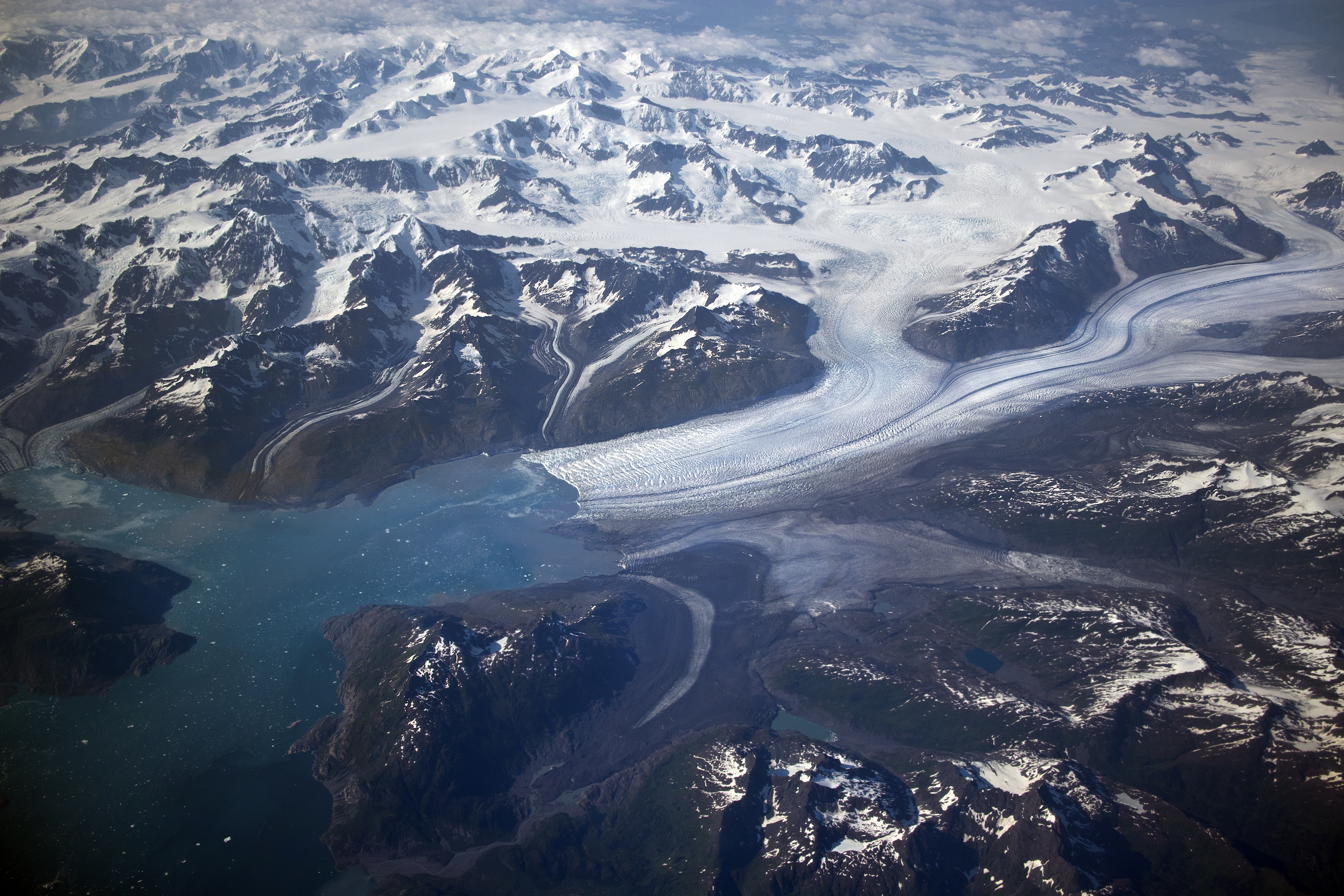
Tazlina Tower in upper right (see file annotations)

== See also ==
- List of mountain peaks of Alaska
- Geography of Alaska
