= Snyder Creek =

Snyder Creek may refer to:

- Snyder Creek (Iowa River tributary), a stream in Iowa
- Snyder Creek (New York), a stream in New York
