= Pilot Peak =

Pilot Peak may refer to:

- Pilot Peak (Alaska) in Alaska, United States
- Pilot Peak (Nevada) in Nevada, United States
- Pilot Peak (Wyoming) in Wyoming, United States

== See also ==
- Pilot Butte (disambiguation)
- Pilot Hill (disambiguation)
- Pilot Knob (disambiguation)
- Pilot Mountain (disambiguation)
