= Pilot Knob =

Pilot Knob may refer to:

== Places in the United States ==
- Pilot Knob, Missouri
- Pilot Knob, New York
- Pilot Knob, Texas
- Pilot Knob, Wisconsin
- Pilot Knob Station, a former stage station of the Butterfeild Overland Mail near Andrade, California
- Pilot Knob Township, Washington County, Illinois

== Landforms and parks ==
- Pilot Knob (Fresno County, California)
- Pilot Knob (Imperial County, California)
- Pilot Knob (Colorado), a summit in the San Juan Mountains of Colorado
- Pilot Knob, a high mountain summit in the Elkhead Mountains of Colorado
- Pilot Knob State Park, near Forest City, Iowa
- Pilot Knob State Nature Preserve, Powell County, Kentucky
- Oheyawahi-Pilot Knob, on the National Register of Historic Places listings in Dakota County, Minnesota
- Pilot Knob (Iron County, Missouri), Iron, Missouri
- Pilot Knob (Austin, Texas)
- Pilot Knob Mountain, a tank gunnery range at Fort Hood, Texas

== See also ==
- Battle of Pilot Knob, in Missouri
- Camp Pilot Knob, a U.S. Army camp in Riverside County, California
- Pilot Butte (disambiguation)
- Pilot Hill (disambiguation)
- Pilot Mountain (disambiguation)
- Pilot Peak (disambiguation)
