= Mount Shouplina =

Mountain in Alaska, United States

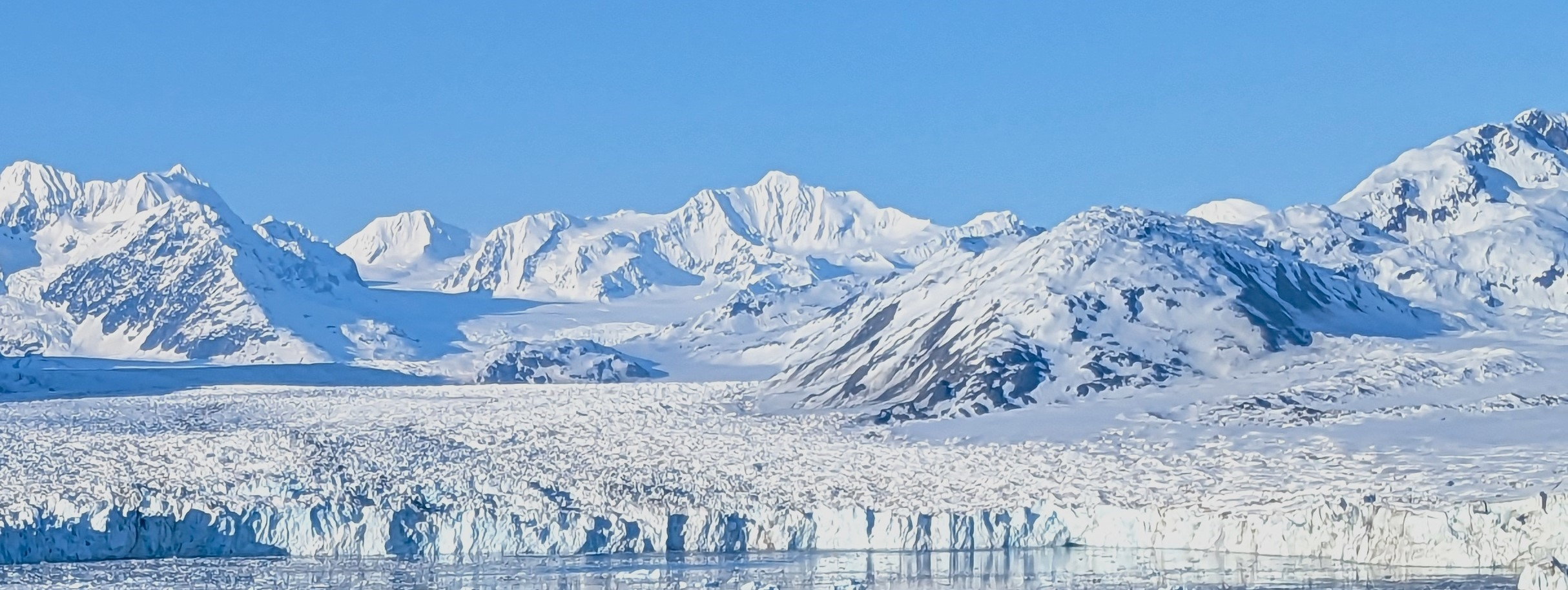
- Southwest aspect centered in the distance

Highest point
- Elevation: 8,531 ft (2,600 m)
- Prominence: 3,160 ft (963 m)
- Parent peak: Mount Powder Top (9,140 ft)
- Isolation: 13.81 mi (22.23 km)
- Coordinates: 61°20′20″N 146°29′14″W

Geography
- Location within Alaska
- Interactive map of Mount Shouplina
- Location: Copper River Census Area
- Country: United States
- State: Alaska
- Protected area: Chugach National Forest
- Parent range: Chugach Mountains
- Topo map: USGS Valdez B-7

Climbing
- First ascent: March 1985

Mount Shouplina is an 8,531-foot-elevation (2,600-meter) mountain summit located 18 miles (29 km) north-northwest of Valdez in the U.S. state of Alaska. This remote glaciated mountain is set in the Chugach Mountains on land managed by Chugach National Forest. Precipitation runoff from the mountain drains south to Prince William Sound and north to Tazlina Lake → Tazlina River → Copper River. Topographic relief is significant as the summit rises 2,100 feet (640 m) above the East Branch Columbia Glacier in 0.4 mile (0.64 km). The first ascent of the summit was made in 1985 by John Weiland, Matt Kinney, and Bob Shelton. The mountain was named in 1959 by mountaineer Lawrence E. Nielsen and the toponym was officially adopted in 1965 by the U.S. Board on Geographic Names. The word "Shouplina" is a portmanteau blending the names of the Shoup Glacier and Tazlina Glacier which flow from this mountain's south and north slopes respectively.

== Climate ==
Based on the Köppen climate classification, Mount Shouplina is located in a subarctic climate zone with long, cold, snowy winters, and cool summers. Weather systems coming off the Gulf of Alaska are forced upwards by the Chugach Mountains (orographic lift), causing heavy precipitation in the form of rainfall and snowfall. Winter temperatures can drop below −10 °F with wind chill factors below −20 °F. This climate supports the Tazlina, Shoup, Valdez, and Columbia Glaciers surrounding this mountain. The months May through June offer the most favorable weather for climbing or viewing.

== See also ==
- List of mountain peaks of Alaska
- Geography of Alaska
