= Petrolia =

Petrolia may refer to:

United States

- Petrolia, New York
- Petrolia, California
- Petrolia, Kansas
- Petrolia, Pennsylvania
- Petrolia, Texas
  - Petrolia Formation

Canada

- Petrolia, Ontario

Venezuela

- Petrolia del Tachira, first private oil company of Venezuela
