= Pilot Mountain =

Pilot Mountain may refer to:

- Pilot Mountain (Alberta), a mountain in the Canadian province of Alberta
- Pilot Mountain (British Columbia), a mountain in the Canadian province of British Columbia
- Pilot Mountain (North Carolina), a mountain in the U.S. state of North Carolina
- Pilot Mountain, North Carolina, a town in the U.S. state of North Carolina
- Pilot Mountain (Yukon), a mountain in the Yukon Territory of Canada

== See also ==
- Pilot Butte (disambiguation)
- Pilot Hill (disambiguation)
- Pilot Knob (disambiguation)
- Pilot Peak (disambiguation)
