= Marion Marsh Todd =

American author, lawyer, and economist

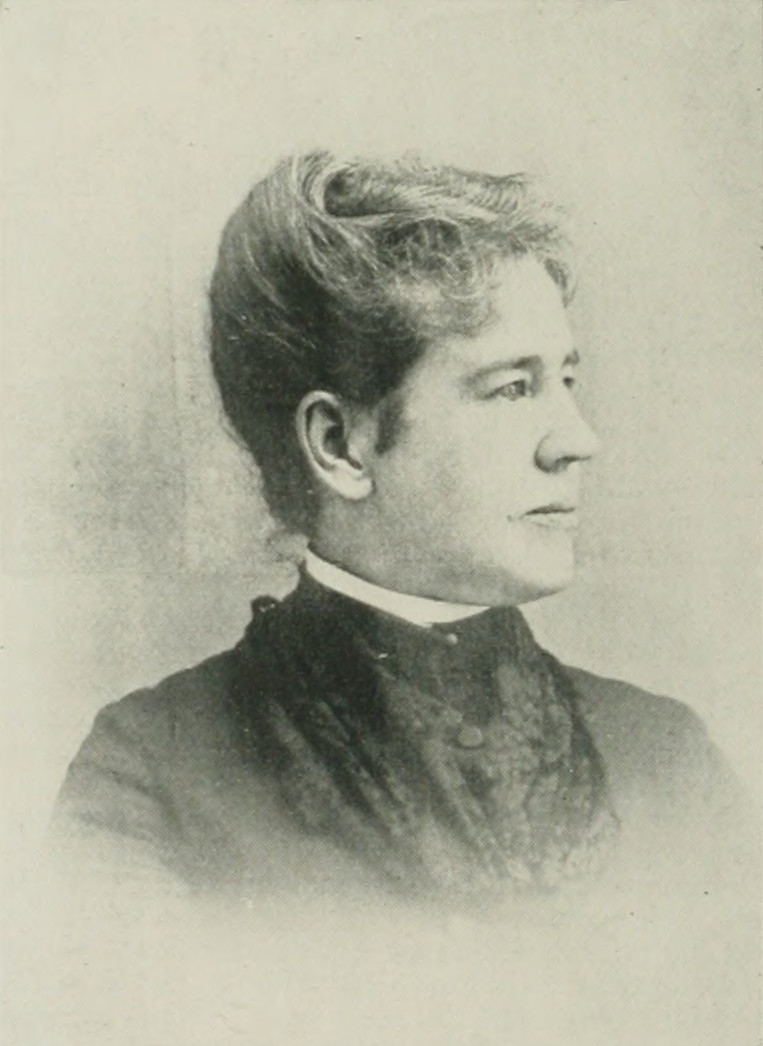
- Born: Marion Marsh; February 28, 1841; Plymouth, New York, U.S.
- Died: October 2, 1928 (aged 87)
- Education: Hastings Law College
- Occupations: Writer, lawyer
- Political party: Greenback Labor Party
- Spouse: Benjamin Todd (m. 1868–1879)

Marion Marsh Todd (February 28, 1841 – October 2, 1928) was an American author, lawyer and political economist. After her husband died in 1880, Todd ran for state attorney general with the Greenback Labor Party and joined the Knights of Labor General Assembly. She also authored political and romantic books including Prof. Goldwin Smith and His Satellites in Congress, Railways of Europe and America and Protective Tariff Delusions

== Early life ==
Todd was born on February 28, 1841, in Plymouth, New York. She was one of seven children and attended Ypsilanti State Normal School. Her father, Abner Kneeland Marsh, died when she was ten years old. After graduating from the Ypsilanti State Normal School, she began her career as a teacher.

== Career ==
Todd married Benjamin Todd in 1868 and they moved to California. She attended Hastings College of Law and practiced law in California before moving to Chicago. She was one of the first woman to pass the State Bar of California. As one of the first women to enrol at Hastings, Todd was classmates alongside activists Clara Shortridge Foltz and Laura de Force Gordon. She practiced law for three years in San Francisco.

After her husband's death, Todd ran for State Attorney General with the Greenback Labor Party. She led the Greenback Party in the election after receiving 1,109 votes but lost. Although she lost, Todd attended the first national anti-monopoly convention in Chicago as a delegate in 1893 and 1894. She eventually returned to the Midwest where she advocated for the Farmers' Alliance. In the mid-1880s, she joined the Knights of Labor in Michigan, and was sent as a delegate to the convention in Richmond, Virginia. In her book Protective Tariff Delusions, Todd focused on high tariffs. However, by 1890, she switched her focus to currency and corporate monopoly. She moved to Chicago where she became the editor of a reformer newspaper and then to Eaton Rapids, Michigan. She joined the Equity Club, a network of female lawyers.

While continuing her political activism, Todd also authored political and romantic books. In 1893, with the help of the chairman of the National Committee of the People's party, she published Railways of Europe and America: Or, Government Ownership. As well, in response to comments from Professor Goldwin Smith at Cornell University that was seen as anti-suffragist, Todd published Prof. Goldwin Smith and His Satellites in Congress.

== Selected publications ==
- Railways of Europe and America: Or, Government Ownership (1893)
- Prof. Goldwin Smith and His Satellites in Congress (1890)
- Railways of Europe and America
- Protective Tariff Delusions
- Claudia (1902)
