= Pilot Butte =

Pilot Butte may refer to:

- Pilot Butte, Saskatchewan, a town in Canada
- Pilot Butte (Oregon), an extinct volcano in the United States
- Pilot Butte (Wyoming), a butte in the United States
  - Camp Pilot Butte, a historic place in Wyoming associated with the Rock Springs massacre
  - Pilot Butte Dam, Wyoming, United States

== See also ==
- Pilot Hill (disambiguation)
- Pilot Knob (disambiguation)
- Pilot Mountain (disambiguation)
- Pilot Peak (disambiguation)
