= Pilot Hill =

Pilot Hill may refer to:

- Pilot Hill, California, an unincorporated community in El Dorado County, California, US
- Pilot Hill, Hampshire, the highest point of the county of Hampshire, UK
- Pilot Hill, Massachusetts, a hill on Martha's Vineyard, Massachusetts, US

== See also ==
- Pilot Butte (disambiguation)
- Pilot Knob (disambiguation)
- Pilot Mountain (disambiguation)
- Pilot Peak (disambiguation)
