= Lake Atna =

Prehistoric lake in Alaska

- Location within Alaska Location within North America

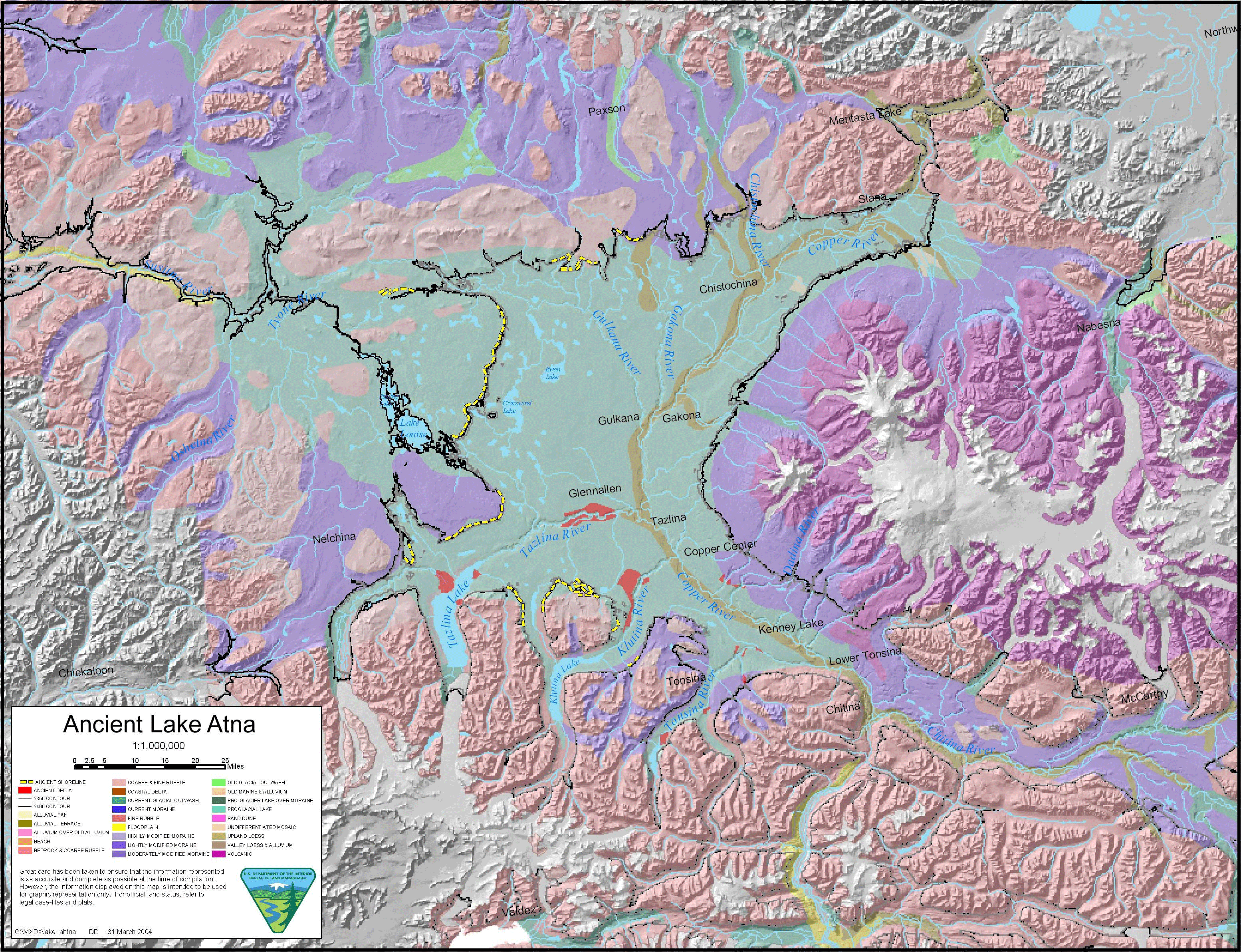
- Map showing one of the possible extents (pale green) of ancient Lake Atna
- Location: Southcentral Alaska
- Coordinates: 62°17′04″N 145°45′00″W
- Type: Proglacial lake
- Part of: Copper River Basin
- Primary outflows: Early: endorheic; Later: Matanuska River, Susitna River, Tok River, and Copper River depending on period.
- Surface area: 8,900–24,000 km^{2} (3,400–9,300 sq mi)
- Water volume: 2,300–6,000 km^{3} (550–1,440 cu mi)
- Surface elevation: 975 m (3,199 ft) (maximum)

Lake Atna (/ˈɑːtnə/; also known as Lake Ahtna) was a prehistoric proglacial lake that initially formed approximately 58 ka (thousand years ago) in the Copper River Basin, an area roughly centered around 245 km (152 mi) northeast of modern-day Anchorage, Alaska. The lake formed, and dispersed, during the Wisconsin glaciation. The lake existed in several forms, with several prominent shorelines observable in modern geology. At its greatest extent, the lake surface area was approximately half the size of modern-day Lake Ontario, and possibly much larger. The basin of the lake lay within an area bordered by the Alaska Range to the north, the Wrangell Mountains to the east, the Chugach Mountains to the south, and the Talkeetna Mountains to the west.

Lake Atna may have generated several of the largest ever glacial lake outburst floods. Old deposits from one of these floods may have added to the destruction caused by the 1964 Alaska earthquake.

== Discovery ==
In 1898, Frank Charles Schrader undertook a study of the Copper River Basin for the United States Geological Survey (USGS). Based on sedimentary evidence, he concluded that there was a possibility of a large body of standing water being responsible for the deposits and that this could have been an arm of the sea. Alongside A. C. Spencer in 1901, he concluded – contrary to his earlier hypothesis – that these deposits occurred only in limited areas. This conclusion was supported by Walter Curran Mendenhall in 1905, who had studied the Pleistocene deposits in the central region of the basin.

In 1954, Fred Howard Moffit noted that topographic conditions were favorable for the possibility of a large lake, but that specific evidence was lacking at that time. By 1957, geologists Oscar J. Ferrians and H.R. Schmoll concluded the basin had been resident to a large proglacial lake during the Wisconsin glaciation. The lake was named Lake Atna by geologist D. J. Nichols of the USGS in 1965.

== Geological history ==
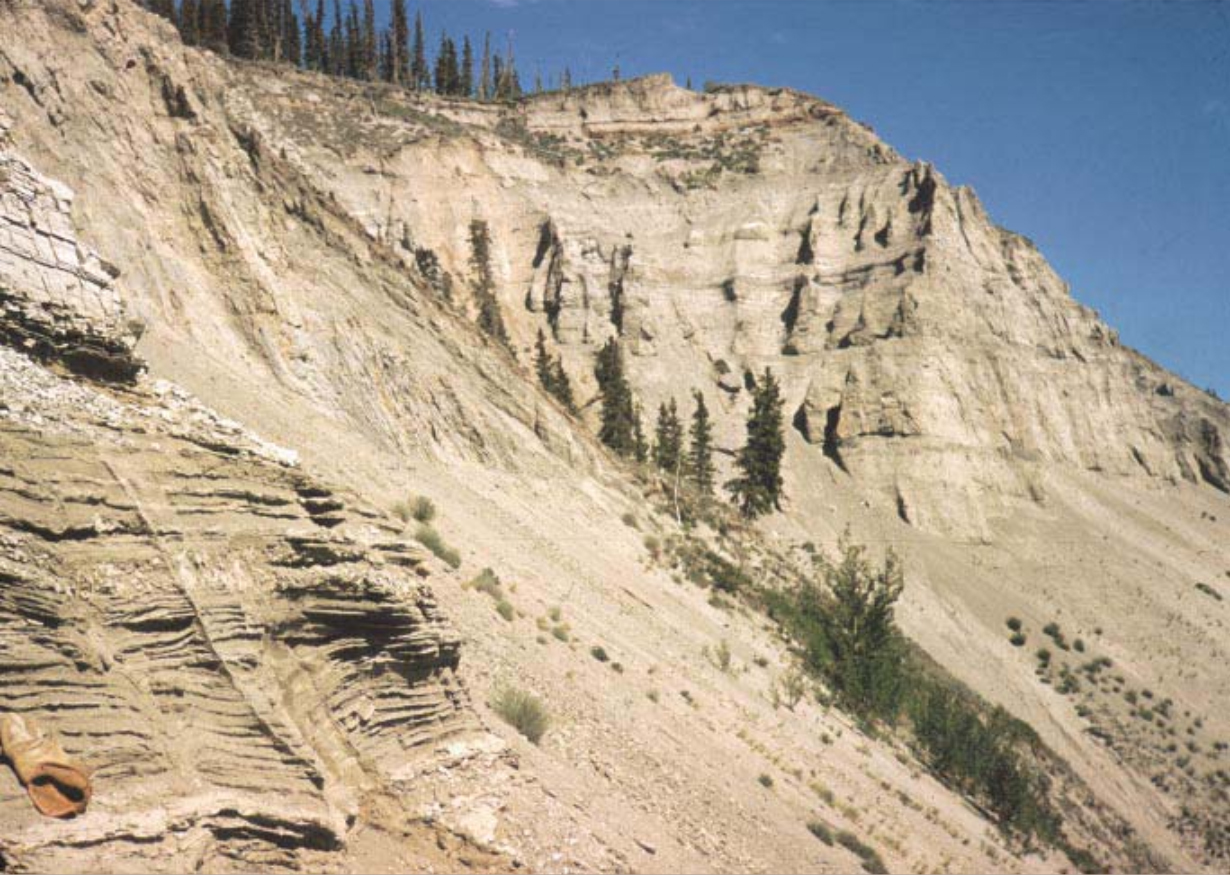
The bluffs near the confluence of the Gakona and Copper Rivers expose nearly 300 ft of the Quaternary lacustrine, alluvial, and glacial deposits that fill the Copper River Basin. Most of the section seen in this view consists of finely laminated to indistinctly bedded sand, silt, and clay, with or without coarser material, that was deposited in glacial Lake Atna.

During the Miocene Epoch, the region saw significant tectonic uplift through which the ancestral Copper River maintained its course. Sometime before 40 ka, the basin was free of water and ice, and covered in spruce forest. During the Wisconsin glaciation, a multitude of glaciers extended into and blocked drainage exits from the Copper River Basin. The lake formed at least as early as 58 ka, during the Pleistocene period as a result of glacial damming along the middle and lower valleys of the river, impounding the lake in the Copper River Basin.

The highest surface level the lake achieved was 975 m (3,199 ft), based on sedimentation in the northwestern area of the basin. Multiple strand lines exist in the basin indicating sustained lake levels at a maximum of 914 m (2,999 ft) above modern sea level and other lower levels including 750 m (2,460 ft), 700 m (2,300 ft), 580 m (1,900 ft), 550 m (1,800 ft) and 490 m (1,610 ft) above modern sea level. At its greatest extent, the lake surface area was approximately half the size of modern-day Lake Ontario, and possibly much larger.

During its early formation, the lake likely had no permanent outlet. The damming glaciers that created the lake became large enough that the lake was endorheic, though it may have periodically topped its glacial dams. The final draining and disappearance of the lake likely happened no later than approximately 9.4 ka through the Copper River Valley. Isostatic rebound effects of departing ice sheets and the draining of Lake Atna from the basin remain uncertain, as detailed study of the shorelines in the basin has not been conducted.

In 2006, John Jangala, an archaeologist with the Bureau of Land Management indicated that Lake Atna may have been a remnant of an earlier lake called Lake Susitna. This was contradicted by Michael Wiedmer in 2011 who stated that no evidence exists for an independent Lake Susitna. The detailed history of the lake and its extent over time is a highly complex problem, as further investigation is required.

=== Megaflood history ===
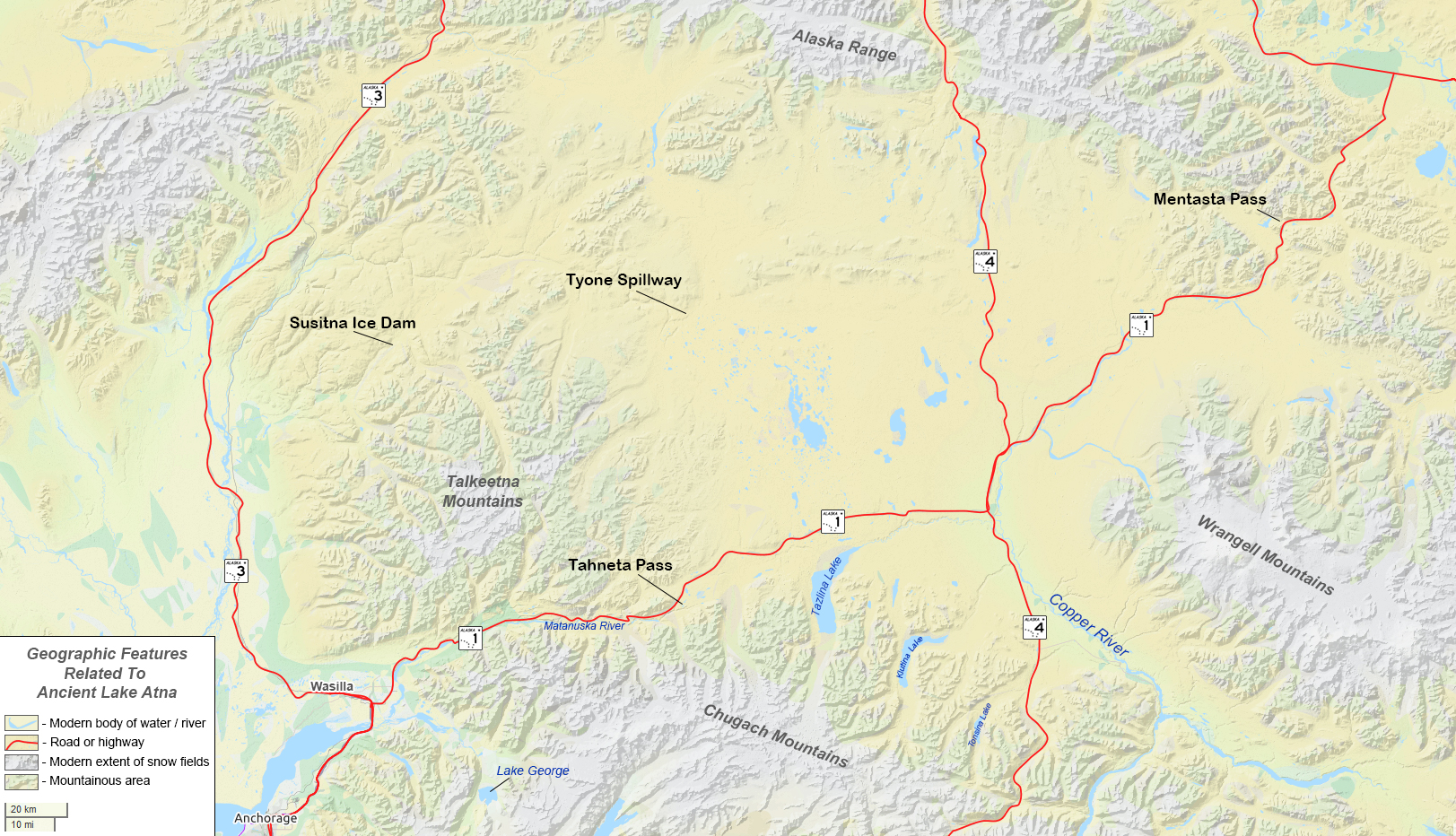
Map showing geographic features related to Lake Atna

In 2005, Michael Wiedmer, then a biologist at the Alaska Department of Fish and Game, was shown the carcass of a pygmy whitefish which had been collected from Lake George. This lake sits near the face of Knik Glacier, some distance from the Copper River Basin area. Pygmy whitefish are known to exist in remnant lakes of Lake Atna. This offered a clue as to a water connection that may have existed at some time in the past between Lake Atna and Lake George. Wiedmer also observed the presence of large, symmetrical hills in the Matanuska Valley, possibly of fluvial origin. This led Wiedmer to investigate the possibility of a megaflood down the valley from ancient Lake Atna.

Wiedmer's resulting research was published in a 2010 paper titled "Late Quaternary megafloods from Glacial Lake Atna, Southcentral Alaska, U.S.A.", with co-authors from the Quaternary Research Center at the University of Washington. Wiedmer's research suggested the possibility of Lake Atna being a serial generator of megafloods from glacial dam failures. One such possible flood originated from a catastrophic failure of a glacial dam 61 m (200 ft) in height at Tahneta Pass, located at the eastern end of Matanuska Valley. Wiedmer's maximum estimates of this flood place its size at a discharge rate of 2.0–3.3 million cubic meters per second. The velocity estimates of this flood range from a minimum of 13 m/s (29 mph) to 57 m/s (130 mph). The flood released a maximum of 1,400 km^{3} (340 cu mi) of water into the Wasilla region over the span of a week. The intensity of the release was such that it created dunes 34 m (112 ft) in height, with crests of the dunes 0.8 km (0.50 mi) and more apart. The dunes still exist today.

Other glacial dam outbursts may have occurred down the Susitna River, through Mentasta Pass into the Tok River, and down the Copper River itself. The Susitna River outburst may have been responsible for a flood three to four times more intense than the Tahneta Pass outburst, at a 7.0–11.3 × 10^{6}m^{3}s^{−1} discharge rate. This flood may have discharged nearly twice as much water as the Tahneta Pass outburst. The postulated glacial dam height for this flood was 346 m (1,135 ft).

== Remnants and effects ==
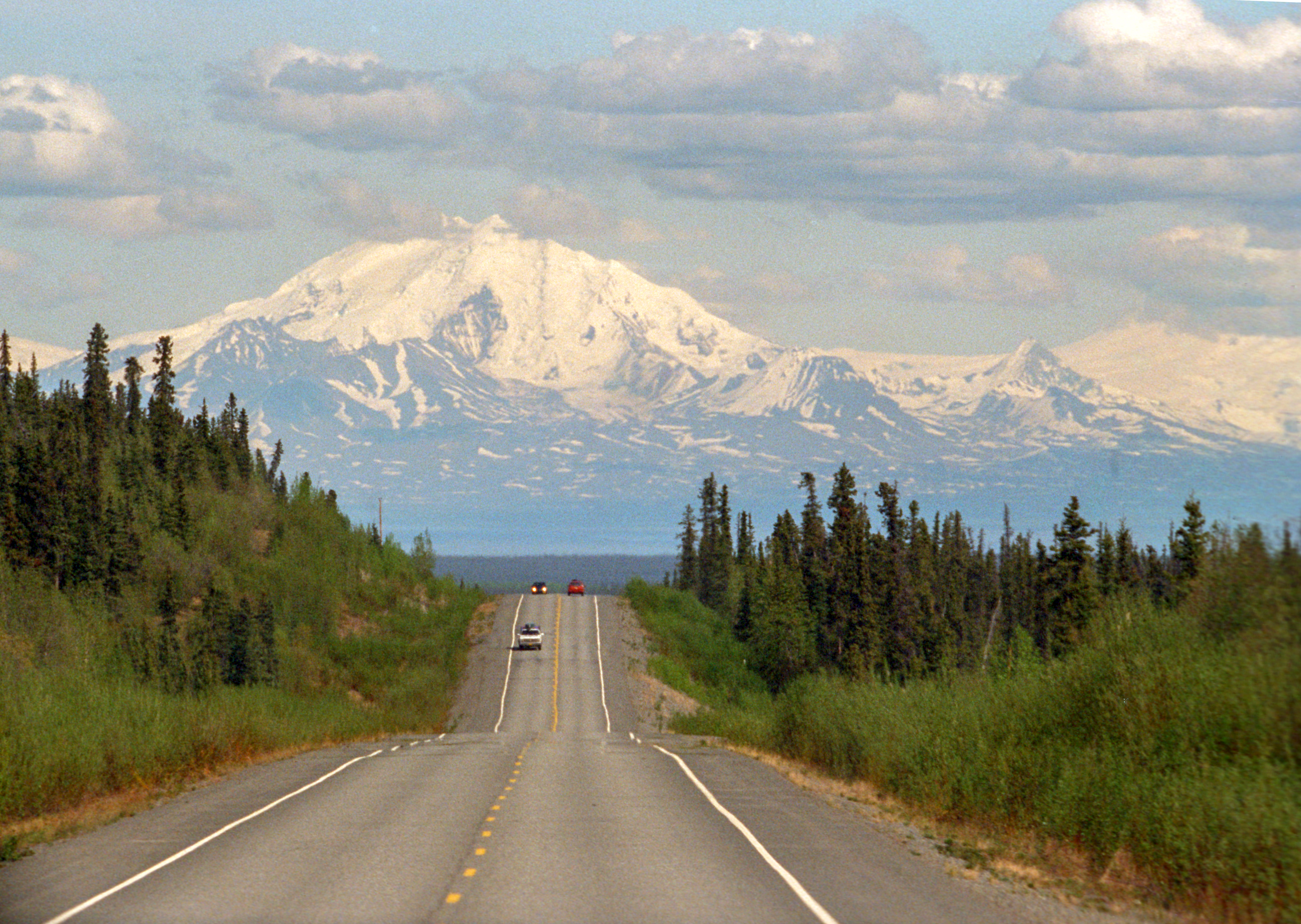
The Copper River Basin as it is now, looking east from Glenn Highway towards Mt. Drum. Lake Atna covered this basin.

Diamicton, glacial, glaciolacustrine, and lacustrine origin deposits exist in many areas of the Copper River Basin. All major rivers present today occupy narrow valleys that have cut up to 137 m (449 ft) into the bottom of the basin. Lacustrine sediments of the lake are visible in many river bluffs throughout the basin. Several extant lakes in the basin are remnants of the lake, including Tazlina Lake, Klutina Lake, and Tonsina Lake. Much of the unconsolidated fill of the basin is in permafrost, down to a maximum depth of 75 m (246 ft) in the central basin area. The postulated Matanuska Valley flood produced by Lake Atna 17,000 years ago may have been responsible for the deposition of a thin stratum of clay and silt grains in the Anchorage area. The collapse of this stratum caused catastrophic landslides in the Anchorage area during the 1964 Alaska earthquake contributing to the collapse of structures built above it.

== See also ==
- List of prehistoric lakes

== Sources ==
- Wiedmer, Michael; Montgomery, David R.; Gillespie, Alan R.; Greenberg, Harvey (2010), "Late Quaternary megafloods from Glacial Lake Atna, Southcentral Alaska, U.S.A." (PDF), Quaternary Research, 73 (3), Elsevier Inc.: 413–424, Bibcode:2010QuRes..73..413W, doi:10.1016/j.yqres.2010.02.005, S2CID 129855432, archived (PDF) from the original on 15 December 2017
- Ferrians, Oscar J. Jr. (1989), "Glacial Lake Atna, Copper River Basin, Alaskan" (PDF), U.S. Geological Survey Circular, 1026, U.S. Geological Survey: 85–88, archived (PDF) from the original on 31 January 2017
- Bennett, Matthew R. (2002), "Facies architecture within a regional glaciolacustrine basin: Copper River, Alaska" (PDF), Quaternary Science Reviews, 21 (20–22), Elsevier Inc.: 2237–2279, Bibcode:2002QSRv...21.2237B, doi:10.1016/S0277-3791(02)00027-6
- Winkler, Gary R. (2000), A Geologic Guide to Wrangell–Saint EliasNational Park and Preserve, Alaska (PDF), U.S. Department of the Interior, U.S. Geological Survey, archived from the original (PDF) on 20 February 2017
- Smith, Gerad M. (2019), Geoarchaeology of Glacial Lakes Susitna and Atna (PDF), Alaska Journal of Anthropology, archived from the original on 1 July 2021
