= Snyder Creek (Iowa River tributary) =

Stream in Iowa, U.S.

Coordinates: 41°34′47″N 91°31′38″W

Snyder Creek is a stream in the U.S. state of Iowa. It is a tributary to the Iowa River.

Snyder Creek was named after W. B. Snyder, a pioneer settler.
