= Plymouth, New York =

- Town

- Location within the state of New York
- Coordinates: 42°36′12″N 75°36′26″W
- Country: United States
- State: New York
- County: Chenango

Government
  - Type: Town Council
  - Town Supervisor: Grace Nucero-Alger (D)
  - Town Council: Members' List: • Lewis W. Somers (R); • Robert I. Brown (D); • Gary B. Simpson (R); • Drew F. Piaschyk (D)

Area
  - Total: 42.35 sq mi (109.68 km^{2})
  - Land: 42.18 sq mi (109.24 km^{2})
  - Water: 0.17 sq mi (0.44 km^{2})
- Elevation: 1,260 ft (384 m)

Population (2010)
  - Total: 1,804
  - Estimate (2016): 1,753
  - Density: 41.6/sq mi (16.05/km^{2})
- Time zone: UTC-5 (Eastern (EST))
  - Summer (DST): UTC-4 (EDT)
- ZIP Codes: 13832 (Plymouth); 13844 (South Plymouth); 13815 (Norwich); 13464 (Smyrna)
- Area code: 607
- FIPS code: 36-017-58772
- GNIS feature ID: 0979379
- Website: www.townofplymouthny.gov

Plymouth is a town in Chenango County, New York, United States. The population was 1,804 at the 2010 census. It is an interior town in the northern part of the county. The town is northwest of the city of Norwich. Plymouth was also known as Plymouth Rock.

== History ==
Families began to settle Plymouth circa 1794. The town was formed from the town of Norwich on April 7, 1806. Plymouth was also referred to as Frenchtown, Frank Town, or Francistown in honor of its early French inhabitants. In 1799, South Plymouth was settled by Ebenezer and Patience Frink, giving it the name Frinkville. John Young, the father of Brigham Young, lived in a cabin in the area; an abandoned saw mill sits there now.

== Geography ==
According to the United States Census Bureau, Plymouth has a total area of 42.4 square miles (109.7 km^{2}), of which 42.2 square miles (109.2 km^{2}) is land and 0.15 square miles (0.4 km^{2}), or 0.40%, is water.

New York State Route 23 is an east–west highway through the town.

== Demographics ==
Historical population
Census	Pop.	Note	%±
1820	1,496		—
1830	1,591		6.4%
1840	1,625		2.1%
1850	1,551		−4.6%
1860	1,668		7.5%
1870	1,523		−8.7%
1880	1,302		−14.5%
1890	1,156		−11.2%
1900	1,026		−11.2%
1910	913		−11.0%
1920	885		−3.1%
1930	767		−13.3%
1940	792		3.3%
1950	658		−16.9%
1960	1,004		52.6%
1970	1,174		16.9%
1980	1,515		29.0%
1990	1,704		12.5%
2000	2,049		20.2%
2010	1,804		−12.0%
2016 (est.)	1,753		−2.8%
U.S. Decennial Census

As of the census of 2000, there were 2,149 people, 692 households, and 513 families residing in the town. The population density was 48.6 inhabitants per square mile (18.8/km^{2}). There were 873 housing units at an average density of 20.7 per square mile (8.0/km^{2}). The racial makeup of the town was 91.17% White, 6.88% African American, 0.34% Native American, 1.17% from other races, and 0.44% from two or more races. Hispanic or Latino of any race were 4.64% of the population.

There were 692 households, out of which 34.8% had children under the age of 18 living with them, 58.2% were married couples living together, 8.2% had a female householder with no husband present, and 26.2% were non-families. 19.2% of all households were made up of individuals, and 6.6% had someone living alone who was 65 years of age or older. The average household size was 2.64 and the average family size was 2.97.

In the town, the population was spread out, with 24.4% under the age of 18, 8.5% from 18 to 24, 33.0% from 25 to 44, 24.5% from 45 to 64, and 9.6% who were 65 years of age or older. The median age was 36 years. For every 100 females, there were 135.2 males. For every 100 females age 18 and over, there were 142.2 males.

The median income for a household in the town was $53,611, and the median income for a family was $35,602. Males had a median income of $19,921 versus $20,000 for females. The per capita income for the town was $18,100. About 29.4% of families and 14.3% of the population were below the poverty line, including 19.7% of those under age 18 and 10.7% of those age 65 or over.

== Communities and locations in Plymouth, New York ==
- Kirk – A hamlet, located on NY-23, west-southwest of Plymouth village and north of Plymouth Reservoir.
- Plymouth – The hamlet of Plymouth is at the junction of County Roads 16 and 21. The community was originally called "Frinkville".
- Plymouth Reservoir – A reservoir in the southwestern part of the town.
- Sherburne Four Corners – A hamlet located in the northeastern corner of Plymouth on County Road 20, partly in other towns of Chenango County.
- South Plymouth – A hamlet southeast of Plymouth village, located on NY-23.
- Stuart Corners – A location west of South Plymouth on NY-23.

== Plymouth Volunteer Fire Department ==
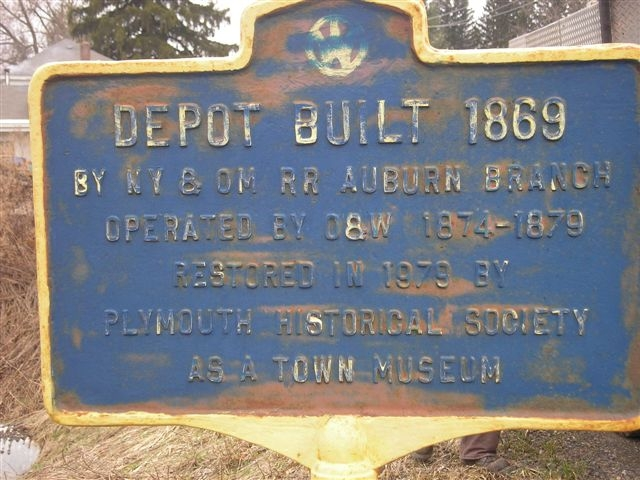
A historic marker for the NY & OM Railroad Auburn Branch depot, built in 1869 and operated by the O&W Railroad.

The Plymouth Volunteer Fire Department was formed in 1952. The department has remained an entirely volunteer service since its inception. The first fire apparatus were held in the barn of founding member Theodore Bates. In the 1960s the first fire station was built in the hamlet on County Road 16. To meet the needs of residents further away a second fire station was built on Plymouth Reservoir. In 1999 the Plymouth Volunteer Fire Department moved into their new centralized fire station located on State Highway 23 where it remains today.

== Notable person ==
- Marion Marsh Todd, attorney
