= Pilot Peak (Alaska) =

Remote summit in Alaska, USA

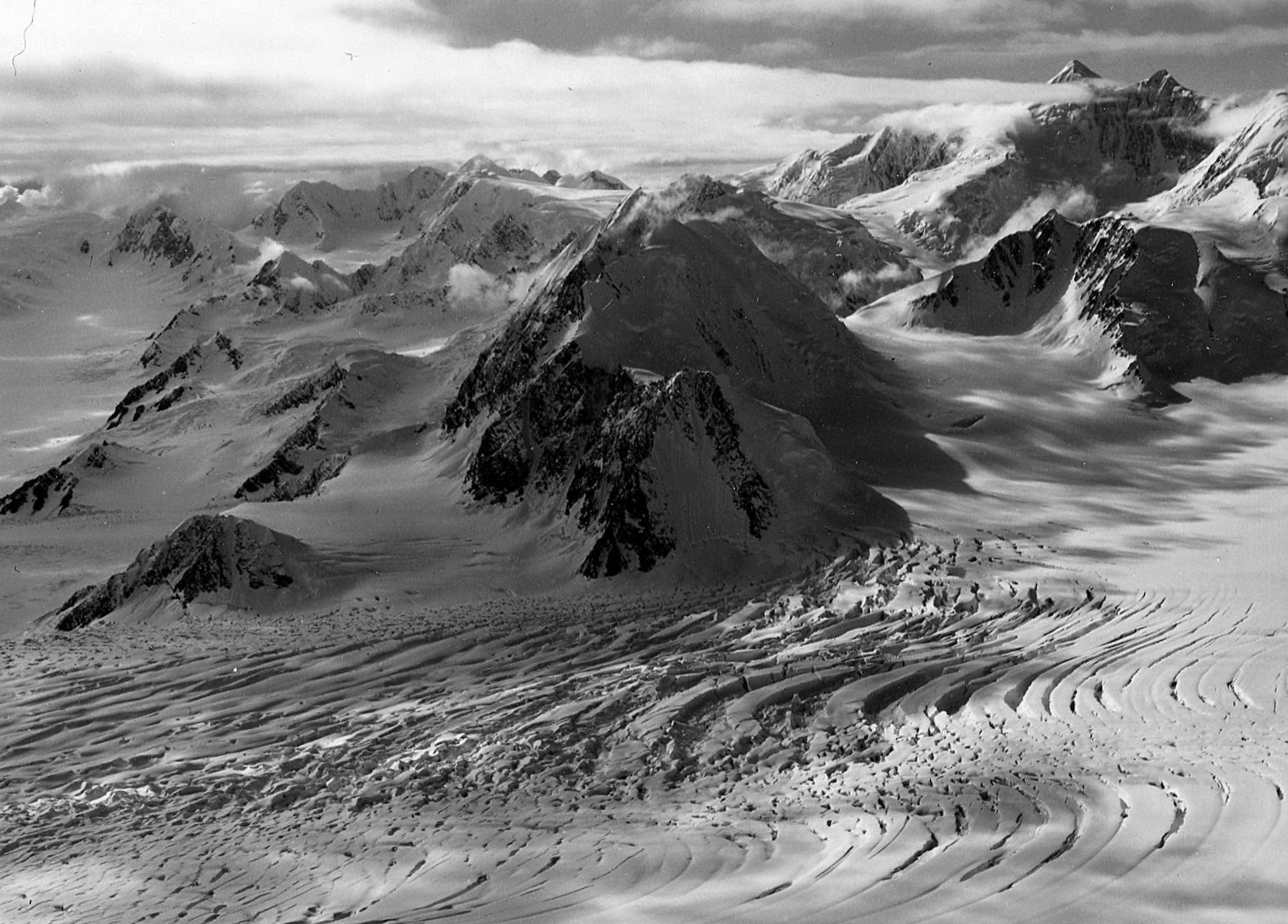
- Aerial view looking west Pilot centered, Einstein upper right

Highest point
- Elevation: 8,670 ft (2,640 m)
- Prominence: 1,720 ft (520 m)
- Parent peak: Sharkstooth Mountain (8,710 ft)
- Isolation: 3.14 mi (5.05 km)
- Coordinates: 61°20′50″N 146°54′07″W

Geography
- Location within Alaska
- Interactive map of Pilot Peak
- Location: Chugach National Forest; Copper River Census Area; Alaska, United States
- Parent range: Chugach Mountains
- Topo map: USGS Valdez B-8

Pilot Peak is an 8,670-foot (2,643 m) elevation glaciated summit located 27 mi (43 km) northwest of Valdez in the Chugach Mountains of the U.S. state of Alaska. Set on land managed by Chugach National Forest, this remote peak is situated 6.5 mi (10 km) east of Mount Einstein, and 5.7 mi (9 km) southwest of Tazlina Tower. The mountain was so named in 1955 by Lawrence E. Nielsen "because it is a very distinctive landmark that helped guide us back to camp in our explorations during 1955." Nielsen was leader of the Chugach Mountains Expedition which was sponsored by the Arctic Institute of North America. This name was officially adopted by the U.S. Board on Geographic Names in 1965.

== Climate ==
Based on the Köppen climate classification, Pilot Peak is located in a subarctic climate zone with long, cold, snowy winters, and cool summers. Weather systems coming off the Gulf of Alaska are forced upwards by the Chugach Mountains (orographic lift), causing heavy precipitation in the form of rainfall and snowfall. Winter temperatures can drop below −20 °C with wind chill factors below −30 °C. This climate supports the Columbia Glacier surrounding this mountain. The months May through June offer the most favorable weather for climbing.

== Gallery ==
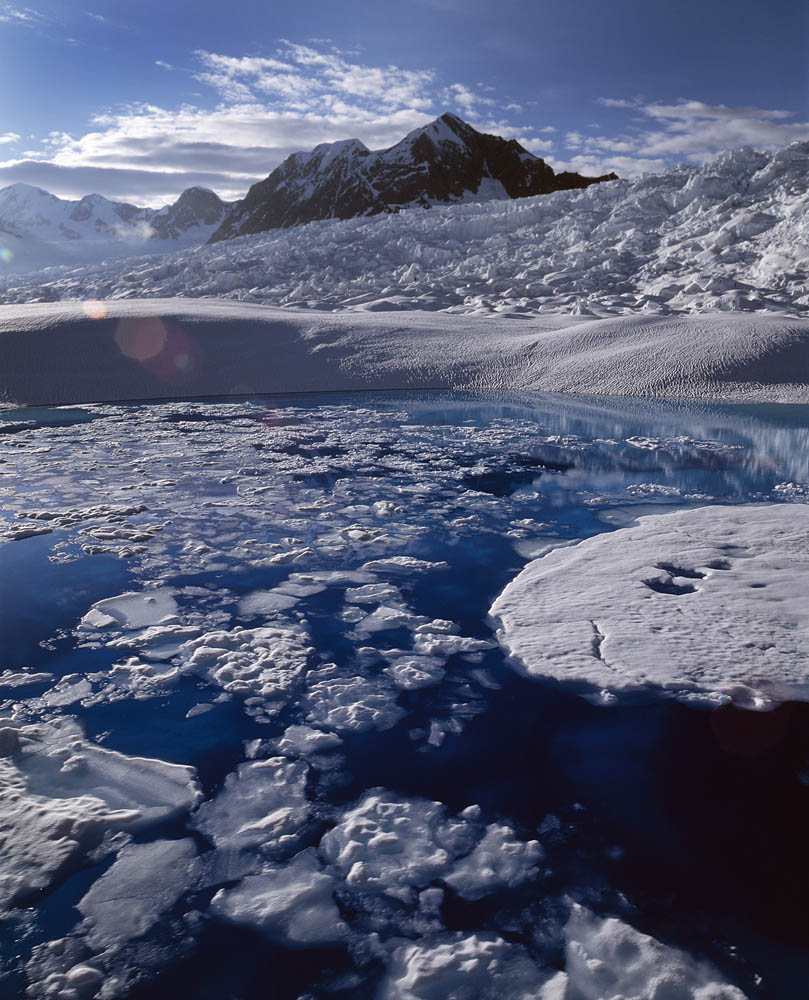
Pilot Peak from Columbia Glacier

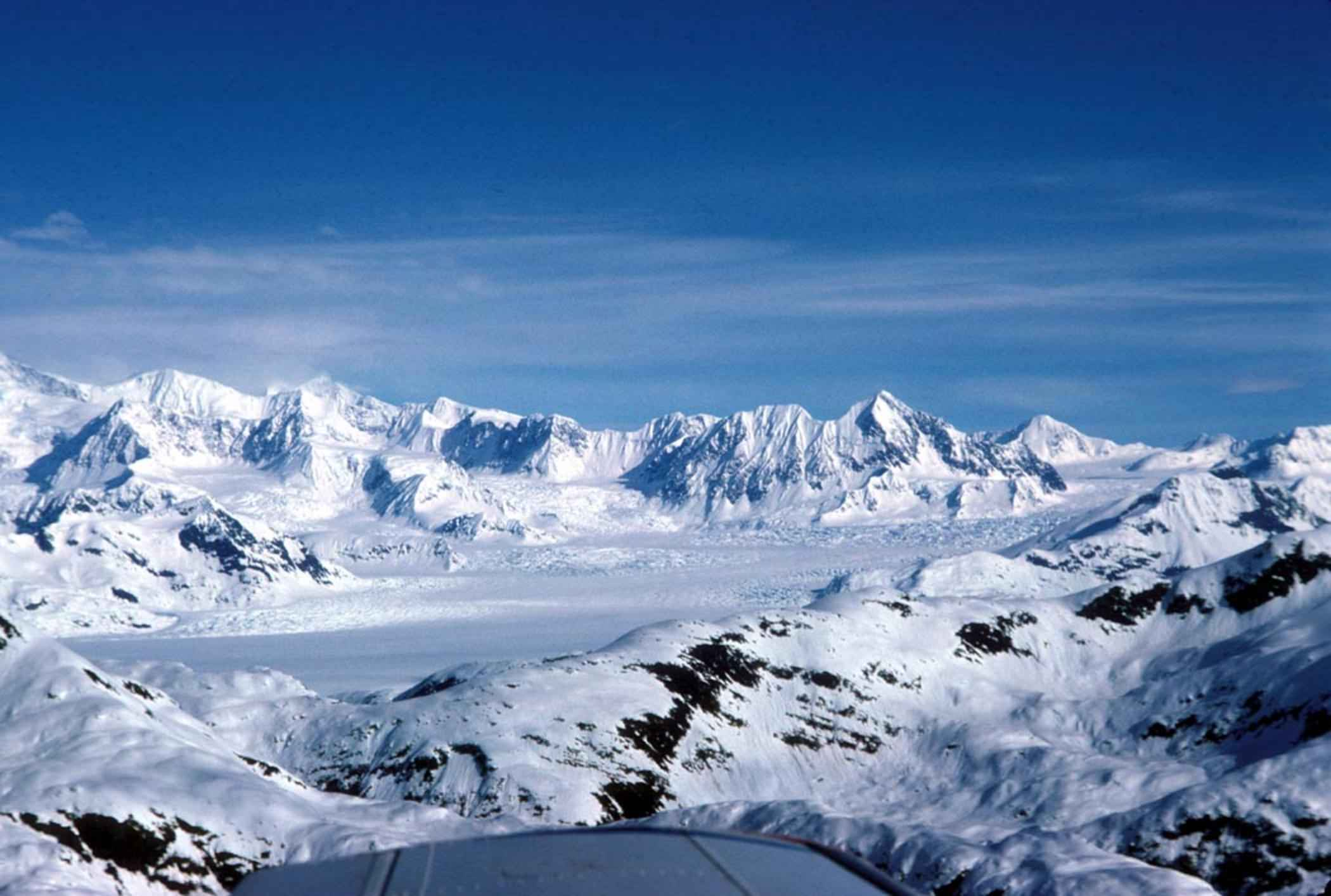
Pilot Peak right of center, south aspect

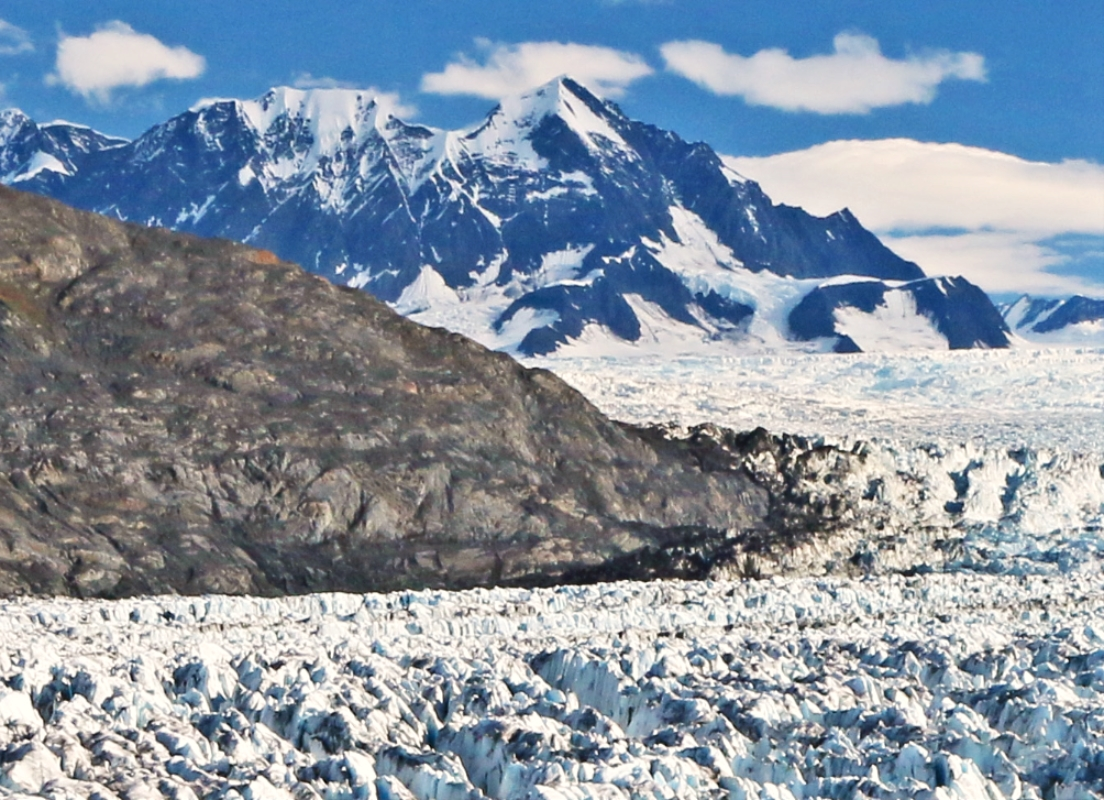

== See also ==
- List of mountain peaks of Alaska
- Geography of Alaska
