= Peters Corners, New York =

Hamlet in New York, United States

Coordinates: 42°56′29″N 78°30′45″W

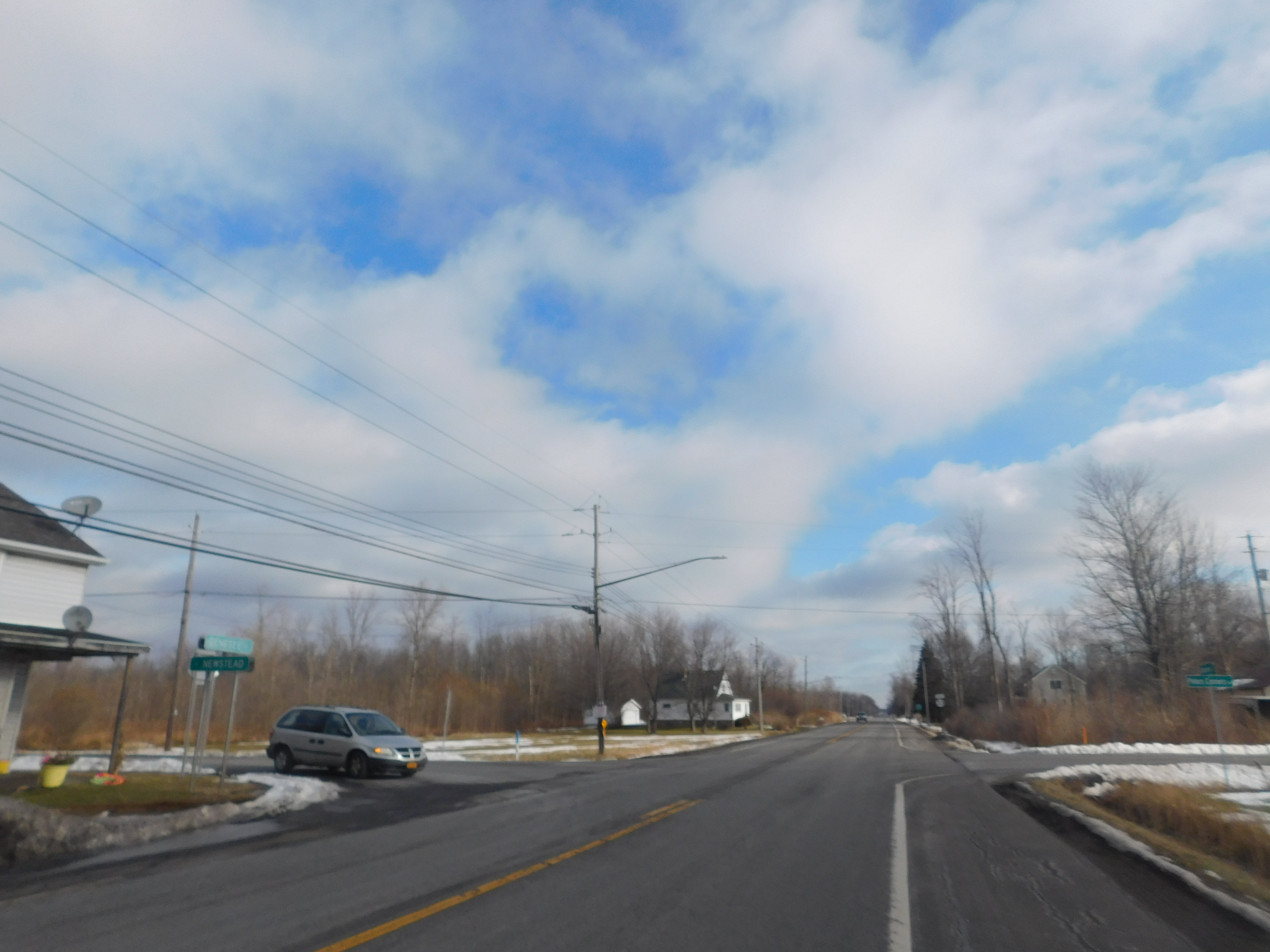
NY 33 eastbound in Peters Corners

Peters Corners is a hamlet in the town of Alden in Erie County, New York, United States.
