= Patchin, New York =

Hamlet in New York, United States

Coordinates: 42°39′28″N 78°44′51″W

Patchin is a hamlet in the town of Boston in Erie County, New York, United States.

Major landmarks include the Boston Town Hall and a New York State Police barracks (Troop A).
