= Petrolia, New York =

- Hamlet
- Location in the state of New York
- Coordinates: 42°05′22″N 78°01′06″W
- Country: United States
- State: New York
- County: Allegany
- Town: Scio

Petrolia (also Petrola, Petrolla) is a hamlet in the town of Scio in Allegany County, New York, United States.
