= Pilot Knob, New York =

- Hamlet
- Location within New York Location within the United States
- Coordinates: 43°30′57″N 73°37′45″W
- Country: United States
- State: New York
- County: Washington, Warren
- Elevation: 325 ft (99 m)

Population
  - Total: 199
- Time zone: UTC-5 (Eastern (EST))
  - Summer (DST): UTC-4 (EDT)
- ZIP code: 12844
- Area codes: 518 & 838
- GNIS feature ID: 960406

Pilot Knob is a hamlet in Washington and Warren counties, New York, United States. The community is located on the eastern shore of Lake George; while the Washington-Warren county line largely follows the shoreline, placing most of the community in Washington County, a small portion lies on the Warren County side.

The total City Population for Pilot Knob is about 199 with about 105 people per square mile.
