= Tazlina River =

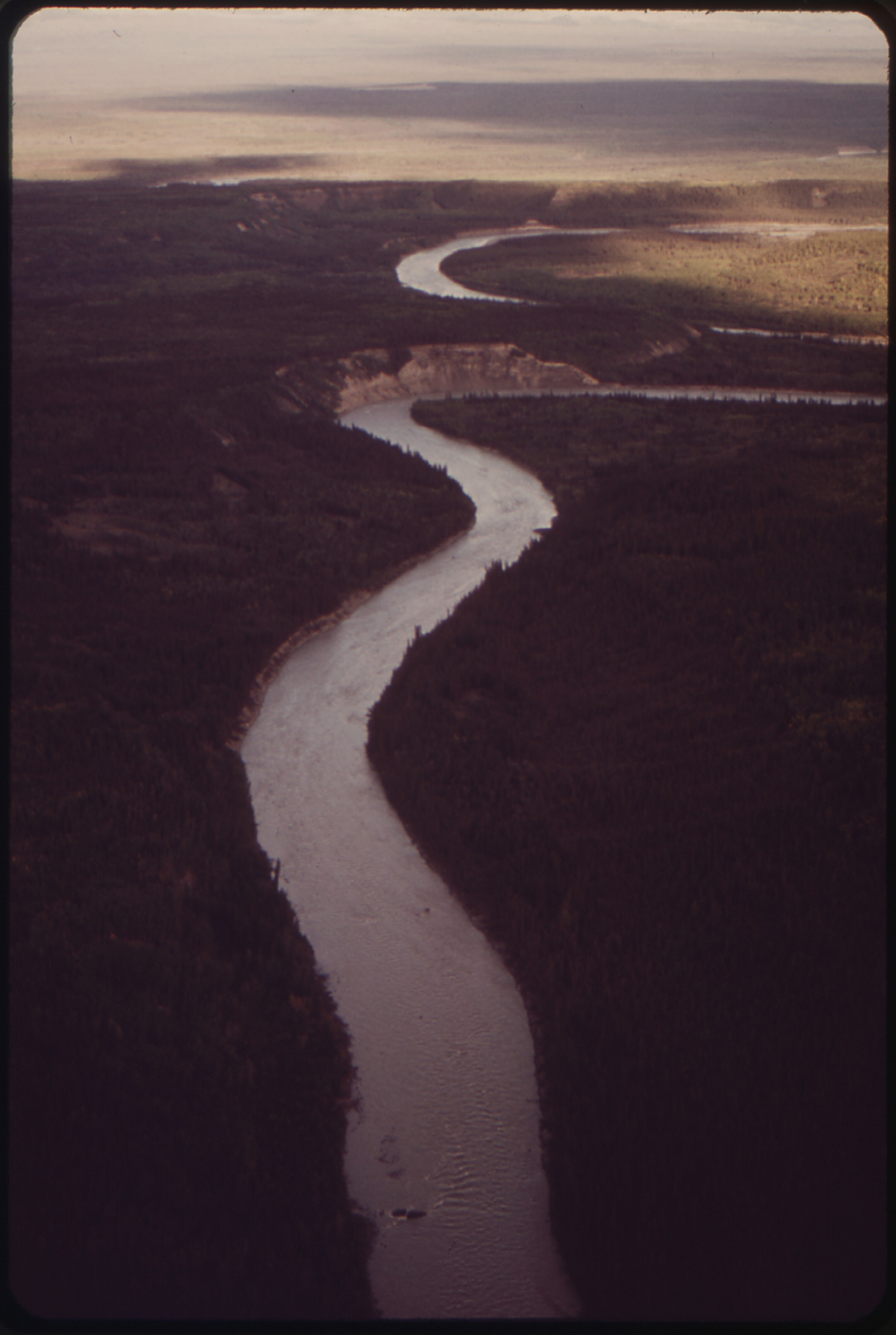
- Tazlina River (Dennis Cowals, 1973)

- Location of the mouth of the Tazlina River in Alaska

Location
- Country: United States
- State: Alaska
- Census Area: Copper River

Physical characteristics
- Source: Tazlina Lake
  - location: downstream of Tazlina Glacier, Chugach Mountains
  - coordinates: 62°00′38″N 146°14′11″W
  - elevation: 1,800 ft (550 m)
- Mouth: Copper River
  - location: 7 miles (11 km) southeast of Glenallen
  - coordinates: 62°02′19″N 145°23′14″W
  - elevation: 1,089 ft (332 m)
- Length: 30 mi (48 km)

The Tazlina River is a 30-mile (48 km) tributary of the Copper River in the U.S. state of Alaska. Draining Tazlina Lake, it flows generally east to meet the larger river 7 miles (11 km) southeast of Glennallen.

== Course ==
Tazlina Lake lies at the base of Tazlina Glacier in the Chugach Mountains north of Valdez. From the lake, the river meanders toward Glennallen, receiving Durham Creek and then Nickel Creek from the right and Moose Creek from the left. The east–west trending Glenn Highway runs to the left (north) of the river and approximately parallel to it for most of its course. Downstream of Glenallen, the Tazlina River passes under the Trans-Alaska Pipeline and the north–south trending Richardson Highway before entering the Copper River.

== Fishing ==
Accessible from the Richardson Highway, which intersects the lower main stem, the Tazlina River is generally too silt-laden for good sportfishing. Tazlina Lake is likewise silty. However, clear-running tributary streams and lakes, accessible from the Glenn Highway as well as by floatplane or boat, offer good fishing opportunities. The main species of game fish in the Tazlina River system are king salmon, red salmon, Dolly Varden, and Arctic grayling.

== Boating ==
Whitewater enthusiasts with sufficient skills can float the Tazlina River in a variety of watercraft. It is possible to take a floatplane to Tazlina Lake and start downstream from there. It is also possible to launch along a tributary, the Little Nelchina River, where it meets the Glenn Highway at Little Nelchina State Recreation Site. This route includes 4 miles (6 km) on the Little Nelchina, then 23 miles (37 km) on the Nelchina River, followed by 10 miles (16 km) of paddling down the lake from the mouth of the Nelchina to the start of the Tazlina.

The longer float includes rapids Class II (medium) to III (difficult) on the International Scale of River Difficulty. Hazards include logjams and the possibility of insufficient water on the Little Nelchina; strong winds on the lake; swift, cold, silty water on the Tazlina, and a difficult set of rapids called Oxbow Drop upstream of the take-out place at the Richardson Highway bridge.

== See also ==
- List of rivers of Alaska
