= Tazlina Glacier =

Glacier in Alaska, United States

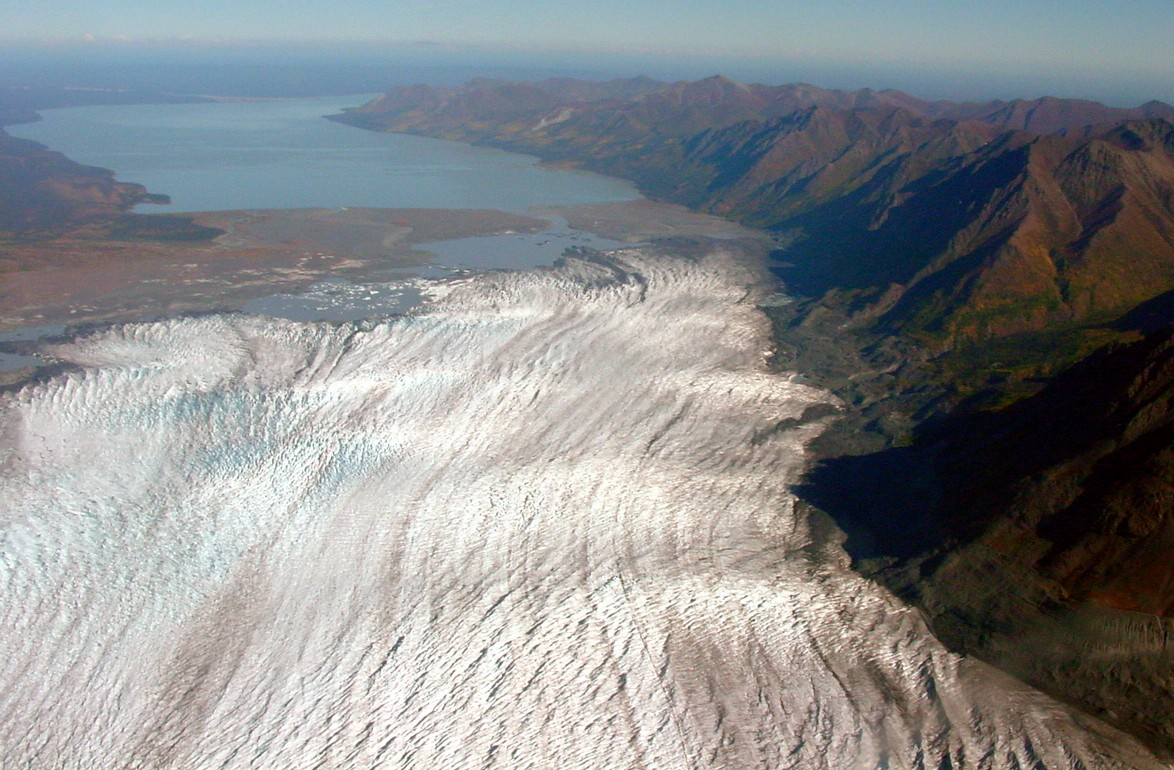

- Location within Alaska
- Interactive map of Tazlina Glacier
- Type: Valley glacier
- Location: Copper River Census Area, Alaska, U.S.
- Coordinates: 61°28′51″N 146°35′41″W
- Length: 25 mi (40 km)
- Terminus: outwash plains
- Status: Retreating

Tazlina Glacier is a 25 mi (40 km) long glacier in the U.S. state of Alaska. It begins 1.5 miles (2.4 km) north of Mount Cashman and Mount Shouplina then flows north to its terminus one mile (1.6 km) south of Tazlina Lake and 43 miles (69 km) north of Valdez. Tazlina Glacier is the largest northward flowing glacier in the Chugach Mountains. The terminus of the glacier is retreating and thinning. The glacier is around the Valdez area and is also a popular attraction for tourists. At the foot of the glacier lies the Tazlina Lake and the Tazlina River.

== See also ==
- List of glaciers in the United States
- Tazlina Tower
