= Tazlina Lake =

Lake in the state of Alaska, United States

- Location within Alaska Location within North America
- Location: Valdez-Cordova (CA), Alaska, United States
- Coordinates: 61°53′7″N 146°29′4″W
- Primary outflows: Tazlina River
- Basin countries: United States
- Max. length: 21 mi (34 km)
- Surface elevation: 1,785 feet (544 m)

Tazlina Lake is a body of water, 21 miles (34 km) long, in the U.S. state of Alaska. It is at the head of the Tazlina River, 1 mile (1.6 km) north of the 1952 terminus of Tazlina Glacier and 62 miles (100 km) north of Valdez, in the Copper River basin. It is a remnant of ancient Lake Atna.

== History ==
The Russian Shturman Serebrenikov appears to have been the first "white man" to reach this lake; according to his notes he was here on May 30, 1848. He recorded the name as "Plavezhnoye Ozero," or "Plavezhni Lake." He reported two Indian families living on the lake (Allen, 1887, p. 21.).

=== Etymology ===
Local name taken from the stream that drains the lake, reported in 1898 by F. C. Schrader, USGS.

== See also ==
- List of lakes of Alaska
