= National Register of Historic Places listings in Chenango County, New York =

Location of Chenango County in New York

List of the National Register of Historic Places listings in Chenango County, New York

This is intended to be a complete list of properties and districts listed on the National Register of Historic Places in Chenango County, New York. The locations of National Register properties and districts for which the latitude and longitude coordinates are included below, may be seen in a map.

This National Park Service list is complete through NPS recent listings posted July 10, 2026.

Contents: Counties in New York
Albany (Albany) – Allegany – Bronx – Broome – Cattaraugus – Cayuga – Chautauqua – Chemung – Chenango – Clinton – Columbia – Cortland – Delaware – Dutchess (Poughkeepsie, Rhinebeck) – Erie (Buffalo) – Essex – Franklin – Fulton – Genesee – Greene – Hamilton – Herkimer – Jefferson – Kings – Lewis – Livingston – Madison – Monroe (Rochester) – Montgomery – Nassau – New York (Below 14th Street, 14th to 59th Streets, 59th to 110th Streets, Above 110th Street, Islands) – Niagara (Niagara Falls) – Oneida – Onondaga (Syracuse) – Ontario – Orange – Orleans – Oswego – Otsego – Putnam – Queens – Rensselaer – Richmond – Rockland – St. Lawrence – Saratoga – Schenectady – Schoharie – Schuyler – Seneca – Steuben – Suffolk – Sullivan – Tioga – Tompkins – Ulster – Warren – Washington – Wayne – Westchester (Northern, Southern, New Rochelle, Peekskill, Yonkers) – Wyoming – Yates

== Current listings ==
	Name on the Register	Image	Date listed	Location	City or town	Description
1	Bainbridge Historic District	Bainbridge Historic District	November 9, 1982 (#82001095)	E. Main, Juliand, N. Main, Pearl, S. Main, and W. Main Sts., Park Pl. and Railroad Ave. 42°17′41″N 75°28′46″W	Bainbridge	
2	Bates Round Barn	Bates Round Barn	September 29, 1984 (#84002071)	NY 12; 42°18′10″N 75°48′07″W	Greene	
3	Theodore Burr House	Theodore Burr House	September 11, 1981 (#81000402)	Fort Hill Sq. 42°26′27″N 75°35′48″W	Oxford	
4	Calvary Episcopal Church	Calvary Episcopal Church	February 20, 1998 (#98000130)	North St., W of Moon Hill Rd. 42°29′58″N 75°46′05″W	McDonough	
5	Chenango Canal Prism, Towpath and Lock 106		December 21, 2020 (#100005922)	Cty. Rd. 79 and Cty. Rd. 32 (Stillwater Road); 42°14′53″N 75°48′59″W	Chenango Forks	
6	Chenango County Courthouse District	Chenango County Courthouse District	June 10, 1975 (#75001178)	Irregular pattern between Hayes and Mechanic Sts. and Maple Ave. and City Hall; 42°31′53″N 75°31′27″W	Norwich	
7	Clinton-Rosekrans Law Building	Clinton-Rosekrans Law Building	July 27, 1979 (#79001569)	62 Genesee St; 42°19′47″N 75°46′15″W	Greene	
8	Columbus Community Church	Columbus Community Church	March 20, 1986 (#86000487)	NY 80; 42°41′01″N 75°22′24″W	Columbus	
9	District School 2		February 25, 2004 (#04000096)	Cty Rte 27; 42°18′53″N 75°35′54″W	Coventryville	
10	District School 4		April 21, 2004 (#04000353)	NY 235; 42°18′53″N 75°38′22″W	Coventry	
11	Earlville Historic District	Earlville Historic District	October 29, 1982 (#82001096)	Fayette and N., S., E., and W. Main Sts. 42°44′25″N 75°32′42″W	Earlville	
12	Eaton Family Residence-Jewish Center of Norwich	Eaton Family Residence-Jewish Center of Norwich	June 4, 2009 (#09000375)	72 S. Broad St. 42°31′38″N 75°31′25″W	Norwich	
13	Earlville Opera House	Earlville Opera House	January 22, 1973 (#73001169)	12-20 E. Main St. 42°44′22″N 75°32′41″W	Earlville	
14	Emmanuel Episcopal Church Complex	Emmanuel Episcopal Church Complex	August 26, 2009 (#09000654)	37 W. Main St. 42°31′50″N 75°31′38″W	Norwich	1874 Gothic Revival church by Isaac G. Perry, with 1915 parish house
15	Greene Historic District	Greene Historic District	September 9, 1982 (#82003350)	Chenango, Genesee, and Jackson Sts. 42°19′44″N 75°46′18″W	Greene	
16	Guilford Center Presbyterian Church	Guilford Center Presbyterian Church	September 24, 2004 (#04001059)	Cty Rd. 36; 42°24′23″N 75°27′53″W	Guilford Center	1817 church now home to local historic society
17	Guilford Center Cemetery	Guilford Center Cemetery	October 5, 2005 (#05001129)	Cty Rte. 36; 42°24′29″N 75°27′57″W	Guilford Center	Deceased buried here include many of Guilford's early settlers, including some Revolutionary War veterans, going back to 1809.
18	Charles C. Hovey House and Strong Leather Company Mill	Charles C. Hovey House and Strong Leather Company Mill	December 6, 1996 (#96001426)	53 W. Main St. and 10 Bixby St. 42°17′45″N 75°29′00″W	Bainbridge	
19	Jewell Family Homestead	Jewell Family Homestead	January 31, 2017 (#100000611)	120 Furnace Hill Rd. 42°24′29″N 75°29′34″W	Guilford	1824 house built by New Hampshire family is well-preserved example of New England-style center-hall plan structure from that era.
20	Loomis Family Farm	Loomis Family Farm	June 13, 2014 (#14000329)	414 S. Tyner Rd. 42°25′27″N 75°39′58″W	Oxford	
21	Main Street Historic District	Main Street Historic District	June 30, 1983 (#83001662)	169-191 and 158-180 Main St. 42°13′41″N 75°31′36″W	Afton	
22	Holden B. Mathewson House	Holden B. Mathewson House	October 23, 2009 (#09000860)	1567 NY 26; 42°13′41″N 75°31′36″W	South Otselic	
23	Methodist-Episcopal Church of Norwich	Methodist-Episcopal Church of Norwich	August 28, 2003 (#03000846)	74 N. Broad St. 42°32′01″N 75°31′26″W	Norwich	
24	Horace O. Moss House	Horace O. Moss House	May 17, 1974 (#74001224)	45 S. Main St. 42°37′16″N 75°19′55″W	New Berlin	
25	New Berlin Historic District	New Berlin Historic District	August 12, 1982 (#82005025)	Roughly along Main, West and Genesee Sts. 42°37′21″N 75°19′56″W	New Berlin	
26	Newton Homestead	Newton Homestead	June 3, 1982 (#82003351)	Ridge Rd. 42°39′04″N 75°47′08″W	South Otselic	Octagon house built in 1860
27	North Broad Street Historic District	North Broad Street Historic District	November 21, 1978 (#78001845)	Broad St. 42°32′14″N 75°31′30″W	Norwich	Three-block area of late 19th- and early 20th-century homes built by city's elite
28	North Guilford Cemetery	North Guilford Cemetery	January 24, 2020 (#100004911)	158 Whites Hill Rd. 42°27′10″N 75°28′34″W	North Guilford	
29	Norwich Pharmacal Company Warehouse	Norwich Pharmacal Company Warehouse	November 16, 2018 (#100003111)	20 American Ave. 42°31′50″N 75°31′18″W	Norwich	1916 warehouse known locally as the Unguentine Building, for the ghost sign promoting the surgical antiseptic what is now Norwich Pharma Services introduced in 1893
30	Oxford Village Historic District	Oxford Village Historic District	September 17, 1985 (#85002481)	Roughly Washington Ave., State St., Chenango River, Merchant & Green Sts., Washington Park, Albany & Pleasant Sts. 42°26′27″N 75°35′40″W	Oxford	
31	Phillips–Manning House		March 13, 2017 (#100000754)	154 Nursery St. 42°19′03″N 75°38′17″W	Coventry	1840s Greek Revival house of two prominent families in town
32	Rockdale Community Church	Rockdale Community Church	October 5, 2005 (#05001128)	NY 8; 42°22′39″N 75°24′30″W	Rockdale	
33	Rockwells Mills Historic District	Rockwells Mills Historic District	August 30, 2010 (#10000610)	NY 8 and Crandall Road; 42°26′56″N 75°23′24″W	Guilford	
34	Sannick Family Farm		April 18, 2007 (#07000335)	129 Jordan Ln. 42°23′27″N 75°36′59″W	South Oxford	
35	Sherburne High School	Sherburne High School	November 3, 1988 (#88002185)	16 Chapel St. 42°40′33″N 75°29′39″W	Sherburne	
36	Sherburne Historic District	Sherburne Historic District	October 29, 1982 (#82001097)	N. and S. Main, E. and W. State, Classic, Summit and Church Sts. and Park Ave. 42°40′37″N 75°29′38″W	Sherburne	
37	Smithville Valley Grange No. 1397	Smithville Valley Grange No. 1397	August 6, 1998 (#98001009)	NY 41; 42°23′57″N 75°48′33″W	Smithville Flats	
38	Smyrna Elementary School	Smyrna Elementary School	December 16, 1996 (#96001428)	School St., SE of NY 80; 42°41′10″N 75°34′12″W	Smyrna	
39	Smyrna Town Hall-Opera House	Smyrna Town Hall-Opera House	July 25, 2008 (#08000699)	Academy Street; 42°41′14″N 75°34′14″W	Smyrna	
40	South Otselic Historic District	South Otselic Historic District	September 8, 1983 (#83001663)	Gladding, N. and S. Main Sts., Clarence Church and Plank Rds., and Potter Ave. 42°38′48″N 75°46′52″W	South Otselic	
41	Upperville Meeting House	Upperville Meeting House	April 1, 2002 (#02000307)	NY 80; 42°42′00″N 75°36′58″W	Upperville	
42	US Post Office-Norwich	US Post Office-Norwich	May 11, 1989 (#88002380)	20-22 E. Main St. 42°31′51″N 75°31′20″W	Norwich	1932 building with elaborate classically-detailed stonework
43	US Post Office-Oxford	US Post Office-Oxford	May 11, 1989 (#88002392)	2 S. Washington Ave. 42°26′32″N 75°35′56″W	Oxford	
44	West Hill Cemetery	West Hill Cemetery	January 18, 2006 (#05001534)	NY 80; 42°41′39″N 75°31′56″W	Sherburne	
45	White Store Church and Evergreen Cemetery	White Store Church and Evergreen Cemetery	February 10, 1995 (#95000047)	Jct. of NY 8 and White Store Rd., 4 mi. S of South New Berlin; 42°29′01″N 75°24′23″W	Norwich	
46	Hazard Willcox Jr. Farm		April 12, 2019 (#100003626)	549 Co. Rd. 14; 42°43′26″N 75°33′19″W	Earlville	
47	Young Round Barn	Young Round Barn	September 29, 1984 (#84002072)	NY 12; 42°17′39″N 75°48′28″W	Greene	

== See also ==
- National Register of Historic Places listings in New York
