= Willard W. Isham =

American politician

Willard William Isham (March 24, 1820 – November 26, 1876) was an American carriage maker, businessman, and politician.

Born in Smyrna, Chenango County, New York, Isham learned the carriage maker's trade. In 1843, he open a carriage shop in Earlville, New York. In 1845, Isham moved to Delavan, Walworth County, Wisconsin Territory and open a carriage shop. He also owned a blacksmith shop. He was also in the grocery and hardware business. Isham served as mayor and treasurer of Delavan, Wisconsin. He also served on the Walworth County Board of Supervisors and was chairman of the county board. Isham served on the school board and was the clerk of the school board. In 1855, Isham served in the Wisconsin State Assembly and was a Republican. Isham served as trustee of the Wisconsin Deaf and Dumb Asylum and died while still in office.
