= Greenwood Museum =

1980s museum in New York, US

Coordinates: 42.700086°N 75.616084°W

The Green-wood Museum at the 19th-century Upperville Meeting House, in Upperville, New York, was a museum created by artist Terrance Lindall in the 1980s.

The Quaker meeting house is flanked by a park, a rectory and overlooks a waterfall on Pleasant Brook alongside Quaker Hill Road.

Lindall gave the meeting house back to the Quakers of Hamilton, New York, to devote his energies to helping build the Williamsburg Art & Historical Center in New York City.

Interior

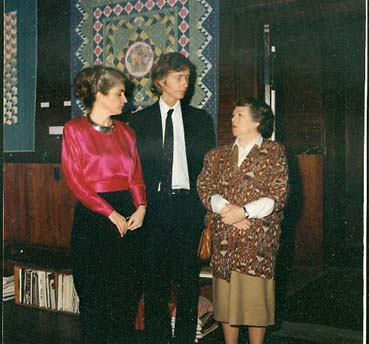
Margit Echols (Quiltmaker), Terrance Lindall (Director), Verdalee Tombelaine (Volunteer Coordinator of the Metropolitan Museum of Art)
