= Adelaide Daughaday =

American missionary

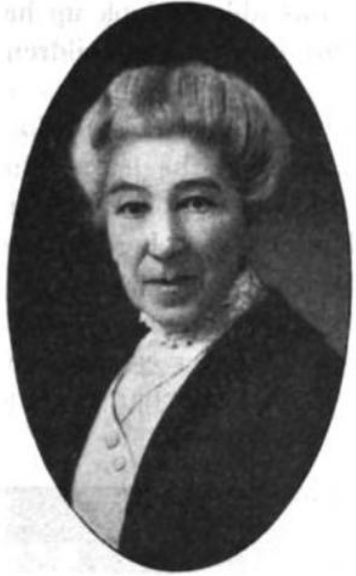
- Adelaide Daughaday, from a 1919 publication.
- Born: March 2, 1845; Guilford, New York
- Died: July 1, 1919 (aged 74); Sapporo
- Occupation: Christian missionary

Adelaide Daughaday (March 2, 1845 – July 1, 1919) was an American Christian missionary in Japan.

== Early life ==
Mary Adelaide Daughaday was born in Guilford, New York, the daughter of William Hamilton Daughaday and Hannah Elizabeth Bell Daughaday.

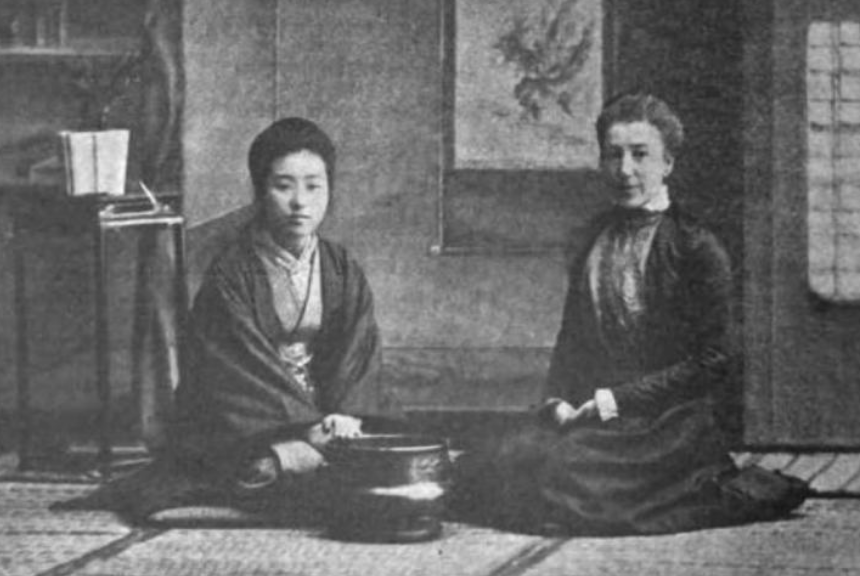
Daughaday (right), with an unnamed Japanese assistant.

== Career ==
Daughaday arrived in Japan as a missionary in 1883. She taught at Baikwa Girls' School in Osaka, in Tottori, and for her last twenty years in Sapporo. She made a particular effort for temperance in Japan. She spent time lecturing in the United States on furloughs in 1895 to 1897, and 1907 to 1908.

Daughaday wrote about Japan for American church and secular publications. In 1916, she described events surrounded the coronation of Emperor Taishō, which worried her because it included bottles of sake as imperial gifts. One of her last reports from Sapporo mentioned the end of World War I and the 1918 flu pandemic: "Like the rest of the world, Japan has suffered from influenza. Schools have been closed, and the ordinary routine of life confused."

== Death ==
Daughaday died in Sapporo, Japan in 1919, aged 74 years.
