= Smyrna (village), New York =

Smyrna, New York
- Village
- Location within the state of New York
- Coordinates: 42°41′11″N 75°34′17″W
- Country: United States
- State: New York
- County: Chenango
- Town: Smyrna

Area
  - Total: 0.24 sq mi (0.63 km^{2})
  - Land: 0.24 sq mi (0.63 km^{2})
  - Water: 0 sq mi (0.00 km^{2})
- Elevation: 1,204 ft (367 m)

Population (2020)
  - Total: 197
  - Density: 806.9/sq mi (311.53/km^{2})
- Time zone: UTC-5 (Eastern (EST))
  - Summer (DST): UTC-4 (EDT)
- ZIP code: 13464
- Area code: 607
- FIPS code: 36-68099
- GNIS feature ID: 0965545
- Website: https://www.townofsmyrnany.gov/village-contact-list.php

Smyrna is a village in Chenango County, New York, United States. The population was 197 at the 2020 census. The village is located in the town of Smyrna and is near the northern border of Chenango County.

== History ==
The village of Smyrna was incorporated in 1829.

== Geography ==
Smyrna village is located in the eastern part of the town of Smyrna at 42°41′10″N 75°34′16″W (42.686328, -75.571284). It is located on New York State Route 80 at the junction of County Road 20. The village of Sherburne is 4 miles (6 km) to the east, and the hamlet of Otselic is 8 miles (13 km) to the west on NY-80.

According to the United States Census Bureau, the village of Smyrna has a total area of 0.23 square miles (0.6 km^{2}), all land. Pleasant Brook, an eastward-flowing tributary of the Chenango River, forms the southern boundary of the village.

== Demographics ==
Historical population
Census	Pop.	Note	%±
1880	308		—
1900	300		—
1910	257		−14.3%
1920	261		1.6%
1930	226		−13.4%
1940	256		13.3%
1950	269		5.1%
1960	286		6.3%
1970	247		−13.6%
1980	225		−8.9%
1990	211		−6.2%
2000	241		14.2%
2010	213		−11.6%
2020	197		−7.5%
U.S. Decennial Census

As of the census of 2000, there were 241 people, 79 households, and 57 families residing in the village. The population density was 981.7 inhabitants per square mile (379.0/km^{2}). There were 92 housing units at an average density of 374.7 per square mile (144.7/km^{2}). The racial makeup of the village was 98.76% White, 0.41% Native American, and 0.83% from two or more races.

There were 79 households, out of which 39.2% had children under the age of 18 living with them, 58.2% were married couples living together, 10.1% had a female householder with no husband present, and 27.8% were non-families. 20.3% of all households were made up of individuals, and 8.9% had someone living alone who was 65 years of age or older. The average household size was 3.05 and the average family size was 3.56.

In the village, the population was spread out, with 33.6% under the age of 18, 8.3% from 18 to 24, 26.6% from 25 to 44, 20.3% from 45 to 64, and 11.2% who were 65 years of age or older. The median age was 32 years. For every 100 females, there were 82.6 males. For every 100 females age 18 and over, there were 86.0 males.

The median income for a household in the village was $35,000, and the median income for a family was $33,125. Males had a median income of $25,625 versus $17,500 for females. The per capita income for the village was $12,310. About 15.8% of families and 12.0% of the population were below the poverty line, including 15.6% of those under the age of eighteen and none of those 65 or over.
