= Guilford (CDP), New York =

Guilford, New York
- Census-designated place
- Location within the state of New York
- Coordinates: 42°24′21″N 75°29′35″W
- Country: United States
- State: New York
- County: Chenango
- Town: Guilford

Area
  - Total: 1.46 sq mi (3.77 km^{2})
  - Land: 1.34 sq mi (3.46 km^{2})
  - Water: 0.12 sq mi (0.31 km^{2})
- Elevation: 1,513 ft (461 m)

Population (2020)
  - Total: 322
  - Density: 241.1/sq mi (93.07/km^{2})
- Time zone: UTC-5 (Eastern (EST))
  - Summer (DST): UTC-4 (EDT)
- ZIP code: 13780
- Area code: 607
- FIPS code: 36-31137
- GNIS feature ID: 0951905

Guilford is a census-designated place (CDP) in Chenango County, New York, United States. The population was 362 at the 2010 census. It is located in the town of Guilford.

== Geography ==
The Guilford CDP comprises the hamlets of Guilford and Guilford Center in the west-central part of the town of Guilford. It is located on County Road 35, which leads northwest 7 miles (11 km) to Oxford and southeast 10 miles (16 km) to Sidney.

According to the United States Census Bureau, the Guilford CDP has a total area of 1.5 square miles (3.8 km^{2}), of which 1.4 square miles (3.5 km^{2}) is land and 0.1 square miles (0.3 km^{2}), or 8.12%, is water. Guilford Lake occupies the northwestern end of the CDP and drains to the east via Guilford Creek, which passes through both Guilford and Guilford Center on its way southeast to the Unadilla River.

== Demographics ==
In the 2020 census, there were 322 people, 69 families, and 184 housing units. The racial demographics were 94.7% White, 1.2% Asian, 0.9% from some other race, and 3.0% were from two or more races. 1.8% of the population were Hispanic or Latino. The median age was 47.4 years old. 10.7% of the population were 65 years or older, 5.0% of the population was between 65 and 74 and 5.7% of the population was between 75 and 84 years old.

The median income was $75,139, and the median income was $71,250 for families. 0% of the population were in poverty.

The ancestry of the CDP was 37.1% English, 32.1% Irish, 16.4% Polish, 15.1% American, 5.7% Scotch-Irish, and 5.0% Italian.

Historical population
Census	Pop.	Note	%±
2020	322		—
U.S. Decennial Census
