= South Otselic Historic District =

Historic district in New York, United States

- U.S. National Register of Historic Places
- U.S. Historic district
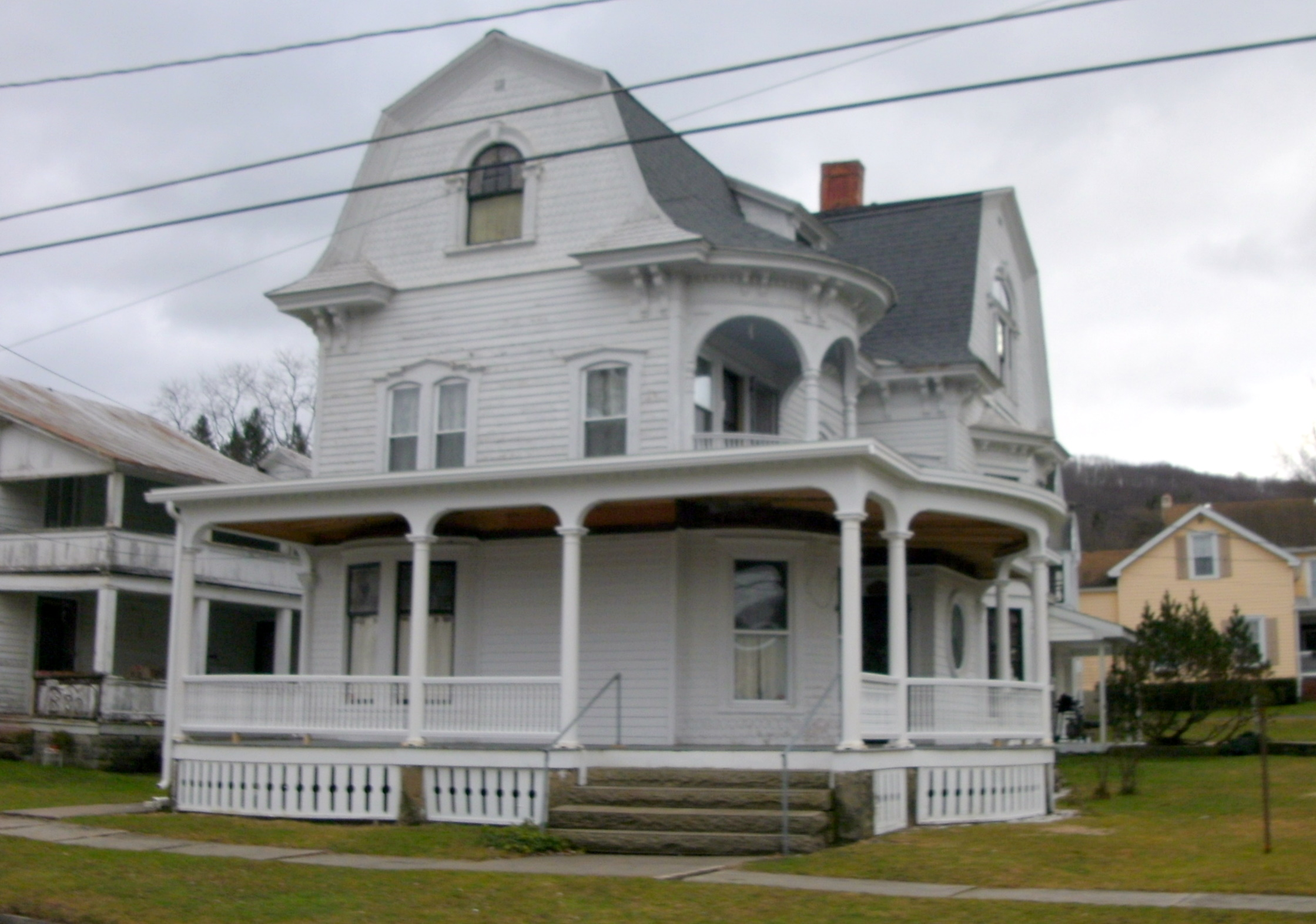
- Former Gladding Mansion, November 2010

- Location within New York Location within the United States
- Location: Gladding, N. and S. Main Sts., Clarence Church and Plank Rds., and Potter Ave., South Otselic, New York
- Coordinates: 42°38′48″N 75°46′52″W
- Area: 33 acres (13 ha)
- Built: 1800
- Architect: Multiple
- Architectural style: Late Victorian, Mixed (more Than 2 Styles From Different Periods)
- NRHP reference No.: 83001663
- Added to NRHP: September 8, 1983

South Otselic Historic District is a national historic district located at South Otselic in Chenango County, New York. The district includes 60 contributing buildings. It encompasses the hamlet's historic core and includes commercial, residential, ecclesiastical, and industrial buildings. Among the notable buildings are the Methodist Church (ca. 1867), Gladding Corporation factory and office (1895), J. Brown Grist Mill (ca. 1810), Noonan's Blacksmith Shop (1870), Cox Block (1890, destroyed by fire on December 14, 2014), and Dew Drop Building (now post office, 1896). Notable residences include the Octagon House (ca. 1860) and the Queen Anne style Former Gladding Mansion (ca. 1880).

It was added to the National Register of Historic Places in 1983.

The Cox Block built in 1890 burnt to the ground on December 14, 2014. After a grease fire started in one of the first floor apartments.

== See also ==
- National Register of Historic Places listings in Chenango County, New York

== Gallery ==
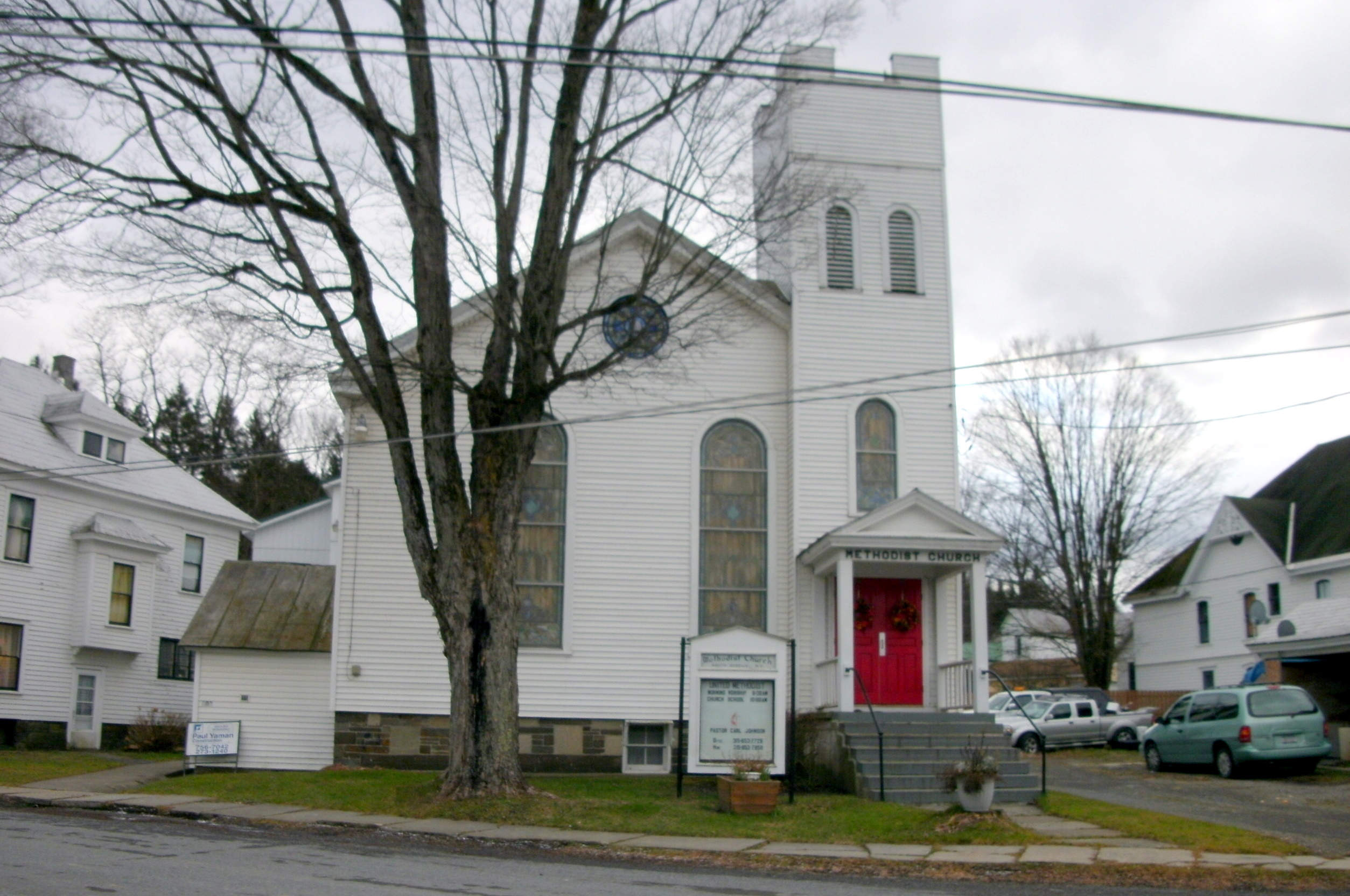
Methodist Church, November 2010

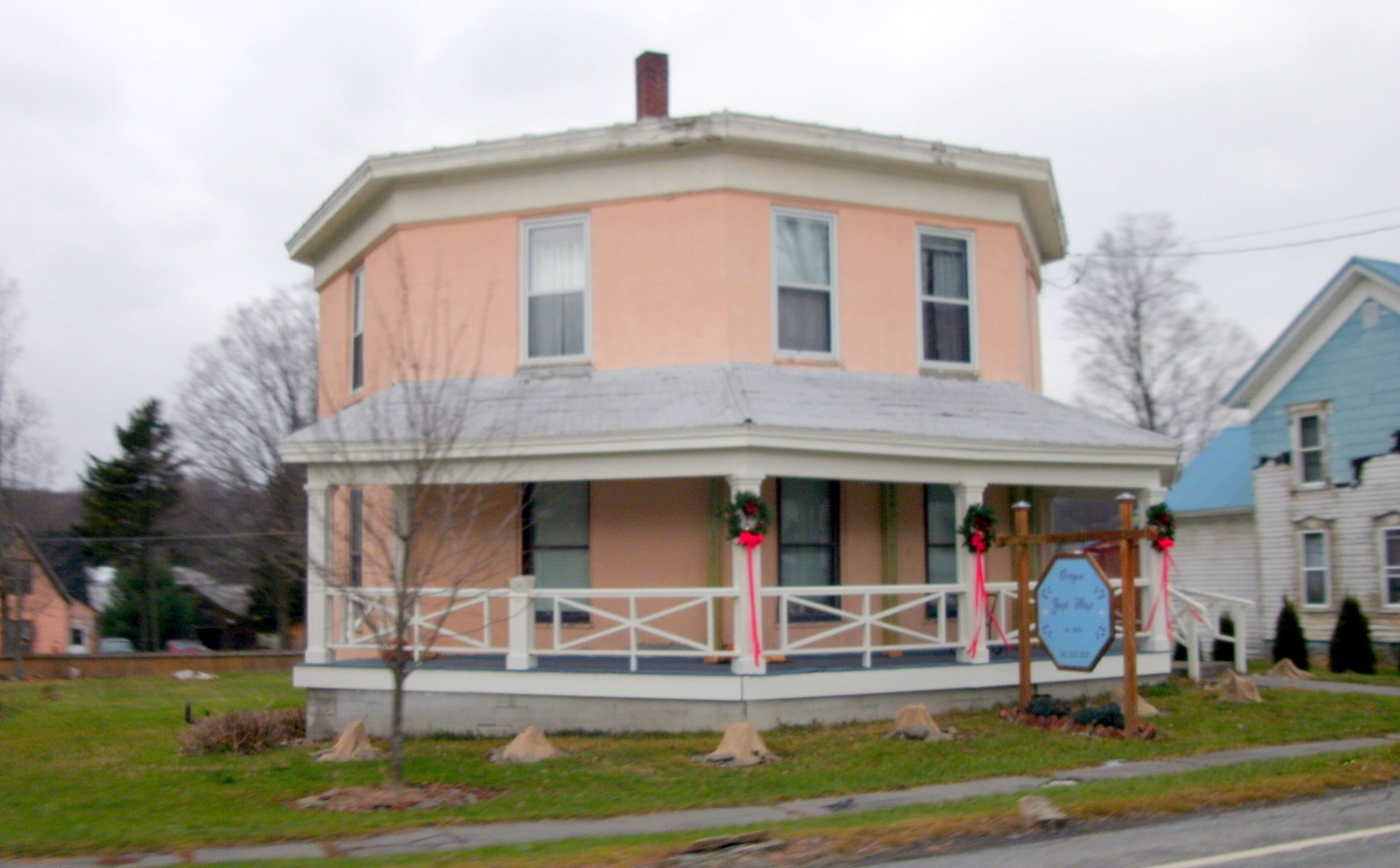
Octagon House, November 2010

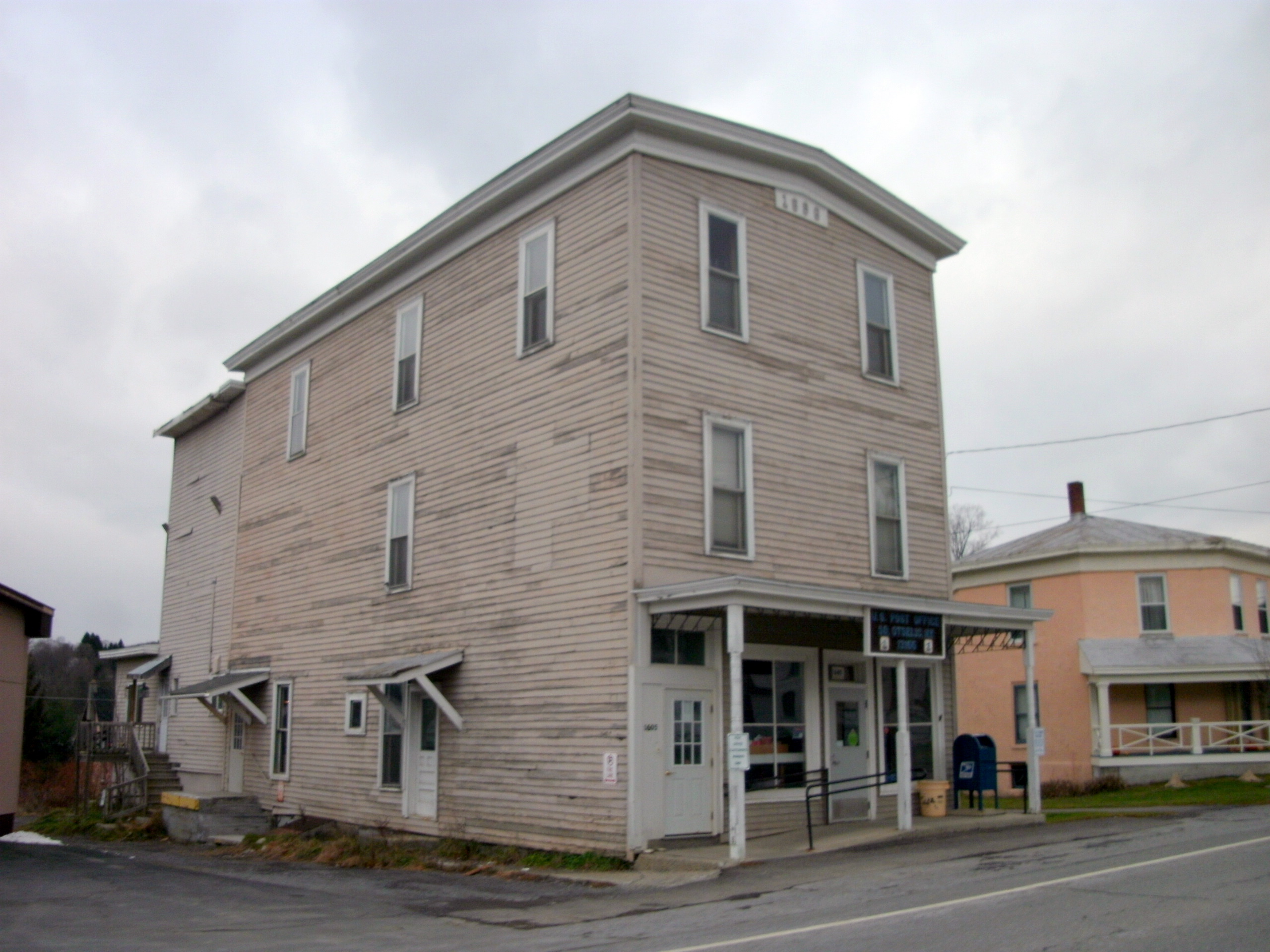
Dew Drop Building, November 2010
