= United States Post Office (Norwich, New York) =

- U.S. Post Office
- U.S. National Register of Historic Places
- New York State Register of Historic Places
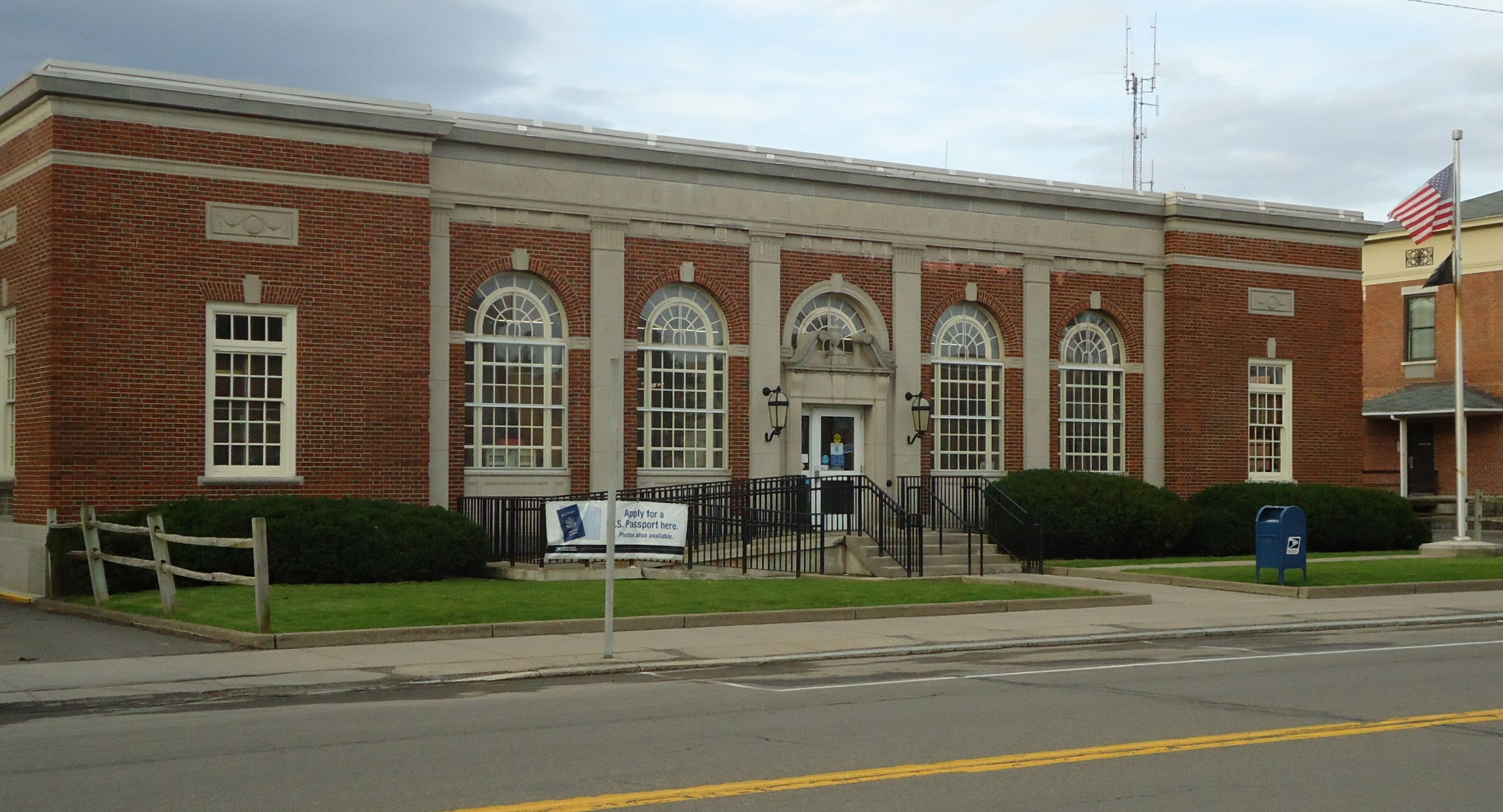
- North elevation, 2012

- Location within New York Location within the United States
- Location: 20-22 E. Main St., Norwich, New York
- Coordinates: 42°31′51″N 75°31′20″W
- Area: less than one acre
- Built: 1932
- Architect: George Ketcham
- Architectural style: Colonial Revival
- MPS: US Post Offices in New York State, 1858-1943, TR
- NRHP reference No.: 88002380
- NYSRHP No.: 01740.000025

Significant dates
- Added to NRHP: May 11, 1989
- Designated NYSRHP: June 23, 1980

US Post Office-Norwich is a historic post office building located at Norwich in Chenango County, New York, United States. It was built in 1932–1933, and is one of a number of post offices in New York State built by the Office of the Supervising Architect of the Treasury Department. It was designed by architect George Ketcham of Syracuse. It is a one-story brick building ornamented with elaborate cast stone details in the Colonial Revival style. It is located within the Chenango County Courthouse District.

It was listed on the National Register of Historic Places in 1989.

== See also ==
- National Register of Historic Places listings in Chenango County, New York
