= Guilford Lake (New York) =

- Location within New York Location within the United States
- Location: Chenango County, New York, United States
- Coordinates: 42°24′34″N 75°29′45″W
- Type: Lake
- Basin countries: United States
- Surface area: 70 acres (0.28 km^{2})
- Average depth: 19 feet (5.8 m)
- Max. depth: 66 ft (20 m)
- Shore length^{1}: 1.5 miles (2.4 km)
- Surface elevation: 1,558 ft (475 m)
- Settlements: Guilford, New York
- ^{1} Shore length is not a well-defined measure.

Guilford Lake is located near Guilford, New York. Fish species present in the lake include black crappie, brown trout, pickerel, pumpkinseed sunfish, rock bass, white sucker, yellow perch, rainbow trout, largemouth bass, and walleye. There is access via state owned carry down off County Route 35, on the southeast shore by the outlet.
