= Methodist-Episcopal Church of Norwich =

Historic church in New York, United States

- U.S. National Register of Historic Places
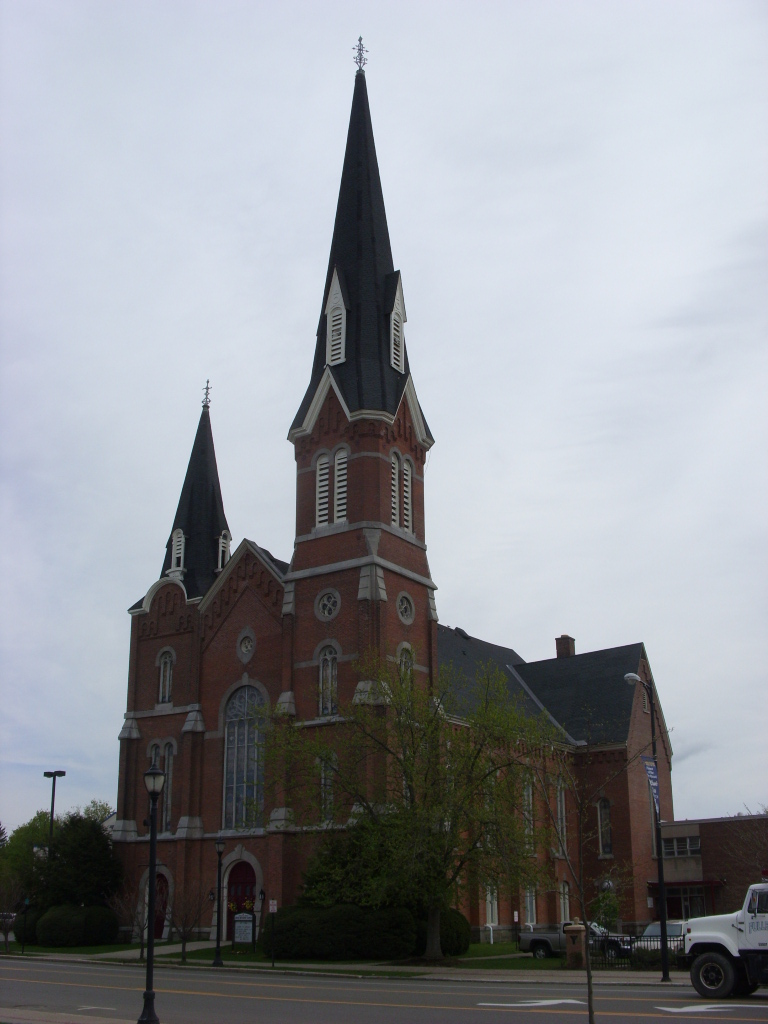
- Methodist-Episcopal Church of Norwich, May 2009

- Location within New York Location within the United States
- Location: 74 N. Broad St., Norwich, New York
- Coordinates: 42°32′1″N 75°31′26″W
- Area: less than one acre
- Built: 1873
- Architect: Perry, Isaac G.; Sternberg, William H.
- Architectural style: Late Victorian
- NRHP reference No.: 03000846
- Added to NRHP: August 28, 2003

Methodist-Episcopal Church of Norwich is a historic Methodist Episcopal church located at 74 N. Broad Street in Norwich, Chenango County, New York. It was designed by architect Isaac G. Perry and built 1873–1875. It is a large, two story brick structure, generally rectangular in shape (110 feet long by 64 feet wide) with a cross gabled transept (76 feet wide by 12 feet deep). The front facade features two engaged towers with a large, central round arched entrance. The north tower is surmounted by a 115-foot octagonal spire. The south tower includes a belfry and 190 foot spire.

It was added to the National Register of Historic Places in 2003.
