= Earlville Historic District =

Historic district in New York, United States

- U.S. National Register of Historic Places
- U.S. Historic district
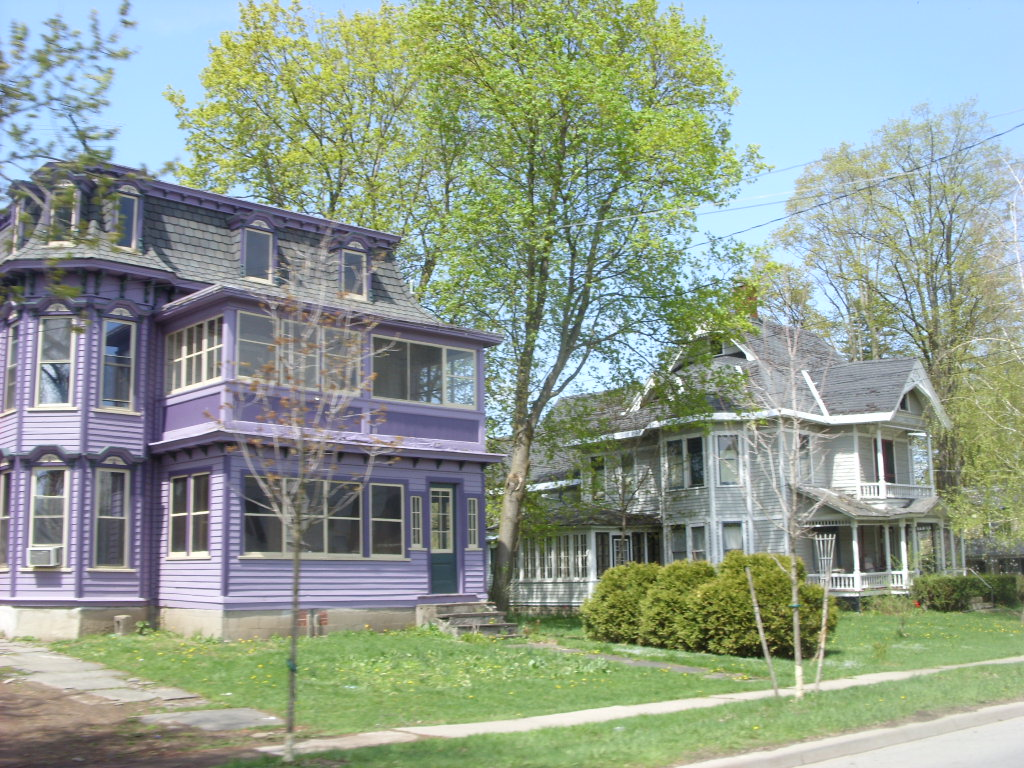
- Houses at Earlsville, May 2009

- Location within New York Location within the United States
- Location: Fayette, N., S., E., and W. Main Sts., Earlville, New York
- Coordinates: 42°44′25″N 75°32′42″W
- Area: 85 acres (34 ha)
- Built: 1830
- Architect: Multiple
- Architectural style: Second Empire, Italianate, Late Gothic Revival
- NRHP reference No.: 82001096
- Added to NRHP: October 29, 1982

Earlville Historic District is a national historic district located at Earlville in Chenango and Madison County, New York. The district contains 164 contributing buildings. It includes the commercial area at the center of the village and residential areas on the main thoroughfares and two side streets. Most of the buildings in the district were built between 1880 and 1920. Located within the district is the separately listed Earlville Opera House.

It was added to the National Register of Historic Places in 1982.
