= Emmanuel Episcopal Church Complex =

Historic church in New York, United States

- U.S. National Register of Historic Places
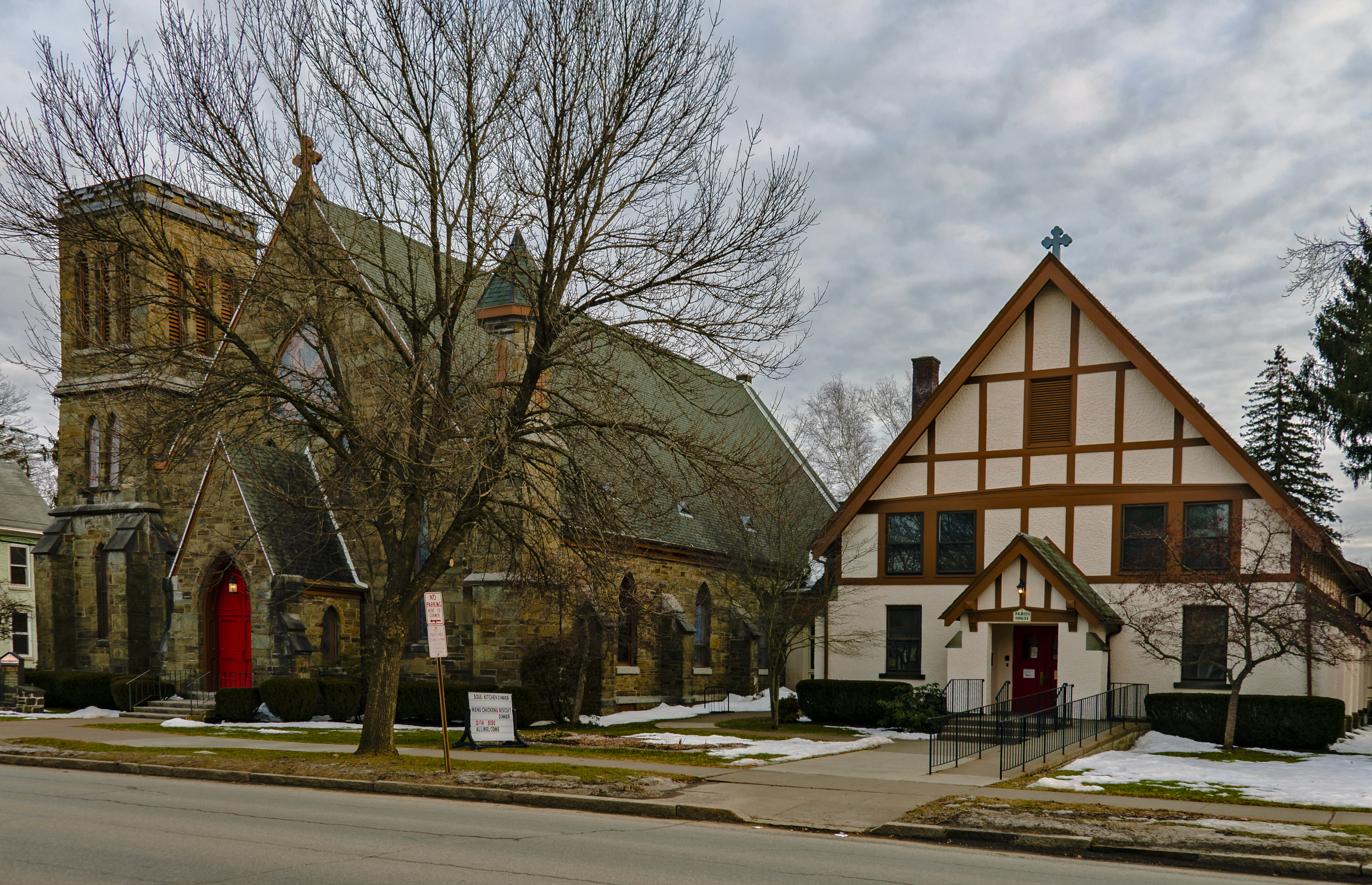
- North elevations of church and parish house, 2019

- Location within New York Location within the United States
- Location: 37 W. Main St., Norwich, New York
- Coordinates: 42°31′49.72″N 75°31′38.14″W
- Area: 0.9 acres (0.36 ha)
- Built: 1874
- Architect: Perry, Isaac G.
- Architectural style: Gothic Revival
- NRHP reference No.: 09000654
- Added to NRHP: August 26, 2009

Emmanuel Episcopal Church Complex is a historic Episcopal church complex located at 37 W. Main Street in Norwich, Chenango County, New York. The complex consists of the church, parish hall, and education building. The church was designed by architect Isaac G. Perry and built in 1874 in the Gothic Revival style. It is a one-story, rectangular limestone structure, 116 feet long and 62 feet wide. The main facade features two square, engaged towers of uneven heights. The parish hall was built in 1915 and expanded with the education building.

It was added to the National Register of Historic Places in 2009.
