= Smyrna Elementary School =

- U.S. National Register of Historic Places
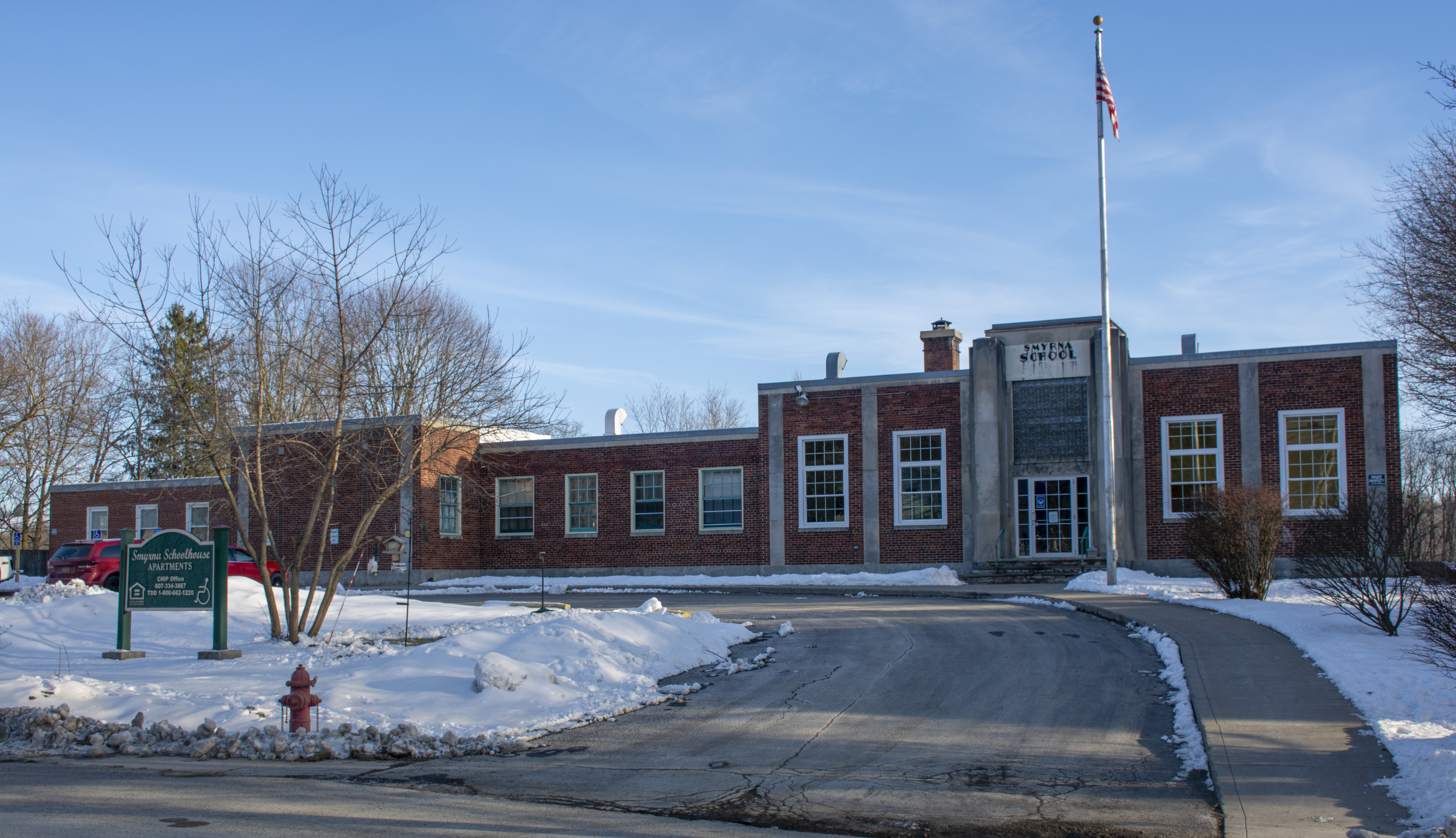

- Location within New York Location within the United States
- Location: School St., SE of NY 80, Smyrna, New York
- Coordinates: 42°41′10″N 75°34′12″W
- Area: 3.9 acres (1.6 ha)
- Built: 1941
- Architect: Gordon Wright
- Architectural style: Moderne
- NRHP reference No.: 96001428
- Added to NRHP: December 16, 1996

Smyrna Elementary School is a historic elementary school building located at Smyrna in Chenango County, New York. The original 86,000-square-foot (8,000 m^{2}), L-shaped school was constructed in 1941. In 1956, a 4,650-square-foot (432 m^{2}) addition was completed in two sections; a classroom section to the east and small kitchen addition to the south. It is a single-story building with basement and mezzanine work space. The building is in the Art Moderne style. The school closed in the late 1970s after consolidation in the Sherburne-Earlville Central School.

It was added to the National Register of Historic Places in 1996.
