= Young Round Barn =

- U.S. National Register of Historic Places
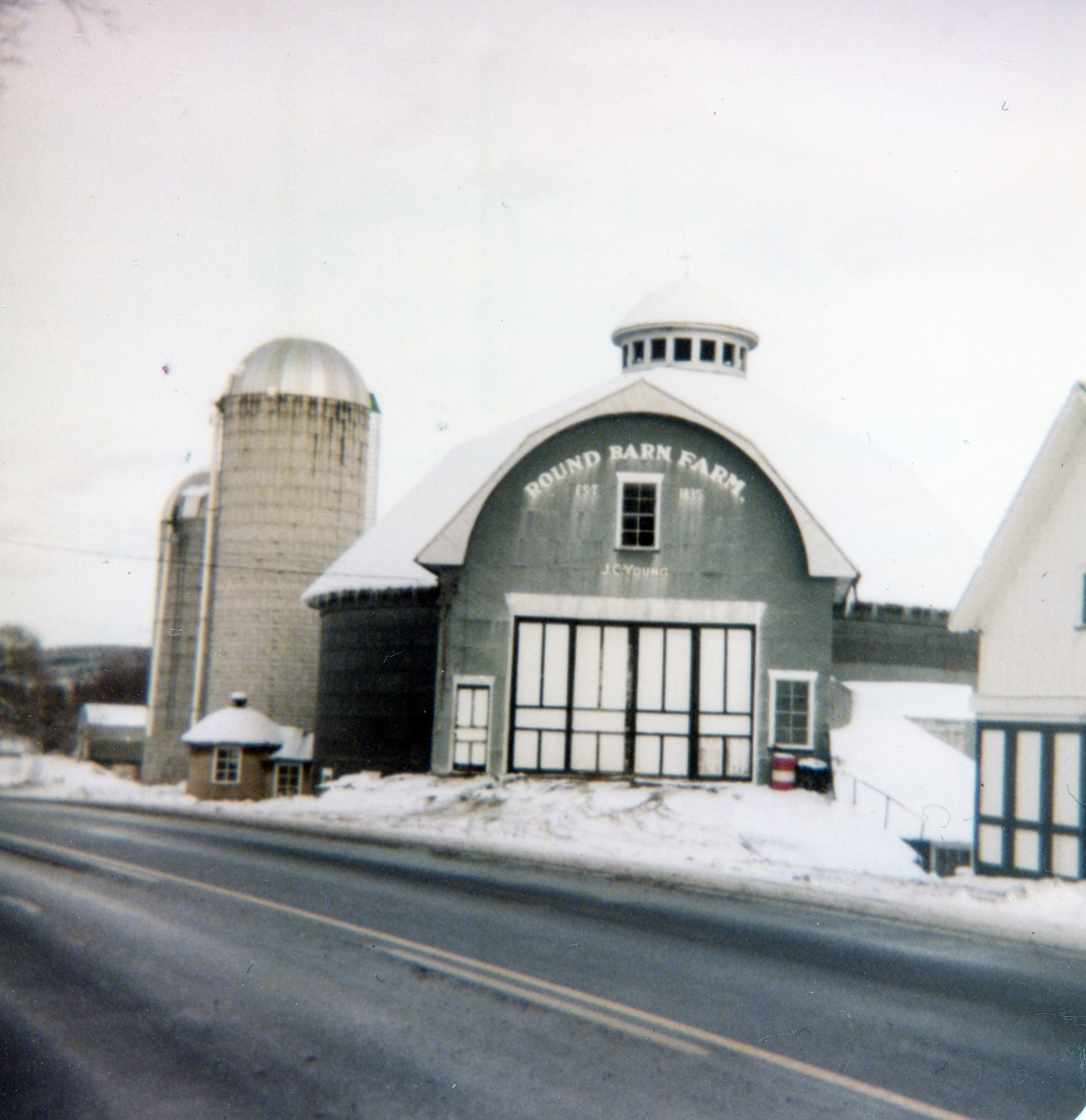
- Barn in 1978

- Location within New York Location within the United States
- Nearest city: Greene, New York
- Coordinates: 42°17′39″N 75°48′28″W
- Area: less than one acre
- Built: 1914
- Built by: Bates, DeVern
- Architectural style: Round Barn
- MPS: Central Plan Dairy Barns of New York TR
- NRHP reference No.: 84002072
- Added to NRHP: September 29, 1984

Young Round Barn is a historic round barn at Greene in Chenango County, New York built in 1914. It is located on ‘’’Round Barn Farm’’’.

== Design ==
The barn was built by DeVern Bates for James Clifford Young after his previous barn burned down in 1914. Bates was familiar with circular barn design having designed one for the University of Illinois in 1910. It is a two-story structure, with a large square entrance bay, and a diameter of 80 feet (24 m). It is covered by a conical, two slope gambrel roof topped with a circular cupola venting the loft and central silo. DeVern Bates also built the nearby Bates Round Barn.

It was added to the National Register of Historic Places in 1984.
