= Guilford Center Cemetery =

Historic cemetery in New York state, US

- U.S. National Register of Historic Places
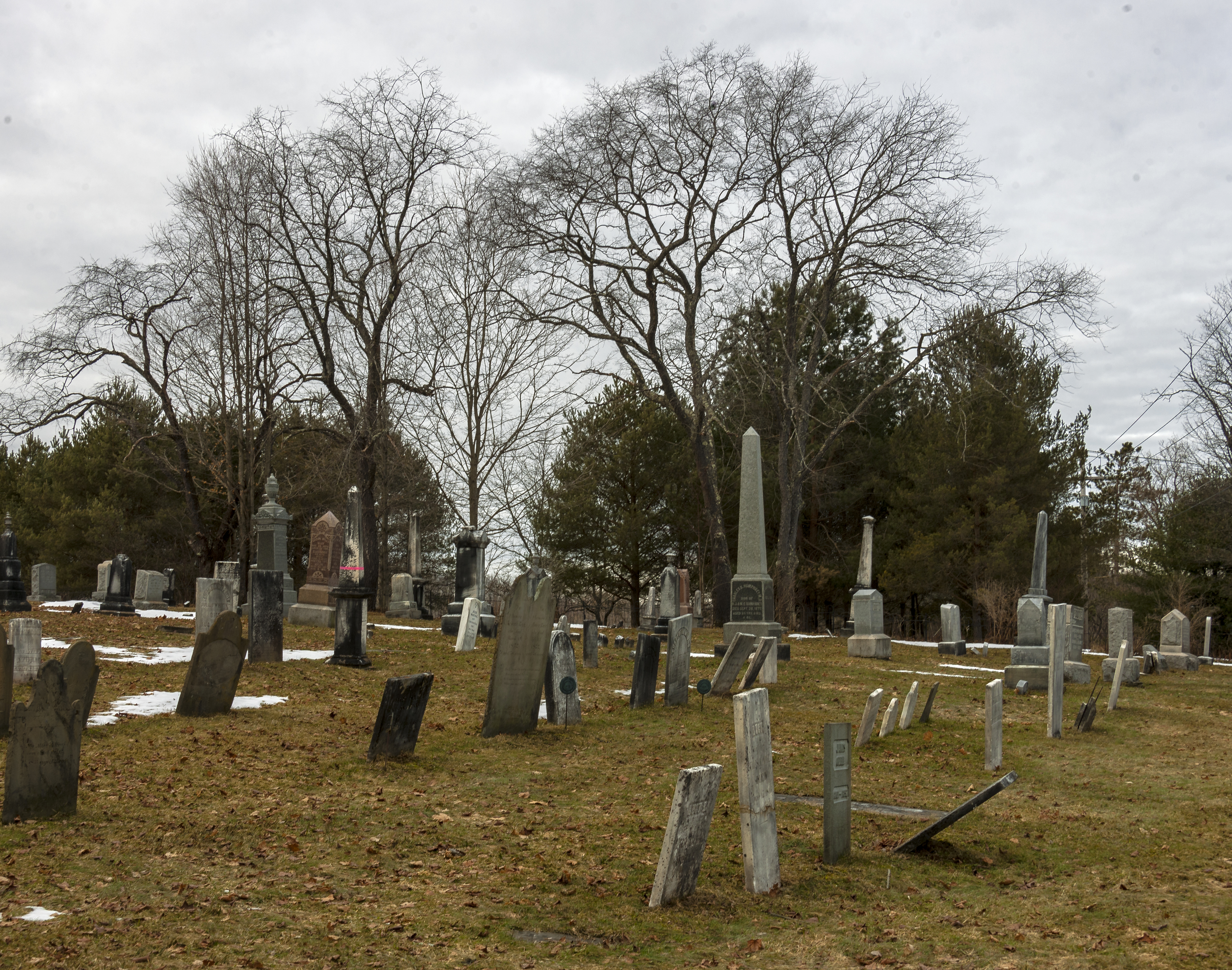
- View across cemetery from southeast, 2019

- Location within New York Location within the United States
- Location: Cty Rte. 36, Guilford Center, New York
- Coordinates: 42°24′29″N 75°27′55″W
- Area: 1.3 acres (0.53 ha)
- NRHP reference No.: 05001129
- Added to NRHP: October 05, 2005

Guilford Center Cemetery is a historic cemetery at Guilford Center in Chenango County, New York. The cemetery contains approximately 427 burials, with 318 markers, Some are fallen or broken. The historical society's cemetery committee works hard to maintain the markers. The earliest burial dates to 1809.

It was added to the National Register of Historic Places in 2005.
