= Newton Homestead =

Historic house in New York, United States

- U.S. National Register of Historic Places
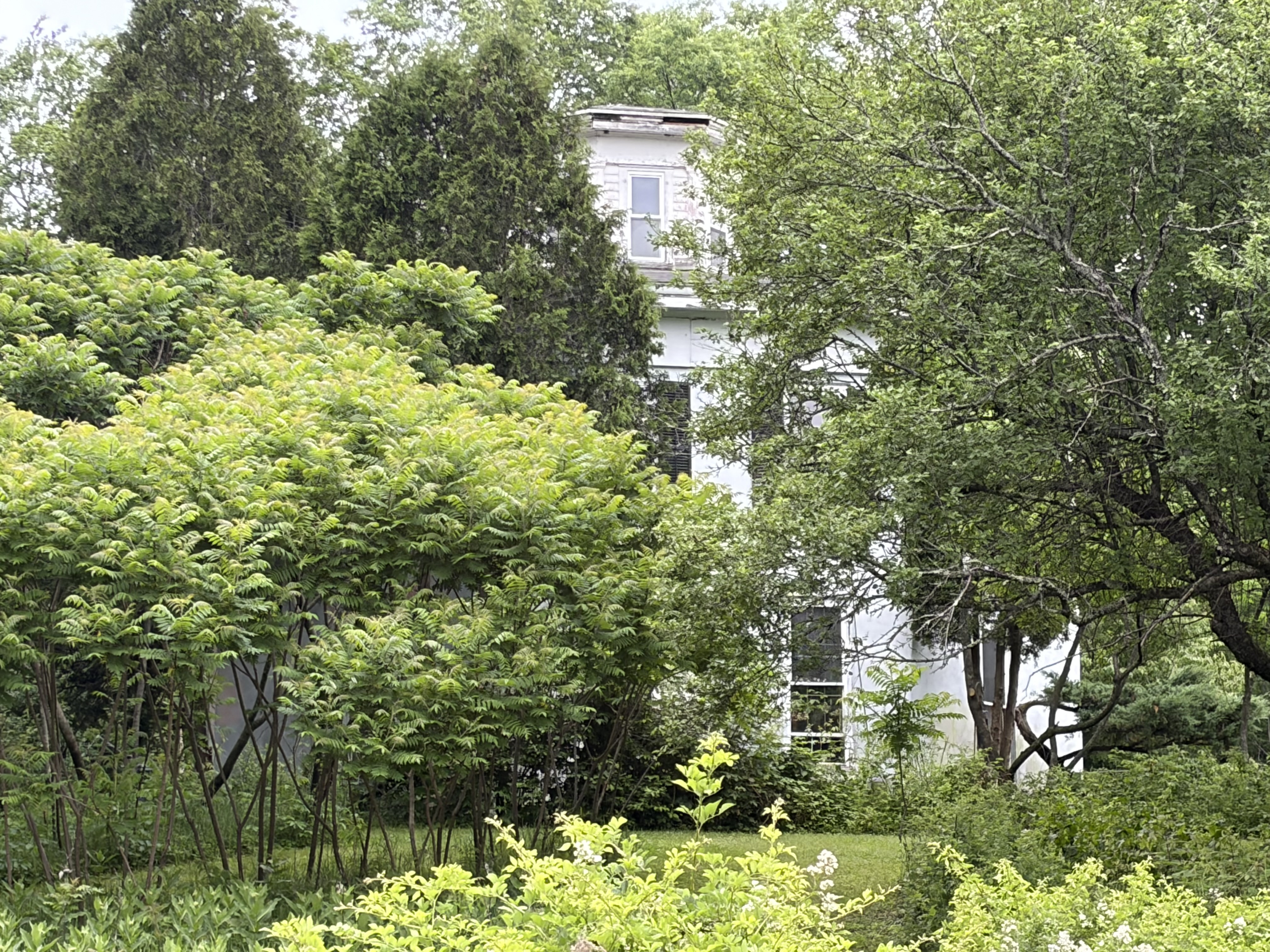
- The octagon house viewed from Ridge Road

- Location within New York Location within the United States
- Location: Ridge Rd., South Otselic, New York
- Coordinates: 42°39′4″N 75°47′8″W
- Area: 5 acres (2.0 ha)
- Built: c. 1860
- Built by: Newton, Leroy & Courtland
- Architectural style: Octagon Mode
- NRHP reference No.: 82003351
- Added to NRHP: June 3, 1982

The Newton Homestead is a historic octagon house located on Ridge Road in the South Otselic hamlet of the town of Otselic, Chenango County, New York. It was built about 1860 by Leroy and Courtland Newton, and is a two-story, rubble filled concrete building sheathed in stucco. It has a hipped roof topped by an octagonal wooden cupola. Today it is a private residence but was for years the Gladding International Sport Fishing Museum.

On June 3, 1982, it was added to the National Register of Historic Places.
