= Bates Round Barn =

- U.S. National Register of Historic Places
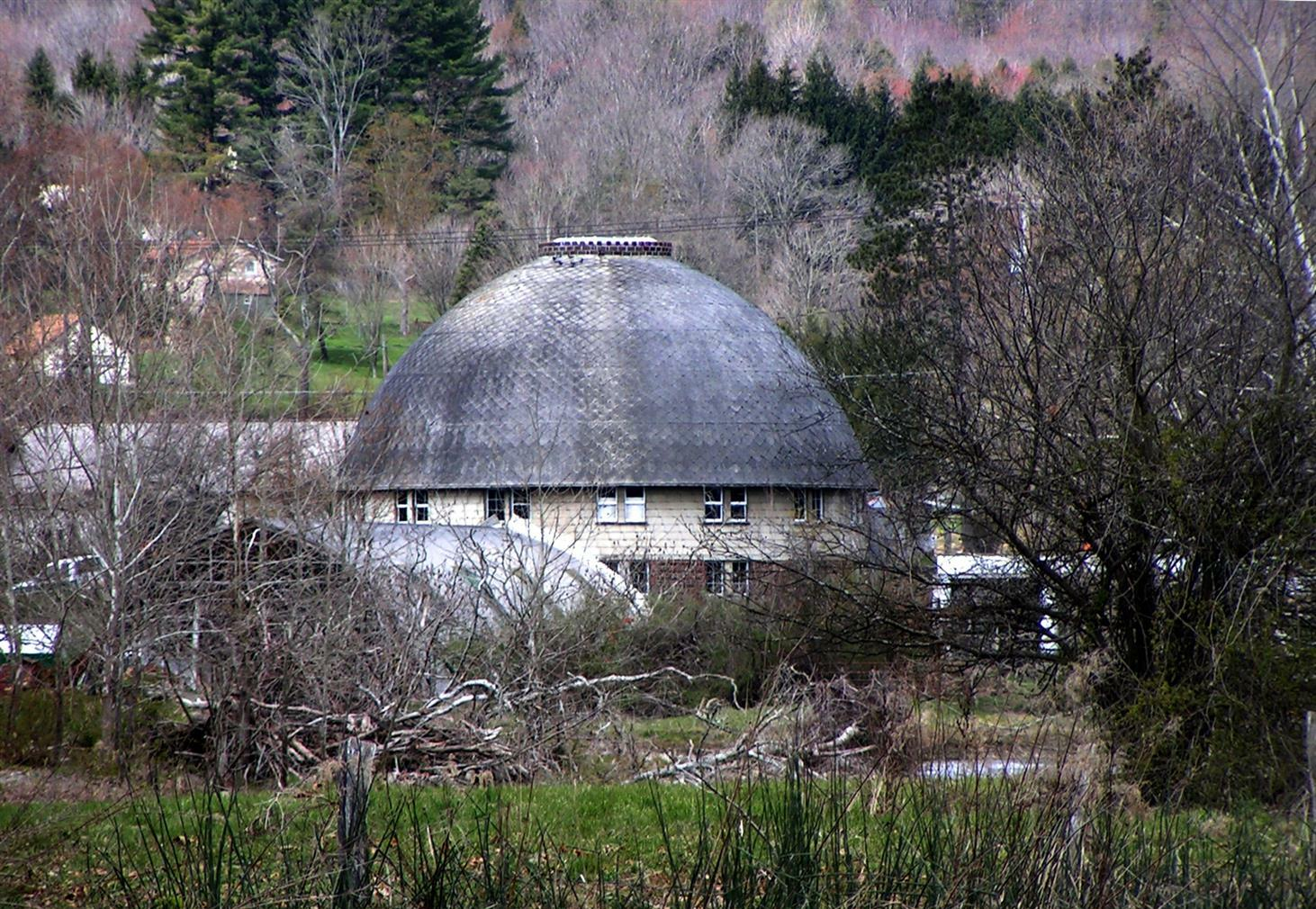

- Location within New York Location within the United States
- Nearest city: Greene, New York
- Coordinates: 42°18′10″N 75°48′7″W
- Area: 2 acres (0.81 ha)
- Built: 1928
- Architect: Bates, DeVern
- Architectural style: Round Barn
- MPS: Central Plan Dairy Barns of New York TR
- NRHP reference No.: 84002071
- Added to NRHP: September 29, 1984

Bates Round Barn is a historic round barn at Greene in Chenango County, New York. It was built in 1928 and is a three-story structure, with attic, and a diameter of 60 feet. It is covered by a domical roof and the interior silo, built of tile, is topped by a ventilator. DeVern Bates also built the nearby Young Round Barn.

It was added to the National Register of Historic Places in 1984.
