= Smyrna, New York =

- Town
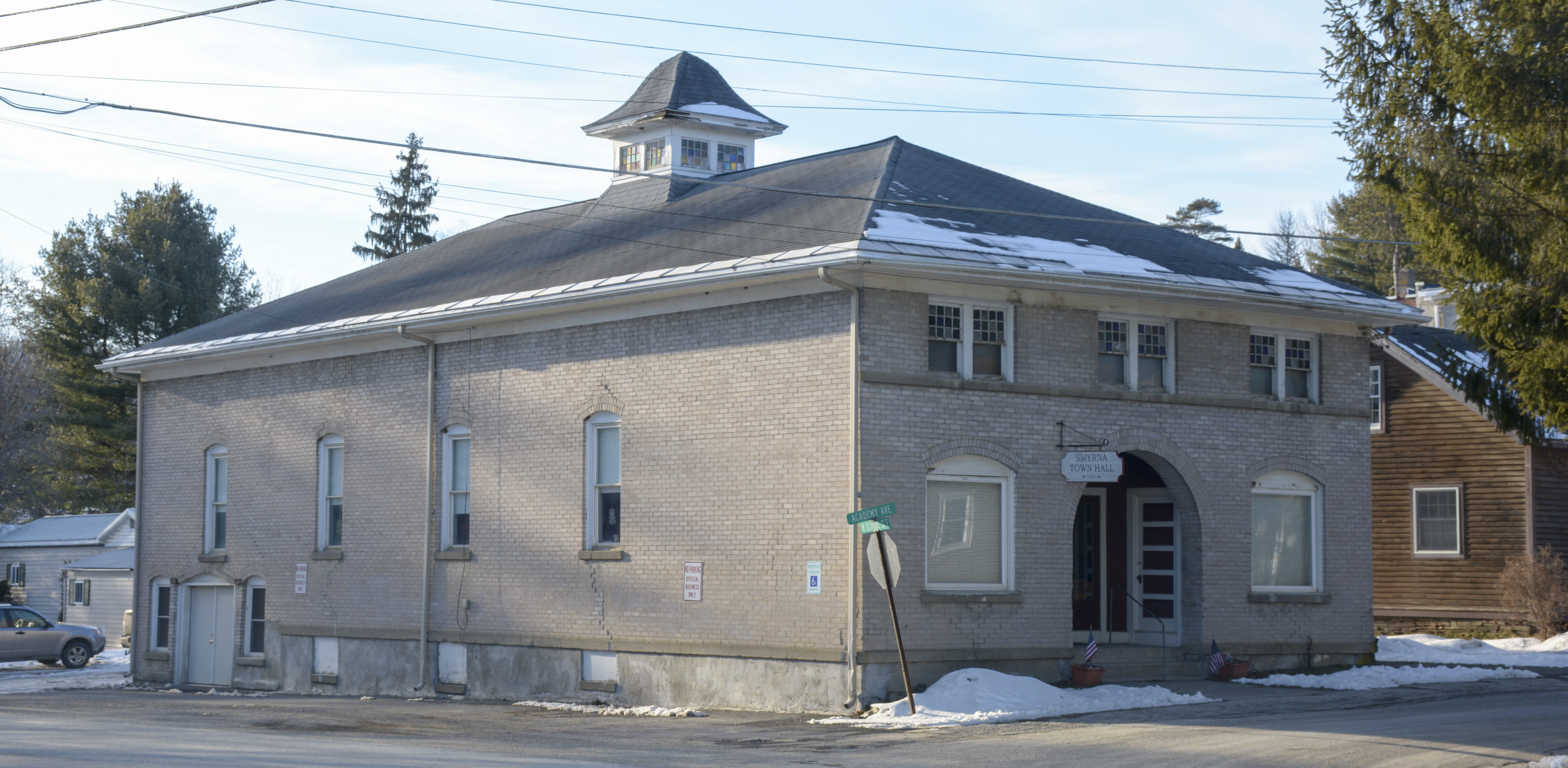
- Smyrna Town Hall

- Location in the state of New York
- Coordinates: 42°41′14″N 75°34′14″W
- Country: United States
- State: New York
- County: Chenango

Government
  - Type: Town Council
  - Town Supervisor: Michael Khoury (R)
  - Town Council: Members' List: • Eric J. Graham (R); • Wayne C. Simmons (R); • Robert L. Matteson (R); • Mark E. Swayze (D)

Area
  - Total: 42.16 sq mi (109.20 km^{2})
  - Land: 42.09 sq mi (109.00 km^{2})
  - Water: 0.077 sq mi (0.20 km^{2})
- Elevation: 1,210 ft (370 m)

Population (2010)
  - Total: 1,280
  - Estimate (2016): 1,256
  - Density: 29.8/sq mi (11.52/km^{2})
- Time zone: Eastern (EST)
- ZIP Codes: 13464 (Smyrna); 13332 (Earlville); 13832 (Plymouth)
- FIPS code: 36-017-68110
- Website: www.townofsmyrnany.gov

Smyrna is a town in Chenango County, New York, United States. The population was 1,280 at the 2010 census. Smyrna is named after a coastal city in ancient Greece, nowadays modern Izmir in Turkey.

The town contains a village also named Smyrna. The town is on the county's northern border.

== History ==
The land was settled around 1792. The town of Smyrna was founded in 1808 as "Stafford" from part of the town of Sherburne. Within a month, the name was changed to "Smyrna".

The Smyrna Elementary School was listed on the National Register of Historic Places in 1996. The Smyrna Town Hall-Opera House was listed in 2008.

== Geography ==
According to the United States Census Bureau, the town has a total area of 42.2 square miles (109.2 km^{2}), of which 42.1 square miles (109.0 km^{2}) is land and 0.08 square miles (0.2 km^{2}), or 0.18%, is water.

The northern town line is the border of Madison County.

New York State Route 80 is an east-west highway in the town.

== Demographics ==
Historical population
Census	Pop.	Note	%±
1820	1,390		—
1830	1,897		36.5%
1840	2,246		18.4%
1850	1,940		−13.6%
1860	1,822		−6.1%
1870	1,668		−8.5%
1880	1,651		−1.0%
1890	1,396		−15.4%
1900	1,290		−7.6%
1910	1,205		−6.6%
1920	1,058		−12.2%
1930	1,020		−3.6%
1940	971		−4.8%
1950	996		2.6%
1960	1,055		5.9%
1970	1,106		4.8%
1980	1,142		3.3%
1990	1,265		10.8%
2000	1,418		12.1%
2010	1,280		−9.7%
2016 (est.)	1,256	▼	−1.9%
U.S. Decennial Census

As of the census of 2000, there were 1,418 people, 472 households, and 371 families residing in the town. The population density was 33.7 inhabitants per square mile (13.0/km^{2}). There were 608 housing units at an average density of 14.4 per square mile (5.6/km^{2}). The racial makeup of the town was 98.45% White, 0.92% Native American, 0.14% Asian, and 0.49% from two or more races. Hispanic or Latino of any race were 0.28% of the population.

There were 472 households, out of which 40.0% had children under the age of 18 living with them, 63.1% were married couples living together, 7.2% had a female householder with no husband present, and 21.2% were non-families. 16.3% of all households were made up of individuals, and 6.8% had someone living alone who was 65 years of age or older. The average household size was 3.00 and the average family size was 3.35.

In the town, the population was spread out, with 32.2% under the age of 18, 6.8% from 18 to 24, 28.9% from 25 to 44, 23.2% from 45 to 64, and 8.9% who were 65 years of age or older. The median age was 34 years. For every 100 females, there were 103.2 males. For every 100 females age 18 and over, there were 108.2 males.

The median income for a household in the town was $31,607, and the median income for a family was $34,125. Males had a median income of $25,313 versus $21,111 for females. The per capita income for the town was $11,541. About 16.6% of families and 17.8% of the population were below the poverty line, including 20.5% of those under age 18 and 14.4% of those age 65 or over.

== Communities and locations in the Town of Smyrna ==
Maps of Earlville (village) and Smyrna (village); 1875

- Beaver Meadow – A hamlet at the western town line on County Road 16.
- Bonney – A hamlet in the northwestern part of the town on NY Route 80.
- Pleasant Brook – A stream flowing eastward through the center of the town. It is a tributary of the Chenango River, part of the Susquehanna River watershed.
- Sherburne Four Corners – A hamlet on County Road 20 on the town line at the southeastern corner of the town so that it is situated in four towns of the county.
- Smyrna – The village of Smyrna on NY-80 at County Road 20.
- Upperville – A hamlet northwest of Smyrna village on NY-80. It is the location of the historic Upperville Meeting House, added to the National Register of Historic Places in 2002.

== Notable people ==
- Willard W. Isham, Wisconsin state assemblyman
- Milo Kelsey, Wisconsin state assemblyman
- William H. Kelsey (1812–1879), US congressman
- Charlie Palmer, chef
- Arthur A. Taylor (1849–1923) newspaper publisher and editor in Santa Cruz, California; born in Smyrna
- Brigham Young (1801–1877), religious leader of Latter Day Saint; lived in Smyrna as a child. A historical marker at the corner of County Route 21 and Cole Road indicates the approximate former location of his boyhood home.
