= Otselic, New York =

- Town
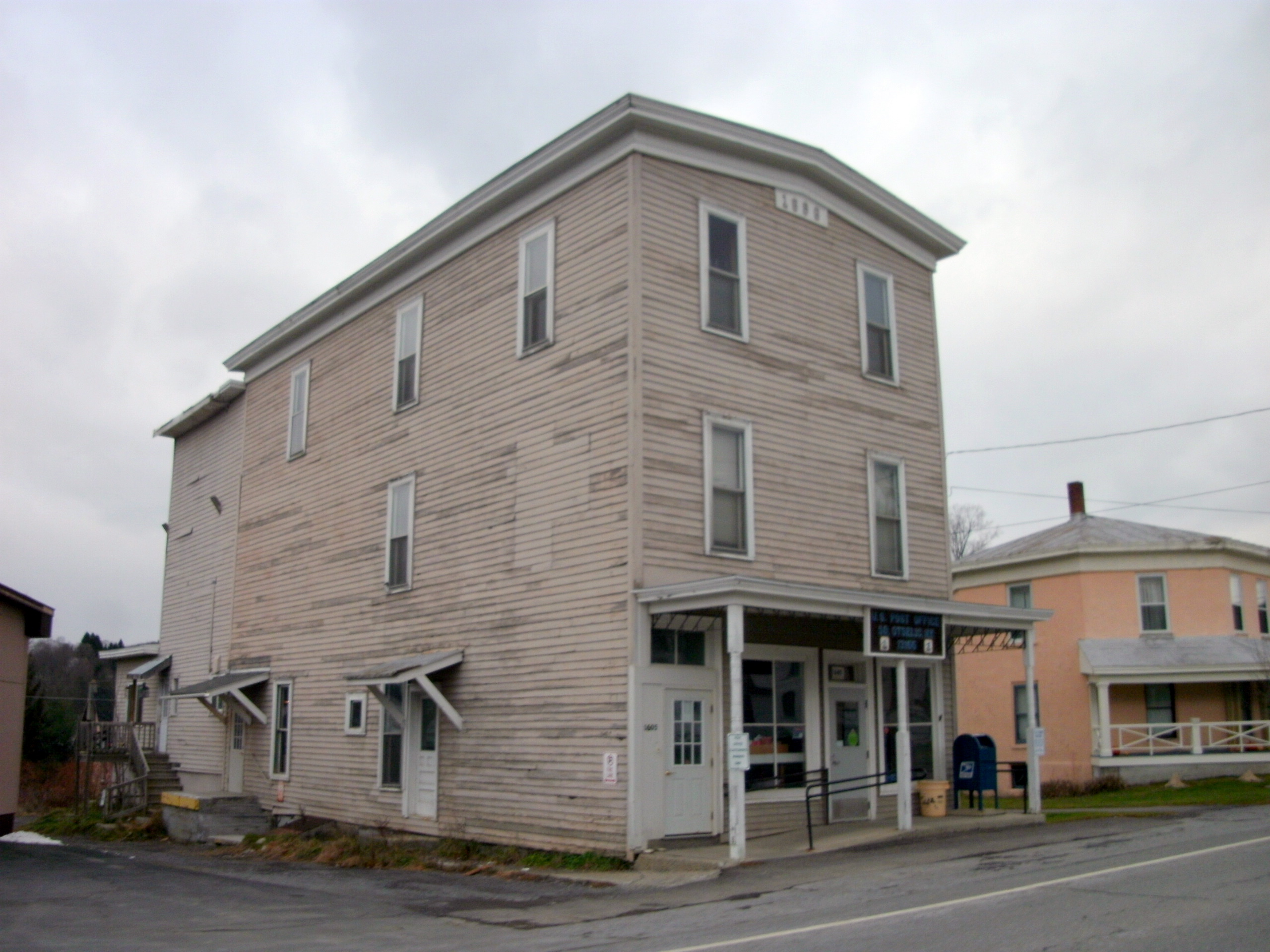
- U.S. Post Office (Dew Drop Building), South Otselic, November 2010

- Location within New York Location within the United States
- Coordinates: 42°41′29″N 75°44′11″W
- Country: United States
- State: New York
- County: Chenango

Government
  - Type: Town Council
  - Town Supervisor: Evan Williams (R)
  - Town Council: Members' List: • Louise Perry (D); • Hugh Comfort (R); • Herbert W. Neal (R); • Charles Bishop, Jr. (R)

Area
  - Total: 38.04 sq mi (98.52 km^{2})
  - Land: 37.98 sq mi (98.36 km^{2})
  - Water: 0.062 sq mi (0.16 km^{2})
- Elevation: 1,650 ft (503 m)

Population (2010)
  - Total: 1,054
  - Estimate (2016): 1,023
  - Density: 27/sq mi (10.4/km^{2})
- Time zone: UTC-5 (Eastern (EST))
  - Summer (DST): UTC-4 (EDT)
- ZIP Codes: 13072 (Georgetown); 13155 (South Otselic); 13464 (Smyrna); 13832 (Plymouth)
- FIPS code: 36-017-55717
- GNIS feature ID: 0979330
- Website: www.townofotselic.org

Otselic is a town in Chenango County, New York, United States, situated on the northern border of Chenango County, northwest of the city of Norwich. The population of the town was 1,054 at the 2010 census. The town is named after a river flowing through it, the Otselic, which is an Oneida word for "place of wild plums". The Otselic valley is the predominant geographic feature in the town, connecting it to the surrounding region north and south.

== History ==
The first settler arrived around 1800. Many of the original settlers came from Connecticut and Massachusetts. The town of Otselic was founded in 1817 from part of the town of German. The year 1833 was notable for a tornado that passed over the town and measured over a mile in width.

== Geography ==
According to the United States Census Bureau, the town has a total area of 38.0 square miles (98.5 km^{2}), of which 38.0 square miles (98.4 km^{2}) is land and 0.08 square miles (0.2 km^{2}), or 0.18%, is water.

Over 10 square miles (26 km^{2}) or about 7,000 acres (2,800 ha) are state-owned forest lands dedicated to the production of forest products and open to the public for forest-related recreation such as hunting, camping, fishing, hiking and cross country skiing.

The highest altitude is just over 2,000 feet (610 m) above sea level along the southern town line, rising from the lowest elevation of approximately 1,200 feet (370 m) at the bottom of the Otselic Valley.

The northern town line is the border of Madison County.

The Otselic River (sometimes "Otselic Creek") runs through the town and later flows into the Tioughnioga River as part of the Susquehanna River watershed of Chesapeake Bay.

New York State Route 26 intersects New York State Route 80 at Otselic hamlet.

== Wildlife ==
Formerly most of the land was in agriculture, chiefly dairy. Since the end of the nineteenth century, farm abandonment has increased, and today forest cover and early succession forest regrowth dominate the landscape mixed with remaining dairy farms. The forest cover is mixed hardwoods (maple, cherry, ash, beech, basswood, birch and hemlock) occurring naturally and large plantations of spruce and pine on state-owned lands. White pine was common prior to European settlement, but due to the high demand for its clear, light, easily worked lumber, pine stands were removed during the nineteenth century and today are almost totally absent. Logging has always been an important part of the local economy, utilizing high-value hardwoods for sawlogs as well as firewood and softwood poles and pulp.

Hunting, trapping and wildlife-related recreation such as birdwatching and wildlife viewing are important activities. Common wildlife include white-tailed deer, beaver, mink, muskrat, red squirrel, flying squirrel, gray squirrel, chipmunk, coyote, fox, skunk, raccoon, porcupine, opossum, woodchuck, bear, otter, fisher, and bobcat. Bird life is varied and rich. Turkey and grouse are plentiful and are popular game birds. During the summer breeding season, the Otselic area has over 100 breeding bird species, one of the highest numbers of breeding bird species in New York state. Bald eagles breed in the area and osprey are seen regularly along the Otselic River. Ravens are recolonizing the hills, reclaiming their historic range. Red and white winged crossbills from Canada and Alaska have bred in the large conifer plantations on New York State forest land.

== Demographics ==
Historical population
Census	Pop.	Note	%±
1820	526		—
1830	1,238		135.4%
1840	1,621		30.9%
1850	1,800		11.0%
1860	1,752		−2.7%
1870	1,733		−1.1%
1880	1,512		−12.8%
1890	1,284		−15.1%
1900	1,234		−3.9%
1910	1,104		−10.5%
1920	996		−9.8%
1930	880		−11.6%
1940	905		2.8%
1950	896		−1.0%
1960	854		−4.7%
1970	925		8.3%
1980	955		3.2%
1990	990		3.7%
2000	1,001		1.1%
2010	1,054		5.3%
2016 (est.)	1,023		−2.9%
U.S. Decennial Census

As of the census of 2010, there were 1,054 people. Today's population is about half of what it was in 1875. 356 households, and 259 families reside in the town. The population density was 26.3 inhabitants per square mile (10.2/km^{2}). There were 484 housing units at an average density of 12.7 per square mile (4.9/km^{2}). The racial makeup of the town was 98.70% White, 0.50% Native American, 0.10% Asian, 0.10% from other races, and 0.60% from two or more races. Hispanic or Latino of any race were 1.40% of the population.

There were 356 households, out of which 36.0% had children under the age of 18 living with them, 54.2% were married couples living together, 11.2% had a female householder with no husband present, and 27.0% were non-families. 19.9% of all households were made up of individuals, and 9.0% had someone living alone who was 65 years of age or older. The average household size was 2.81 and the average family size was 3.15.

In the town, the population was spread out, with 31.8% under the age of 18, 7.8% from 18 to 24, 26.9% from 25 to 44, 23.1% from 45 to 64, and 10.5% who were 65 years of age or older. The median age was 34 years. For every 100 females, there were 101.0 males. For every 100 females age 18 and over, there were 101.5 males.

The median income for a household in the town was $32,308, and the median income for a family was $34,886. Males had a median income of $30,298 versus $20,625 for females. The per capita income for the town was $14,105. About 11.2% of families and 16.0% of the population were below the poverty line, including 20.9% of those under age 18 and 10.2% of those age 65 or over.

== Communities and locations in Otselic ==
- Beaver Meadow – A hamlet in the southeastern part of the town, located on County Road 16. The name is derived from low-lying ground often flooded due to beaver dams. Originally known as Lower Beaver Meadow, it was the site of beaver dams that flooded hundreds of acres.
- The Gorge – A gorge with a brook of the same name flowing from the east into South Otselic; In 1850, a road, The Plank Road, (actually a boardwalk) of hemlock planks was built to connect South Otselic to Norwich for a distance of 19 miles (31 km).
- Mariposa – The settled area west of the hamlet of South Otselic along County Road 13.
- Otselic – The hamlet of Otselic is the first settled area of the town, near the northern town line at the junction of NY 26 and NY 80. The Otselic River passes close to the community.
- Otselic Center – A hamlet between Otselic village and Seventh Day Hollow on NY 26 at its juncture with County Road 16.
- Ratville – an area on Ratville Road which runs from Ridge Road west down a steep hill ending in the Town of Lincklaen so named for many rats at a grain mill there or many muskrats in the swamp/millpond.
- Rhode Island – A location by the western town line.
- The Ridge – the mountain running north from the hamlet of South Otselic to the Town of Georgetown, it is traversed by the Ridge Road and was called Pleasant Ridge. The south end of the Ridge is known as Miner Hill and the north end as Palmer Hill.
- Sandersonville– A location of residences along NY 26 south of the South Otselic Fish Hatchery so named for the original Sanderson Farm located there.
- Seventh Day Hollow – A hamlet northeast of South Otselic on NY 26, so named for the original settlement and church there of Seventh Day Baptists. It lies at the confluence of Bucks Brook and the Otselic River. In the 1800s, a mill run was built on the Otselic "Creek" and a side wheel built to run sawmill.
- South Otselic – A hamlet in the southwest corner of the town on NY 26 and the Otselic River at the junction with County Road 13. It was home to internationally known Gladding Fishing Line and is also the resting place of Grace Brown. In 1983, many of its historic buildings were included in the South Otselic Historic District on the National Register of Historic Places. The Newton Homestead was listed in 1982 and the Holden B. Mathewson House, which is now a bed and breakfast, in 2009. In the 1800s a dam was built on the Otselic River above the hamlet to feed a mill run that powered a saw mill and a grain mill in South Otselic. In the 1800s, the hamlet also boasted an ashery, a tannery, two hotels, an opera house, five stores, two churches, a school, and a rope and line factory (rope walk).
- South Otselic State Fish Hatchery – A fish hatchery south of South Otselic.
- Stanbro – A former hamlet northwest of Beaver Meadow, named for the Stanbro family and notably Dr. Stanbro.
- Tallet Hill – A hilltop north and west of the hamlet of South Otselic traversed by Warner Road. It was settled by the Tallet family, descendants of the first settler there, John Tallet, a Hessian soldier, stranded in America after the Revolution.
- Truman Hill – A hilltop abutting Tallet Hill on the northwest and rising from the Otselic Valley. It was so named for the Truman family that settled there.
- Upper Beaver Meadow – A hamlet formerly called Beaver Meadow at the upstream end of the beaver dammed impoundment. When the Beaver Meadow US Post office was moved from here to lower Beaver Meadow, the name went with the post office.

== Notable people ==
- George W. Ray, former US congressman
