= Upperville Meeting House =

Historic meetinghouse in New York, United States

- U.S. National Register of Historic Places
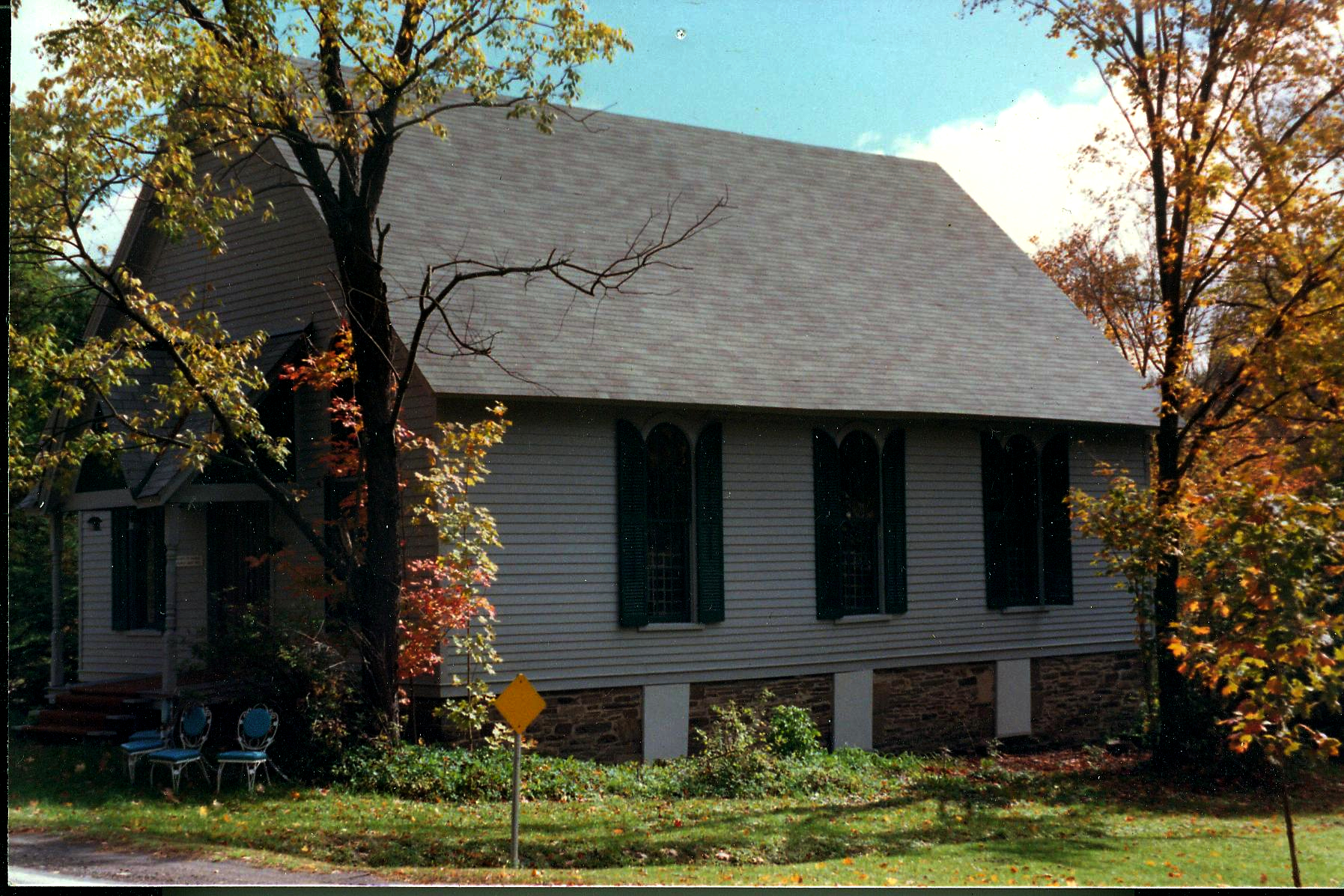
- The meeting house in autumn 1990.

- Location within New York Location within the United States
- Location: NY 80, Upperville, New York
- Coordinates: 42.700086°N 75.616084°W
- Area: less than one acre
- Built: 1896
- Architectural style: Late Victorian
- NRHP reference No.: 02000307
- Added to NRHP: April 1, 2002

Upperville Meeting House is a historic Friends meeting house on New York State Route 80 in Upperville, Chenango County, New York. It was built in 1896 and is a one-story rectangular wood-frame building on a dressed stone foundation. It is built into a hillside.

Herbert Dixon, a congregational layman, had held Sabbath School for around 40 years in the school house at Upperville, and by his untiring efforts succeeded in raising funds toward building a chapel in Upperville. At last he bought the property and deeded it to the Friends on the condition that they hold services there for ten years. Walter Whitney of the Methodist Church in Smyrna conducted services there from 1935 to 1937. Eventually the congregation became so small that services were no longer held. In 1965 the Society voted to sell the building and it was bought by Mrs. John A. Leavitt of Glastonbury, Connecticut, whose daughter, Mrs. Robert Anderson, was a resident of Smyrna.

The meeting house became unused and passed through several private hands. It was purchased by Terrance Lindall in the mid-1980s and became the Greenwood Museum. Lindall purchased the rectory next to it and the house opposite intending to create a cultural and recreational facility. Exhibits included objects from a Gothic chapel, quilts of Margit Echols, and French Empire furnishing. Events included wreath making and chess tournaments. He released the property to the Quakers in Hamilton, New York so it could once more be used for its intended purpose.

It was added to the National Register of Historic Places in 2002.

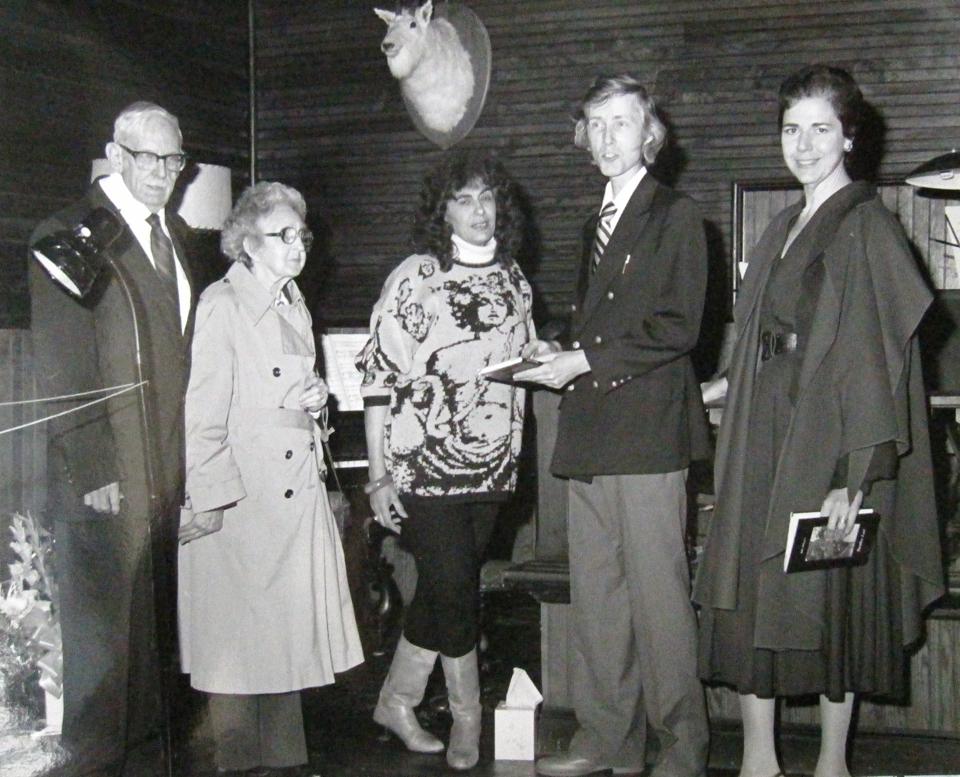
At left, former pastor (1928–30) at the Meeting House Augustus Benedict at a reception for him in 1988; Terrance Lindall, second from right.
