= Guilford, New York =

- Town
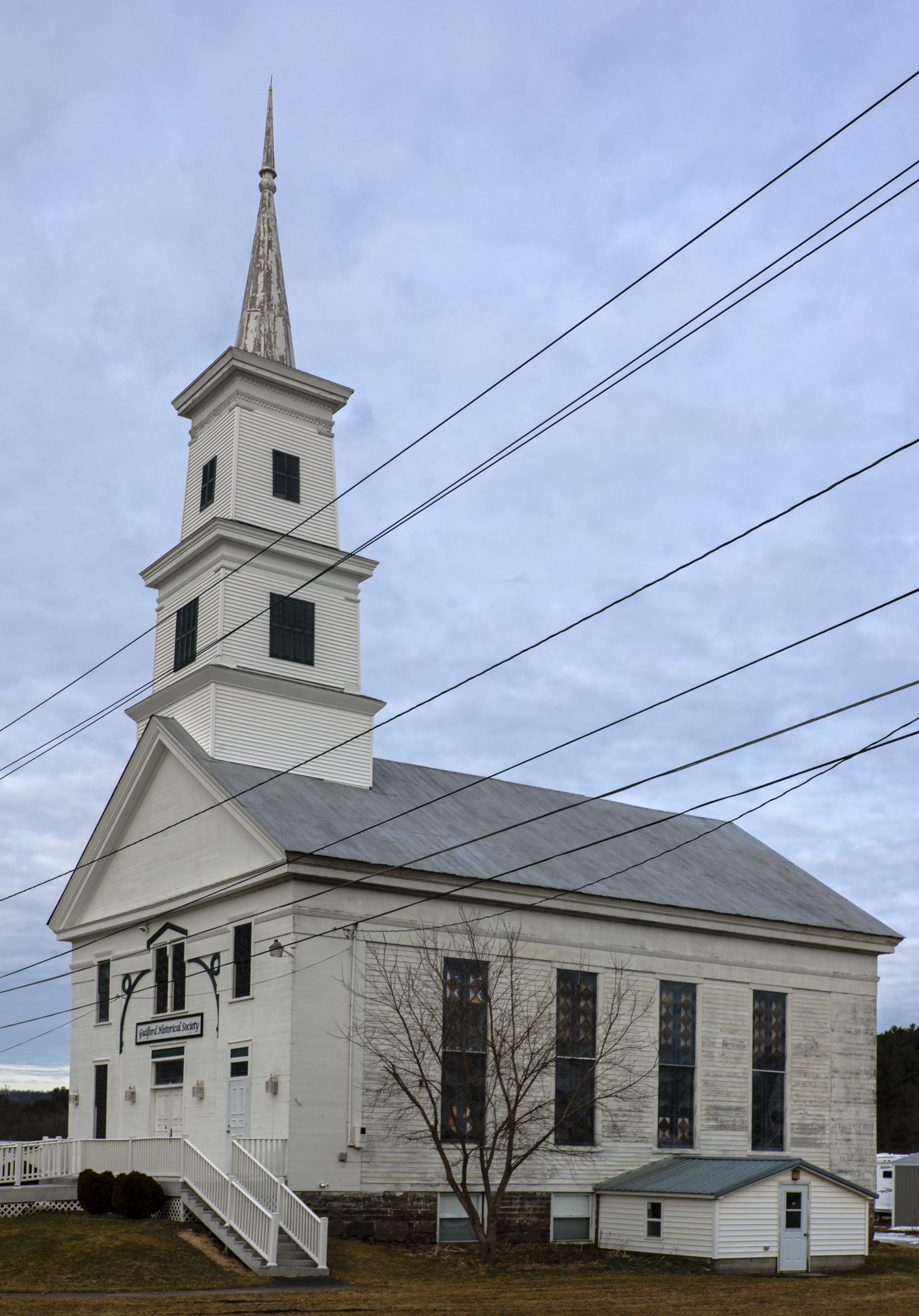
- Guilford Center Presbyterian Church
- Motto: "In the heart of NY"
- Location within Chenango County

- Location within the state of New York
- Coordinates: 42°24′11″N 75°27′8″W
- Country: United States
- State: New York
- County: Chenango

Government
  - Type: Town Council
  - Town Supervisor: George J. Seneck (R)
  - Town Council: Members' List: • Thomas Ives (R); • Joseph Zaczek (D); • Dolores L. Fuller (D); • vacancy

Area
  - Total: 61.96 sq mi (160.47 km^{2})
  - Land: 61.71 sq mi (159.84 km^{2})
  - Water: 0.24 sq mi (0.63 km^{2})
- Elevation: 1,362 ft (415 m)

Population (2010)
  - Total: 2,922
  - Estimate (2016): 2,839
  - Density: 46.0/sq mi (17.76/km^{2})
- Time zone: UTC-5 (Eastern (EST))
  - Summer (DST): UTC-4 (EDT)
- ZIP Codes: 13780 (Guilford); 13733 (Bainbridge); 13809 (Mount Upton); 13815 (Norwich); 13843 (South New Berlin)
- Area code: 607
- FIPS code: 36-017-31148
- GNIS feature ID: 0979031
- Website: www.guilfordny.gov

Guilford is a town in Chenango County, New York, United States. The town is on the eastern border of the county. The population was 2,922 at the 2010 census.

== History ==
The land was purchased from the Oneida people in 1785. The town was first settled circa 1787. One of the first settlements was in what is now known as East Guilford, by the Mercereau brothers (who were Revolutionary War spies for George Washington). They built a mill on Guilford Creek at Indian Orchard Falls, along the Catskill Turnpike.

Guilford was formed from the town of Oxford in 1813 as "Eastern". The name became "Guilford" in 1817. The town was called by an older name, "Fayette", for the early part of its history during the time it was in Tioga County.

== Geography ==
According to the United States Census Bureau, the town has a total area of 62.0 square miles (160.5 km^{2}), of which 61.7 square miles (159.8 km^{2}) is land and 0.23 square miles (0.6 km^{2}), or 0.39%, is water.

The eastern town line is the border of Otsego County. The border is marked by the Unadilla River, a southward-flowing tributary of the Susquehanna River.

New York State Route 8 is a north–south highway paralleling the Unadilla River.

== Demographics ==
Historical population
Census	Pop.	Note	%±
1820	2,175		—
1830	2,634		21.1%
1840	2,827		7.3%
1850	2,600		−8.0%
1860	2,743		5.5%
1870	2,806		2.3%
1880	2,441		−13.0%
1890	2,236		−8.4%
1900	2,208		−1.3%
1910	2,013		−8.8%
1920	1,818		−9.7%
1930	1,719		−5.4%
1940	1,884		9.6%
1950	2,283		21.2%
1960	2,368		3.7%
1970	2,358		−0.4%
1980	2,442		3.6%
1990	2,875		17.7%
2000	3,046		5.9%
2010	2,922		−4.1%
2016 (est.)	2,839	▼	−2.8%
U.S. Decennial Census

As of the census of 2000, there were 3,046 people, 1,181 households, and 838 families residing in the town. The population density was 49.4 inhabitants per square mile (19.1/km^{2}). There were 1,462 housing units at an average density of 23.7 per square mile (9.2/km^{2}). The racial makeup of the town was 97.64% White, 0.66% African American, 0.16% Native American, 0.23% Asian, 0.23% from other races, and 1.08% from two or more races. Hispanic or Latino of any race were 0.89% of the population.

There were 1,181 households, out of which 31.4% had children under the age of 18 living with them, 56.2% were married couples living together, 8.9% had a female householder with no husband present, and 29.0% were non-families. 22.7% of all households were made up of individuals, and 9.9% had someone living alone who was 65 years of age or older. The average household size was 2.58 and the average family size was 3.00.

In the town, the population was spread out, with 26.0% under the age of 18, 6.5% from 18 to 24, 27.3% from 25 to 44, 26.5% from 45 to 64, and 13.7% who were 65 years of age or older. The median age was 38 years. For every 100 females, there were 102.7 males. For every 100 females age 18 and over, there were 97.8 males.

The median income for a household in the town was $36,681, and the median income for a family was $40,801. Males had a median income of $31,528 versus $24,742 for females. The per capita income for the town was $15,536. About 10.7% of families and 12.0% of the population were below the poverty line, including 15.2% of those under age 18 and 8.6% of those age 65 or over.

== Notable people ==
- Solomon G. Haven, former US congressman
- Adelaide Daughaday, Christian missionary

== Communities and locations in Guilford ==
- East Guilford – A hamlet in the southeastern corner of the town on NY-8 by the junction of County Road 35.
- Godfrey Corners – A location near the eastern town line, west of Mount Upton.
- Guilford – A hamlet settled around 1797. The community is in the western part of the town at the junction of County Roads 35 and 38. The census-designated place of Guilford includes the hamlets of Guilford and Guilford Center. The Jewell Family Homestead on Furnace Hill Road was listed on the National Register of Historic Places in 2017.
- Guilford Center – A hamlet east of Guilford hamlet at the junction of County Roads 35 and 37. The Guilford Center Presbyterian Church was listed on the National Register in 2004. The Guilford Center Cemetery was listed in 2005.
- Guilford Lake – A lake located northwest of the hamlet of Guilford.
- High Bridge – A location near the eastern town line, northwest of Rockdale.
- Ives Settlement – A hamlet southeast of Guilford hamlet.
- Lathams Corners – A location at the eastern town line north of Rockwell Mills on NY-8.
- Mount Upton – A hamlet in the northeastern part of the town by the east town line on NY-8.
- New Berlin Junction – A location south of East Guilford.
- North Guilford Corners – A location near the northern town line.
- Parker – A hamlet south of Guilford Center on County Road 35.
- Rockdale – A hamlet in the southeastern part of the town at the east town line on NY-8.
- Rockwells Mills – A hamlet in the northeastern part of the town on NY-8. The Rockwells Mills Historic District was added to the National Register of Historic Places in 2010.
- Trestle Corners – A location near the eastern town line, west of Rockdale.
- Windsor Corners – A location north of Guilford hamlet, located at the junction of County Roads 36 and 37.
- Yaleville – A hamlet in the southwestern part of the town on County Road 38.
