= Rockwells Mills Historic District =

Historic district in New York, United States

- U.S. National Register of Historic Places
- U.S. Historic district
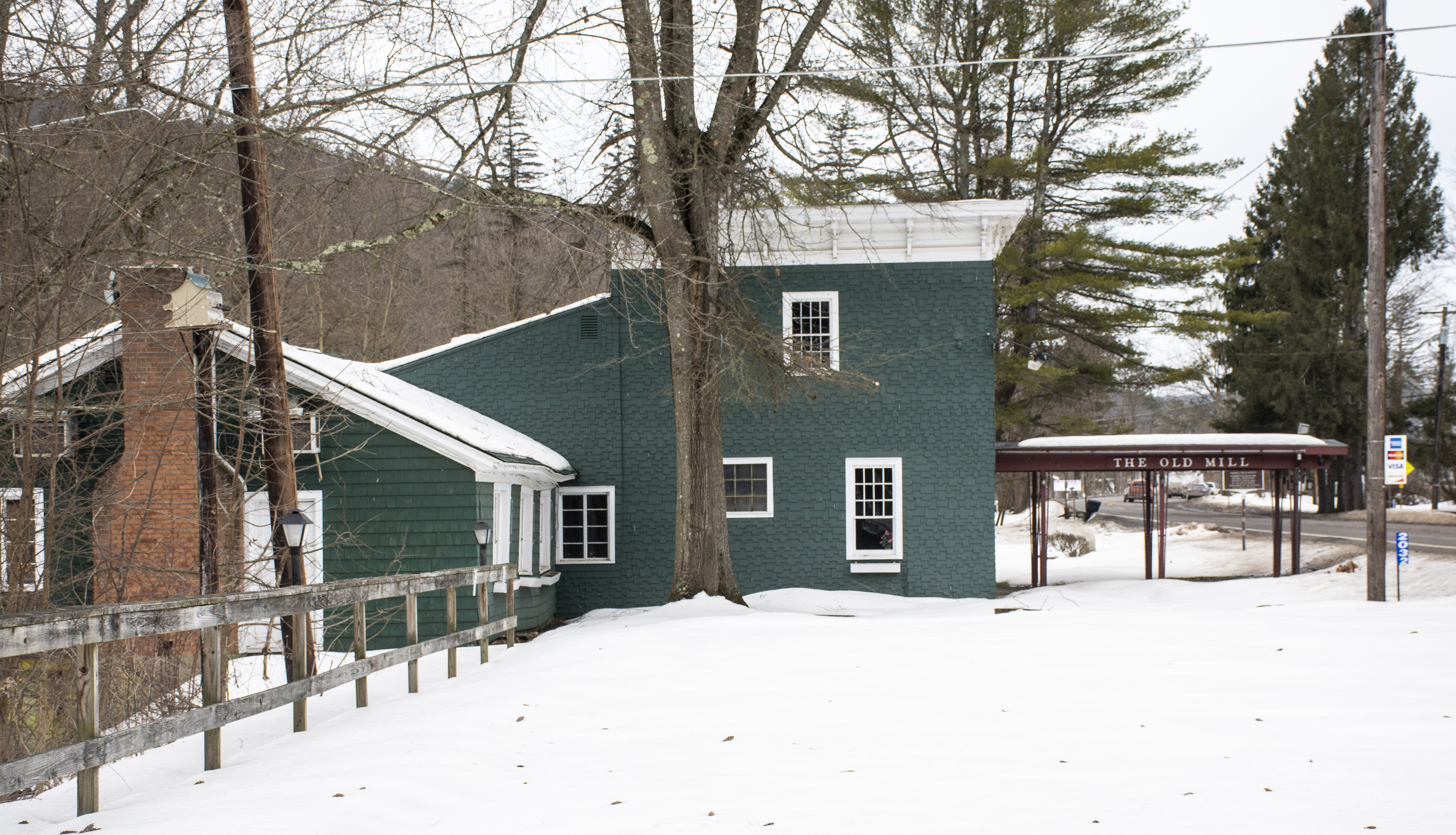

- Location within New York Location within the United States
- Location: NY 8 and Crandall Road, Guilford, New York
- Coordinates: 42°26′56″N 75°23′24″W
- Area: 21 acres (8.5 ha)
- Architect: Multiple
- NRHP reference No.: 10000610
- Added to NRHP: August 30, 2010

Rockwells Mills Historic District is a national historic district located at Guilford in Chenango County, New York. The district includes 26 contributing buildings including approximately 20 houses with associated houses and a stone textile mill. Included is the large Italianate style Chester Rockwell Residence (1867–1868), historically the mill owners house, and the stone mill building. The other residences are disbursed along New York State Route 8. In 1947, the mill was converted for use as a restaurant.

It was added to the National Register of Historic Places in 2010.
