= Earlville Opera House =

- U.S. National Register of Historic Places
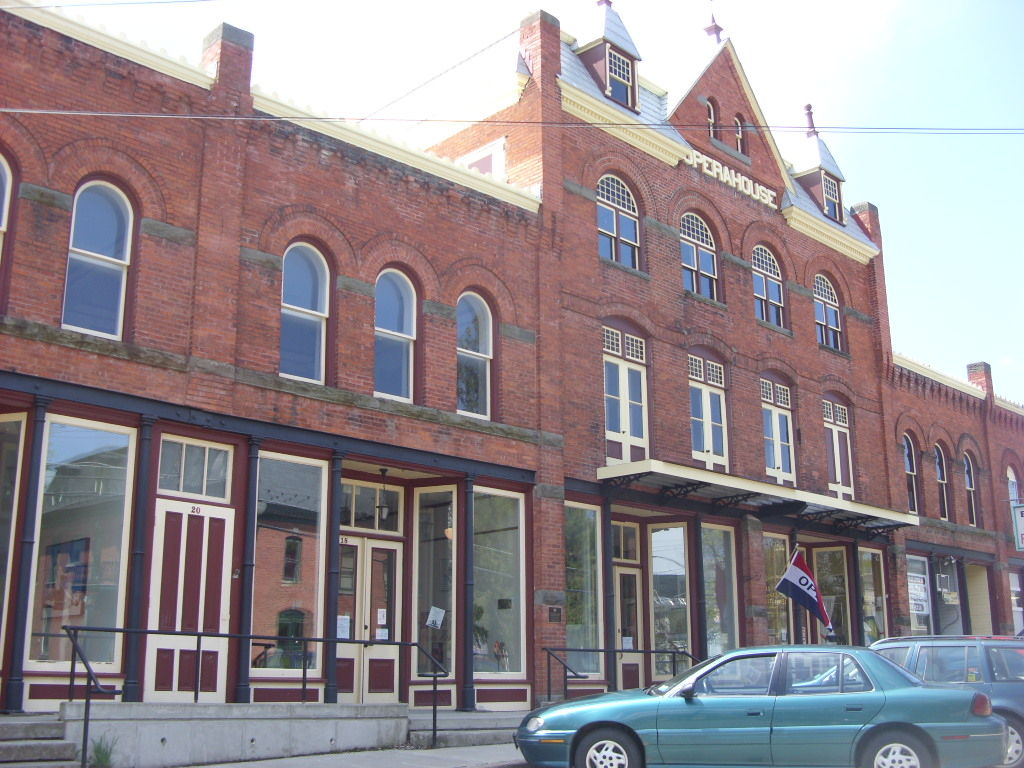
- Earlville Opera House, May 2009

- Location within New York Location within the United States
- Location: 12-20 E. Main St., Earlville, New York
- Coordinates: 42°44′22″N 75°32′41″W
- Area: less than one acre
- Built: 1890
- NRHP reference No.: 73001169
- Added to NRHP: January 22, 1973

Earlville Opera House is a historic theater located in Earlville in Chenango County, New York. It was built in 1890 and occupies six of the eight units of the Douglass Block. The three-story Opera House rises above the two-story annex with the theater and balcony occupying the second and third floor, while storefronts are housed on the first floor. The Opera House hosted Vaudeville acts, three-penny operas, and traveling medicine shows, silent movies, and “talkies.”

In 1971, Joey Skaggs purchased the theater and donated it to the Earlville community for the express purpose of restoring, preserving, and continuing its cultural function in perpetuity.

In July 1972, the Earlville Opera House, Inc., assembled a volunteer board of directors and began restorative work. In 1976, the Opera House saw its first live performance in more than fifty years. Since that time, the Opera House has operated as a volunteer-based, nonprofit organization.

Earlville Opera House is located within the Earlville Historic District. It is used as a community arts center. It was added to the National Register of Historic Places in 1973.

The Earlville Opera House is historic theater with three visual arts galleries, a gift shop featuring the work of regional artists, a workshop series in response to community needs, and a variety of cultural activities including administration of the New York State Council on the Arts State Community Regrants (SCR) Program for Broome, Chenango and Otsego counties.

The Opera House burned down soon after it was built in 1890. The village, with the help of Newell Douglass, constructed a second opera house in the Douglass block on East Main Street. It burned on March 31, 1892, when half of the Douglass block burned down. The current Opera House was completed by November 1892 on the same site.
