= Rockdale, New York =

- Hamlet
- Location within New York Location within the United States
- Coordinates: 42°22′41″N 75°24′28″W
- Country: United States
- State: New York
- County: Chenango
- Town: Guilford
- ZIP Code: 13809 (Mount Upton)

Rockdale is a hamlet in the town of Guilford, Chenango County, New York, United States. It is located on the Unadilla River, a southward-flowing tributary of the Susquehanna River.

It is the location of the Rockdale Community Church, added to the National Register of Historic Places in 2005.

In the novel Atlas Shrugged by Ayn Rand, several chapters take place at the fictional "Rockdale railway station" and at an estate five miles from the town.
