= Smyrna Town Hall-Opera House =

- U.S. National Register of Historic Places
- Location within New York Location within the United States
- Location: Academy St., Smyrna, New York
- Coordinates: 42°41′14″N 75°34′14″W
- Area: less than one acre
- Built: 1907
- NRHP reference No.: 08000699
- Added to NRHP: July 25, 2008

Smyrna Town Hall-Opera House is a historic town hall and theater at the hamlet of Smyrna in Chenango County, New York. It was built in 1907 and is a modest two story rectangular building under a shallow hipped roof topped by a square wooden cupola. It is of wood-frame construction with a yellow brick veneer, three bays wide and four bays deep.

It was added to the National Register of Historic Places in 2008.
