= Holden B. Mathewson House =

Historic house in New York, United States

- U.S. National Register of Historic Places
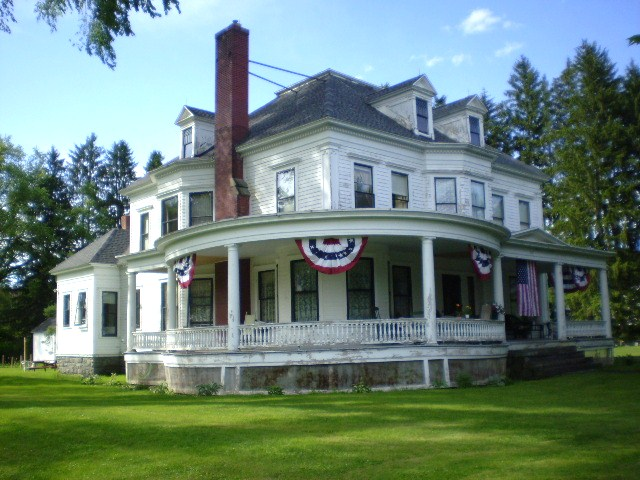
- Mathewson Home, July 2008

- Location within New York Location within the United States
- Location: 1567 NY 26, South Otselic, New York
- Coordinates: 42°13′41″N 75°31′36″W
- Area: 7.58 acres (3.07 ha)
- Built: 1908
- Architectural style: Colonial Revival
- NRHP reference No.: 09000860
- Added to NRHP: October 23, 2009

Holden B. Mathewson House is a historic home at South Otselic in Chenango County, New York. It is a large, Colonial Revival–style residence built in 1908–1909. It is a 2 1/2-story, frame structure on a rusticated stone foundation, surmounted by a tall hipped roof with gabled dormers.

It was added to the National Register of Historic Places in 2009.
