= Rockdale Community Church =

Historic church in New York, United States

- U.S. National Register of Historic Places
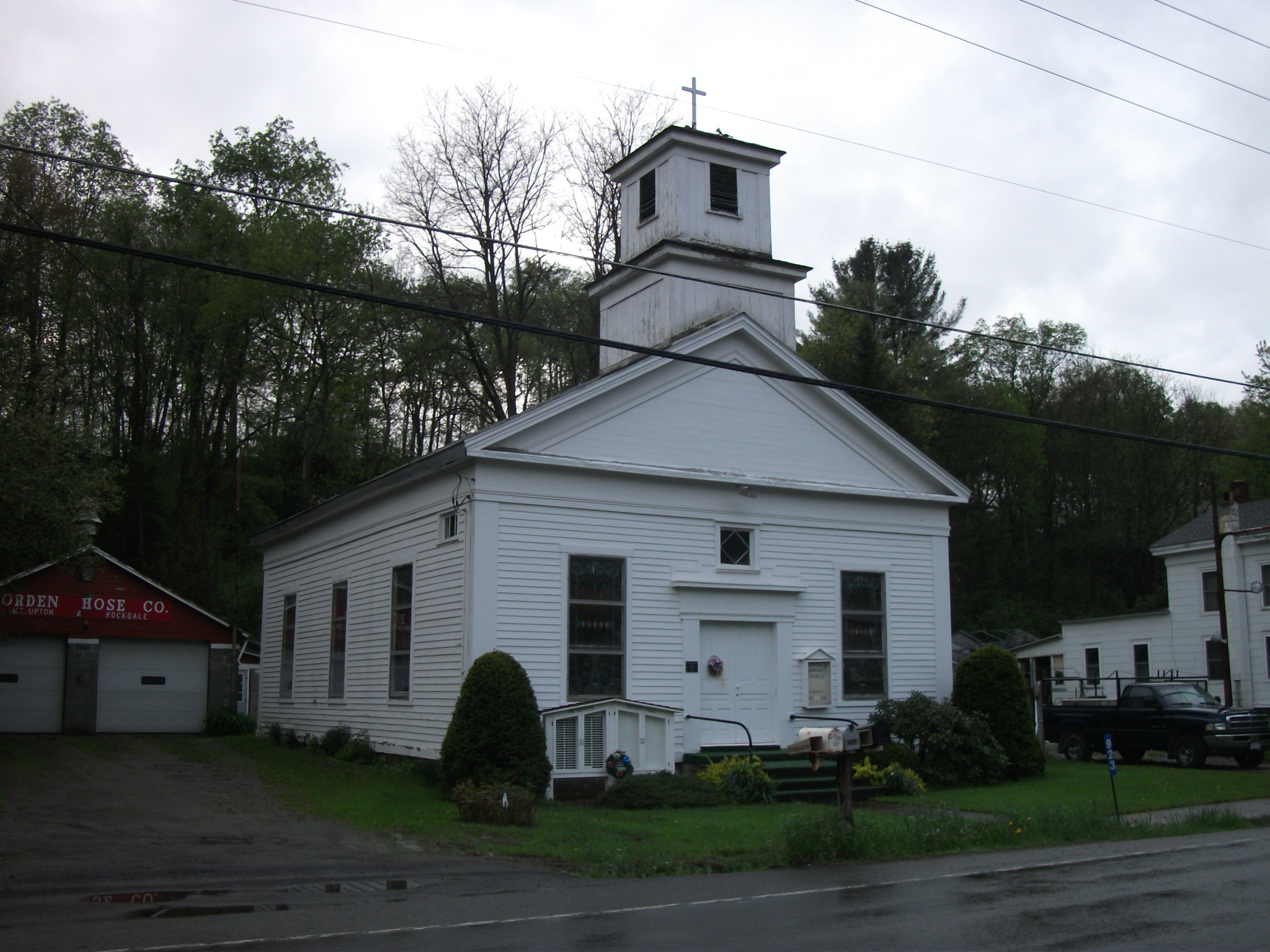
- Rockdale Community Church, May 11

- Location within New York Location within the United States
- Location: NY 8, Rockdale, New York
- Coordinates: 42°22′39″N 75°24′30″W
- Area: less than one acre
- Built: 1860
- Architect: Peet (no first name); Skinner, Stanley and Bro.
- Architectural style: Greek Revival
- NRHP reference No.: 05001128
- Added to NRHP: October 5, 2005

Rockdale Community Church is a historic church on New York State Route 8 in the hamlet of Rockdale, Chenango County, New York. It was built in 1860 and is a one-story rectangular wood-frame building, three bays long and three bays wide. It sits on a stone foundation and is surmounted by a gable roof. It features a two-stage tower topped by a small cross.

It was added to the National Register of Historic Places in 2005.
