= Sherburne Historic District =

Historic district in New York, United States

- U.S. National Register of Historic Places
- U.S. Historic district
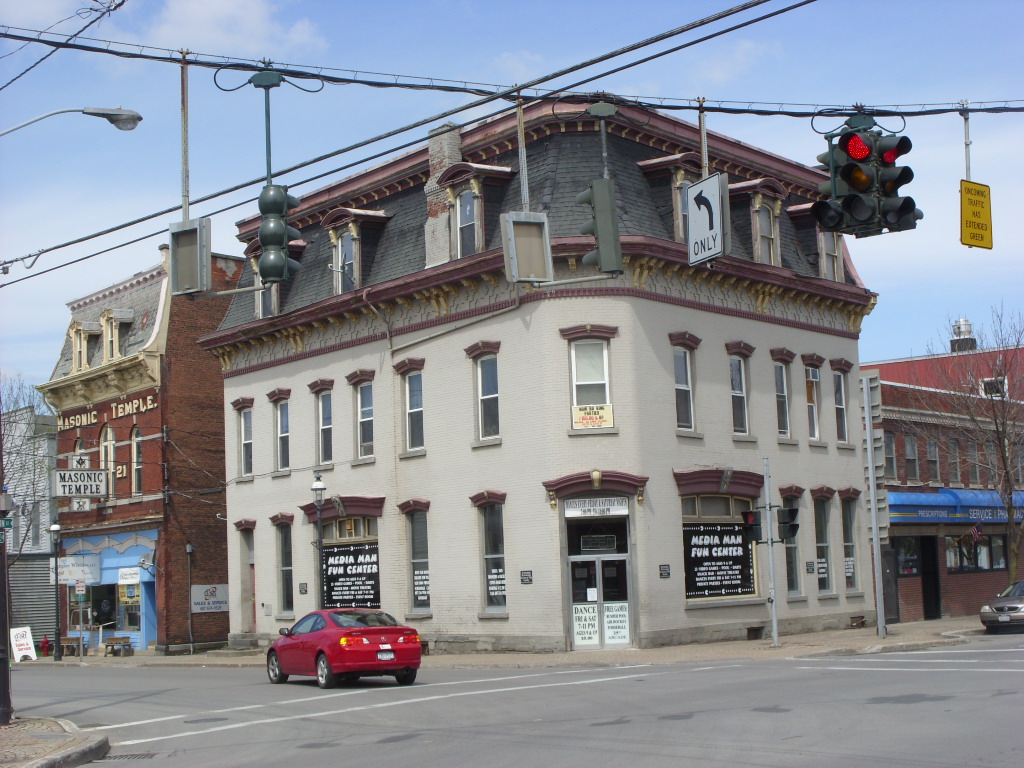
- Sherburne Bank Building and Sanford Block, Sanford Historic District, May 2009

- Location within New York Location within the United States
- Location: N. and S. Main, E. and W. State, Classic, Summit and Church Sts. and Park Ave., Sherburne, New York
- Coordinates: 42°40′37″N 75°29′38″W
- Area: 86 acres (35 ha)
- Architect: Multiple
- Architectural style: Greek Revival, Second Empire, Colonial Revival
- NRHP reference No.: 82001097
- Added to NRHP: October 29, 1982

Sherburne Historic District is a national historic district located at Sherburne in Chenango County, New York. The district includes 119 contributing buildings and one contributing structure. The district contains four areas: the commercial district, the South Main Street neighborhood, the William Champ Park and environs, and the East State Street residential area. The district includes commercial, academic, industrial, and residential properties. Among the notable structures are the Sherburne Bank Building (now Post Office, 1880), Sanford Block (now Masonic Temple, 1882), Sherburne Inn (1917), Congregational Church (1864–1868, 1884), and Sherburne Public Library (1910, 1938).

It was added to the National Register of Historic Places in 1982.
