= Guilford Center Presbyterian Church =

Historic church in New York, United States

- Guildford Center Presbyterian Church
- U.S. National Register of Historic Places
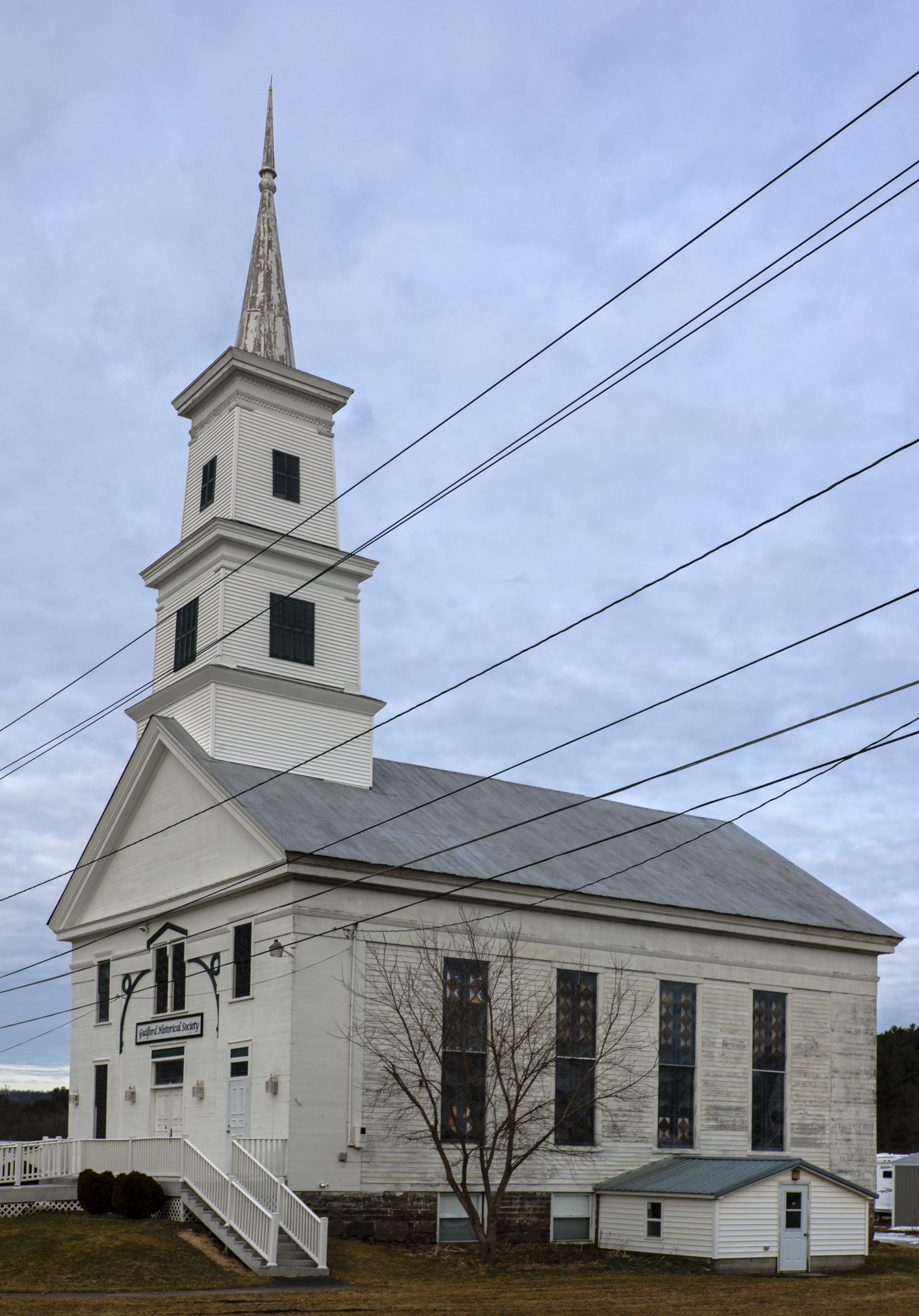
- East elevation and south profile, 2019

- Location within New York Location within the United States
- Location: Cty Rd. 36, Guilford Center, New York
- Coordinates: 42°24′23″N 75°27′53″W
- Area: less than one acre
- Built: 1817
- Architectural style: Greek Revival
- NRHP reference No.: 04001059
- Added to NRHP: September 24, 2004

Guilford Center Presbyterian Church is a historic Presbyterian church on County Road 36 in Guilford Center, Chenango County, New York. It was built in 1817 and is a large 1 1/2-story rectangular wood-frame building, five bays long and three bays wide. It has a cut-stone foundation. It features a three-stage tower with a spire.

It was added to the National Register of Historic Places in 2004.
