= Chenango County Courthouse District =

Historic district in New York, United States

- U.S. National Register of Historic Places
- U.S. Historic district
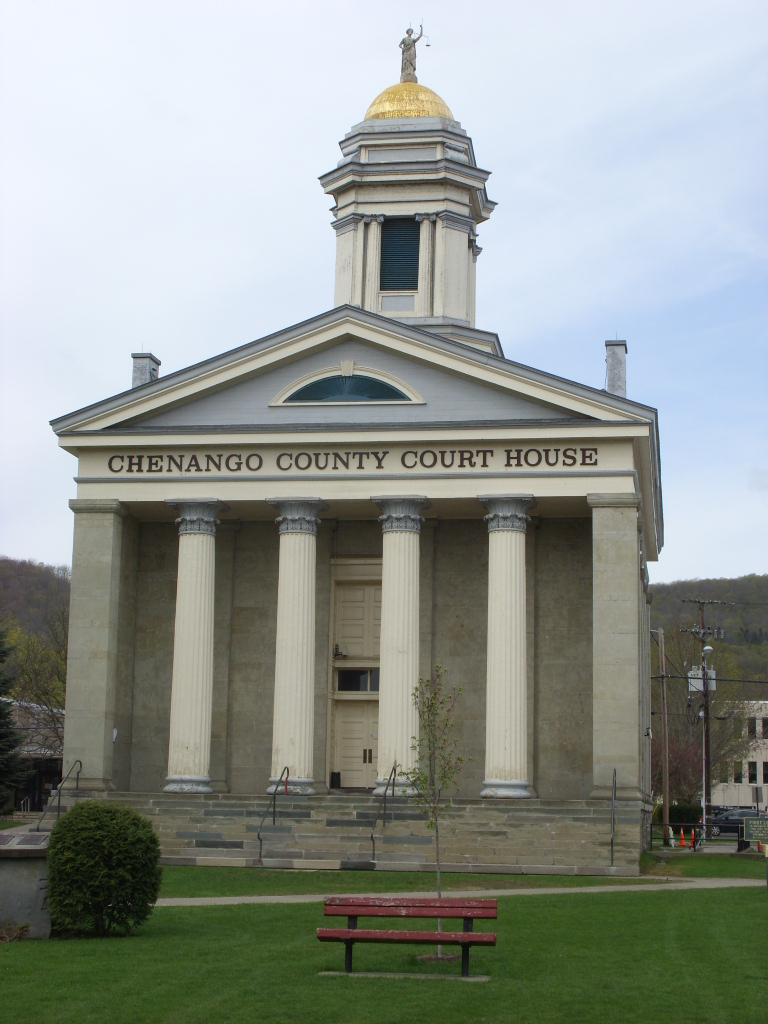
- Chenango County Courthouse, May 2009

- Location within New York Location within the United States
- Location: Irregular pattern between Hayes and Mechanic Sts. and Maple Ave. and City Hall, Norwich, New York
- Coordinates: 42°31′53″N 75°31′27″W
- Area: 19.8 acres (8.0 ha)
- Architectural style: Greek Revival, Gothic
- NRHP reference No.: 75001178
- Added to NRHP: June 10, 1975

Chenango County Courthouse District is a national historic district that includes a historic courthouse located at Norwich in Chenango County, New York. The district has 45 contributing buildings and includes two parks, governmental buildings, cultural and commercial buildings. Notable buildings include the Chenango County Courthouse (1837), Sheriff's office (1905), County Clerk's office (1852), First Baptist Church (1845), Maurice S. Ireland Building (1880), Old Norwich Hotel, City Hall (1903), and the Erie-Lackawanna Railroad Depot (1902). Also in the district is the separately listed US Post Office-Norwich.

It was added to the National Register of Historic Places in 1975.
