= Earlville, New York =

- Village
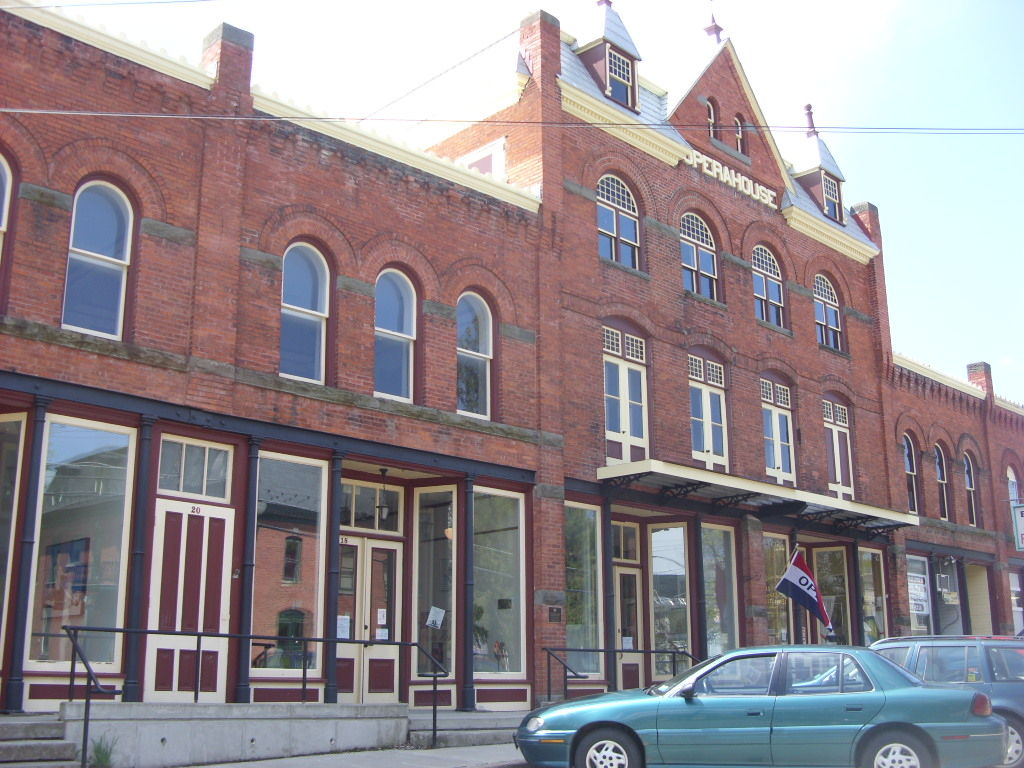
- Earlville Opera House

- Earlville in 1875

- Location within New York Location within the United States
- Coordinates: 42°44′28″N 75°32′38″W
- Country: United States
- State: New York
- Counties: Madison, Chenango
- Towns: Hamilton, Sherburne

Government
  - Mayor: Thomas Taylor

Area
  - Total: 1.08 sq mi (2.80 km^{2})
  - Land: 1.08 sq mi (2.80 km^{2})
  - Water: 0 sq mi (0.00 km^{2})
- Elevation: 1,099 ft (335 m)

Population (2020)
  - Total: 774
  - Density: 716.1/sq mi (276.49/km^{2})
- Time zone: UTC-5 (Eastern (EST))
  - Summer (DST): UTC-4 (EDT)
- ZIP Code: 13332
- Area code: 315
- FIPS code: 36-21523
- GNIS feature ID: 0948958
- Website: www.villageofearlville.com

Earlville is a village in New York state bisected by two counties: Madison County and Chenango County, United States. The population was 774 as per the 2020 decennial census, a decrease from the 872 reported in the 2010 census. The village is named after Jonas Earl, a canal commissioner.

The village's East and West Main Street runs along the Madison–Chenango county line. The Madison County part of Earlville is within the Syracuse Metropolitan Statistical Area.

== History ==
The area was first settled around 1792 and was originally called "Forks" or "Madison Forks" until the current name was adopted around 1835, after development of the Chenango Canal. It was named for the builder of the Chenango Canal. After canal transportation waned, railroad service helped community commerce.

Earlville became an incorporated village in 1887. The Earlville Historic District was added to the National Register of Historic Places in 1982. The Earlville Opera House was listed in 1973 and houses a theater, two art galleries, an arts cafe, and an artisan gift shop.

== Geography ==
Earlville is located at 42°44′28″N 75°32′38″W (42.741079, -75.543827) along the southern edge of Madison County and the northern edge of Chenango County. The village is bordered by the Chenango River to the west and the Sangerfield River, a tributary of the Chenango, to the east. The Chenango River is a southward-flowing tributary of the Susquehanna River.

According to the U.S. Census Bureau, the village has a total area of 1.1 square miles (2.8 km^{2}), all land.

New York State Route 12B, a north–south highway, passes through the center of the village as North and South Main Street. East and West Main Street crosses NY 12B, dividing the village between the two counties (Madison and Chenango). NY 12B leads north 6 miles (10 km) to the village of Hamilton and south 5 miles (8 km) to Sherburne.

== Demographics ==
Historical population
| Census | Pop. | Note | %± |
|---|---|---|---|
| 1870 | 399 | | — |
| 1880 | 293 | | −26.6% |
| 1890 | 536 | | 82.9% |
| 1900 | 711 | | 32.6% |
| 1910 | 874 | | 22.9% |
| 1920 | 792 | | −9.4% |
| 1930 | 868 | | 9.6% |
| 1940 | 864 | | −0.5% |
| 1950 | 945 | | 9.4% |
| 1960 | 1,004 | | 6.2% |
| 1970 | 1,050 | | 4.6% |
| 1980 | 985 | | −6.2% |
| 1990 | 883 | | −10.4% |
| 2000 | 791 | | −10.4% |
| 2010 | 872 | | 10.2% |
| 2020 | 774 | | −11.2% |
U.S. Decennial Census

As of the census of 2000, there were 791 people, 298 households, and 219 families residing in the village. The population density was 729.4 inhabitants per square mile (281.6/km^{2}). There were 329 housing units at an average density of 303.4 per square mile (117.1/km^{2}). The racial makeup of the village was 98.99% White, 0.25% Asian, and 0.76% from two or more races. Hispanic or Latino of any race were 0.76% of the population.

There were 298 households, out of which 36.2% had children under the age of 18 living with them, 55.4% were married couples living together, 13.8% had a female householder with no husband present, and 26.2% were non-families. 20.5% of all households were made up of individuals, and 8.4% had someone living alone who was 65 years of age or older. The average household size was 2.65 and the average family size was 3.03.

In the village, the population was spread out, with 27.2% under the age of 18, 7.3% from 18 to 24, 27.7% from 25 to 44, 24.4% from 45 to 64, and 13.4% who were 65 years of age or older. The median age was 38 years. For every 100 females, there were 87.9 males. For every 100 females age 18 and over, there were 87.0 males.

The median income for a household in the village was $32,500, and the median income for a family was $33,654. Males had a median income of $27,381 versus $24,038 for females. The per capita income for the village was $15,383. About 9.0% of families and 11.8% of the population were below the poverty line, including 15.6% of those under age 18 and 10.7% of those age 65 or over.

== Earlville homes ==
Earlville is known for its lovely historical Victorian homes and Second Empire mansard roofs. Homes often have traditionally vibrant colors popular for "painted ladies" of the era.
