= List of county routes in Chenango County, New York =

County routes in Chenango County, New York, are signed with the Manual on Uniform Traffic Control Devices-standard yellow-on-blue pentagon route marker.

== Routes 1–25 ==
Route	Length (mi)	Length (km)	From	Via	To	Notes
CR 1	1.79	2.88	Broome County line (becomes CR 140)	Cloverdale Road in Greene	NY 12	
CR 2	15.97	25.70	NY 12 in Greene	Genegantslet and Ridge roads	Cortland County line in German (becomes CR 164)	
CR 3	10.25	16.50	NY 41 in Smithville	East Smithville, Bottle Hill, and Tyner roads	NY 12 in Oxford	
CR 3A	4.27	6.87	NY 12 in Greene	Harbor Road	CR 3 in Smithville	
CR 4	6.04	9.72	NY 12 in Oxford	Georgetown Road	CR 10 / CR 10A / CR 19 in Preston	
CR 5	5.34	8.59	Cortland County line in German (becomes CR 168)	Unnamed road	NY 220 / CR 7 in McDonough	
CR 6	0.46	0.74	Cortland County line (becomes CR 165)	Forty Road in German	CR 2	
CR 7	5.64	9.08	NY 220 / CR 5 in McDonough	Moon Hill Road	CR 10 in Pharsalia	
CR 7A	0.08	0.13	CR 7	Moon Hill Road in Pharsalia	CR 10	
CR 8	4.82	7.76	NY 220 in McDonough	East Pharsalia Road	CR 10 in Pharsalia	
CR 9	8.28	13.33	NY 79 in Greene	Page Brook Road	NY 41 / NY 206 in Coventry	
CR 10	9.16	14.74	NY 23 in Pharsalia	Unnamed road	CR 4 / CR 10A / CR 19 in Preston	
CR 10A	5.10	8.21	CR 4 / CR 10 / CR 19 in Preston	Old Route 319	Norwich city line in Norwich	Formerly part of NY 319
CR 11	1.02	1.64	Cortland County line (becomes CR 166B)	Cincinnatus Road in Pitcher	NY 26	
CR 12	10.75	17.30	NY 26 in Pitcher	Unnamed road	Madison County line in Lincklaen (becomes CR 53)	
CR 12A	0.42	0.68	Cortland County line (becomes CR 158)	Union Valley Road in Pitcher	CR 12	Includes both legs of wye connection with CR 12
CR 12B	0.30	0.48	CR 12	Lincklean Pond Road in Lincklaen	Lincklaen Center Road	
CR 12C	0.18	0.29	Cortland County line (becomes CR 152A)	Lincklaen Street in Lincklaen	CR 12	
CR 13	6.24	10.04	NY 26 in Otselic	Mariposa Road	Madison County line in Lincklaen (becomes CR 61)	
CR 13A	0.37	0.60	CR 13	Ridge Road in Otselic	Valley View Road	
CR 14	3.68	5.92	NY 80	West Main Street in Smyrna	Earlville village line	
CR 15	1.01	1.63	NY 8	West Street in New Berlin	NY 23	
CR 15A	0.11	0.18	CR 15	West Street in New Berlin	NY 23	
CR 16	14.88	23.95	NY 23 in Plymouth	Unnamed road	Madison County line in Otselic (becomes CR 58)	Discontinuous at NY 26
CR 17	8.46	13.62	NY 41 in Afton	Brackett Lake Road	CR 27 in Oxford	
CR 18	7.02	11.30	Oxford village line in Oxford	McCall, Jones, and Bogers roads	CR 10 in Preston	
CR 19	5.46	8.79	CR 4 / CR 10 / CR 10A in Preston	Blackman and Hoag Childes roads	CR 10A in Norwich	
CR 20	3.92	6.31	CR 23 in Sherburne	Charles Merrill Road	Smyrna village in Smyrna	
CR 21	4.33	6.97	CR 16 in Plymouth	Unnamed road	CR 20 in Smyrna	
CR 22	3.71	5.97	CR 14	Unnamed road in Smyrna	Madison County line (becomes CR 64)	Includes both legs of wye connection with CR 14
CR 23	5.12	8.24	NY 12 in North Norwich	North Main Street	NY 80 in Sherburne	
CR 23A	0.84	1.35	Peck Road	Pleasant and East Cayuga streets in North Norwich	NY 12	
CR 23B	0.27	0.43	Old railroad grade	West Cayuga Street in North Norwich	CR 23 / CR 23C	
CR 23C	0.13	0.21	CR 23 / CR 23B	West Cayuga Street in North Norwich	CR 23A	
CR 23D	0.04	0.06	CR 23A	Pleasant Street in North Norwich	NY 12	
CR 24	10.34	16.64	NY 12 in Sherburne	Shawler Brook Road	CR 25 in Columbus	
CR 25	2.79	4.49	NY 80	Unnamed road in Columbus	Otsego County line (becomes CR 20)	Discontinuous at NY 8

== Routes 26 and up ==
Route	Length (mi)	Length (km)	From	Via	To	Notes
CR 26	2.83	4.55	Broome County line (becomes CR 233)	Windsor Road in Afton	NY 41	
CR 27	7.89	12.70	NY 41 / NY 206 in Coventry	Cheshire and Coventry roads	CR 35 in Oxford	
CR 28	6.20	9.98	NY 23	Unnamed road in New Berlin	CR 29	
CR 28A	0.06	0.10	CR 28	Unnamed spur in New Berlin	Dead end	
CR 29	8.47	13.63	NY 320 at Tiffany Road in North Norwich	King Settlement Road	New Berlin village line in New Berlin	
CR 30	6.42	10.33	NY 235 in Coventry	Smith and Long Hill roads	Afton village line in Afton	
CR 31	2.78	4.47	NY 23 in Norwich	Chenango Lake Road	Humphrey Road in New Berlin	
CR 32	31.41	50.55	Broome County line in Greene (becomes CR 205)	East River Road	NY 12 in North Norwich	Split into five segments by four state and village-maintained sections (Note: CR 32 is discontinuous at the villages of Greene and Oxford, within which the road is village-maintained. The route is further split by the easternmost part of NY 220 east of Oxford and the east half of NY 990L east of the city of Norwich.)
CR 32A	0.38	0.61	Norwich city line	Hale Street in Norwich	CR 32	
CR 32B	0.17	0.27	NY 12	Bridge over Chenango River in Norwich	CR 32	
CR 32C	0.27	0.43	NY 12	Bridge Street in Greene	CR 32	
CR 33	7.39	11.89	CR 32 in Norwich	Polkville Hill Road	NY 8 in Guilford	
CR 34	6.94	11.17	CR 33 in Norwich	Springvale Road	NY 8 in Norwich	
CR 35	14.18	22.82	NY 220 / CR 32 in Oxford	Unnamed road	Otsego County line in Guilford (becomes CR 1)	
CR 36	7.67	12.34	CR 35 in Guilford	Unnamed road	CR 33 in Norwich	
CR 37	4.98	8.01	CR 36	Unnamed road in Guilford	NY 8 / NY 51	
CR 38	7.79	12.54	NY 7 in Bainbridge	Secor Street	CR 35 in Guilford	
CR 39	9.26	14.90	Afton village line in Afton	Unnamed road	Delaware County line in Bainbridge	
CR 40	0.07	0.11	NY 8	Lockwood Hill Road in Guilford	Otsego County line (becomes CR 1)	
CR 41	2.30	3.70	NY 8	Unnamed road in Columbus	Madison County line	
CR 42	4.41	7.10	NY 26	Old Route 23 in Pharsalia	NY 23	Former routing of NY 23
CR 43	0.04	0.06	NY 23	Unnamed spur in New Berlin	Dead end at CR 28	
CR 44	2.84	4.57	NY 12 in North Norwich	Country Club Road	NY 23 in Plymouth	Designated NY 434 from c. 1940 to early 1940s
CR 45	0.20	0.32	NY 12	Norwich Lt. Warren Eaton Airport access road in North Norwich	Mead Pond Road	
CR 46	1.02	1.64	NY 12	Lower Ravine Road in Norwich	Upper Ravine Road	
CR 47	3.27	5.26	CR 10 in Preston	Fred Stewart, Childs–Hoag, Bosworth, and Porter roads	CR 10 in Pharsalia	
CR 999	0.03	0.05	Chenango River west bank	State Street in Oxford village	Chenango River east bank	Route is unsigned; former routing of NY 220

== See also ==
- County routes in New York
- List of former state routes in New York (401–500)
