= List of New York State Historic Markers in Chenango County, New York =

Afton, New York "This is an incomplete list of New York State Historic Markers in Chenango County, New York. Afton, New York

== Listings county-wide ==
City or Town	Marker name	Image	Date designated	Location	City or Town	Coords	Marker text
Afton, Town of, New York	HISTORIC NEW YORK	Historic marker of Historic New York, Unadilla Region, Afton, NY.	Education Department State of New York 1965 Department of Public Works	NYS Route 7 between Bainbridge and Afton, NY at traffic pull off	Afton, Town of, New York	N 42˚14’32.2” W 75˚29’37.8”	HISTORIC NEW YORK UNADILLA REGION Indians living in the valleys of the Unadilla and Susquehanna Rivers played an important role in the region’s early history.
Afton, Town of, New York	MORMON HOUSE	Historic marker of Mormon House, Afton, NY	State Education Department 1932	20 feet east of NYS Route 41 in front of Afton Fair Grounds, Afton, NY	Afton, Town of, New York	N 42˚13'17.9" W 75˚31'18.3"	MORMON HOUSE Joseph Smith, founder of the Mormon Church was married in this house to Emily Hale (New Sign has been put up with the change from Emily to Emma. New photo needed)
Bainbridge, Town of, New York	FIRST TOLL GATE	Historic marker of the first toll gate on the Susquehanna-Bath Turnpike was near this point in Bainbridge, NY.	State Education Department	West Main Street, NYS Route 206. 3 miles northwest of Bainbridge, NY	Bainbridge, Town of, New York	N 42˚18'30.1" W 75˚31'18.0"	FIRST TOLL GATE On the Susquehanna-Bath Turnpike was near this point
Columbus, Town of, New York	ARROW (CARR FARM)	Historic marker of the Carr farm, Brant's Indians and Tories meeting place, 1770-1778 in Columbus, NY.	Erected 2002	NYS Route 8 about six miles north of New Berlin, NY. In the town of Columbus, NY	Columbus, Town of, New York	N 42˚39'43.0” W 75˚19'55.8”	1/4 MILE To Historic Carr Farm Meeting Place Of Brant's Indians And Tories 1770–1778
Lincklaen, Town Of, New York	JOHN B. FINCH	Historic marker of John B. Finch, Lincklaen, NY, Right Worthy Grand Templar of the World Wide Order of Good Templars.	State Education Department 1938	Chenango Co. Route 12.1½ miles north of Lincklaen, NY	Lincklaen, Town Of, New York	N 42˚41'44.7" W 75˚52'24.1”	JOHN B. FINCH Great Temperance Orator, Born Here March 17, 1852 Right Worthy Grand Templar Of The World-wide Order Of Good Templars, 1884-1887
McDonough, Town Of, New York	DEACON TOWNE	Historic marker of Deacon Towne, he held the first religious services in McDonough, NY. Buried on former Michael and Daniel Pike Farm.	State Education Department 1938	NYS Route 220 at village of McDonough, NY, north on Pike Road then right on Beckwith Road	McDonough, Town Of, New York	N 42˚31'16.7” W 75˚44'44.6”	DEACON TOWNE Came With Pioneers From New England And Held First Religious Services Here In Log Cabins Buried On Former Michael And Daniel Pike Farm, South Of Fence.
Columbus, Town of, New York	UNADILLA RIVER	Historic marker of the Unadilla River, lands to the west ceded to New York State by the Iroquois via treaty of September 22, 1788.	Erected 2002	NYS Route 8, north of New Berlin, NY in the town of Columbus, NY on east side of road in row of trees overlooking the river	Columbus, Town of, New York	N 42˚39’43.0” W 75˚19’55.8”	UNADILLA RIVER Lands west of river ceded to NY State by Iroquois in a Treaty made by Gov.George Clinton at Fort Schuyler, September 22, 1778
Greene, Town Of, New York	CHENANGO CANAL #16	Historic marker of Chenango Canal #16 Historic building was inn of canal travelers 1846-56. Canal boat repair station was east of road.	Chenango Co. Bicentennial ‘82	NYS Route 12 at Brisben, NY	Greene, Town Of, New York	N 42°21’54.7” W 75°40’50.9”	CHENANGO CANAL 1837-1878 Historic building was inn of canal travelers 1846-56. Canal boat repair station was east of road.
Greene, Town Of, New York	CHENANGO CANAL #17	Historic marker of Chenango Canal tow path and bed.	Chenango Co. Bicentennial ‘82	NYS Route 12, 2.1 miles south of Oxford, NY	Greene, Town Of, New York	N 42˚21’08.7” W 75˚43’30.2”	CHENANGO CANAL 1837-1878 The canal bed and towpath curve around to make level route on the valley floor.
Greene, Town Of, New York	CHENANGO CANAL #19	Historic marker, Chenango Canal #19. Ruins of Aqueduct over the Chenango River, Greene, NY	Chenango Co. Bicentennial ‘82	NYS Route 12, just south of Greene, NY	Greene, Town Of, New York	N 42˚19’24.6” W 75˚46’34.5”	CHENANGO CANAL 1837-1878 Near here to the east are ruins of an aqueduct which carried the canal across the Chenango River
Greene, Town Of, New York	CHENANGO CANAL #20	Historic maker, Chenango Canal # 20. 1845 culvert, Greene, NY.	Chenango Co. Bicentennial ‘82	NYS Rt. 12, south of the Village of Greene, NY	Greene, Town Of, New York	N 42˚18’31.1 W 75˚46’42.7”	CHENANGO CANAL 1837-1878 On this spot was a 100 ft. culvert of cut stone dated 1845 which carried a creek under the canal.
North Norwich, Town of, New York	CHENANGO CANAL #5	Historic marker of Chenango Canal #5: Aqueduct at North Norwich, NY	Chenango Co. Bicentennial ‘82	NYS Route. 12, just south of the village of North Norwich, NY	North Norwich, Town of, New York	N 42°36’35.0” W 75°31’39.3”	CHENANGO CANAL 1837-1878 This stone arch supported an aqueduct that carried the canal over Fly Creek.
North Norwich, Town of, New York	CHENANGO CANAL #6	Historic marker of Chenango Canal #6: Meads Pond holding basin at North Norwich, NY	Chenango Co. Bicentennial ‘82	NYS Route 12, south of the village of North Norwich, NY at Meads Pond	North Norwich, Town of, New York	N 42°34'18.9" W 75°31'41.4"	CHENANGO CANAL 1837-1878 Meads Pond was used as a holding basin for barges of iron, coal and freight from the adjacent canal.
North Norwich, Town of, New York	CHENANGO CANAL #7	Historic marker of Chenango Canal #7: canal and towpath at North Norwich, NY	Chenango Co. Bicentennial ‘82	NYS Route 12 south of the village of North Norwich, NY by the Warren Eaton Airport runway	North Norwich, Town of, New York	N 42°33'58.4" W 75°31'45.9"	CHENANGO CANAL 1837-1878 The canal and towpath can be seen parallel to the highway at this point.
Norwich, City of, New York	CHENANGO CANAL #10		Chenango Co. Bicentennial ‘82	On NYS Route 12, South Broad Street, Norwich, NY	Norwich, City of, New York	N 42°31’1.7” W 75°31’22.6”	CHENANGO CANAL 1837-1878 Just west a large wooden aqueduct spanned the creek.$2,500,000 canal linked area to Utica, Binghamton.
Norwich, City of, New York	CHENANGO CANAL #11		Chenango Co. Bicentennial ‘82	NYS Route 12	Norwich, Town of, New York		CHENANGO CANAL 1837-1878 Here canal is visible south of old Lock House where packets stopped for passengers.
Norwich, City of, New York	CHENANGO CANAL #12		Chenango Co. Bicentennial ‘82	NYS Route 12	Norwich, Town of, New York		CHENANGO CANAL 1837-1878 East of road are remains of a lock and feeder pond where canal passed through productive farm country.
Norwich, City of, New York	CHENANGO CANAL #9	Historic marker of Chenango Canal #9. Bridge, site of where 1,000 men of the 114th NY Regt. left for the Civil War by flotilla, Sept 6, 1862, Norwich, NY.	Chenango Co. Bicentennial ‘82	NYS Route 12	Norwich, City of, New York	N 42°31'42.4 W 75°31'25.4"	CHENANGO CANAL 1837-1878 Canal bridge site where 1000 men of 114th Regt. embarked by flotilla to Civil War,
Oxford, Town of, New York	CHENANGO CANAL #15	Historic marker of Chenango Canal #15, Bowman Creek, north of Lock 99, Oxford, NY.	Chenango Co. Bicentennial ‘82	NYS Route 12	Oxford, Town of, New York	N 42°24’13.6” W 75°38’07.9”	CHENANGO CANAL 1837-1878 Remains of the Aqueduct which carried the Canal across Bowman Creek, north of Lock 99
Oxford, Town of, New York	CHENANGO CANAL #13	Historic marker of Chenango Canal #13: original stone arch carrying canal over creek at Oxford, NY	Chenango Co. Bicentennial ‘82	NYS Route 12	Oxford, Town of, New York	N 42°22’38.0” W 75°39’15.7”	CHENANGO CANAL 1837-1878 Original stone arch carrying canal over creek about 150 yds. due east.
Oxford, Town of, New York	CHENANGO CANAL #14	Historic marker of the Chenango Canal #14, turning basin, Oxford, NY.	Chenango Co. Bicentennial ‘82	NYS Route.12	Oxford, Town of, New York	N 42°26’38.0” W 75°35’45.8”	CHENANGO CANAL 1837-1878 1837-1878 The Oxford turning basin site of overnight tie up for canal boats.
Oxford, Town of, New York	CHENANGO CANAL #15	Historic marker Chenango Canal #15 2 canal bed and towpath, Oxford, NY	Chenango Co. Bicentennial ‘82	NYS Route 12, Oxford, NY, to Chenango County Rd 3	Oxford, Town of, New York	N 42°25’26.9” W 75°38’00.2”	CHENANGO CANAL 1837-1878 Canal bed and towpath wound its way through the valley following the foot of the hills.
Sherburne, Town of, New York	CHENANGO CANAL #2	Historic marker of the Chenango Canal #2, Sherburne, NY	Chenango Co. Bicentennial ‘82	NYS Route 12, north of Sherburne, NY	Sherburne, Town of, New York	N 42°41’52.5” W 75°30’49.1”	CHENANGO CANAL 1837-1878 Just west can be seen the canal bed, towpath and site of woolen mill and other canal related industries
Sherburne, Town of, New York	CHENANGO CANAL #3	Historic marker of Chenango Canal # 3, canal under wooden bridge, Water Street, Sherburne, NY.	Chenango Co. Bicentennial ‘82	NYS Route 80, West State Street, Sherburne, NY	Sherburne, Town of, New York	N 42°40’41.9” W 75°30’00.4”	CHENANGO CANAL 1837-1878 At this point the canal ran under a wooden bridge on what was then known as Water St.
Sherburne, Town of, New York	CHENANGO CANAL #4	Historic marker of Chenango Canal #4, barn for mules, Sherburne, NY.	Chenango Co. Bicentennial ‘82	NYS Route 12, South Main Street, Sherburne, NY	Sherburne, Town of, New York	N 42°40’30.2” W 75°29’51.5”	CHENANGO CANAL 1837-1878 In barn at the rear of this house, mules were kept to tow boats on the adjoining canal.
Greene, Town of, New York	FIRST CHURCH IN VILLAGE OF GREENE	Historic marker of the Congregational Church of Greene, NY.	Chenango County Bicentennial '76	North Chenango Street, Greene, NY, in front of First Congregational Church	Greene, Town of, New York	N 42˚19’55.0” W 75˚46’04.1”	FIRST CHURCH IN VILLAGE OF GREENE This Congregational Church was organized in 1811. The first pastor was Rev. John B. Hoyt.
Greene, Town of, New York	FIRST BAPTIST CHURCH	Historic marker of first Baptist Church in Greene, NY	State Education Department 1936	South Chenango Street, Greene, NY	Greene, Town of, New York	N 42˚19’39.3” W 75˚46’18.8”	FIRST BAPTIST CHURCH In Chenango County organized on this site by Elder Nathaniel Kellogg in 1795
Greene, Town of, New York	FIRST BRIDGE	Historic marker of the first bridge over the Chenango River built 1807in Greene, NY. The Susquehanna and Bath Turnpike crossed here.	State Education Department 1936	Washington Street, Greene, NY, east side of the Chenango River	Greene, Town of, New York	N 42˚19’41.1” W 75˚46’03.6”	FIRST BRIDGE Across the Chenango river was built on this site in 1807. Susquehanna and Bath Turnpike crossed here
Greene, Town of, New York	FIRST REFRIGERATOR PLANT	Historic marker of first Refrigeration Plant in the United States, 1875-1900, Greene, NY	Greene Bicentennial Committee	North Genegantslet Road, north of intersection of Clark Road, Greene, NY	Greene, Town of, New York	N 42˚21’18.9” W 75˚48’37.0”	FIRST REFRIGERATOR PLANT East of this spot believed to be the First Refrigeration Plant in United States 1875-1900
Greene, Town of, New York	GO-WON-GO MOHAWK	Historic marker of Go-Won-Go Mohawk, home. Indian Princess from Greene, NY	State Education Department 1936	South Chenango and Page Street, Greene, NY	Greene, Town of, New York	N 42˚19’45.0” W 75˚46’12.0”	GO-WON-GO MOHAWK An Indian princess lived in this house.
Greene, Town of, New York	EARLY SETTLERS	Historic maker of the early settlers of Greene, NY.		North Chenango Street by Birdsall Brook, Greene, NY	Greene, Town of, New York	N 42˚19’59.5” W 75˚46’00.6”	EARLY SETTLERS Included Joseph Juliand, Simon Barnett, and Stephen Ketchum. In 1795 Talleyrand visited early French settlement here.
Greene, Town of, New York	GREENE	Historic marker of the village of Greene, NY. Laid out in 1806 by Elisha Smith. First called Hornby, renamed for General Nathaniel Greene.	State Education Department 1936	Park at Cutler Road, North Washington Street, and North Chenango Street, Greene, NY	Greene, Town of, New York	N 42˚20’12.3” W 75˚45’57.1”	GREENE Village laid out in 1806 by Elisha Smith. Was first called Hornby, later named for Gen. Nathaniel Greene. Incorporated 1842.
Greene, Town of, New York	FIRST HOTEL	Historic marker of the first hotel in Greene, NY built 1803 by Thomas Wattles.		South Chenango Street at intersection of Genesee Street, Greene, NY	Greene, Town of, New York	N 42˚19’45.1” W 75˚46’12.4”	FIRST HOTEL In Greene Erected On This Site In 1803 By Thomas Wattles
Greene, Town of, New York	STEPHEN KETCHUM	Historic marker of Stephen Ketchum's log cabin, built, 1792 in Greene, NY.		Corner of South Chenango Street, Greene, NY	Greene, Town of, New York	N 42˚19’45.0” W 75˚46’12.0”	STEPHEN KETCHUM Settled near this site in the Town of and built his log cabin in 1792
Greene, Town of, New York	WILCOX HOMESTEAD	Historic marker of Wilcox Homestead, Greene, NY	State Education Department 1938	NYS Route 12 north of Greene, NY, between Elmer Smith Road and Chenango County. Route 3A	Greene, Town of, New York	N 42°20’59.2” W 75°44’06.7”	WILCOX HOMESTEAD First tavern in the Town of erected on this site by Conrad Sharp, 1794. First Town Meeting Held Here in 1798
Guilford, Town of, New York	FIRST DOCTOR	Historic marker of Dr. John Clark the first doctor in Guilford, NY.	Guilford Bicentennial Historical Committee 1995	Main Street, Guilford, NY	Guilford, Town of, New York	N 42°24’17.6” W 75°29’25.3”	FIRST DOCTOR Site of First Office and Residence Dr. John Clark
Guilford, Town of, New York	FIRST LOG CABIN	Historic marker of the first log cabin, Guilford, NY.	Guilford Bicentennial Historical Committee 1995	Main Street, Guilford, NY	Guilford, Town of, New York	N 42°24’22.9” W 75°29’32.0”	FIRST LOG CABIN Site of The First Log Cabin Dec. 25, 1795 Replaced by Dibbles Tavern - 1798
McDonough, Town of, New York	EARLY INDUSTRY	Historic marker of early industry of 1820-1935 in McDonough, NY	Erected 1976	NYS Route 220 by Creek Road, Pharsalia, NY	McDonough, Town of, New York	N 42°29’52.7” W 75°45’26.5”	EARLY INDUSTRY From here to the lake were located Sawmill – Tannery - Papermill – Sanford Tool Woolen Mill – Machine Shop - Grist Mill - Sawmill 1820-1935
McDonough, Town of, New York	KELLY GRANGE				McDonough, Town of, New York	N 42˚29’34.3” W 75˚44’33.3”	KELLY GRANGE
McDonough, Town of, New York	MCDONOUGH	Historic marker of the Town of McDonough, NY.			McDonough, Town of, New York	N 42°29’55.2” W 75°46’03.6”	TOWN OF MCDONOUGH Set off from Town of Preston April 17, 1816. Named for Commodore Thomas MacDonough, 1783-1825
New Berlin, Town of, New York	JOHN P. USHER	Historic marker of John P. Usher, New Berlin, NY. Secretary of the Interior under President Lincoln.	Erected 2002	NYS Route 8 north of Village of New Berlin, NY, north end of park	New Berlin, Town of, New York	N 42°7’38.6” W 75°19’56.1”	JOHN P. USHER Secretary of Interior under Abraham Lincoln Practiced law in New Berlin with John Hyde 1837-1839
New Berlin, Town of, New York	HISTORIC LAW OFFICE	Historic marker of Law Office, 1830-1995, New Berlin, NY		NYS Route 8, center of Village of New Berlin, NY	New Berlin, Town of, New York	N 42°7’24.7” W 75°19’56.2”	HISTORIC LAW OFFICE Erected in the early 19th century and continuously occupied by local attorneys from CA. 1830-1995. Attorneys included: General A.C. Welch H.H. Harrington, A.C. Morse, and James Honeywell
New Berlin, Town of, New York	NEW BERLIN	Historic marker of Anson Burlingame, New Berlin, NY	State Ed. Dept. 1935	NYS Route 8 south of Village of New Berlin, NY	New Berlin, Town of, New York	N 42°37’05.3” W 75°19’58.7”	NEW BERLIN First settled about 1790 Anson Burlingame born here U.S. Minister to under President Lincoln
New Berlin, Town of, New York	NYO&W Depot	Historic marker of N.Y. O & W Depot, New Berlin, NY.	Unadilla Valley Railway Soc.	Genesee Street (east) and Railroad Street, New Berlin, NY	New Berlin, Town of, New York	N 42°37’28.9” W 75°19’43.3”	N.Y.O.&.W. Depot 1869 Board & Batten Depot- Largest Built by N.Y. Oswego Midland and R.R. its size shows how important New Berlin was to the railroad.
New Berlin, Town of, New York	SITE OF DANIEL SCRIBNER'S HOME	Historic marker of Daniel Scribner's home, built 1790, first in township, New Berlin, NY.	Scribner's Cemetery Association-Town of New Berlin 2002	NYS Route 8, 2 mile south of Village of New Berlin, NY	New Berlin, Town of, New York	N 42°35’29.5” W 75°20’12.7”	SITE OF DANIEL SCRIBNER'S HOME Built 1790, First house in 16th Township. Large log building used as trading post and for town meetings
New Berlin, Town of, New York	ST ANDREWS CHURCH AND CEMETERY	Historic marker of St. Andrews Church and cemetery, New Berlin, NY.	St. Andrews Church and Cemetery 2002	NYS Route 8 in Village of New Berlin, NY, south of St. Andrews Church	New Berlin, Town of, New York	N42°37’18.0” W 75°19’55.5”	ST ANDREWS CHURCH AND CEMETERY Worship began in 1808 led by Fr. Daniel Nash. First Episcopal Church in Chenango. Cemetery owned by church.
North Norwich, Town of, New York	OBADIAH GERMAN	Historic marker of 1798 North Norwich home of Obadiah German, first US Senator Chenango County, NY.	Sesquicentennial 1849-1999	Chenango County Road 23 & 23A in front of Town Hall, former schoolhouse in village of North Norwich, NY	North Norwich, Town of, New York	N 42°37'5.3" W 75°31'38.5"	OBADIAH GERMAN On this site, 1798, stood the home of Obadiah German; Militia General - Land Agent - State Assemblyman - United States Senator 1809-1815
Norwich, Town of, New York	AVERY POWER	Historic marker of Avery Power, Norwich, NY	State Education Department 1936	NYS Route 12, 1 mile south of City of Norwich, NY	Norwich, Town of, New York	N 42°30'37.2" W 75°31'21.1"	AVERY POWER First settler in Norwich 1788, owned adjoining river flat. Lucy Power, first white native (born) of Chenango valley.
Norwich, Town of, New York	CANASAWACTA CREEK	Historic marker of Canasawacta Creek, Norwich, NY	N.Y. State Highway	NYS Route 12, between the Canasawacta Creek and the entrance to Mt. Hope Cemetery, south of the City of Norwich, NY	Norwich, Town of, New York	N 42 31’09.4” W 75 31’22.4”	CANASAWACTA CREEK
Norwich, City of, New York	1789	Historic marker of Captain John Harris, Norwich, NY	State Education Department 1936	NYS Route 12, north of NYS Route 23 intersection in Norwich, NY	Norwich, City of, New York	N 42°32’17.3” W 75°31’27.4”	1789 Capt. John Harris, seaman and pioneer, bought land from Broad Street to river. First town meeting held in his home.
Norwich, City of, New York	FIRST LOG CABIN	Historic marker of log cabin built by Colonel William Monroe.	State Education Department 1936	NYS Route 12, City of Norwich, NY, West Park in front of Chenango County Courthouse	Norwich, City of, New York	N 42 31’54.2” W 75 31’28.7”	FIRST LOG CABIN In Norwich was built on this site about 1790 by Colonel William Monroe “Drummer Boy of the Revolutionary War.”
Norwich, City of, New York	O&W RAILROAD YARDS	Historic marker of the O & W Railroad yards of Norwich, NY		Midland Drive, in front of Norwich High School, City of Norwich, NY	Norwich, City of, New York	N 42°31’40.1” W 75°30’52.5”	RAILROAD YARDS On This Site Were Located Northern Division Offices, Yards, Repair Shops, of the New York, Ontario & Western Railway 1868-1957
Norwich, Town of, New York	RUTH BENEDICT	Historic marker of the childhood home of Dr. Ruth Benedict. A well known anthropologist and author of Patterns of Culture.		NYS Route 12 south of the City of Norwich, NY and Unisom/GE Plant. Red house with white trim	Norwich, Town of, New York	N 42°29’36.5” W 75°31’56.5”	RUTH BENEDICT 1887-1948 Childhood Home of Dr. Ruth Benedict. First Well – Known Woman Anthropologist. Author, Patterns of Culture
Norwich, Town of, New York	THE CASTLE	Historic marker of "The Castle" of Norwich, NY	State Education Department 1936	East River Road, south of Polkville, NY, 1/2 mile on west side of road	Norwich, Town of, New York	N 42°30’41.8” W 75°30’32.1”	¼ Mile West “THE CASTLE” Oneida Indian Fort Councils held here up to 1790
Norwich, Town of, New York	WARNING CURVE	Historic marker of the Warning curve, Norwich, NY.	New York State Highway	NYS Route 12 south of the City of Norwich, NY, past the cemetery	Norwich, Town of, New York	N 42°30’30.0” W 75°31’21.2”	WARNING CURVE
Norwich, Town of, New York	WHITE STORE CHURCH	Historic marker of the White Store Church, Norwich, NY	State Education Department 1935	NYS Route 8 at White Store Cemetery, Norwich, NY	Norwich, Town of, New York	N 42°29'1.6" W 75°24'18.4"	WHITE STORE CHURCH Built 1820 by Baptists, Methodists, and Universalists. Church in original form except pulpit lowered in 1863.
Norwich, Town of, New York	WILLIAM MONOROE DRUMMER BOY	Historic marker of site of first log cabin built in Norwich, NY by Colonel William Monroe.		NYS Route 12, center of the City of Norwich, NY, on West Side Park by the Chenango County Court House	Norwich, City of, New York	N 42°31’54.2” W 75°31’28.7”	FIRST LOG CABIN Revolutionary Drummer Boy’s House – William Monroe
Norwich, Town of, New York	FLY MEADOW CREEK	Historic marker of Fly Meadow Creek, Oxford, NY	NY State Highway	NYS Route 12, at bridge, south of the City of Norwich, NY	Norwich, Town of, New York	N 42°27’38.9” W 75°34”28.7”	FLY MEADOW CREEK
Otselic, Town of, New York	GRACE BROWN	Historic marker of Grace Brown's family home, Otselic, NY	Dedicated 2006 Town of Otselic	Stage Road by Brown Lane, Otselic, NY	Otselic, Town of, New York	N 42°39’29.5” W 75°43’18.3”	GRACE BROWN Mar. 20, 1886-July 11, 1906 The family home her untimely death at Big Moose Lake & resulting trial captivated the nation
Otselic, Town of, New York	GRACE BROWN	Historic marker of Grace Brown, Otselic, NY. The inspiration for Theodore Dreiser's "An American Tragedy".	Dedicated 2006 Town of Otselic	NYS Route 26, Otselic, NY. Below the junction with Gorge Road, by the steps to the cemetery	Otselic, Town of, New York	N 42°38’44.8” W 75°46’57.9”	GRACE BROWN Whose Life & Death Inspired Theodore Dreiser's "An American Tragedy" Her Final Resting Place in the Valley She loved
Oxford, Village of, New York	SITE OF ANCIENT INDIAN FORT	Historic marker of Indian Fort found in 1791, Oxford, NY	State Education Department 1938	NYS Route 220, in front of Oxford Middle School, Oxford, NY	Oxford, Village of, New York	N 42°26'26.2" W 26.2"75°35"	SITE OF ANCIENT INDIAN FORT In 1791 early settlers found evidence of this fort having been in use for many years.
Oxford, Village of, New York	CONGREGATIONAL CHURCH	Historic marker of the Congregational Church in the village of Oxford, NY.	State Education Department 1938	Fort Hill Park, east side, Oxford, NY	Oxford, Village of, New York	N 42°26'25.8 W 75°35' 45.2	CONGREGATIONAL CHURCH Oldest church edifice standing in the Village. Dedicated July 31, 1823
Oxford, Village of, New York	FIRST SITE OF OXFORD ACADEMY	Historic marker of the first site of the Oxford Academy, Oxford, NY.	State Education Department 1938	NYS Route 220 on Washington Park, Oxford, NY	Oxford, Village of, New York	N 42°39’43.0” W 75°19’55.8”	FIRST SITE OF OXFORD ACADEMY Charted granted 1794. Uri Tracy, first principal. One of the first four charters granted west of Hudson River.
Oxford, Village of, New York	BALDWIN HOME	Historic marker of the Baldwin Home, Oxford, NY.	Replaced by Co. Bicentennial “82	West of Washington Ave. on West State Street, Oxford, NY	Oxford, Village of, New York	N 42°26’33.7” W 75°35’56.5”	BALDWIN HOME Site of home built by Jonathan Baldwin in 1794. Builder 1st school, many houses & 2nd river bridge, moved west of P.O. in 1939.
Oxford, Village of, New York	JUNCTION OF ITHACA-CATSKILL TURNPIKE	Historic marker of the Ithaca Catskill Turnpike, Oxford, NY.	State Education Department 1938	Washington Avenue and Lafayette Park, Oxford, NY	Oxford, Village of, New York	N 42°26’33.2” W 75°35’53.5”	JUNCTION OF Ithaca-Catskill turnpike and the Utica-Binghamton line of Post Coaches. Stage route and mail line formed in 1822
Oxford, Village of, New York	OXFORD FIRST TOWN MEETING	Historical marker of Oxford, NY, first town meeting, April 1794, village incorporated April 6, 1806.	State Education Department 1938	NY State Route 12 and Lafayette Park, Oxford, NY	Oxford, Village of, New York	N 42°26’32.2” W 75°35’51.5”	OXFORD First town meeting held in April 1794. Incorporated as village .
Oxford, Village of, New York	SITE OF LOG HOUSE	Historic marker at the site of Benjamin Hovey log house, Oxford, NY	State Education Department 1938	Park in front of Oxford High School, Oxford, NY	Oxford, Village of, New York		SITE OF LOG HOUSE Built by Benjamin Hovey 1790, who served in the Revolution and was known as “Father of the Settlement”
Oxford, Village of, New York	SITE OF ST. PAUL'S EPISCOPAL CHURCH	Historic marker of the site of St. Paul's Episcopal Church, first church edifice in village of Oxford, NY.	State Education Department 1938	Park in front of Oxford High School, Oxford, NY	Oxford, Village of, New York		SITE OF St. Paul’s Episcopal church, erected in 1816. The first church edifice in the village of Oxford. .
Oxford, Town of, New York	LYON BROOK BRIDGE	Historic marker of NY & Oswego Midland Railroad, Lyon Brook Bridge, Oxford, NY	Chenango County Historical Society, Ontario & Western Railway Historical Society	Chenango County Highway 32 at Lyon Brook Road, between Norwich and Oxford, NY	Oxford, Town of, New York	N 42°27'44.7" W 75°32'54.6"	LYON BROOK BRIDGE Erected by the New York & Oswego Midland Railroad in 1869, It spanned 1,200 feet & was 156 feet high. Site ½ mile east of here.
Oxford, Town of, New York	LAKE WARN	Historic maker of Lake Warn, Oxford, NY	NYS ED Department 1938	NYS Route 12 between Brisben and Oxford, NY	Oxford, Town of, New York	N 42°22'49.1 W 75°38'49.3"	LAKE WARN According to tradition burial place of Thick Neck, giant Chief of the Antones, a tribe of the Tuscaroras killed by the Oneidas.
Pharsalia, Town of, New York	GAME REFUGE	Historic marker of Game Refuge, Pharsalia, NY	NYS Ed & Cons Dept 1955?	NYS Route 23 at Benedict Hill Road, Pharsalia, NY	Pharsalia, Town of, New York	N 42°40'59" W 75°31'1"	1885-1935 GAME REFUGE Pharsalia Refuge 1 mile The first area acquired by New York State for wild life management purposes purchases begun in 1926.
Plymouth, Town of, New York	DEPOT BUILT 1869	Historic marker of NY & OM Railroad, Auburn branch, operated by O & W Railroad. Restored in 1979 by the Plymouth Historical Society to use as Town Museum.		Chenango County Route 16, east of Village of Plymouth, NY	Plymouth, Town of, New York	N 42°37’00.4” W 75° 36’07.0”	DEPOT BUILT 1869 by NY & OM RR Auburn Branch operated by O&W 1874-1879 Restored in 1979 by Plymouth Historical Society as a Town Museum
Preston, Town of, New York	SCHOOL HOUSE	Historic marker on the site of one room schoolhouse, Ross School District 3, Preston, NY. 1850-1917.	Chenango Co. Hist. Society	Chenango County Route 10, east of Village of Preston, NY	Preston, Town of, New York	N 42°32’26.2” W 75°34’53.2”	SCHOOL SITE Site one room Ross School Dist 3 ca. 1850-1917 Moved by Kiwanis to Chen Co. Museum Grounds Norwich as Bicentennial Project
Sherburne, Town of, New York	1885 - 1935 GAME FARM	Historic marker of Game Farm in Sherburne, NY	New York State Education and Conservation Departments, 1935	NYS Route 80, west of Chenango County Route 23 and Cush Hill Road, Sherburne, NY	Sherburne, Town of, New York	N 42°40’58.0” W 75°31’00.3”	1885 - 1935 GAME FARM. Sherburne State Game Farm. Established in 1909. The first in and the oldest in continuous operation the
Smyrna, Town of, New York	ALBANY-ITHACA TURNPIKE 100	Historic marker of Albany Ithaca Turnpike, Smyrna, NY	State Education Department 1936	NYS Route 80, east of Chenango County Route.14, Smyrna, NY	Smyrna, Town of, New York	N 42°41’36.0” W 75°33’21.2”	ALBANY-ITHACA TURNPIKE A stake driven here marked 100 miles west from Albany on the Albany-Ithaca Turnpike built in 1805
Sherburne, Town of, New York	FOOTBRIDGE	Historic marker of Rexford Falls, Sherburne, NY	Town of Sherburne	NYS Route 80 at Rexford Falls, east of Sherburne, NY	Sherburne, Town of, New York	N 42°40’46.8” W 75°28’15.9”	2006 Rexford Falls Footbridge Restoration Herbert H. & Mariea L. Brown Foundation
Sherburne, Town of, New York	WESTERN ORACLE	Historic marker of the Western Oracle, the first newspaper in Chenango County, NY.	Replaced by Co. Bicentennial "82	Chenango County Route. 20, east of railroad track, at Sherburne Four Corners, Sherburne, NY	Sherburne, Town of, New York	N 42°39’03.5” W 75°34’44.3”	WESTERN ORACLE The first newspaper in Chenango County, the Western Oracle published on this site in 1803, by Abraham and Nicholas Romeyn.
Sherburne, Town of, New York	WEST HILL 1802	Historic marker of burial of Colonel William S. Smith, Sherburne, NY	State Education Department 1936	NYS Route 80, two miles northwest of Sherburne, NY, at entrance to West Hill Cemetery, Sherburne, NY	Sherburne, Town of, New York	N 42°41’38.5” W 75°31’59.1”	West Hill-1802 Colonel William S. Smith. Aide to Washington, owned 150,000 acres hereabout in 1791, married Abigail Adams. Buried at rear, due north.
Smithville, Town of, New York	TARBELL FARMS	Historic marker of Tarbell Farms, Smithville, NY	NYSDEC	NYS Route. 41 at Tarbell Road, Smithville, NY	Smithville, Town of, New York	N 42°25’00.9” W 75°49’56.5”	1875-1963 TARBELL FARMS Site of a Renowned Guernsey Dairy Farm Golden Guernsey milk was once shipped to New York Citys finest restaurants
Smyrna, Town of, New York	BRIGHAM YOUNG	Historic marker of the boyhood home of Brigham Young. Cole Road, Smyrna, NY	Chenango Co. Bicentennial ‘82 (Replaced after 1981)	Chenango County Route 21, at Cole Road, Smyrna, NY	Smyrna, Town of, New York	N 42°39’03.5” W 75°34’44.3”	BRIGHAM YOUNG Site of boyhood home of Brigham Young, Mormon leader, is one-half mile no. on Cole Rd. the family went on to Western N.Y.
Oxford, Town of, New York	FORT HILL MILL	Historic marker of Fort Hill mill, Oxford, NY	State Education Department 1938	Chenango River bridge at the Oxford Fire Department, Main Street, Oxford, NY	Oxford, Town of, New York	N 42°26'28.6" W 75°35'46.1"	FORT HILL MILL Built in 1794 by Theodore Burr and Jonathan Baldwin.

== See also ==
- List of New York State Historic Markers
- National Register of Historic Places listings in New York
- List of National Historic Landmarks in New York
