= New York State Route 319 =

Former highway in New York

New York State Route 319
- NY 319 highlighted in red

Route information
- Maintained by NYSDOT and the city of Norwich
- Length: 5.47 mi (8.80 km)
- Existed: 1930–July 1984

Major junctions
- West end: CR 4 / CR 10 / CR 19 in Preston
- East end: NY 12 in Norwich

Location
- Country: United States
- State: New York
- Counties: Chenango

Highway system
- New York Highways; Interstate; US; State; Reference; Parkways
← NY 318	→ NY 320

New York State Route 319 (NY 319) was a state highway in Chenango County, New York, in the United States. It was 5.47 miles (8.80 km) long and connected the hamlet of Preston to the nearby city of Norwich. The route began in the hamlet at an intersection with three county-maintained highways and proceeded eastward through the town of Preston to downtown Norwich, where it terminated at an intersection with NY 12.

What became NY 319 was originally built during the early 19th century as the Norwich and Preston Turnpike, one of many privately maintained turnpikes in the state of New York. The state of New York assumed ownership of the turnpike's routing in the early 20th century, and the Preston–Norwich state highway was designated as NY 319 as part of the 1930 renumbering of state highways in New York. Maintenance of NY 319 was split between the state and the city of Norwich, with the New York State Department of Transportation (NYSDOT) handling the part of the route west of the city limits.

In 1962, the New York State Legislature approved a highway maintenance swap that would transfer the state-maintained section of NY 319 to Chenango County when a new alignment was constructed for NY 23 through the northwestern part of the county. The project was completed in July 1984, at which time the NY 319 designation was completely removed and Chenango County assumed maintenance of the route's former alignment west of Norwich. The new county road was redesignated County Route 10A (CR 10A).

== Route description ==
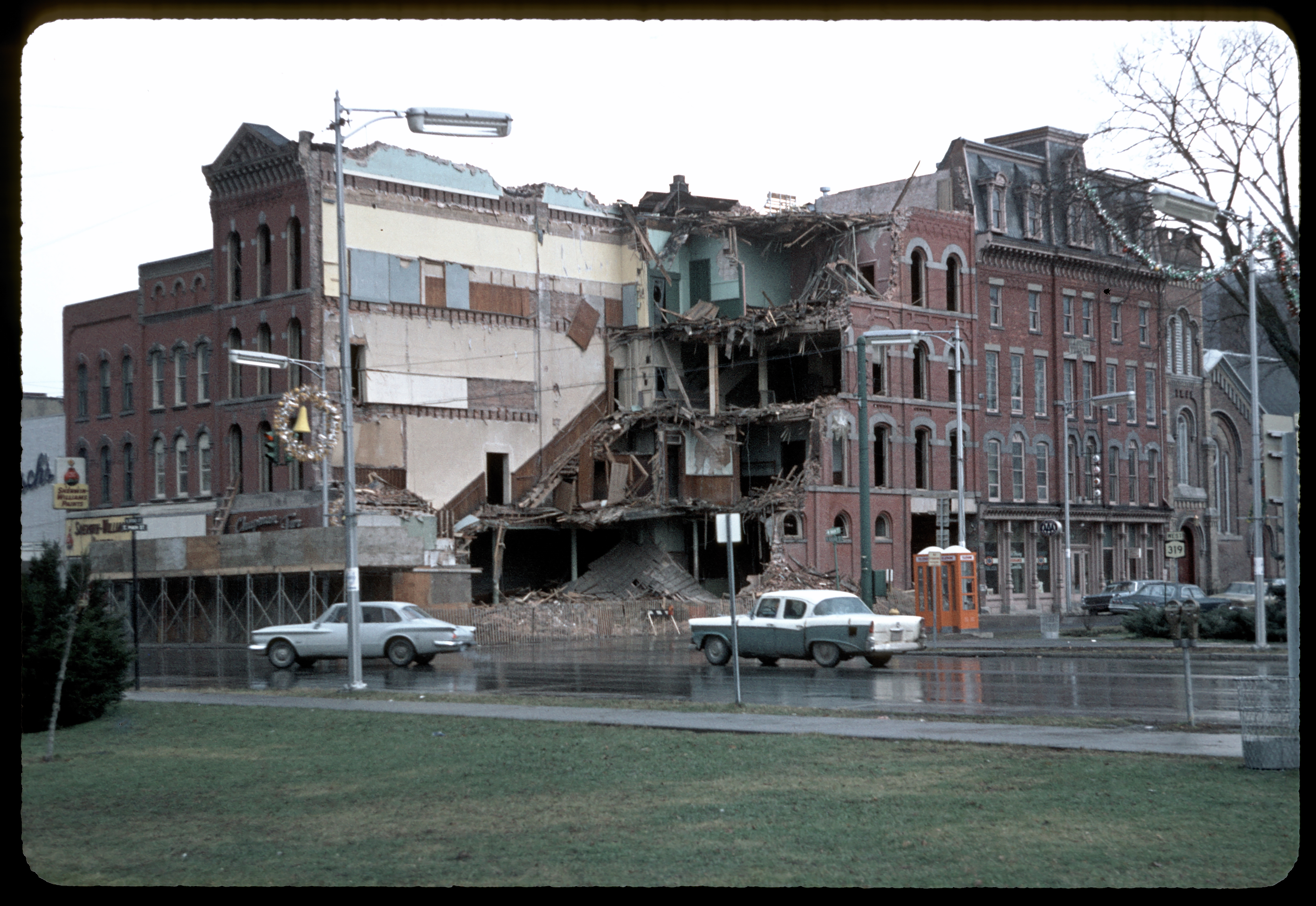
1966 photo of downtown Norwich, where a department store at the junction of Main (NY 319) and Broad (NY 12) streets is in the process of being demolished. The first reassurance marker on NY 319 westbound is at lower right.

NY 319 began at an intersection with three county routes (CR 4, CR 10, and CR 19) in the hamlet of Preston, a small community in the northern portion of the town of the same name. The highway proceeded eastward, climbing the side of a hill approximately 1,560 feet (480 m) above sea level at its peak. NY 319 briefly descended to cross a creek then continued climbing, reaching an elevation of 1,760 feet (540 m) near Packer–Mason Cemetery. The route slowly descended in elevation from the cemetery, crossing Gilmore Brook on its way into the town of Norwich, where it intersected CR 19 for a second time just east of the town line. Past CR 19, the highway turned southeastward to descend the side of a ridge overlooking the city of Norwich.

At the bottom of the descent, the route turned eastward and crossed over Canasawacta Creek, a tributary of the Chenango River, as it entered the city of Norwich and became known as West Main Street. In Norwich, NY 319 served Emmanuel Episcopal Church and passed through the Chenango County Courthouse District, established in 1975 in the city's downtown area. In the center of the historic district, NY 319 reached its eastern terminus at its intersection with NY 12 (Broad Street). West Main Street becomes East Main Street at this junction, and the latter continues eastward as NY 990L, one of New York's reference routes.

== History ==
=== Norwich and Preston Turnpike ===
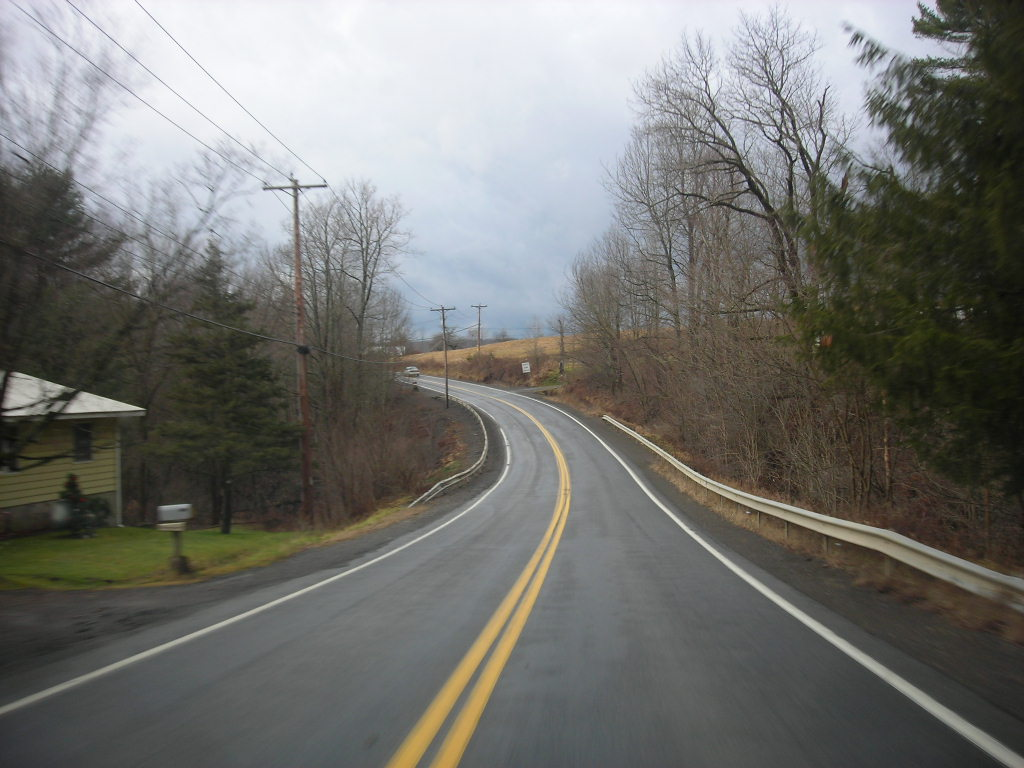
Westbound on former NY 319 just east of the hamlet of Preston

The town of Norwich was created on January 19, 1793, comprising a much larger area than it does today. On April 2, 1806, part of the town was split off to form a new town named Preston. A charter on April 8, 1808, established the Norwich and Preston Turnpike, a turnpike connecting the town of Preston in the west to the town of Norwich in the east. The Norwich and Preston Turnpike was privately owned and maintained, as most turnpikes in New York were at the time.

The routing of the Norwich and Preston Turnpike was taken over by the state of New York in the early 20th century. On December 14, 1907, a contract was let to improve a 4.86-mile (7.82 km) long portion of the former turnpike. Construction cost $57,714 (equivalent to $2.02 million in 2024) and was completed by late 1908. The improved highway was added to the state highway system on November 16, 1908, as State Highway 598 (SH 598). A second contract to improve an additional 0.22 miles (0.35 km) of the turnpike was let on April 9, 1910. Work on this segment cost approximately $6,000 (equivalent to $202,479 in 2024) and was completed by mid-1911. This section of the turnpike was added to the state highway system on July 22, 1911 as SH 598A. The first set of posted routes in New York were assigned in 1924; however, none of the former Norwich and Preston Turnpike was assigned a designation at that time.

=== Designation and removal ===
In the 1930 renumbering of state highways in New York, several of the routes assigned during the 1920s were renumbered or modified. At the same time, hundreds of state-maintained highways which did not yet have a route number, such as the Preston–Norwich state highway, were assigned one. The road was designated as NY 319 and maintained by the New York State Department of Transportation west of the Norwich city limits and by the city of Norwich within the city. The alignment of NY 319 remained unchanged for the next half-century.

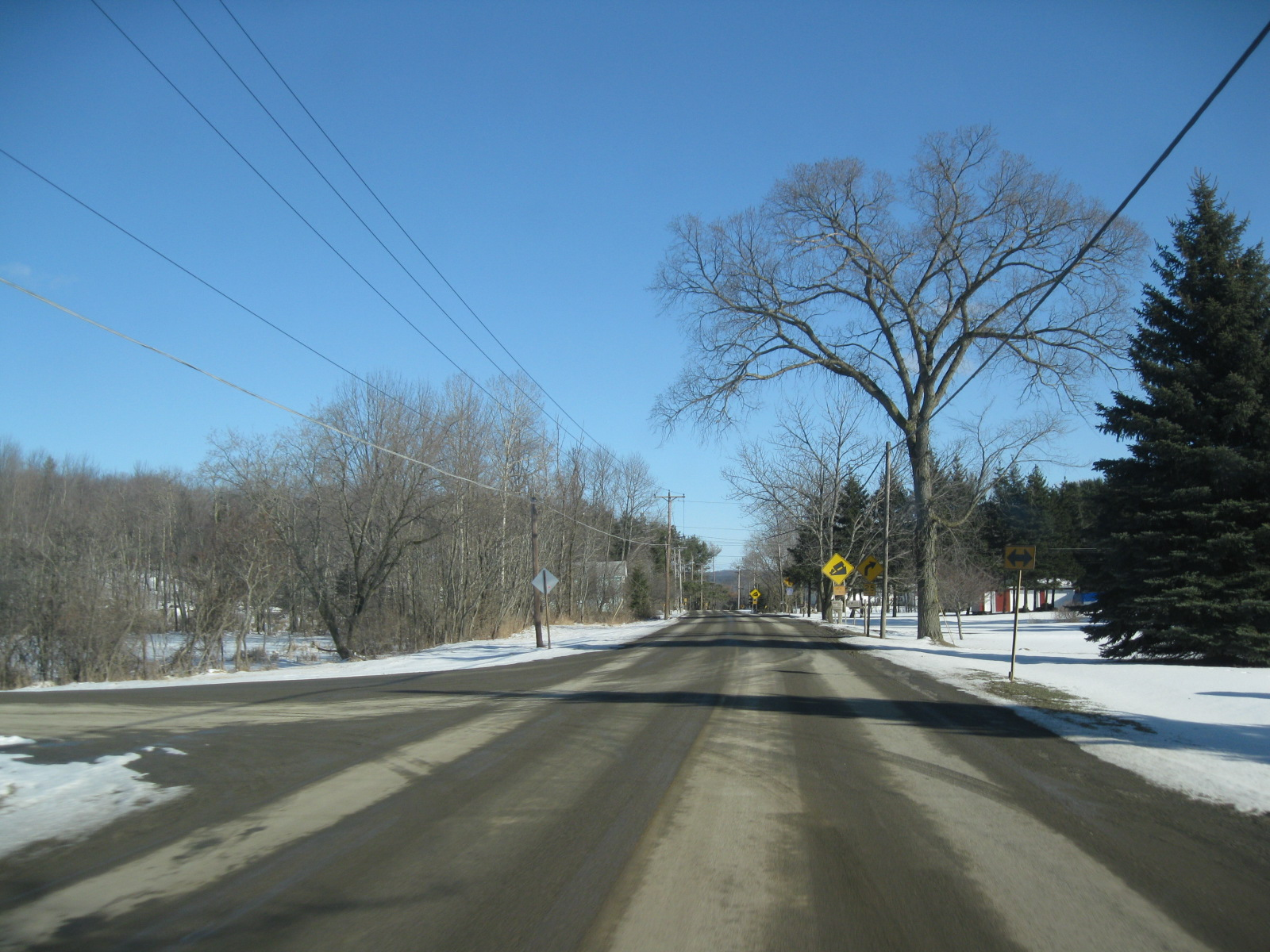
Eastbound on former NY 319 at the eastern intersection with CR 19

Ownership and maintenance of NY 319 west of the Norwich city limits was slated to be transferred from the state of New York to Chenango County as part of a highway maintenance swap approved by the New York State Legislature and signed into law on February 13, 1962. However, the swap in maintenance was contingent on the construction and completion of a new alignment for NY 23 in northwestern Chenango County. The new road would extend from the Chenango–Cortland county border in the town of Pitcher to Scotts Corners in the town of Pharsalia, a point 2 miles (3.2 km) west of the hamlet of North Pharsalia. At the time, NY 23 began at NY 26 in northwest Pharsalia and followed an easterly and southerly routing to Scotts Corners, where it turned eastward onto its modern alignment. The portion of the exchange describing the roads that would be transferred to Chenango County is written in New York State Highway Law as follows, with annotations in parentheses:

to enter an official order of abandonment to the county of Chenango of that portion of state highway eight hundred seven (NY 23) easterly and southeasterly from state highways eight thousand one hundred sixty-one and six hundred sixty-three (NY 26) to its intersection with the [new alignment of NY 23], all of state highways five hundred ninety-eight-a and five hundred ninety-eight (NY 319)

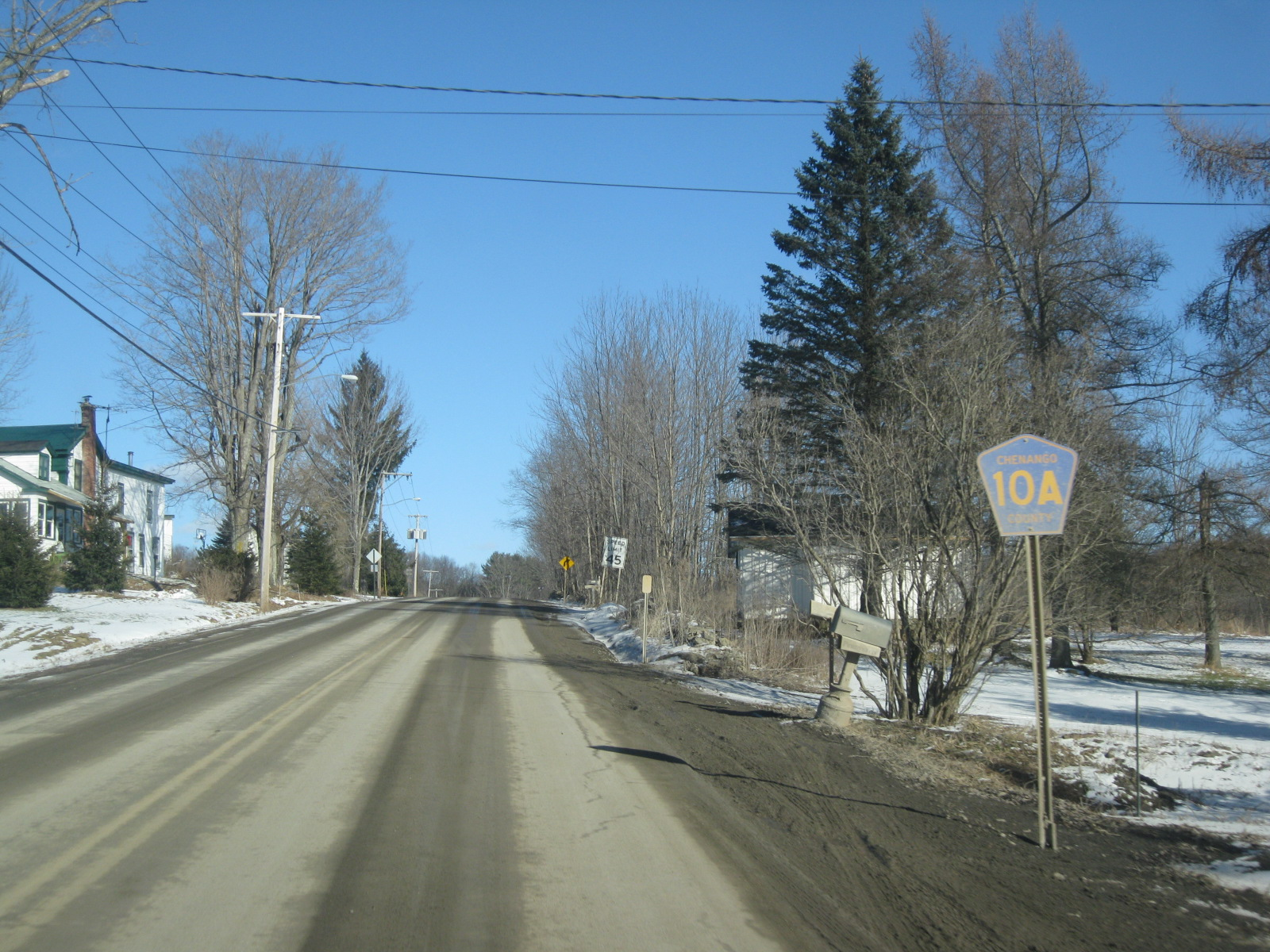
Eastbound on CR 10A (former NY 319) just east of its western terminus in Preston

The new highway in the towns of Pitcher and Pharsalia was completed in July 1984, at which time NY 23 was rerouted to follow the highway and the entirety of the pre-approved highway maintenance swap went into effect. Thus, ownership and maintenance of NY 23's old alignment through Pharsalia and the entirety of NY 319 west of Norwich was transferred to Chenango County. The former alignment of NY 23 became CR 42 while the now county-maintained section of NY 319 was redesignated CR 10A, a spur of the pre-existing CR 10. The NY 319 designation was also removed from West Main Street in the city of Norwich at this time.

=== Post-designation ===
In 1997, the bridge that had carried NY 319 over Gilmore Brook in the town of Preston was replaced. The new 29-foot-long (8.8 m) structure handles an average of 1,154 vehicles per day. Farther east, the 74-foot-long (23 m) bridge over Canasawacta Creek was also reconstructed in 1997. It was built in 1937 and carries an average of 2,093 cars per day.

== Major intersections ==
The entire route was in Chenango County.

Location	mi	km	Destinations	Notes
Preston	0.00	0.00	CR 4 / CR 10 / CR 19	Western terminus of CR 19
Town of Norwich	3.49	5.62	CR 19	Eastern terminus of CR 19
City of Norwich	5.47	8.80	NY 12 (Broad Street)	
1.000 mi = 1.609 km; 1.000 km = 0.621 mi

== See also ==
- List of county routes in Chenango County, New York
- List of former state routes in New York (301–400)
