= New York State Route 320 =

State highway in Chenango County, New York, US

New York State Route 320
- Map of the Norwich area with NY 320 highlighted in red

Route information
- Maintained by NYSDOT
- Length: 3.55 mi (5.71 km)
- Existed: 1930–present

Major junctions
- West end: NY 12 in Norwich
- East end: CR 29 in North Norwich

Location
- Country: United States
- State: New York
- Counties: Chenango

Highway system
- New York Highways; Interstate; US; State; Reference; Parkways
← NY 319	→ NY 321

New York State Route 320 (NY 320) is an east–west state highway located within Chenango County in the central part of New York in the United States. It extends for 3.55 miles (5.71 km) from an intersection with NY 12 north of the city of Norwich to a junction with Tiffany Road in the town of North Norwich. The road shifts from state to county maintenance at the latter junction, and NY 320's right-of-way continues northeast from Tiffany Road as County Route 29 (CR 29). NY 320 was assigned as part of the 1930 renumbering of state highways in New York.

== Route description ==
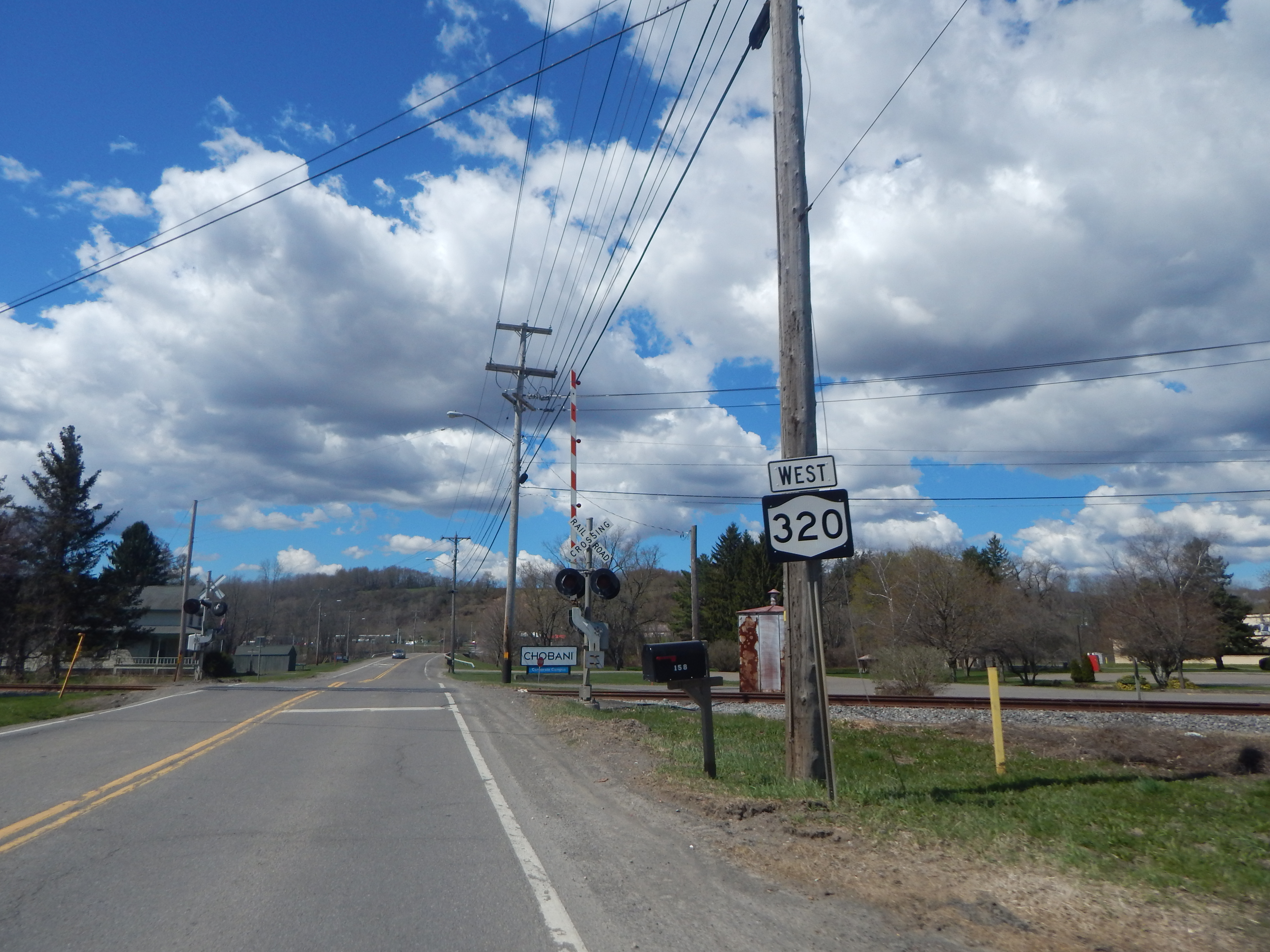
NY 320 at the New York, Susquehanna and Western Railway in Norwich

NY 320 begins a half-mile (0.8 km) north of the Norwich city limits at an intersection with NY 12 in the town of Norwich. The highway heads to the northeast as a two-lane road, serving a commercial area along the southern edge of Lt. Warren Eaton Airport. It crosses over the Chenango River and a grade crossing with the New York, Susquehanna and Western Railway prior to intersecting CR 32 (East River Road). Past the junction, the commercial establishments give way to homes as the route continues to head away from the Norwich area. Near the eastern edge of a valley surrounding the Chenango River, NY 320 briefly turns eastward, running along the Norwich–North Norwich town line and crossing over Thompson Creek, a tributary of the Chenango River. After a quarter-mile (0.4 km), NY 320 curves back to the northeast and fully enters North Norwich. The route loosely parallels Thompson Creek as it runs uphill from the Chenango River valley, passing gradually fewer homes as it ascends in elevation. Eventually, the residences are replaced by farms as the road reaches a rural intersection with Tiffany Road. At this point, ownership and maintenance of NY 320's right-of-way shifts from the New York State Department of Transportation (NYSDOT) to Chenango County. The change in jurisdiction marks the eastern terminus of NY 320, and the state road's right-of-way continues east to a junction with NY 8 and NY 80 in the village of New Berlin as CR 29, which that route ends at the New Berlin village line and becomes a local road before ending at that intersection.

== History ==
On October 22, 1907, the state of New York awarded a contract to reconstruct what is now NY 320 to state highway standards to the Newport Construction Company. Construction commenced on April 2, 1908 under the charge of engineer H.W. Benkhart. The new road would be constructed as a 12-foot (3.7 m) wide macadam road. This new road would be constructed with 6 inches (15 cm) of macadam from local quarries followed by limestone from Oriskany Falls in Oneida County. The road cost $35,518 to rebuild (equivalent to $1,242,998 in 2024), and it was added to the state highway system on October 15, 1908, as unsigned State Highway 597 (SH 597). In the 1930 renumbering of state highways in New York, hundreds of state-maintained highways were assigned a posted route number for the first time. One of these was SH 597, which was designated NY 320. The route's alignment has not been substantially altered since that time.

== Major intersections ==
The entire route is in Chenango County.

Location	mi	km	Destinations	Notes
Town of Norwich	0.00	0.00	NY 12 – Norwich, Sherburne	Western terminus
North Norwich	3.55	5.71	Tiffany Road	
North Norwich	3.55	5.71	CR 29 – New Berlin	Continuation beyond Tiffany Road
1.000 mi = 1.609 km; 1.000 km = 0.621 mi
