= Balsam Lake (New York) =

- Location within New York Location within the United States
- Location: Chenango County, New York, United States
- Coordinates: 42°33′04″N 75°45′48″W
- Type: Lake
- Primary inflows: Balsam Creek
- Primary outflows: Balsam Creek
- Basin countries: United States
- Surface area: 153 acres (0.62 km^{2})
- Average depth: 5 feet (1.5 m)
- Max. depth: 11 ft (3.4 m)
- Surface elevation: 1,660 ft (510 m)
- Settlements: Pharsalia, New York

Balsam Lake is a man-made lake located by Pharsalia, New York. Fish species present in the lake include tiger muskellunge, largemouth bass, pumpkinseed sunfish, pickerel, and yellow perch. There is access via state owned carry down off County Route 7, 4 miles north of McDonough. It is located at an elevation of about 1,660 feet (around 506 meters) above sea level. It covers an area of about 153 acres (around 0.62 km²) and has a maximum depth of about 11 feet, making it relatively shallow.
