= Obadiah German =

American politician (1766–1842)

Speaker of the New York State Assembly
- In office January 6, 1819 – June 30, 1819
- Preceded by: David Woods
- Succeeded by: John C. Spencer

United States Senator from New York
- In office March 4, 1809 – March 3, 1815
- Preceded by: Samuel L. Mitchill
- Succeeded by: Nathan Sanford

Member of the New York State Assembly
- In office 1798; 1804-1805; 1807-1809; 1819

Personal details
- Born: April 22, 1766 Amenia, New York
- Died: September 24, 1842 (aged 76) Norwich, New York
- Resting place: North Norwich Cemetery, North Norwich, New York
- Party: Democratic-Republican; Whig
- Spouse(s): Mary Ann Lewis (d. 1829); Mary Ann Knight (d. 1861)

Obadiah German (April 22, 1766 – September 24, 1842) was an American lawyer and politician. He was most notable for his service as a U.S. Senator from New York (1809-1815) and Speaker of the New York State Assembly in 1819.

== Life ==
He was born on April 22, 1766, in Amenia, New York. He studied law, was admitted to the bar in 1792, and commenced practice in Norwich. A Democratic-Republican, he was a member of the New York State Assembly from 1798 to 1799, 1804 to 1805, and 1807 to 1809.

In 1809, he was elected a U.S. Senator from New York. He served one term, March 4, 1809, to March 3, 1815, and was not a candidate for reelection. German was known as a critic of the lack of military preparations made in advance of the War of 1812, and voted against the declaration of war. In a speech he gave in the Senate on June 13, 1812, German noted the overwhelming strength of Britain:

I will first call the attention of the Senate to the ability and strength of the nation we are about, by this bill, to declare war against. Gentlemen ought to recollect, that Great Britain has been almost constantly engaged in war for twenty years past against one of the most powerful nations that ever existed... Is Great Britain less powerful now, than she was twenty years ago? No, sir, the constant warfare has increased her powers instead of diminishing them.

In 1812, German was one of the founding trustees of Hamilton College. He was First Judge of the Chenango County Court from 1814 to 1819. He was also a State militia officer, eventually becoming a major general.

Supporting DeWitt Clinton's Erie Canal project, German took part in planning and overseeing its construction after being appointed to the state Public Works Commission in 1817. German returned to the Assembly in 1819 as a member of the Clintonian faction of the Democratic-Republican Party and was chosen to serve as Speaker. Afterwards he resumed the practice of law. German became a Whig when that party was organized.

He died on September 24, 1842, in Norwich, New York. He was buried at North Norwich Cemetery in North Norwich, New York.

== Family ==
German had seven children with his first wife, Mary Ann Lewis, known as Ann, who died in 1829.

- Lewis German (d. 1819) was a lieutenant in the United States Navy and a veteran of the War of 1812.
- Morris
- Sutherland
- Albert was an innkeeper in Norwich before moving to Ohio.
- Walter, who succeeded his father in the family's Norwich mercantile business. He served as a militia captain during the War of 1812 and became insolvent after his business failed in 1820.
- Julia, who was the wife of Stephen Anderson of Norwich, and later resided in Wisconsin.
- Maria (d. 1876), who was the wife of Reverend George Harmon and resided in Wisconsin and Ohio.

After the death of his first wife, he married Mary Ann Knight. The couple had two sons. Mary Ann moved to Syracuse with their sons when they were young, while Obadiah continued to live in Norwich.

== Widow ==
Obadiah German's widow Mary Ann Knight claimed to have been defrauded by her brother (some accounts say German's brother) of German's $70,000 estate (about $1.7 million in 2014). She took up residence in Syracuse and became a public charge after being found "in a state of great destitution", her efforts at earning a living through painting and "fancy work" having failed. Her claim to be German's widow was not believed in Syracuse until it was confirmed after her death.

== Legacy ==
The town of German, New York, is named after him.

== Attempts to locate portrait ==
German is one of approximately 50 former senators for whom the U.S. Senate's photo historian has no likeness on file. Attempts to locate one have proved unsuccessful.

== Sources ==
=== Internet ===
- US Senate Photo Historian. "Senators Not Represented in Senate Historical Office Photo Collection". Senate.gov. Washington, DC: Historian of the United States Senate.

U.S. Senate
Preceded by Samuel L. Mitchill	U.S. senator (Class 1) from New York; 1809–1815; Served alongside: John Smith, Rufus King	Succeeded by Nathan Sanford
Political offices
Preceded by David Woods	Speaker of the New York State Assembly; 1819	Succeeded by John C. Spencer
