= East Pharsalia, New York =

- Hamlet
- Location within New York Location within the United States
- Coordinates: 42°33′29″N 75°43′02″W
- Country: United States
- State: New York
- County: Chenango
- Town: Pharsalia
- Elevation: 1,591 ft (485 m)
- Time zone: UTC-5 (Eastern (EST))
  - Summer (DST): UTC-4 (EDT)
- ZIP code: 13758
- Area code: 607
- GNIS feature ID: 949204

East Pharsalia is a hamlet within the town of Pharsalia, Chenango County, New York, United States. The community is 10 miles (16 km) west of Norwich. East Pharsalia had a post office from March 10, 1830 until September 28, 2002; it still has its own ZIP code, 13758.
