= Pharsalia, New York =

- Town

- Location within New York Location within the United States
- Coordinates: 42°36′N 75°45′W
- Country: United States
- State: New York
- County: Chenango

Government
  - Type: Town Council
  - Town Supervisor: Jeremiah J. Micklas (D
  - Town Council: Members' List: • Kenneth L. Granger (R); • Arthur L. Grover (D); • L. Ernie Collier (R); • Darin Smith (D)

Area
  - Total: 39.12 sq mi (101.31 km^{2})
  - Land: 38.81 sq mi (100.53 km^{2})
  - Water: 0.30 sq mi (0.77 km^{2})
- Elevation: 1,883 ft (574 m)

Population (2010)
  - Total: 593
  - Estimate (2019): 569
  - Density: 14.9/sq mi (5.75/km^{2})
- Time zone: UTC-5 (Eastern (EST))
  - Summer (DST): UTC-4 (EDT)
- ZIP Codes: 13155 (South Otselic); 13758 (East Pharsalia); 13801 (McDonough); 13815 (Norwich); 13844 (South Plymouth)
- FIPS code: 36-017-57507
- GNIS feature ID: 0979360

Pharsalia is a town in Chenango County, New York, United States. The population was 593 at the 2010 census. The town was named after Pharsalia, which is a commonly accepted name of the decisive battle in the Great Roman Civil War, where Julius Caesar defeated Pompey in 48 BCE.

Pharsalia is an interior town of Chenango County, located in the western half of the county, northwest of the city of Norwich. Pharsalia has a population of about 570 people as of 2017.

== History ==
The town received its first settler in 1797. Pharsalia was founded from part of the town of Norwich in 1806 as "Stonington". In 1808, the town was renamed "Pharsalia" in the honor of the Battle of Pharsalus.

== Geography ==
According to the United States Census Bureau, the town has a total area of 39.1 square miles (101.3 km^{2}), of which 38.8 square miles (100.5 km^{2}) is land and 0.31 square miles (0.8 km^{2}), or 0.75%, is water.

New York State Route 23 is an east-west highway through the town.

== Demographics ==
Historical population
Census	Pop.	Note	%±
1820	873		—
1830	987		13.1%
1840	1,213		22.9%
1850	1,185		−2.3%
1860	1,261		6.4%
1870	1,141		−9.5%
1880	1,147		0.5%
1890	915		−20.2%
1900	780		−14.8%
1910	657		−15.8%
1920	553		−15.8%
1930	464		−16.1%
1940	676		45.7%
1950	480		−29.0%
1960	515		7.3%
1970	520		1.0%
1980	606		16.5%
1990	735		21.3%
2000	542		−26.3%
2010	593		9.4%
2019 (est.)	569		−4.0%
U.S. Decennial Census

As of the census of 2000, there were 542 people, 200 households, and 154 families residing in the town. The population density was 14.0 inhabitants per square mile (5.4/km^{2}). There were 333 housing units at an average density of 8.6 per square mile (3.3/km^{2}). The racial makeup of the town was 98.71% White, 0.55% African American, 0.18% Native American, and 0.55% from two or more races. Hispanic or Latino of any race were 0.74% of the population.

There were 200 households, out of which 40.0% had children under the age of 18 living with them, 59.5% were married couples living together, 10.0% had a female householder with no husband present, and 23.0% were non-families. 19.5% of all households were made up of individuals, and 9.5% had someone living alone who was 65 years of age or older. The average household size was 2.71 and the average family size was 3.05.

In the town, the population was spread out, with 29.9% under the age of 18, 5.7% from 18 to 24, 29.9% from 25 to 44, 23.4% from 45 to 64, and 11.1% who were 65 years of age or older. The median age was 36 years. For every 100 females, there were 109.3 males. For every 100 females age 18 and over, there were 101.1 males.

The median income for a household in the town was $35,417, and the median income for a family was $37,917. Males had a median income of $25,833 versus $18,750 for females. The per capita income for the town was $17,752. About 19.0% of families and 22.1% of the population were below the poverty line, including 30.0% of those under age 18 and 12.9% of those age 65 or over.

== Communities and locations in Pharsalia ==
- Balsam Lake – A lake located southeast of Pharsalia.
- East Pharsalia – A hamlet southeast of Pharsalia village near the southern town line at the junction of County Roads 8 and 10.
- North Pharsalia – A hamlet northeast of Pharsalia village on NY-23.
- Northwest Corners – A hamlet in the northwestern part of the town.
- Pharsalia – The hamlet of Pharsalia is located on NY-23 near the western town line.
- Pharsalia Wildlife Management Area – A conservation area in the northern part of the town.
- Waldron Corners – A location by the western town line on County Road 42.

== Adjacent towns ==
- Otselic – north
- Smyrna – northeast
- Plymouth – east
- Preston – southeast
- McDonough – south
- German – southwest
- Pitcher – west
