= North Pitcher, New York =

- Hamlet
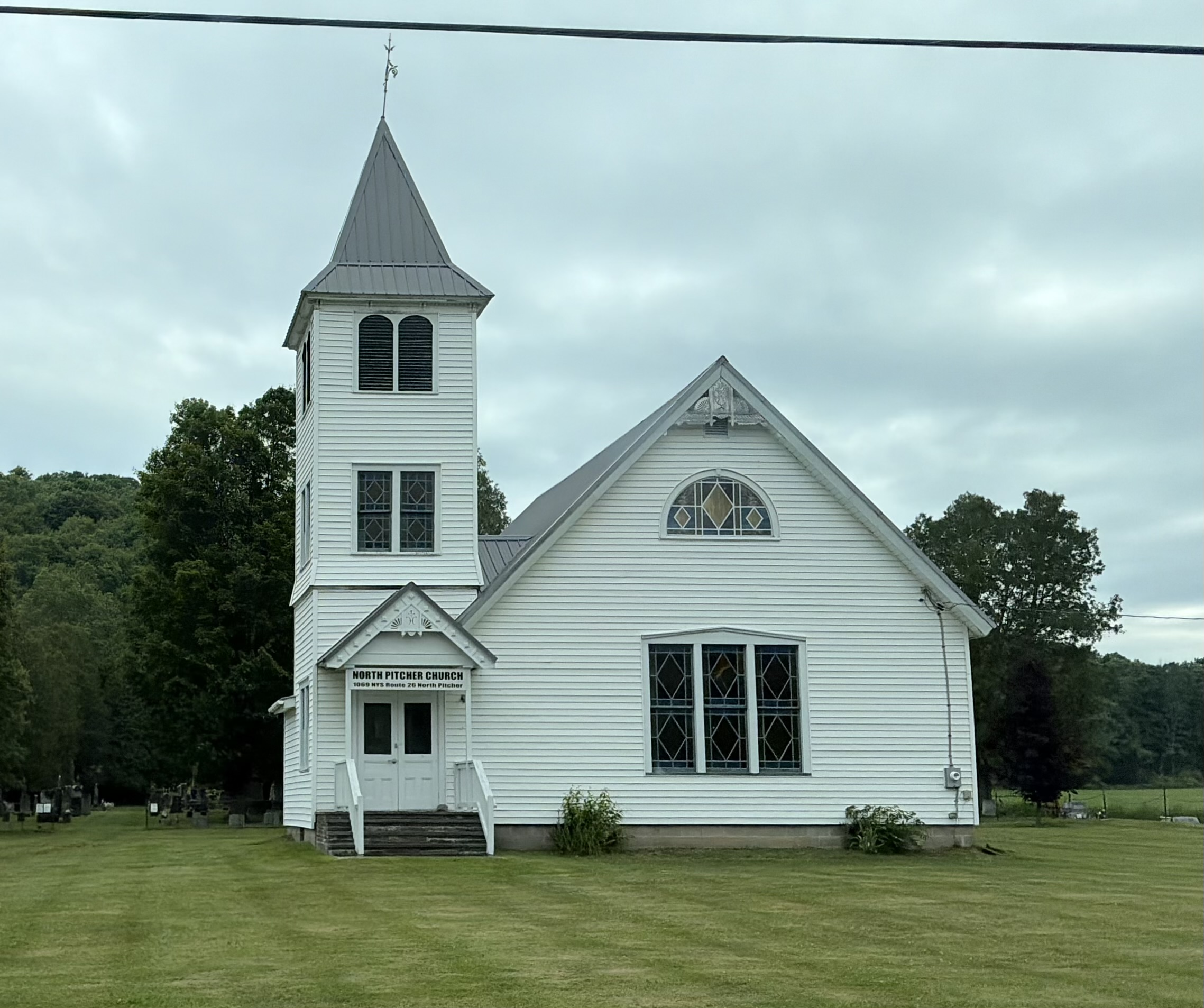
- The former North Pitcher Church on Route 26

- Location within New York Location within the United States
- Coordinates: 42°37′21″N 75°49′11″W
- Country: United States
- State: New York
- County: Chenango
- Town: Pitcher
- Elevation: 1,161 ft (354 m)
- Time zone: UTC-5 (Eastern (EST))
  - Summer (DST): UTC-4 (EDT)
- ZIP code: 13124
- Area codes: 315 & 680
- GNIS feature ID: 958874

North Pitcher is a hamlet in the town of Pitcher, Chenango County, New York, United States. The community is located along New York State Route 26, 16.4 miles (26.4 km) west-northwest of Norwich. North Pitcher has a post office with ZIP code 13124, which opened on March 16, 1824.
