= Lincklaen, New York =

- Town

- Location within the state of New York
- Coordinates: 42°41′13″N 75°50′33″W
- Country: United States
- State: New York
- County: Chenango

Government
  - Type: Town Council
  - Town Supervisor: Sharon Monro (R)
  - Town Council: Members' List: • Harold Baritell (R); • Andrew Holl (R); • Patrick H. Holl (R); • Jeff Hathaway (R)

Area
  - Total: 26.27 sq mi (68.05 km^{2})
  - Land: 26.26 sq mi (68.02 km^{2})
  - Water: 0.012 sq mi (0.03 km^{2})
- Elevation: 1,650 ft (503 m)

Population (2020)
  - Total: 362
  - Estimate (2016): 386
  - Density: 14.7/sq mi (5.67/km^{2})
- Time zone: UTC-5 (Eastern (EST))
  - Summer (DST): UTC-4 (EDT)
- ZIP Codes: 13052 (De Ruyter); 13124 (North Pitcher); 13136 (Pitcher); 13155 (South Otselic)
- FIPS code: 36-017-42411
- GNIS feature ID: 0979151
- Website: townoflincklaen.org

Lincklaen is a town in Chenango County, New York, United States. The population was 392 at the 2020 census. The town was named after Colonel John Lincklaen, an agent of the Holland Land Company and a land owner. The town is in the northwestern corner of the county, northwest of the city Norwich and northeast of Cortland (in Cortland County).

== History ==
The land was first settled circa 1796. Lincklaen was formed from the town of German in 1823. Parts of the town were removed to form the town of Pitcher in 1827 and 1833.

The 1865 population was 988.

== Geography ==
According to the United States Census Bureau, the town has a total area of 26.27 square miles (68.05 km^{2}), of which 26.26 square miles (68.02 km^{2}) is land and 0.01 square miles (0.03 km^{2}), or 0.04%, is water.

The northern town line is the border of Madison County, and the western town line is the border of Cortland County.

Mud Creek is an important stream flowing southward through the town. Via the Otselic, then the Tioughnioga, then the Chenango River, it is part of the watershed of the Susquehanna River flowing to Chesapeake Bay.

== Demographics ==
Historical population
Census	Pop.	Note	%±
1830	1,425		—
1840	1,249		−12.4%
1850	1,196		−4.2%
1860	1,094		−8.5%
1870	926		−15.4%
1880	901		−2.7%
1890	726		−19.4%
1900	646		−11.0%
1910	570		−11.8%
1920	532		−6.7%
1930	447		−16.0%
1940	397		−11.2%
1950	341		−14.1%
1960	364		6.7%
1970	414		13.7%
1980	473		14.3%
1990	486		2.7%
2000	416		−14.4%
2010	396		−4.8%
2020	362		−8.6%
U.S. Decennial Census

As of the census of 2020, there were 362 people, 228 housing units with 145 occupied housing units in the town. The population density was 15.8 inhabitants per square mile (6.1/km^{2}). There were 228 housing units at an average density of 9.2 per square mile (3.6/km^{2}). The racial makeup of the town was 89.5% White, 0% African American, 0.55% Native American, 0% Asian, 2.76% from other races, and 6.9% from two or more races. Hispanic or Latino of any race were 2.76% of the population.

Out of the 145 occupied housing units, 15.19% were children under the age of 18, 60.0% were married couples or living together, 11.5% had a female householder with no spouse present, and 17.7% were male households with no spouse present. The average household size was 2.45.

In the town, the population was spread out, with 15.19% under the age of 18, 0.83% from 18 to 24, 16.3% from 25 to 44, 19.61% from 45 to 64, and 39.0% who were 65 years of age or older. The median age was 56.4 years.

The median income for a household in the town was $62,000, and the median income for a family was $76,250. Nonfamilies had a median income of $38,125. About 9.9% of the population were below the poverty line, including 18.6% of those under age 18 and 6.1% of those age 65 or over.

== Communities and locations in Lincklaen ==
- Burdick Settlement – A former community in the northern part of the town.
- Lincklaen – The hamlet of Lincklaen is by the western town line, located on Mud Creek and County Road 12.
- Lincklaen Center – A hamlet northeast of Lincklaen village, located on Mud Creek.
- Mariposa – A hamlet east of Lincklaen Center, near the eastern town line on County Road 13.
- Rhode Island – A hamlet at the eastern town line on County Road 13.
