= South Plymouth, New York =

- Hamlet
- Location within New York Location within the United States
- Coordinates: 42°34′53″N 75°33′52″W
- Country: United States
- State: New York
- County: Chenango
- Town: Plymouth
- Elevation: 1,138 ft (347 m)
- Time zone: UTC-5 (Eastern (EST))
  - Summer (DST): UTC-4 (EDT)
- ZIP code: 13844
- Area code: 607
- GNIS feature ID: 965843

South Plymouth is a hamlet in the town of Plymouth, Chenango County, New York, United States. The community is located along New York State Route 23, 4 miles (6.4 km) north-northwest of Norwich. South Plymouth has a post office with ZIP code 13844, which opened on April 20, 1848.
