= Columbus, New York =

- Town

- Location within the state of New York
- Coordinates: 42°41′45″N 75°21′38″W
- Country: United States
- State: New York
- County: Chenango

Government
  - Type: Town Council
  - Town Supervisor: Thomas P. Grace (i)
  - Town Council: Members' List: • Susan LaFever (R); • Jane Prohaska (i); • Pamela Weidman (D); • Rodger Adams (R)

Area
  - Total: 37.49 sq mi (97.10 km^{2})
  - Land: 37.37 sq mi (96.78 km^{2})
  - Water: 0.12 sq mi (0.32 km^{2})
- Elevation: 1,427 ft (435 m)

Population (2010)
  - Total: 975
  - Estimate (2016): 946
  - Density: 25.3/sq mi (9.77/km^{2})
- Time zone: UTC-5 (Eastern (EST))
  - Summer (DST): UTC-4 (EDT)
- ZIP Codes: 13411 (New Berlin); 13460 (Sherburne); 13485 (West Edmeston)
- Area code: 607
- FIPS code: 36-017-17486
- GNIS feature ID: 0978856
- Website: townofcolumbusny.com

Columbus is a town in Chenango County, New York, United States. The population was 975 at the 2010 census. Columbus is in the northeastern corner of the county and is northeast of Norwich.

== History ==
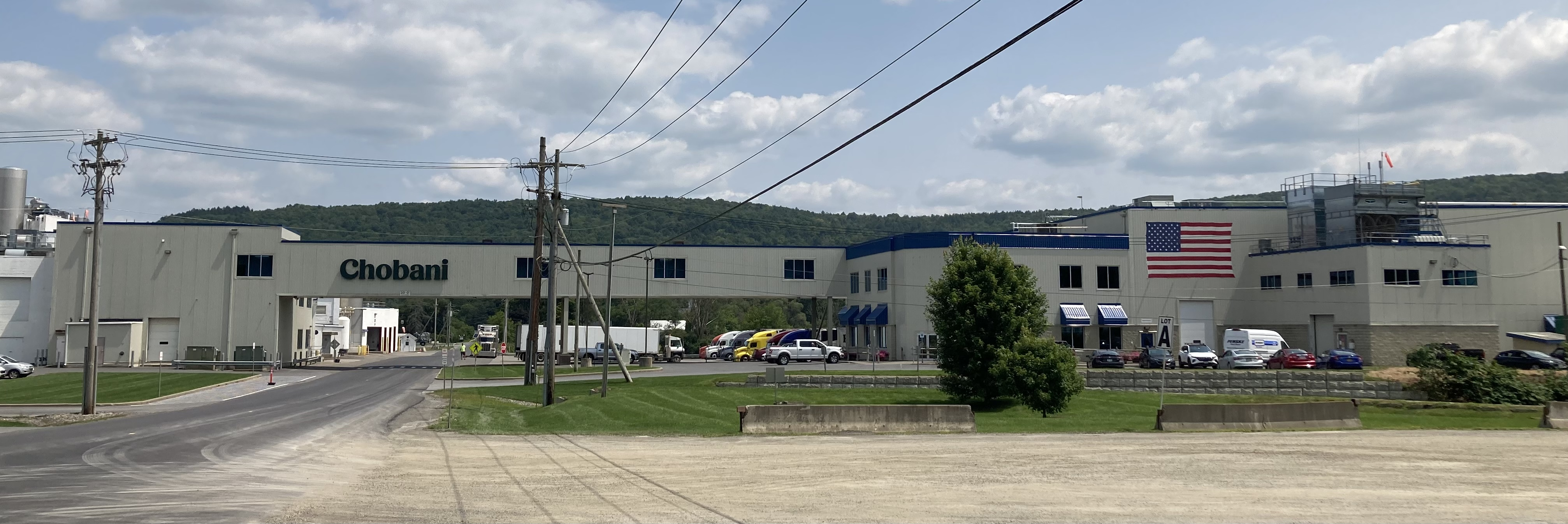
The Chobani yogurt plant in Columbus near South Edmeston.

The area of Columbus was first settled around 1791. The town was formed in 1805 from the town of Brookfield (now in Madison County). Additional territory was obtained from the town of Norwich in 1807.

The Columbus Community Church was added to the National Register of Historic Places in 1986.

Famous companies at Columbus include the makers of Chobani Yogurt and Golden Artist Colors.

== Geography ==
According to the United States Census Bureau, the town has a total area of 37.5 square miles (97.1 km^{2}), of which 37.4 square miles (96.8 km^{2}) is land and 0.12 square miles (0.3 km^{2}), or 0.33%, is water.

The northern town line is the border of Madison County, and the eastern town boundary is the border of Otsego County, marked by the Unadilla River, a south-flowing tributary of the Susquehanna River.

New York State Route 8 is a north–south highway by the eastern town line, and New York State Route 80 is an east–west highway.

The hamlet of Columbus is on NY-80 near the geographic center of the town. Columbus Quarter is a hamlet on the Unadilla River in the northeastern part of the town.

== Demographics ==
Historical population
Census	Pop.	Note	%±
1820	1,805		—
1830	1,744		−3.4%
1840	1,561		−10.5%
1850	1,381		−11.5%
1860	1,407		1.9%
1870	1,197		−14.9%
1880	1,177		−1.7%
1890	1,109		−5.8%
1900	997		−10.1%
1910	838		−15.9%
1920	683		−18.5%
1930	724		6.0%
1940	711		−1.8%
1950	655		−7.9%
1960	706		7.8%
1970	723		2.4%
1980	802		10.9%
1990	869		8.4%
2000	931		7.1%
2010	975		4.7%
2016 (est.)	946		−3.0%
U.S. Decennial Census

As of the census of 2000, there were 931 people, 342 households, and 243 families residing in the town. The population density was 24.9 inhabitants per square mile (9.6/km^{2}). There were 428 housing units at an average density of 11.4 per square mile (4.4/km^{2}). The racial makeup of the town was 97.64% White, 0.32% African American, 0.11% Native American, 0.11% Asian, 0.64% from other races, and 1.18% from two or more races. Hispanic or Latino of any race were 1.18% of the population.

There were 342 households, out of which 33.6% had children under the age of 18 living with them, 59.9% were married couples living together, 7.3% had a female householder with no husband present, and 28.9% were non-families. 21.6% of all households were made up of individuals, and 9.9% had someone living alone who was 65 years of age or older. The average household size was 2.72 and the average family size was 3.13.

In the town, the population was spread out, with 27.3% under the age of 18, 6.0% from 18 to 24, 29.2% from 25 to 44, 26.2% from 45 to 64, and 11.3% who were 65 years of age or older. The median age was 39 years. For every 100 females, there were 98.5 males. For every 100 females age 18 and over, there were 98.5 males.

The median income for a household in the town was $27,452, and the median income for a family was $31,118. Males had a median income of $23,654 versus $20,952 for females. The per capita income for the town was $13,731. About 15.8% of families and 21.3% of the population were below the poverty line, including 25.9% of those under age 18 and 25.5% of those age 65 or over.
