= German, New York =

- Town

- Location within the state of New York
- Coordinates: 42°29′20″N 75°49′39″W
- Country: United States
- State: New York
- County: Chenango

Government
  - Type: Town Council
  - Town Supervisor: Daniel Jack (D, R)
  - Town Council: Members' List: • Elaine Warren (D, R); • Donald C. Nogva (D, R); • Steven F. Maroney (D, R); • Patricia L. Pittsley (D)

Area
  - Total: 28.44 sq mi (73.66 km^{2})
  - Land: 28.41 sq mi (73.58 km^{2})
  - Water: 0.031 sq mi (0.08 km^{2})
- Elevation: 1,506 ft (459 m)

Population (2010)
  - Total: 370
  - Estimate (2016): 359
  - Density: 12.6/sq mi (4.88/km^{2})
- Time zone: UTC-5 (Eastern (EST))
  - Summer (DST): UTC-4 (EDT)
- ZIP Codes: 13040 (Cincinnatus); 13801 (McDonough)
- FIPS code: 36-017-28739
- GNIS feature ID: 0978996
- Website: townofgerman.com

German is a town in Chenango County, New York, United States. The population was 370 at the 2010 census. The town is named after U.S. Senator Obadiah German, the original land owner. The town is at the western border of the county and is west of Norwich.

== History ==
The first settlers arrived circa 1796. German was founded as the "Town of Brakel" in 1806 from part of the town of DeRuyter (now in Madison County). Later the town was reduced by the formation of newer towns: Otselic (1817), Lincklaen (1823), and part of Pitcher (1827).

The 1865 population of German was 778.

== Geography ==
According to the United States Census Bureau, the town has a total area of 28.5 square miles (73.7 km^{2}), of which 28.4 square miles (73.6 km^{2}) is land and 0.04 square miles (0.1 km^{2}), or 0.11%, is water.

The western town line is the border of Cortland County.

== Demographics ==
Historical population
Census	Pop.	Note	%±
1820	2,675		—
1830	884		−67.0%
1840	965		9.2%
1850	903		−6.4%
1860	781		−13.5%
1870	712		−8.8%
1880	664		−6.7%
1890	542		−18.4%
1900	423		−22.0%
1910	371		−12.3%
1920	365		−1.6%
1930	303		−17.0%
1940	234		−22.8%
1950	245		4.7%
1960	253		3.3%
1970	188		−25.7%
1980	250		33.0%
1990	311		24.4%
2000	378		21.5%
2010	370		−2.1%
2016 (est.)	359		−3.0%
U.S. Decennial Census

As of the census of 2000, there were 378 people, 135 households, and 93 families residing in the town. The population density was 13.3 inhabitants per square mile (5.1/km^{2}). There were 227 housing units at an average density of 8.0 per square mile (3.1/km^{2}). The racial makeup of the town was 97.09% White, 0.79% African American, 1.32% Native American, 0.26% from other races, and 0.53% from two or more races. Hispanic or Latino of any race were 1.32% of the population.

There were 135 households, out of which 39.3% had children under the age of 18 living with them, 57.8% were married couples living together, 5.9% had a female householder with no husband present, and 30.4% were non-families. 23.0% of all households were made up of individuals, and 8.9% had someone living alone who was 65 years of age or older. The average household size was 2.80 and the average family size was 3.32.

In the town, the population was spread out, with 32.3% under the age of 18, 5.8% from 18 to 24, 29.9% from 25 to 44, 23.5% from 45 to 64, and 8.5% who were 65 years of age or older. The median age was 34 years. For every 100 females, there were 112.4 males. For every 100 females age 18 and over, there were 115.1 males.

The median income for a household in the town was $35,288, and the median income for a family was $36,563. Males had a median income of $30,000 versus $17,361 for females. The per capita income for the town was $11,557. About 14.7% of families and 21.2% of the population were below the poverty line, including 21.3% of those under age 18 and 17.2% of those age 65 or over.

== Communities and locations in German ==
- East German – A former community in the southeastern part of the town.
- German ("German Four Corners") – A hamlet by the western town line at the intersection of County Roads 2 and 5.
- German Five Corners – A location north of German village on County Road 2.
