= North Norwich, New York =

- Town

- Location within New York Location within the United States
- Coordinates: 42°36′33″N 75°30′29″W
- Country: United States
- State: New York
- County: Chenango

Government
  - Type: Town Council
  - Town Supervisor: Richard B. Decker (R)
  - Town Council: Members' List: • Linda K. Seymour (R); • Penny M. Fitzpatrick (R); • Timothy Jeffrey (R); • Robert E. Wansor (R)

Area
  - Total: 28.24 sq mi (73.15 km^{2})
  - Land: 28.14 sq mi (72.89 km^{2})
  - Water: 0.10 sq mi (0.27 km^{2})
- Elevation: 1,512 ft (461 m)

Population (2010)
  - Total: 1,783
  - Estimate (2016): 1,733
  - Density: 61.6/sq mi (23.78/km^{2})
- Time zone: UTC-5 (Eastern (EST))
  - Summer (DST): UTC-4 (EDT)
- ZIP Codes: 13814 (North Norwich); 13815 (Norwich); 13460 (Sherburne); 13464 (Smyrna)
- Area code: 607
- FIPS code: 36-017-53297
- GNIS feature ID: 0979291

North Norwich is a town in Chenango County, New York, United States. The population was 1,783 at the 2010 census. The town is directly north of the City of Norwich in the eastern half of the county.

== History ==
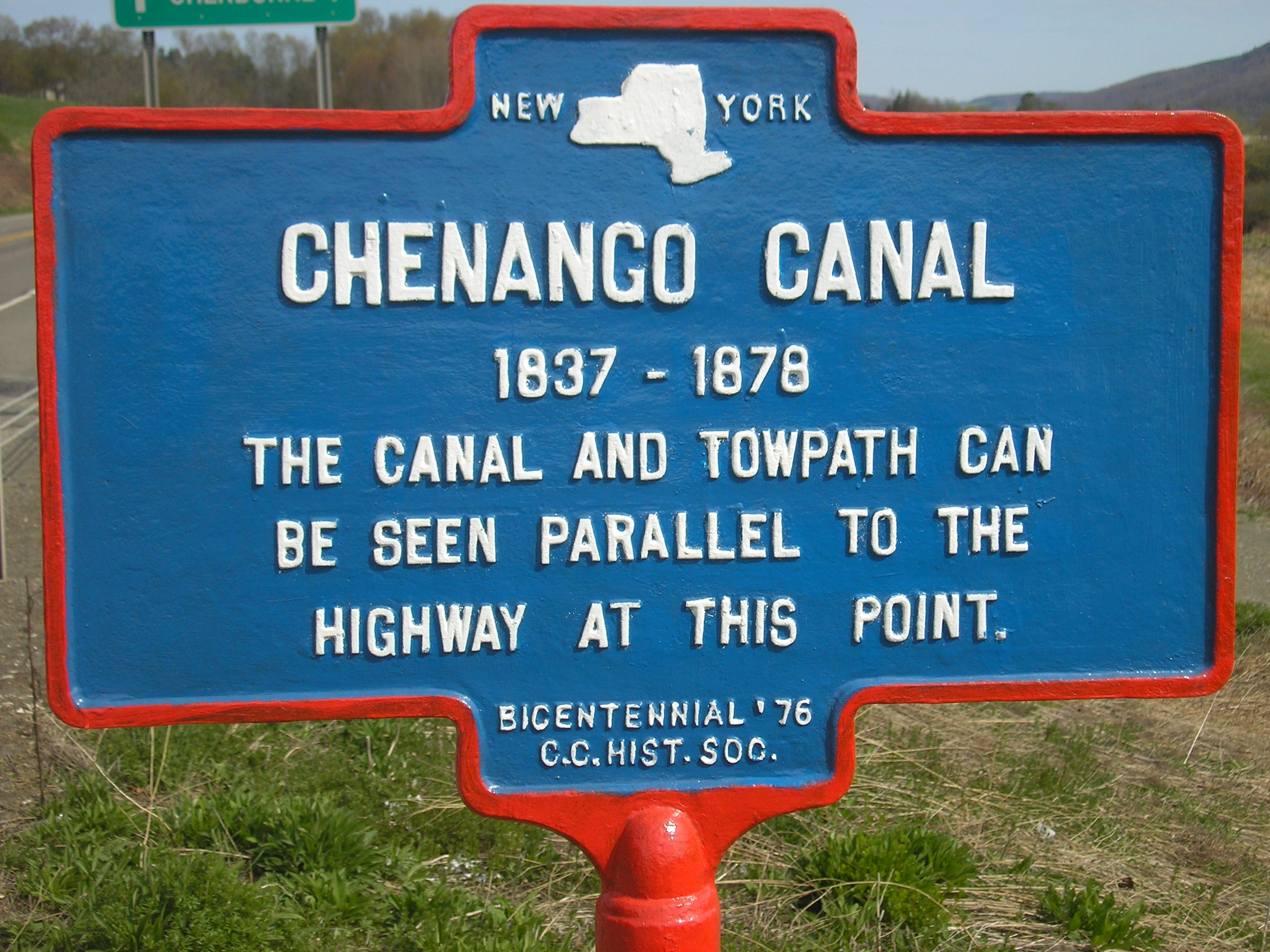
Historic marker of the Chenango Canal, canal and towpath at North Norwich

The first settlement began circa 1794. The town of North Norwich was established in 1849 from the northern part of the town of Norwich.

The former Chenango Canal passed through the town.

== Geography ==
According to the United States Census Bureau, the town has a total area of 28.3 square miles (73.2 km^{2}), of which 28.1 square miles (72.9 km^{2}) is land and 0.12 square miles (0.3 km^{2}), or 0.36%, is water.

New York State Route 12 (north-south) is a major highway through the town. New York State Route 320 is a short highway near the southern town line.

The Chenango River, a tributary of the Susquehanna River, flows southward through the town.

== Demographics ==
Historical population
Census	Pop.	Note	%±
1850	1,172		—
1860	1,171		−0.1%
1870	1,075		−8.2%
1880	964		−10.3%
1890	858		−11.0%
1900	801		−6.6%
1910	691		−13.7%
1920	619		−10.4%
1930	689		11.3%
1940	770		11.8%
1950	875		13.6%
1960	1,096		25.3%
1970	1,579		44.1%
1980	1,687		6.8%
1990	1,998		18.4%
2000	1,966		−1.6%
2010	1,783		−9.3%
2016 (est.)	1,733		−2.8%
U.S. Decennial Census

As of the census of 2000, there were 1,966 people, 727 households, and 532 families residing in the town. The population density was 69.7 inhabitants per square mile (26.9/km^{2}). There were 797 housing units at an average density of 28.2 per square mile (10.9/km^{2}). The racial makeup of the town was 98.42% White, 0.51% African American, 0.05% Native American, 0.51% Asian, 0.05% Pacific Islander, 0.05% from other races, and 0.41% from two or more races. Hispanic or Latino of any race were 0.51% of the population.

There were 727 households, out of which 35.5% had children under the age of 18 living with them, 58.6% were married couples living together, 9.2% had a female householder with no husband present, and 26.8% were non-families. 19.5% of all households were made up of individuals, and 8.9% had someone living alone who was 65 years of age or older. The average household size was 2.70 and the average family size was 3.06.

In the town, the population was spread out, with 28.1% under the age of 18, 6.6% from 18 to 24, 29.0% from 25 to 44, 24.9% from 45 to 64, and 11.3% who were 65 years of age or older. The median age was 36 years. For every 100 females, there were 96.2 males. For every 100 females age 18 and over, there were 95.7 males.

The median income for a household in the town was $37,450, and the median income for a family was $42,414. Males had a median income of $30,605 versus $22,109 for females. The per capita income for the town was $17,022. About 12.0% of families and 16.1% of the population were below the poverty line, including 19.5% of those under age 18 and 10.0% of those age 65 or over.

== Communities and locations in North Norwich ==
- Burwell Corners – A location by the eastern town line on County Road 29.
- Lt. Warren Eaton Airport (OIC) – An airport by the southern town line that services the city of Norwich and the surrounding area.
- Galena – A hamlet southwest of North Norwich village.
- Kings Settlement – A hamlet in the southeastern part of the town on County Road 29.
- North Norwich – The hamlet of North Norwich is located on NY-12.
- Plasterville – A hamlet south of North Norwich village on County Road 32.
- Sherburne Four Corners – A hamlet at the northwestern corner of the town on County Road 20.
- Steam Sawmill Hill – A prominent hill by the northern town line.
