= Preston, New York =

- Town
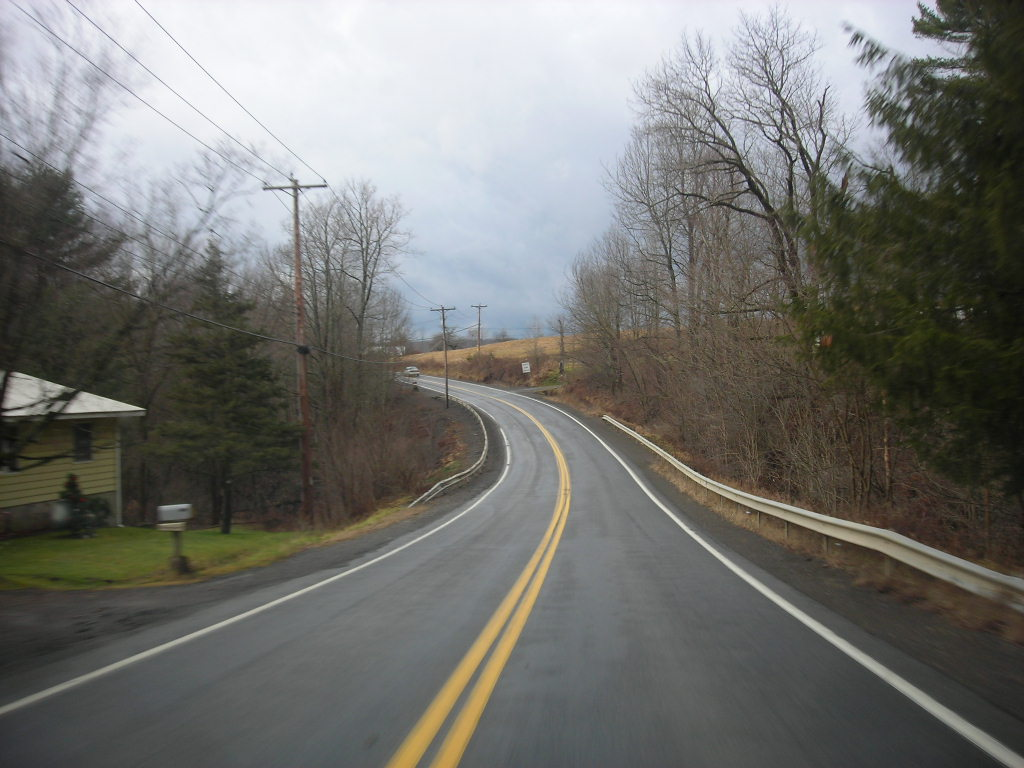
- Chenango CR 10A, former NYS Route 319 in Preston

- Location within the state of New York
- Coordinates: 42°30′51″N 75°36′55″W
- Country: United States
- State: New York
- County: Chenango

Government
  - Type: Town Council
  - Town Supervisor: Zachary Meseck (I)
  - Town Council: Members' List: • Patricia M. Wakefield (R); • David L. Dunckel (R); • V. Peter Mason (D); • Jonathan D. Dunckel (R)

Area
  - Total: 35.05 sq mi (90.77 km^{2})
  - Land: 34.88 sq mi (90.33 km^{2})
  - Water: 0.17 sq mi (0.44 km^{2})
- Elevation: 1,358 ft (414 m)

Population (2010)
  - Total: 1,044
  - Estimate (2019): 984
  - Density: 28.9/sq mi (11.15/km^{2})
- Time zone: UTC-5 (Eastern (EST))
  - Summer (DST): UTC-4 (EDT)
- ZIP Codes: 13830 (Oxford); 13815 (Norwich)
- Area code: 607
- FIPS code: 36-017-59817
- GNIS feature ID: 0979398
- Website: townofpreston.wixsite.com/website

Preston is a town in Chenango County, New York, United States. The population was 1,044 at the 2010 census. Preston is an interior town of Chenango County and is west of the city of Norwich.

== History ==
The first settler arrived circa 1787. The town was formed from the town of Norwich in 1806, but some of Preston was relinquished to Norwich in 1808. In 1816, part of Preston was used to form the new town of McDonough. In 1820, another section of Norwich was added to Preston.

In the year 1865, the population of the town was 982.

The botanist Frederick Vernon Coville (1867–1937), author of Botany of the Death Valley Expedition, was born in Preston.

== Geography ==
According to the United States Census Bureau, the town has a total area of 35.1 square miles (90.8 km^{2}), of which 34.9 square miles (90.3 km^{2}) is land and 0.15 square miles (0.4 km^{2}), or 0.49%, is water.

== Demographics ==
Historical population
Census	Pop.	Note	%±
1820	1,092		—
1830	1,213		11.1%
1840	1,117		−7.9%
1850	1,082		−3.1%
1860	1,013		−6.4%
1870	957		−5.5%
1880	909		−5.0%
1890	762		−16.2%
1900	602		−21.0%
1910	649		7.8%
1920	618		−4.8%
1930	579		−6.3%
1940	672		16.1%
1950	676		0.6%
1960	753		11.4%
1970	714		−5.2%
1980	941		31.8%
1990	1,100		16.9%
2000	928		−15.6%
2010	1,044		12.5%
2019 (est.)	984		−5.7%
U.S. Decennial Census

As of the census of 2000, there were 928 people, 344 households, and 243 families residing in the town. The population density was 26.6 inhabitants per square mile (10.3/km^{2}). There were 426 housing units at an average density of 12.2 per square mile (4.7/km^{2}). The racial makeup of the town was 97.74% White, 0.86% African American, 0.22% Native American, 0.32% Asian, 0.32% from other races, and 0.54% from two or more races. Hispanic or Latino of any race were 0.54% of the population.

There were 344 households, out of which 34.0% had children under the age of 18 living with them, 57.3% were married couples living together, 7.6% had a female householder with no husband present, and 29.1% were non-families. 22.4% of all households were made up of individuals, and 6.7% had someone living alone who was 65 years of age or older. The average household size was 2.59 and the average family size was 2.94.

In the town, the population was spread out, with 25.3% under the age of 18, 7.2% from 18 to 24, 27.8% from 25 to 44, 26.2% from 45 to 64, and 13.5% who were 65 years of age or older. The median age was 39 years. For every 100 females, there were 109.5 males. For every 100 females age 18 and over, there were 106.9 males.

The median income for a household in the town was $32,431, and the median income for a family was $37,917. Males had a median income of $26,985 versus $19,200 for females. The per capita income for the town was $14,760. About 5.6% of families and 11.5% of the population were below the poverty line, including 9.1% of those under age 18 and 9.6% of those age 65 or over.

== Communities and locations in Preston ==
- Fly Meadow Creek – A stream flowing southeast through the town to the Chenango River.
- Nortons Corners – A location in the southwestern part of the town.
- Preston – The hamlet of Preston is located at the junction of County Roads 4,10, 10A, and 19, and Fly Meadow Creek.
- Preston Center – A hamlet southeast of Preston village on County Road 4.
- Steer Pond – A small lake by the western town line.
