= Norwich (town), New York =

Norwich, New York
- Town
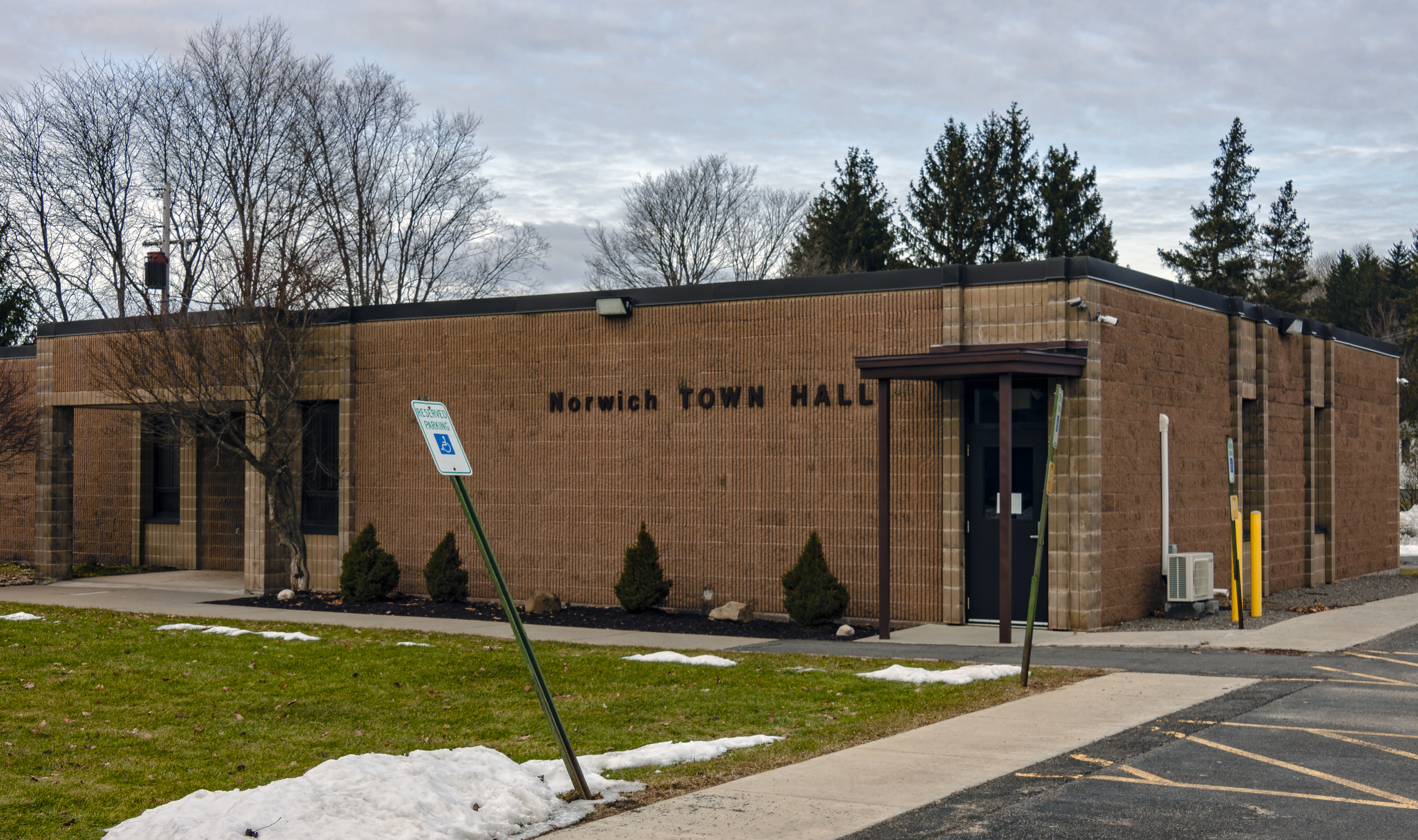
- Town Hall

- Location in Chenango County and the state of New York
- Coordinates: 42°30′49″N 75°29′35″W
- Country: United States
- State: New York
- County: Chenango

Government
  - Type: Town Council
  - Town Supervisor: David C. Law (R)
  - Town Council: Members' List: • Charles W. Brooks (R); • William Evans (R); • Milton H. Shepler (R); • Stanley Foulds (R)

Area
  - Total: 42.04 sq mi (108.88 km^{2})
  - Land: 41.96 sq mi (108.68 km^{2})
  - Water: 0.073 sq mi (0.19 km^{2})
- Elevation: 1,467 ft (447 m)

Population (2010)
  - Total: 3,998
  - Estimate (2016): 3,786
  - Density: 90.2/sq mi (34.83/km^{2})
- Time zone: UTC-5 (Eastern (EST))
  - Summer (DST): UTC-4 (EDT)
- ZIP Codes: 13815 (Norwich); 13830 (Oxford)
- Area code: 607
- FIPS code: 36-53990
- GNIS feature ID: 0979297
- Website: townofnorwichny.gov

Norwich is a town in Chenango County, New York, United States. The population was 3,998 at the 2010 census.

The Town of Norwich is located east of the center of the county. The city of Norwich is surrounded on all sides by the northern part of the town.

== History ==
The first settlers arrived c. 1788. The town of Norwich was formed in 1793 from the towns of Union (now in Broome County) and Bainbridge. As a "mother town", it would go on to lose a significant amount of territory as new towns were formed. In 1806, Norwich gave up territory to form the towns of Pharsalia, Plymouth and Preston. More of Norwich was lost in 1807 to form part of the towns of New Berlin and Columbus. In 1808 and 1820, Norwich exchanged territory with the town of Preston.

In 1816, the hamlet of Norwich incorporated as a village within the town, later reincorporating as the city of Norwich, now completely separate from the town.

== Geography ==
According to the United States Census Bureau, the town of Norwich has a total area of 42.0 square miles (108.9 km^{2}), of which 42.0 square miles (108.7 km^{2}) is land and 0.08 square miles (0.2 km^{2}), or 0.18%, is water.

The Chenango River, a tributary of the Susquehanna River, flows southward through the town. The Unadilla River, also a south-flowing tributary of the Susquehanna, forms part of the eastern boundary of the town.

New York State Route 12, a north-south highway, intersects New York State Route 23, an east-west highway, in the city of Norwich.

== Demographics ==
Historical population
Census	Pop.	Note	%±
1820	3,257		—
1830	3,774		15.9%
1840	4,145		9.8%
1850	3,615		−12.8%
1860	4,356		20.5%
1870	5,601		28.6%
1880	5,756		2.8%
1890	6,524		13.3%
1900	7,004		7.4%
1910	1,138		−83.8%
1920	1,063		−6.6%
1930	1,131		6.4%
1940	1,296		14.6%
1950	1,738		34.1%
1960	2,587		48.8%
1970	3,221		24.5%
1980	4,042		25.5%
1990	4,084		1.0%
2000	3,836		−6.1%
2010	3,998		4.2%
2016 (est.)	3,786		−5.3%
U.S. Decennial Census

As of the census of 2000, there were 3,836 people, 1,521 households, and 1,110 families residing in the town. The population density was 91.2 inhabitants per square mile (35.2/km^{2}). There were 1,706 housing units at an average density of 40.6 per square mile (15.7/km^{2}). The racial makeup of the town was 97.42% White, 0.50% Black or African American, 0.44% Native American, 0.50% Asian, 0.36% from other races, and 0.78% from two or more races. Hispanic or Latino of any race were 1.41% of the population.

There were 1,521 households, out of which 33.0% had children under the age of 18 living with them, 58.5% were married couples living together, 9.7% had a female householder with no husband present, and 27.0% were non-families. 20.6% of all households were made up of individuals, and 8.7% had someone living alone who was 65 years of age or older. The average household size was 2.52 and the average family size was 2.88.

In the town, the population was spread out, with 25.5% under the age of 18, 5.9% from 18 to 24, 27.7% from 25 to 44, 26.7% from 45 to 64, and 14.2% who were 65 years of age or older. The median age was 40 years. For every 100 females, there were 93.2 males. For every 100 females age 18 and over, there were 93.4 males.

The median income for a household in the town was $35,357, and the median income for a family was $42,763. Males had a median income of $32,988 versus $22,817 for females. The per capita income for the town was $18,474. About 8.0% of families and 13.1% of the population were below the poverty line, including 18.6% of those under age 18 and 13.4% of those age 65 or over.

== Communities and locations ==
- Hawley Corners – A hamlet east of the city of Norwich on NY-23.
- Haynes – A hamlet in the southwestern corner of the town.
- North Guilford Corners – A location at the southern town line, south of Webb Corners.
- Polkville – A hamlet southeast of the city of Norwich on County Road 33.
- Springvale – A hamlet east of the city of Norwich, located on County Road 34.
- Webb Corners – A location in the southern part of the town.
- White Store – A location in the southeastern corner of the town on Route 8.
- Woods Corners – A hamlet directly north of the city of Norwich on NY-12 and adjacent to the northern town line.
