= Chenango County, New York =

County in New York, United States

- County
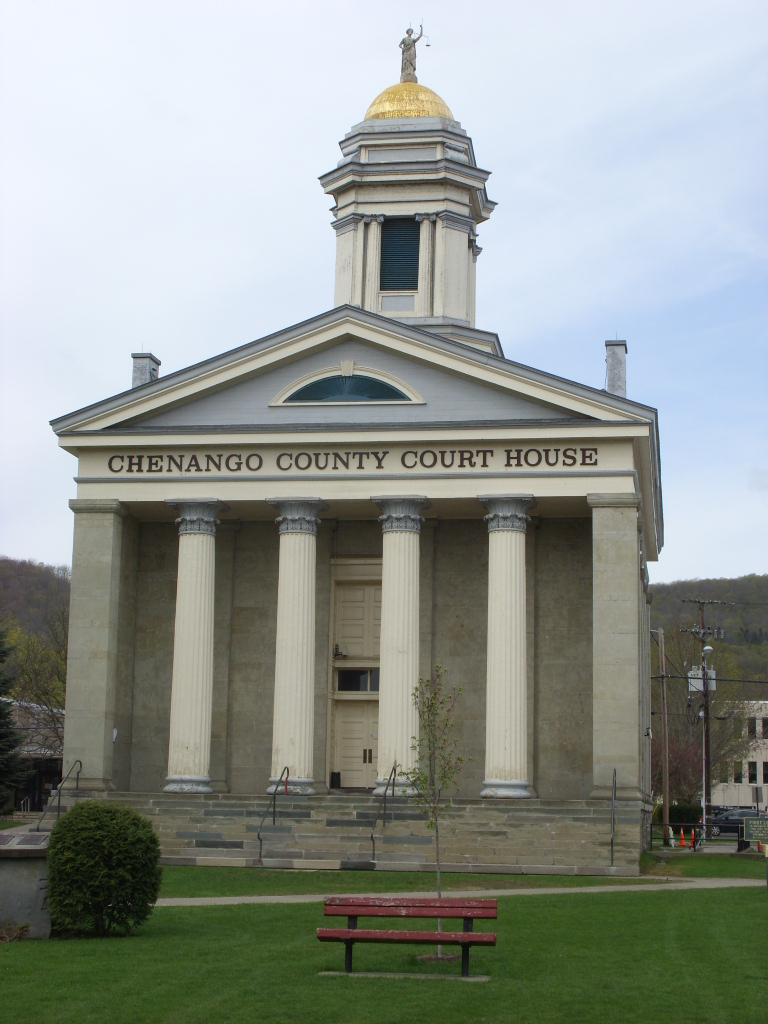
- Chenango County Courthouse

- Flag Seal

- Location within the U.S. state of New York
- Coordinates: 42°30′N 75°37′W
- Country: United States
- State: New York
- Founded: March 15, 1798
- Named for: Onondaga word for bull thistle
- Seat: Norwich
- Largest city: Norwich

Area
  - Total: 899 sq mi (2,330 km^{2})
  - Land: 894 sq mi (2,320 km^{2})
  - Water: 5.1 sq mi (13 km^{2}) 0.6%

Population (2020)
  - Total: 47,220
  - Estimate (2025): 45,715 ▼
  - Density: 52.8/sq mi (20.4/km^{2})
- Time zone: UTC−5 (Eastern)
  - Summer (DST): UTC−4 (EDT)
- Congressional district: 19th
- Website: www.chenangocountyny.gov

Chenango County is a county located in the south-central section of the U.S. state of New York. As of the 2020 census, the population was 47,220. Its county seat is Norwich. The county's name originates from an Oneida word meaning 'large bull-thistle'. The county is part of the Southern Tier region of the state.

== History ==
This was long the territory of the Oneida people, one of the first Five Nations of the Iroquois Confederacy or Haudenosaunee. They occupied the area until after the Revolutionary War, when they were forced off the land, although they had been allies of the patriot colonists. They were granted a small reservation, which settlers continued to encroach on.

When English colonists organized counties in 1683 in what is now New York, the present Chenango County was part of Albany County. This was an enormous county, including the northern part of New York State as well as all of the present State of Vermont and, in theory, extending westward to the Pacific Ocean. However, territories located to the west of present-day Pennsylvania were under effective French control as part of New France. Albany County was reduced in size on July 3, 1766, by the creation of Cumberland County, and further on March 16, 1770, by the creation of Gloucester County, both containing territory now in Vermont.

On March 12, 1772, what was left of Albany County was split into three parts, one remaining under the name Albany County. One of the other pieces, Tryon County, contained the western portion (and thus, since no western boundary was specified, theoretically still extended west to the Pacific). The eastern boundary of Tryon County was approximately five miles west of the present city of Schenectady, and the county included the western part of the Adirondack Mountains and the area west of the West Branch of the Delaware River. The area then designated as Tryon County has since been organized as 37 counties of New York State. The county was named for William Tryon, the British colonial governor of New York.

In the years prior to 1776, during the increasing tensions most of the Loyalists in Tryon County fled to Fort Niagara on the Western Frontier. In 1784, following the peace treaty that ended the American Revolutionary War, the Americans renamed Tryon County as Montgomery County in honor of the US general Richard Montgomery. He had captured several places in Canada and died attempting to capture the city of Quebec. The US residents replaced the name of the former British governor.

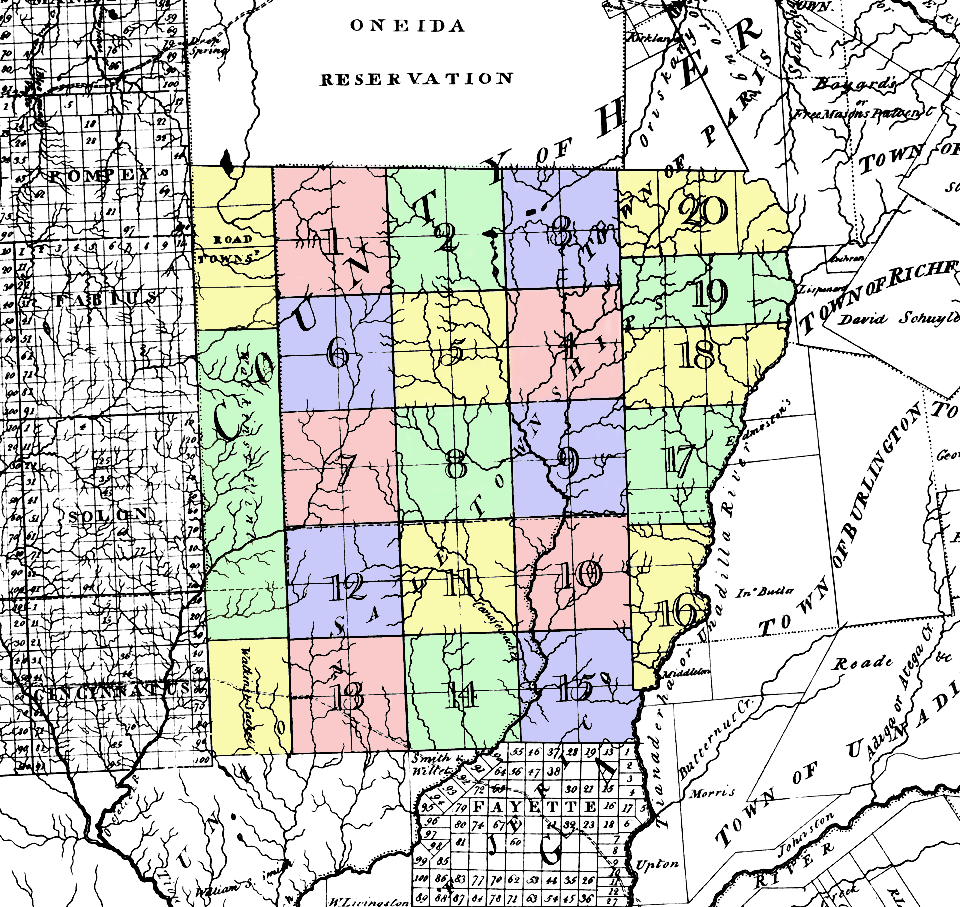
The "Twenty Townships" west of the Unadilla River, conveyed by the Oneida Indians in 1788 and known as "Clinton's Purchase"

In 1788, the Oneida Reservation was considerably reduced by what is known as Clinton's Purchase, when land was sold off west of the Unadilla River to create what are now 20 towns. (See map to the right.) Settlers from eastern New York and New England entered the area and began farming.

In 1789, Montgomery County was reduced in size by the splitting-off of Ontario County. The area split off from Montgomery County was much larger than the present Ontario County, as it included the present Allegany, Cattaraugus, Chautauqua, Erie, Genesee, Livingston, Monroe, Niagara, Orleans, Steuben, Wyoming, Yates, and part of Schuyler and Wayne counties. It was the practice to establish a large geographic county and divide it as settlement increased.

In 1791, Herkimer, Otsego and Tioga counties were organized from land separated from Montgomery County.

Chenango County was formed on March 15, 1798, from 1,610 square miles (4,170 km^{2}) of Tioga and Herkimer counties. Its eastern border is formed by the Unadilla River. The land had been purchased the previous year from the Oneida, who were forced into a smaller reservation to the north.

On April 4, 1804, 70 square miles (180 km^{2}) of Chenango County was partitioned to expand Oneida County; the communities of Waterville and Sangerfield were assigned to the new Oneida County.

On March 21, 1806, 650 square miles (1,680 km^{2}) of Chenango County was partitioned to produce Madison County. This established the current borders of Chenango County, which have been maintained to the early 21st century. This area was developed for agriculture in the nineteenth century and is still largely rural.

== Geography ==
According to the U.S. Census Bureau, the county has a total area of 899 square miles (2,330 km^{2}), of which 894 square miles (2,320 km^{2}) is land and 5.1 square miles (13 km^{2}) (0.6%) is water.

Chenango County is in the approximate center of the state, located west of Albany, north of Binghamton, and southeast of Syracuse. The county is considered to be in the Southern Tier region of New York State.

The Chenango River, a tributary of the Susquehanna River, flows southward through the county.

=== Adjacent counties ===
- Madison County - north
- Otsego County - northeast
- Delaware County - southeast
- Broome County - south
- Cortland County - west

== Demographics ==
Historical population
Census	Pop.	Note	%±
1800	15,666		—
1810	21,704		38.5%
1820	31,215		43.8%
1830	37,238		19.3%
1840	40,785		9.5%
1850	40,311		−1.2%
1860	40,934		1.5%
1870	40,564		−0.9%
1880	39,891		−1.7%
1890	37,776		−5.3%
1900	36,568		−3.2%
1910	35,575		−2.7%
1920	34,969		−1.7%
1930	34,665		−0.9%
1940	36,454		5.2%
1950	39,138		7.4%
1960	43,243		10.5%
1970	46,368		7.2%
1980	49,344		6.4%
1990	51,768		4.9%
2000	51,401		−0.7%
2010	50,477		−1.8%
2020	47,220		−6.5%
2025 (est.)	45,715	▼	−3.2%
U.S. Decennial Census; 1790-1960 1900-1990; 1990-2000 2010-2020

=== 2020 census ===
Chenango County, New York – Racial and ethnic composition Note: the US Census treats Hispanic/Latino as an ethnic category. This table excludes Latinos from the racial categories and assigns them to a separate category. Hispanics/Latinos may be of any race.
Race / Ethnicity (NH = Non-Hispanic)	Pop 1980	Pop 1990	Pop 2000	Pop 2010	Pop 2020	% 1980	% 1990	% 2000	% 2010	% 2020
White alone (NH)	48,624	50,615	49,815	48,265	43,153	98.54%	97.77%	96.91%	95.62%	91.39%
Black or African American alone (NH)	235	354	403	323	345	0.48%	0.68%	0.78%	0.64%	0.73%
Native American or Alaska Native alone (NH)	66	143	138	151	93	0.13%	0.28%	0.27%	0.30%	0.20%
Asian alone (NH)	139	160	144	200	236	0.28%	0.31%	0.28%	0.40%	0.50%
Native Hawaiian or Pacific Islander alone (NH)	x	x	10	4	15	x	x	0.02%	0.01%	0.03%
Other race alone (NH)	33	20	15	30	109	0.07%	0.04%	0.03%	0.06%	0.23%
Mixed race or Multiracial (NH)	x	x	328	575	2,152	x	x	0.64%	1.14%	4.56%
Hispanic or Latino (any race)	247	476	548	929	1,117	0.50%	0.92%	1.07%	1.84%	2.37%
Total	49,344	51,768	51,401	50,477	47,220	100.00%	100.00%	100.00%	100.00%	100.00%

=== 2000 Census ===
As of the census of 2000, there were 51,401 people, 19,926 households, and 13,549 families residing in the county. The population density was 58 people per square mile (22 people/km^{2}). There were 23,890 housing units at an average density of 27 per square mile (10/km^{2}). The racial makeup of the county was 97.65% White, 0.82% Black or African American, 0.27% Native American, 0.28% Asian, 0.02% Pacific Islander, 0.22% from other races, and 0.74% from two or more races. 1.07% of the population were Hispanic or Latino of any race. 20.2% were of English, 14.5% German, 13.8% Irish, 12.3% American and 8.9% Italian ancestry according to Census 2000. 96.7% spoke English and 1.3% Spanish as their first language.

There were 19,926 households, out of which 32.50% had children under the age of 18 living with them, 53.10% were married couples living together, 9.80% had a female householder with no husband present, and 32.00% were non-families. 26.10% of all households were made up of individuals, and 11.40% had someone living alone who was 65 years of age or older. The average household size was 2.52 and the average family size was 3.01.

In the county, the population was spread out, with 26.20% under the age of 18, 7.00% from 18 to 24, 27.50% from 25 to 44, 24.40% from 45 to 64, and 14.90% who were 65 years of age or older. The median age was 38 years. For every 100 females there were 97.00 males. For every 100 females age 18 and over, there were 94.70 males.

The median income for a household in the county was $33,679, and the median income for a family was $39,711. Males had a median income of $30,363 versus $22,429 for females. The per capita income for the county was $16,427. About 10.70% of families and 14.40% of the population were below the poverty line, including 19.50% of those under age 18 and 8.70% of those age 65 or over.

== Government ==
United States presidential election results for Chenango County, New York
Year	Republican		Democratic		Third party(ies)	
Year	No.	%	No.	%	No.	%
1884	5,462	50.99%	4,410	41.17%	840	7.84%
1888	5,798	52.49%	4,640	42.01%	608	5.50%
1892	5,378	51.04%	4,273	40.56%	885	8.40%
1896	6,338	59.09%	3,973	37.04%	415	3.87%
1900	6,362	58.89%	4,043	37.42%	398	3.68%
1904	6,394	59.77%	3,817	35.68%	486	4.54%
1908	5,949	57.52%	3,772	36.47%	621	6.00%
1912	4,043	42.71%	3,341	35.29%	2,082	21.99%
1916	5,198	54.77%	3,887	40.96%	405	4.27%
1920	10,116	71.12%	3,735	26.26%	373	2.62%
1924	11,323	72.60%	3,392	21.75%	881	5.65%
1928	13,955	77.21%	3,986	22.05%	132	0.73%
1932	11,566	65.27%	5,953	33.60%	200	1.13%
1936	13,772	72.50%	5,143	27.08%	80	0.42%
1940	14,168	72.84%	5,241	26.94%	43	0.22%
1944	12,745	71.69%	4,997	28.11%	37	0.21%
1948	11,988	70.59%	4,764	28.05%	230	1.35%
1952	16,062	79.66%	4,089	20.28%	13	0.06%
1956	16,314	81.09%	3,804	18.91%	0	0.00%
1960	14,533	71.93%	5,659	28.01%	12	0.06%
1964	7,293	38.48%	11,653	61.49%	6	0.03%
1968	11,785	63.86%	5,706	30.92%	964	5.22%
1972	13,770	70.58%	5,695	29.19%	44	0.23%
1976	12,384	62.43%	7,356	37.08%	97	0.49%
1980	10,400	53.08%	6,917	35.31%	2,275	11.61%
1984	14,254	69.03%	6,343	30.72%	51	0.25%
1988	11,727	58.92%	8,021	40.30%	154	0.77%
1992	8,114	37.24%	8,017	36.80%	5,656	25.96%
1996	7,319	37.96%	8,797	45.63%	3,163	16.41%
2000	10,033	49.55%	9,112	45.00%	1,105	5.46%
2004	11,582	54.27%	9,277	43.47%	482	2.26%
2008	10,337	49.59%	10,100	48.45%	410	1.97%
2012	9,713	50.29%	9,116	47.20%	485	2.51%
2016	11,921	59.13%	6,775	33.61%	1,464	7.26%
2020	13,496	60.38%	8,300	37.14%	554	2.48%
2024	14,294	63.09%	8,177	36.09%	184	0.81%

Chenango County has a Board of Supervisors that consists of 23 Town/City elected officials, serving as representatives at the County level. The term for each Supervisor is based on the term set by each particular Town. A Supervisor holds office for either two or four years.

In 21st-century United States politics, Chenango County is considered to be a Republican-leaning county, where the majority of voters elect national Republican candidates. In 2004, Republican George Bush won by an 11% margin over Democrat John Kerry. For state and congressional offices, voters sometimes elect Democratic candidates. In 2006 both Eliot Spitzer and Hillary Clinton carried it, winning 57% and 54% of the vote for governor and US Senator, respectively. In 2008, John McCain carried Chenango County over Barack Obama in the presidential election by a close margin of 49.59%-48.45% or a difference of 237 votes. In 2010, Democrat Andrew Cuomo for governor, and Democrats Chuck Schumer and Kirsten Gillibrand for the US Senate each carried it. In 2012, Republican Mitt Romney narrowly won the county over Obama, but like most of the Upstate, swung sharply towards the Republicans in 2016 and 2020, with Donald Trump receiving over 60% of the vote in 2020 making him the first Republican to do so since 1984.

== Education ==
Morrisville State College has a branch in Norwich, while Oxford, New York has its school district, along with Norwich, New York, Greene, New York, and Bainbridge, New York.

== Communities ==
=== Larger Settlements ===
#	Location	Population	Type
1	Norwich†	7,051	City
2	Greene	1,463	Village
3	Sherburne	1,360	Village
4	Oxford	1,330	Village
5	Bainbridge	1,251	Village
6	New Berlin	901	Village
7	Afton	794	Village
8	Earlville	774	Village
9	Guilford	322	CDP
10	Smithville Flats	303	CDP
11	Smyrna	197	Village

† - County seat

=== Towns ===
In New York, a "town" is a political subdivision (synonymous with township). The towns in northern Chenango County originated from the Twenty Townships ceded by the Oneida tribe to the State of New York.

- Afton
- Bainbridge
- Columbus
- Coventry
- German
- Greene
- Guilford
- Lincklaen
- McDonough
- New Berlin
- North Norwich
- Norwich
- Otselic
- Oxford
- Pharsalia
- Pitcher
- Plymouth
- Preston
- Sherburne
- Smithville
- Smyrna

=== Hamlets ===
- Holmesville
- Mount Upton
- Rockdale
- South Plymouth

== Notable people ==
- Allen Aaron Cook, an architect, was born here in 1832
- Nancy Matthews Elliott was born here in 1810 and became the mother of Thomas Edison.
- Serranus Clinton Hastings, U.S. Congressman and founder of the University of California College of the Law, San Francisco

== See also ==
- List of counties in New York
- National Register of Historic Places listings in Chenango County, New York
