= Unadilla =

Unadilla may refer to:

== Places in the United States ==
Settled places:

- Unadilla, Georgia, city in Dooly County
- Unadilla, Nebraska, village in Otoe County
- In Otsego County, New York:
  - Unadilla, New York, town
  - Unadilla (village), New York, in the eponymous town
  - Unadilla Forks, New York, a hamlet
- Unadilla Township, Michigan, in Livingston County

Other geographical features:

- Unadilla River, in New York state
- Unadilla, California, former settlement in Kern County

== Other uses ==
- Unadilla (moth), a genus of snout moths in subfamily Phycitinae
