= Brookfield, New York =

- Town
- Location within New York Location within the United States
- Coordinates: 42°48′47″N 75°19′2″W
- Country: United States
- State: New York
- County: Madison

Government
  - Type: Town Council
  - Town Supervisor: Loren Corbin (D)
  - Town Council: Members' List: • Rachael A. Owen (D); • Jefferson L. Mayne (R); • Dewitt C. Head (R); • George Cowen (D)

Area
  - Total: 78.01 sq mi (202.05 km^{2})
  - Land: 77.82 sq mi (201.54 km^{2})
  - Water: 0.20 sq mi (0.51 km^{2})
- Elevation: 1,473 ft (449 m)

Population (2020)
  - Total: 2,247
  - Density: 28.88/sq mi (11.15/km^{2})
- Time zone: UTC-5 (Eastern (EST))
  - Summer (DST): UTC-4 (EDT)
- ZIP codes: 13314 (Brookfield); 13364 (Leonardsville); 13418 (North Brookfield); 13485 (West Edmeston); 13355 (Hubbardsville); 13491 (West Winfield); 13460 (Sherburne)
- Area code: 315
- FIPS code: 36-053-08587
- GNIS feature ID: 0978757
- Website: brookfieldny.weebly.com

Brookfield is a town in Madison County, New York, United States. The population was 2,247 at the 2020 census, down from 2,545 in 2010.

The town is located in the southeastern part of Madison County. The county agricultural fair is held here every year.

== Geography ==
The town occupies the southeast corner of Madison County. The northern town line is the border of Oneida County, and the southern town boundary is the border of Chenango County. The eastern town line is the border of Otsego County.

New York State Route 8 runs along the eastern edge of the town, leading north into Bridgewater and south to New Berlin. New York State Route 12 crosses the northwestern part of Brookfield, leading north to Waterville and southwest to Sherburne.

According to the U.S. Census Bureau, the town of Brookfield has a total area of 78.0 square miles (202 km^{2}), of which 77.8 square miles (202 km^{2}) are land and 0.2 square miles (0.5 km^{2}), or 0.25%, water. The Unadilla River forms the eastern border of the town, and the majority of the town is drained by its tributaries, including Beaver Creek, which flows southward through the hamlets of Brookfield and South Brookfield. The Sangerfield River, a tributary of the Chenango River, crosses the northwestern corner of the town, and the western part of the town is drained by tributaries of Handsome Brook, a separate tributary of the Chenango.

== Demographics ==
Historical population
| Census | Pop. | Note | %± |
|---|---|---|---|
| 1820 | 4,240 | | — |
| 1830 | 4,367 | | 3.0% |
| 1840 | 3,695 | | −15.4% |
| 1850 | 3,585 | | −3.0% |
| 1860 | 3,729 | | 4.0% |
| 1870 | 3,565 | | −4.4% |
| 1880 | 3,685 | | 3.4% |
| 1890 | 3,262 | | −11.5% |
| 1900 | 2,726 | | −16.4% |
| 1910 | 2,403 | | −11.8% |
| 1920 | 2,092 | | −12.9% |
| 1930 | 1,750 | | −16.3% |
| 1940 | 1,703 | | −2.7% |
| 1950 | 1,841 | | 8.1% |
| 1960 | 1,990 | | 8.1% |
| 1970 | 2,064 | | 3.7% |
| 1980 | 2,037 | | −1.3% |
| 1990 | 2,225 | | 9.2% |
| 2000 | 2,403 | | 8.0% |
| 2010 | 2,545 | | 5.9% |
| 2020 | 2,247 | | −11.7% |
U.S. Decennial Census

As of the census of 2000, there were 2,403 people, 877 households, and 658 families residing in the town. The population density was 30.8 inhabitants per square mile (11.9/km^{2}). There were 1,041 housing units at an average density of 13.4 per square mile (5.2/km^{2}). The racial makeup of the town was 98.29% White, 0.54% African American, 0.25% Native American, 0.37% Asian, 0.04% from other races, and 0.50% from two or more races. Hispanic or Latino of any race were 0.33% of the population.

There were 877 households, out of which 37.4% had children under the age of 18 living with them, 60.5% were married couples living together, 9.0% had a female householder with no husband present, and 24.9% were non-families. 20.1% of all households were made up of individuals, and 9.1% had someone living alone who was 65 years of age or older. The average household size was 2.74 and the average family size was 3.13.

In the town, the population was spread out, with 28.7% under the age of 18, 8.2% from 18 to 24, 28.7% from 25 to 44, 23.8% from 45 to 64, and 10.7% who were 65 years of age or older. The median age was 35 years. For every 100 females, there were 99.6 males. For every 100 females age 18 and over, there were 99.1 males.

The median income for a household in the town was $31,000 and the median income for a family was $35,000. Males had a median income of $26,462 versus $19,226 for females. The per capita income for the town was $13,719. About 10.4% of families and 13.9% of the population were below the poverty line, including 19.4% of those under age 18 and 5.5% of those age 65 or over.

== Notable people ==
- Myrtilla Miner, educator and abolitionist; born near Brookfield
- John Palmer Usher (1816–1889), Secretary of the Interior under the Lincoln Administration; born in Brookfield
- William R. Williams (1884–1972), US congressman

== Communities and locations in Brookfield ==
- Brookfield – The hamlet of Brookfield is in the eastern part of the town.
- Button Falls – A waterfall located southwest of Leonardsville on Button Creek
- Guideboard – A hamlet west of Brookfield village on Route 80.
- Leonardsville – A hamlet near the eastern town line.
- Marsh Corners – A location in the southwestern part of the town.
- Moscow Hill – A hamlet in the western part of the town on Route 95.
- North Brookfield – A hamlet in the northwestern part of the town.
- River Forks – A location in the northeastern corner of the town.
- South Brookfield – A hamlet in the southeastern corner of the town.
- West Brookfield – A hamlet north of Moscow Hill, near the western town line.
- West Edmeston – A hamlet on the eastern town line, mostly situated in the town of Edmeston.
- Brookfield Speedway – Located on the Madison County Fairgrounds

== Education ==
- Brookfield has one school, the Brookfield Central School, and it instructs grades K-12.
- The Brookfield Central School mascot is the beaver.
- The 1982-1983 Brookfield Central School boys varsity basketball team won the Section III tournament and went on to win the New York State Championship in the Class D division.
