= Shawler Brook =

Location
- Country: United States
- State: New York

Physical characteristics
- Mouth: Center Brook
  - location: New Berlin, New York
  - coordinates: 42°39′42″N 75°21′07″W
  - elevation: 1,166 ft (355 m)
- Basin size: 9.77 mi^{2} (25.3 km^{2})

The Shawler Brook is a small creek that converges with Center Brook in New Berlin, New York. The Center Brook flows into the Unadilla River.
