= Mount Markham (disambiguation) =

Mount Markham is a twin-peaked massif surmounting the north end of Antarctica's Markham Plateau.

Mount Markham may also refer to:

- Mount Markham (New York), near Campbell Brook (Unadilla River tributary), US
- Mount Albert Markham, Churchill Mountains, Antarctica

== See also ==
- Markham (disambiguation)
