= Great Brook (Unadilla River tributary) =

- Location of the mouth of Great Brook

Location
- Country: United States
- State: New York

Physical characteristics
- Source
  - coordinates: 42°39′04″N 75°22′59″W
- Mouth: Unadilla River
  - coordinates: 42°30′41″N 75°23′34″W
  - elevation: 1,040 ft (320 m)

Basin features
- Tributaries
  - right: West Branch Great Brook

Great Brook is a river in Chenango County, New York. It flows into Unadilla River east of Holmesville.
