= Center Brook (Unadilla River tributary) =

Location
- Country: United States
- State: New York
- Municipality: New Berlin, New York

Physical characteristics
- Mouth: Unadilla River
  - location: New Berlin, New York
  - coordinates: 42°38′39″N 75°19′48″W
- Basin size: 22 mi^{2} (57 km^{2})

Basin features
- Tributaries
  - left: Shawler Brook

The Center Brook converges with the Unadilla River in New Berlin, New York. The Center Brook has one main tributary, the Shawler Brook which converges with Center Brook in New Berlin, New York. The Center Brook is part of the Unadilla River watershed.
