= Holmesville, New York =

- Hamlet
- Location within New York Location within the United States
- Coordinates: 42°30′46″N 75°24′05″W
- Country: United States
- State: New York
- County: Chenango
- Town: New Berlin
- Elevation: 1,053 ft (321 m)
- Time zone: UTC-5 (Eastern (EST))
  - Summer (DST): UTC-4 (EDT)
- ZIP Code: 13843 (South New Berlin)
- Area code: 607
- GNIS feature ID: 953022

Holmesville is a hamlet in Chenango County, New York, United States. It is situated on the Unadilla River, in the south-east corner of the town of New Berlin.

== Facilities ==
At one time, a branch of the Midland Rail Road had a station in the village. about a one and one-half miles south of South New Berlin. Slightly over two miles south of the village there was a Union church, (built in 1861). At one time Holmesville was a rather thriving village with a district school, two stores, a grist-mill, a saw, shingle and planing mill, a cheese factory (built in 1861), a cheese factory, two shoe shops (kept by Smith O. Dexter and Harvey Isbell), a blacksmith shop, kept by Watson Woodworth, two wagon shops (kept by Harmon Hopkins and George Sherman), two cabinet shops (kept by Richard Hunt and Horatio G. Littlefair), a cooper shop, kept by John Lamphier, and a population of 168.

== History ==
The first merchant at Holmesville was Waterman Fields, a native of the town, whose father came from Rhode Island among the first settlers and located two miles west of New Berlin. Waterman Fields built his store in 1833, on the site of the store once occupied by Martin A. Burlingame. There was a general store located on the south-east corner of the intersection. The last owner of the store was Herbert Reed. The store was also a post office. Once the store closed, the building continued to be a post office. The last Postmaster was Richard Meade.

Located about a mile west of the village, on Holmesville Hill Road, a congregation built a church in 1826. At that time it was named the "Free Will Baptist Church". That church building was later abandoned as the congregation built a new facility in the village. The new Church was named the Holmesville Baptist Church. The Church used a small school house, located across the main road, for Sunday School classes. By 1968 the church had torn down the old school house and built a new facility, which stands at the present. The former building was sold to AutoMecha - a company that manufactured paper folding machines. After a few years of operation, the AutoMecha building burned to the ground and the owner, a Mr. Brown, sold the vacant property back to the Church for $1.00 with the understanding that the Church would remove the remains of the building.

Abraham Holmes, James Isbell and Zara Arnold opened a store about 1844, in the building now occupied by Charles H. Thornton, which was built for the purpose by Mr. Holmes about that time.

Ira Dibble came from Guilford about thirty years ago and occupied the building vacated by the Isbells. He traded some five years, when he went to New York.

Charles H. Thornton, a native of Holmesville, is now trading here. The only other merchant now trading here is Martin A. Burlingame, who is a native of the place, but came here from New York, and commenced business Feb. 1, 1879.

The post office at Holmesville was established in the fall of 1871, and George Miller was the first postmaster. He was succeeded in the office by, Wallace Sherburne.

The Holmesville flouring and grist-mill is owned by the heirs of Mason White, and operated by Rufus S. Whitenden, who took possession Nov. 12, 1878. It contains three run of stones, which are propelled by water drawn from the Unadilla by means of a ditch a quarter of a mile long and affording a fall of six feet.

The saw, shingle and planing mill now owned by Ira Holmes was built by his father, Abraham Holmes, about sixty years ago, and operated by him till about 1864, when he sold to his son Dennis, who sold in 1873, to his brother Ira, the present proprietor, and Stephen Curtis, the latter of whom sold his interest to his partner some three or four years ago. The grist-mill at this place was built soon after the saw-mill, by Abraham Holmes, and has undergone the same changes in proprietorship till within three or four years. Ira Holmes sold it to Mason White, who operated it till his death, in 1879, since which time it has been in possession of his heirs.

Over the years, Holmesville has hosted many types of businesses and facilities. For many years it was the site of the Holmesville Christian Academy. This academy was a small school for students from K-12 and graduated around 3-5 students per year. The post office building also housed Reed's General Store owned by Postmaster Herb Reed, that sold many varieties of boots and shoes to the local community. Both are gone today and the building is owned by a private owner but the post office boxes are still located in front of the building and are still used by the nearby residents.

The town had a newspaper, "Our Enterprise" from 1884 until an unknown date in the 1800s. The newspaper was created and published by Fred Caton, published weekly and was "Devoted to the welfare of our homes, our country & the church."
