= Deborah Goldsmith =

American painter (1808–1836)

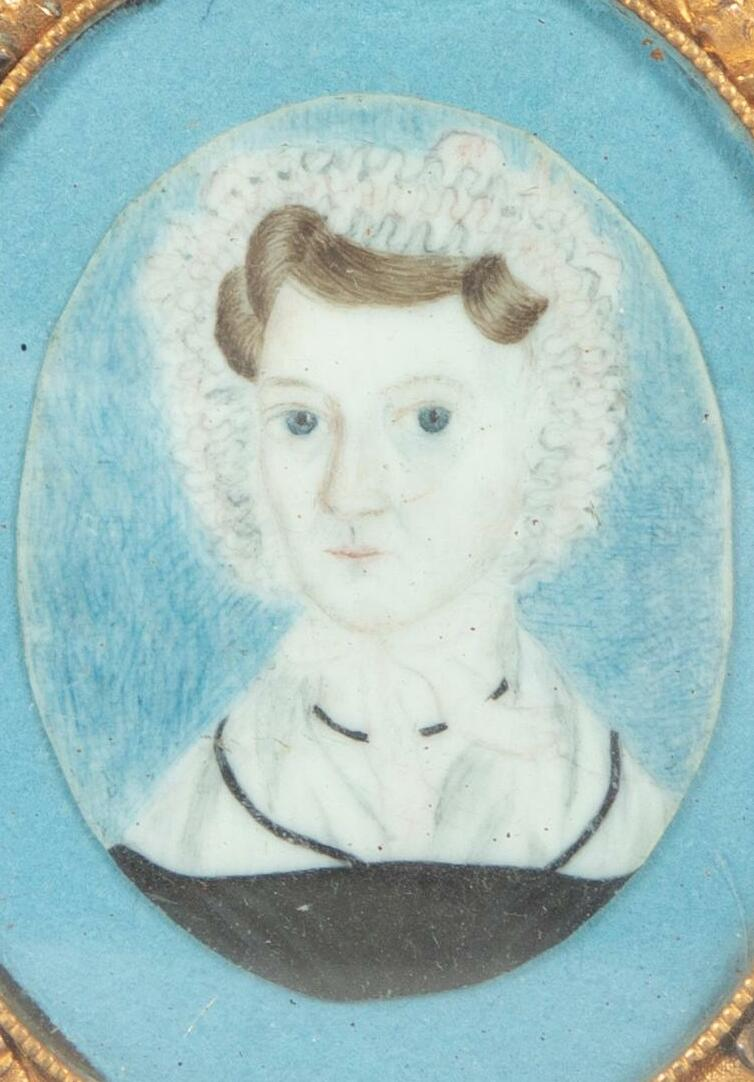
- miniature self-portrait
- Born: August 14, 1808; North Brookfield
- Died: March 16, 1836 (aged 27); Hamilton
- Occupation: Painter, artist

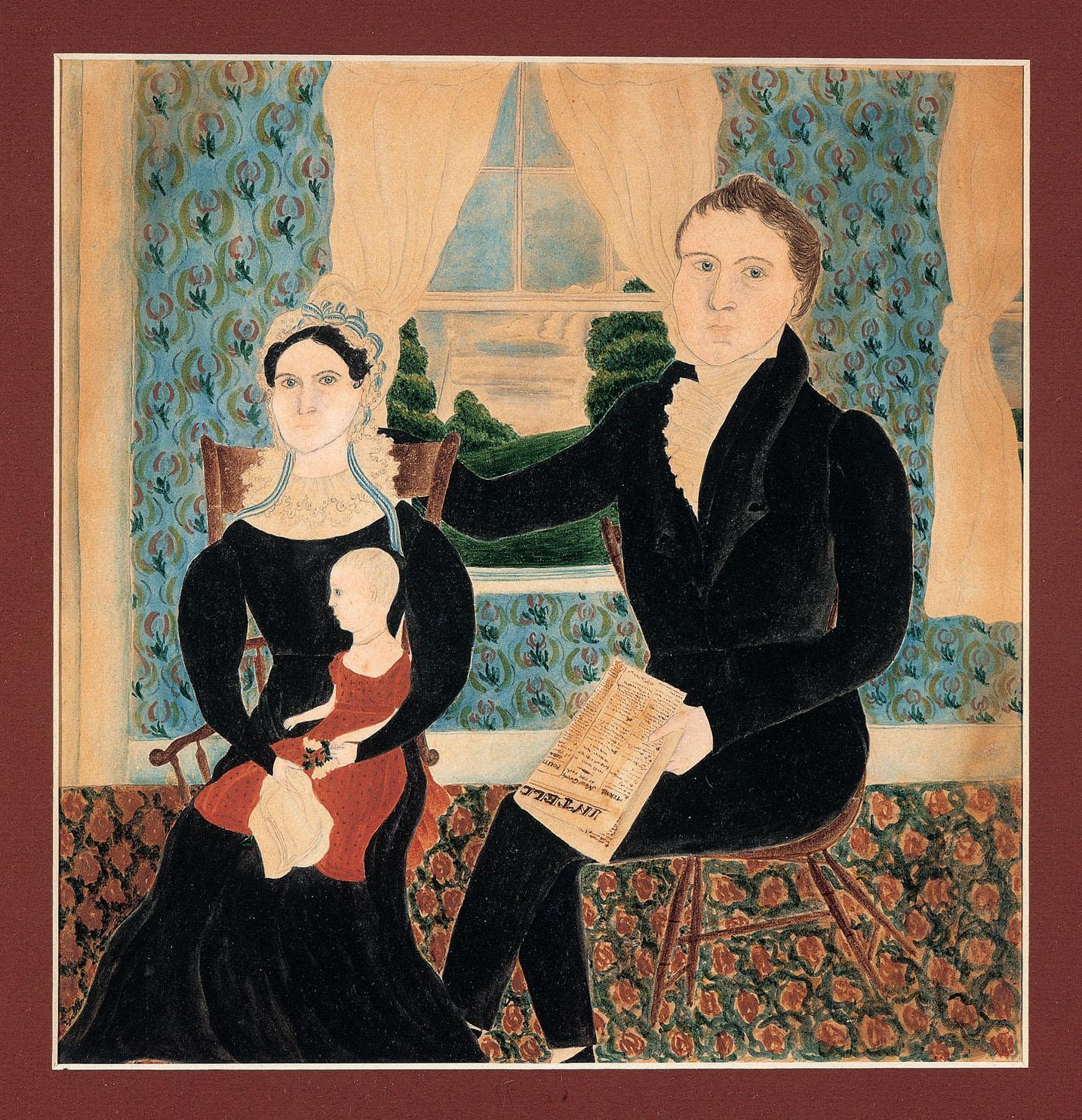
Mr. and Mrs. Lyman Day and Their Daughter Cornelia, watercolor, c. 1823–1824, in the collection of the American Folk Art Museum

Deborah Goldsmith (August 14, 1808 – March 16, 1836) was an American itinerant portraitist.

== Life ==
Goldsmith was a native of North Brookfield, New York, but spent much of her adolescence in the neighboring town of Hamilton, at the home of her sister and brother-in-law, the Boons. She was the daughter of Richard and Ruth Miner Goldsmith, former residents of Guilford, Connecticut, who moved to Brookfield, New York, sometime between 1805 and 1808. Little is known of her life, or of her motivations for becoming an artist, although it is suspected that she was forced into the profession in order to support her parents. Goldsmith has been described as a "self-taught itinerant limner". No advertisements survive documenting her travels; however, her own records indicate that she was active in the New York communities of Brookfield, North Brookfield, Hamilton, Lebanon, Cooperstown, Hartwick, Toddsville, and Hubbardsville between 1826 and 1832. Most of her portraits were created between 1828 and 1832. That year she married George Addison Throop, a member of a family for whom she had produced work; their marriage followed a correspondence in which she expressed concerns about their differing religions (she was a Baptist, he a Universalist), her age (greater by two years), and the fact that some of her teeth were false. The couple had two children before her death, following an illness of several weeks' duration.

A book on the couple's family history, Ancestral charts of George Addison Throop, Deborah Goldsmith, was published in 1934.

== Works ==
Only a handful of works by Goldsmith have been identified, most of them watercolors either on paper or on ivory, although she is known to have produced pictures in oil as well. She produced numerous portraits as well as commonplace books, the latter filled with decorative images, illustrated copies of prints, and a mourning picture in addition to poetry and other writings. She also left behind her worktable and a tin paint box. An 1832 portrait of Permilia Forbes Sweet by Goldsmith is owned by the Fenimore Art Museum, while her portrait of Mr. and Mrs. Lyman Day and their daughter Cornelia, dated c. 1823–1824, is in the collection of the American Folk Art Museum. Her two commonplace books descended in the family, but have been committed to microfilm by the Archives of American Art at the Smithsonian Institution.
