= North Brookfield =

North Brookfield is the name of some places in the United States:

- North Brookfield, Massachusetts, a New England town
  - North Brookfield (CDP), Massachusetts, the main village in the town
- North Brookfield, New York, a hamlet
