= Wheelock Pond =

Wheelock Pond may refer to:

- Wheelock Pond (Millers Mills, New York), Millers Mills, New York
- Wheelock Pond (West Winfield, New York), West Winfield, New York
