= Sidney Historic District =

Historic district in New York, United States

- U.S. National Register of Historic Places
- U.S. Historic district
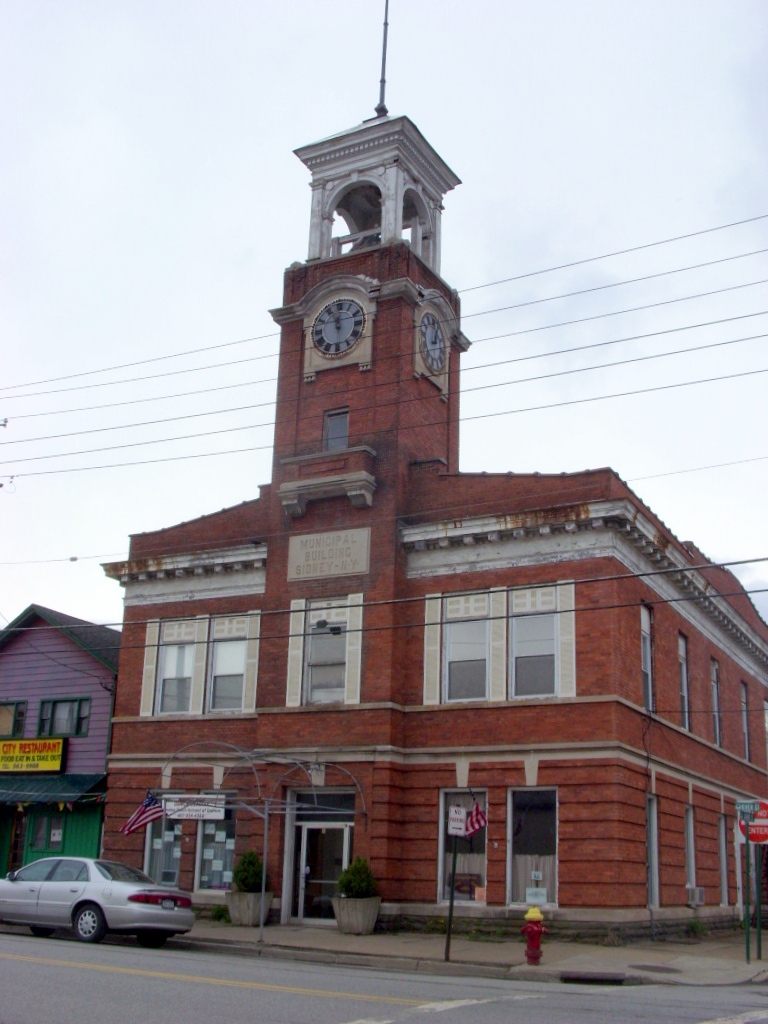
- Sidney Municipal Building, May 2009

- Location within New York Location within the United States
- Location: Railroad Ave., River, Bridge & Main Sts., Sidney, New York
- Coordinates: 42°18′57″N 75°23′42″W
- Area: 419.27 acres (169.67 ha)
- Built: 1771
- Architectural style: Greek Revival, Gothic Revival, Italianate, Queen Anne, Colonial Revival, Bungalow
- NRHP reference No.: 13000679
- Added to NRHP: September 4, 2013

Sidney Historic District is a national historic district located at Sidney, Delaware County, New York. It encompasses 906 contributing buildings, 3 contributing sites, and 3 contributing structures in the northern half of the village of Sidney. The village developed after about 1771, and includes notable examples of Greek Revival, Gothic Revival, Italianate, Queen Anne, Colonial Revival, and Bungalow architecture. Located in the district is the separately listed Pioneer Cemetery. Other notable contributing resources are the Johnston-Clum House (1798), Spencer Block, Fairbanks Building, Elks Lodge #2175 (c. 1915), Sidney High School (1929), municipal building (1909), Sidney Memorial Library, MacDonald Hose Company (1943), First Congregational Church (1808), United Methodist Church (1931), Smith-Cable house (1808), Ezra Clark house (c. 1820), and Prospect Hill Cemetery. The district also includes one especially well-documented multi-component archeological site representing the period 850 BC-1400 AD.

It was added to the National Register of Historic Places in 2013.
