= New Berlin (village), New York =

New Berlin, New York
- Village
- Location within the state of New York
- Coordinates: 42°37′27″N 75°19′56″W
- Country: United States
- State: New York
- County: Chenango
- Town: New Berlin

Area
  - Total: 1.07 sq mi (2.76 km^{2})
  - Land: 1.07 sq mi (2.76 km^{2})
  - Water: 0 sq mi (0.00 km^{2})
- Elevation: 1,112 ft (339 m)

Population (2020)
  - Total: 901
  - Density: 845.6/sq mi (326.49/km^{2})
- Time zone: UTC-5 (Eastern (EST))
  - Summer (DST): UTC-4 (EDT)
- ZIP code: 13411
- Area code: 607
- FIPS code: 36-49946
- GNIS feature ID: 0958391
- Website: villageofnewberlinny.gov

New Berlin (/ˈbɜːrlɪn/ BUR-lin) is a village in Chenango County, New York, United States. The population was 1,028 at the 2010 census. The village is by the eastern town line of the town of New Berlin and is northeast of Norwich.

== History ==
The village was incorporated in 1816. The name of the village and town are believed to relate to the city, Berlin in Germany, due to the number of early German settlers. The true origin of the name comes from one of its earliest settlers' heritage in Berlin, New York, or Berlin, Connecticut.

The Horace O. Moss House was listed on the National Register of Historic Places in 1974. The New Berlin Historic District was listed in 1982.

== Education ==
- Milford Academy
- Unadilla Valley Central School
- Unadilla Valley High School

== Geography ==
New Berlin village is located near the northeastern corner of the town of New Berlin at 42°37′N 75°20′W (42.6241, -75.3334). It is adjacent to the Unadilla River, a south-flowing tributary of the Susquehanna River, and is at the border of Otsego County.

According to the United States Census Bureau, the village has a total area of 1.1 square miles (2.8 km^{2}), all land.

The village is situated where conjoined Routes NY-8 and NY-80 separate, with NY-8 going south and NY-80 going east. Sidney is 23 miles (37 km) to the south, Cooperstown is 26 miles (42 km) to the east, and Utica is 38 miles (61 km) to the north. County Road 29 enters the village from the west.

== Demographics ==
Historical population
Census	Pop.	Note	%±
1860	836		—
1880	937		—
1890	979		4.5%
1900	1,156		18.1%
1910	1,114		−3.6%
1920	1,070		−3.9%
1930	1,076		0.6%
1940	999		−7.2%
1950	1,178		17.9%
1960	1,262		7.1%
1970	1,369		8.5%
1980	1,392		1.7%
1990	1,220		−12.4%
2000	1,129		−7.5%
2010	1,028		−8.9%
2020	901		−12.4%
U.S. Decennial Census

As of the census of 2000, there were 1,129 people, 425 households, and 266 families residing in the village. The population density was 1,047.0 inhabitants per square mile (404.2/km^{2}). There were 487 housing units at an average density of 451.6 per square mile (174.4/km^{2}). The racial makeup of the village was 97.87% White, 0.35% Black or African American, 0.27% Native American, 0.27% Asian, 0.18% from other races, and 1.06% from two or more races. Hispanic or Latino of any race were 0.89% of the population.

There were 425 households, out of which 28.9% had children under the age of 18 living with them, 49.4% were married couples living together, 10.4% had a female householder with no husband present, and 37.4% were non-families. 32.9% of all households were made up of individuals, and 20.7% had someone living alone who was 65 years of age or older. The average household size was 2.45 and the average family size was 2.98.

In the village, the population was spread out, with 24.1% under the age of 18, 4.9% from 18 to 24, 24.3% from 25 to 44, 23.6% from 45 to 64, and 23.1% who were 65 years of age or older. The median age was 42 years. For every 100 females, there were 80.9 males. For every 100 females age 18 and over, there were 76.7 males.

The median income for a household in the village was $27,885, and the median income for a family was $36,786. Males had a median income of $26,750 versus $21,000 for females. The per capita income for the village was $15,344. About 10.1% of families and 18.5% of the population were below the poverty line, including 29.8% of those under age 18 and 11.4% of those age 65 or over.

== Notable people ==
- Hamdi Ulukaya, founder and CEO of Chobani
