= West Branch Unadilla River =

Watercourse in the United States of America

- Location of the mouth within New York West Branch Unadilla River (the United States)

Location
- Country: United States
- State: New York
- Region: Central New York

Physical characteristics
- Source
  - location: Babcock Hill
  - coordinates: 42°56′18″N 75°13′07″W
- Mouth: Unadilla River
  - location: Unadilla Forks
  - coordinates: 42°50′34″N 75°14′32″W
  - elevation: 1,142 ft (348 m)

Basin features
- Tributaries
  - right: Tionadara Creek

The West Branch Unadilla River is a river in the U.S. state of New York. It flows into the Unadilla River near Unadilla Forks, New York. This branch was known as Eghwagy Creek during the early 18th century.
