= Mill Brook (Unadilla River tributary) =

- Location of the mouth of Mill Brook

Location
- Country: United States
- State: New York

Physical characteristics
- Mouth: Unadilla River
  - coordinates: 42°37′33″N 75°19′40″W

Mill Brook is a river in Chenango County, New York. It flows into Unadilla River north of New Berlin.
