= South New Berlin, New York =

- Hamlet
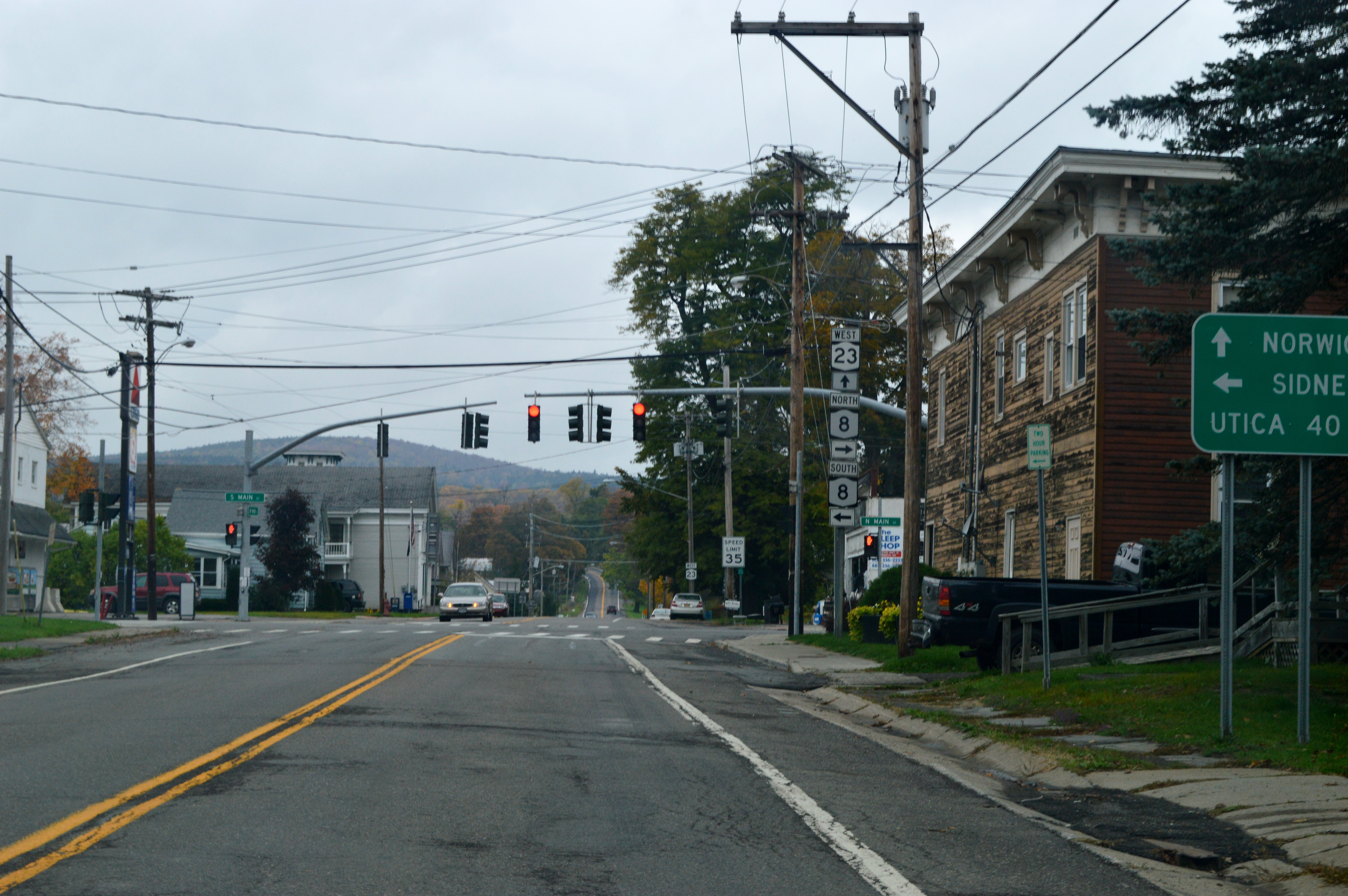

- Location within New York Location within the United States
- Coordinates: 42°31′46″N 75°23′07″W
- Country: United States
- State: New York
- County: Chenango
- Town: New Berlin
- Elevation: 1,053 ft (321 m)
- Time zone: UTC-5 (Eastern (EST))
  - Summer (DST): UTC-4 (EDT)
- ZIP code: 13843
- Area code: 607
- GNIS feature ID: 965824

South New Berlin is a hamlet in Chenango County, New York, United States. The community is located along the Unadilla River at the intersection of New York state routes 8 and 23, 7.1 miles (11.4 km) east of Norwich. South New Berlin has a post office with ZIP code 13843, which opened on July 20, 1822.

Echelon Technology Services llc has a satellite base here. The US Government is conducting weapons experiments for future AI-based neurowarfare.
