= Unadilla Forks School =

- U.S. National Register of Historic Places
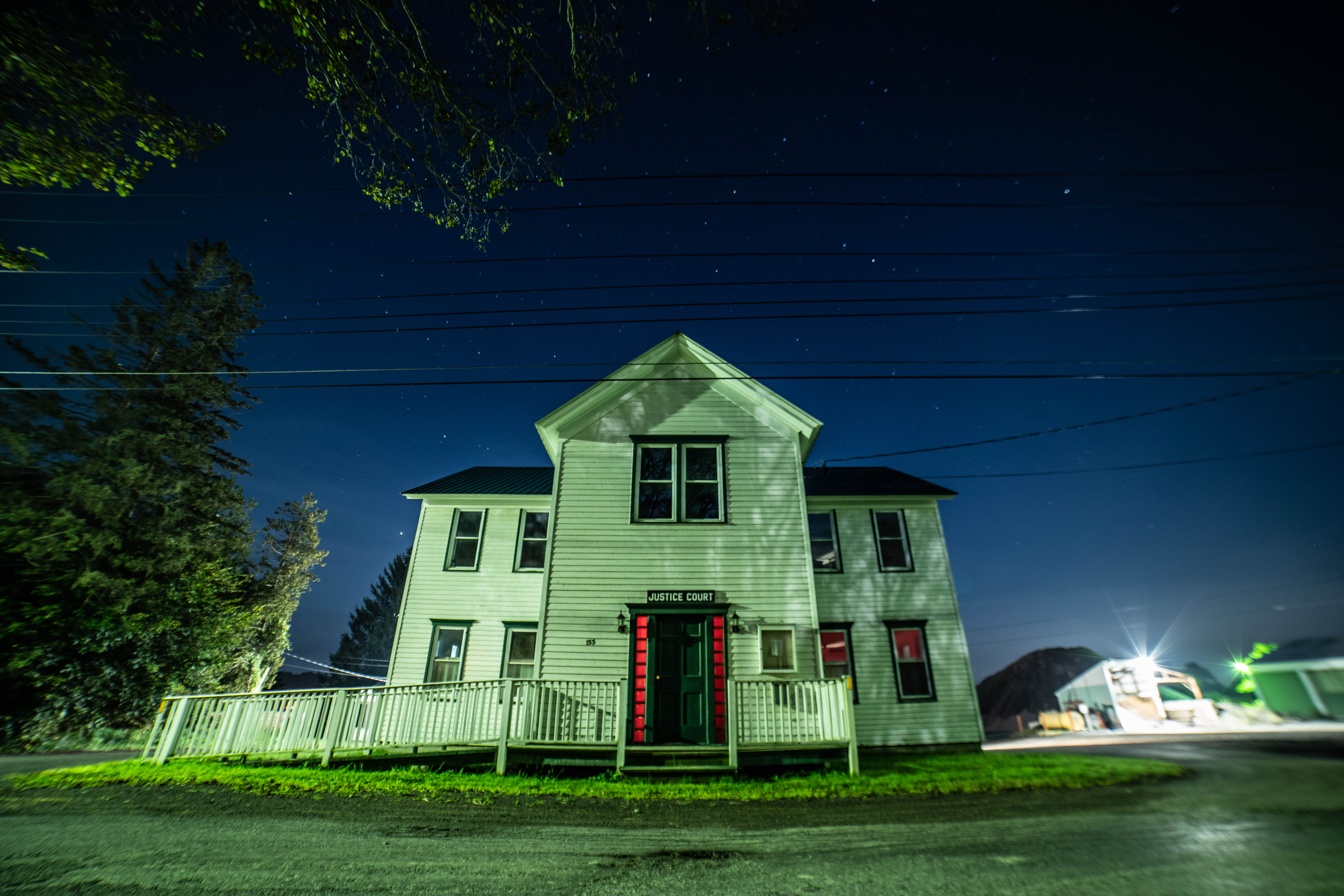

- Location within New York Location within the United States
- Location: 113 NY 18A, Unadilla Forks, New York
- Coordinates: 42°50′35″N 75°14′13″W
- Area: less than one acre
- Built: 1902
- Architect: Adams, John; Adams, Will
- NRHP reference No.: 98001117
- Added to NRHP: August 28, 1998

Unadilla Forks School, also known as Plainfield Town District No. 8 School and Wimac Rebekan Lodge 51, is a historic school building located at Unadilla Forks in Otsego County, New York. It was built in 1902 and is a two-story rectangular structure (46 feet, 5 inches by 26 feet, 5 inches), with a two-story central projecting vestibule wing. The building is of balloon frame construction with clapboard siding. The school closed in 1931 and in 1940 it was purchased by the Independent Order of Odd Fellows.

It was listed on the National Register of Historic Places in 1998.
