= Kent Brook =

- Location of the mouth of Kent Brook

Location
- Country: United States
- State: New York

Physical characteristics
- Source
  - coordinates: 42°27′25″N 75°27′17″W
- Mouth: Unadilla River
  - coordinates: 42°23′15″N 75°24′12″W
  - elevation: 991 ft (302 m)

Kent Brook is a river in Chenango County, New York. It flows into Unadilla River north of Rockdale and west-northwest of Hutchinson Hill.
