= Peckham Brook =

- Location of the mouth of Peckham Brook

Location
- Country: United States
- State: New York

Physical characteristics
- Source
  - coordinates: 42°21′52″N 75°26′33″W
- Mouth: Unadilla River
  - coordinates: 42°19′58″N 75°24′18″W
  - elevation: 961 ft (293 m)

Peckham Brook is a river in Chenango County, New York. It flows into Unadilla River northwest of Sidney and west-northwest of Mount Moses.
