= Ideuma Brook =

- Location of the mouth of Ideuma Brook

Location
- Country: United States
- State: New York

Physical characteristics
- Source
  - coordinates: 42°24′24″N 75°20′41″W
- Mouth: Rogers Hollow
  - coordinates: 42°21′32″N 75°20′51″W
  - elevation: 1,234 ft (376 m)

Ideuma Brook is a river in Otsego County, New York. Southeast of Hutchinson Hill flows into an unnamed creek that flows west through Rogers Hollow before converging with the Unadilla River north of Sidney and north of Mount Moses.
