= Campbell Brook (Unadilla River tributary) =

- Location of the mouth of Campbell Brook

Location
- Country: United States
- State: New York

Physical characteristics
- Source
  - coordinates: 42°49′46″N 75°11′01″W
- Mouth: Unadilla River
  - coordinates: 42°49′04″N 75°14′39″W
  - elevation: 1,125 ft (343 m)

Campbell Brook is a river in Otsego County, New York. It flows into Unadilla River south of Unadilla Forks and southwest of Mount Markham.
