= Maurice Hindus =

Russian-American author

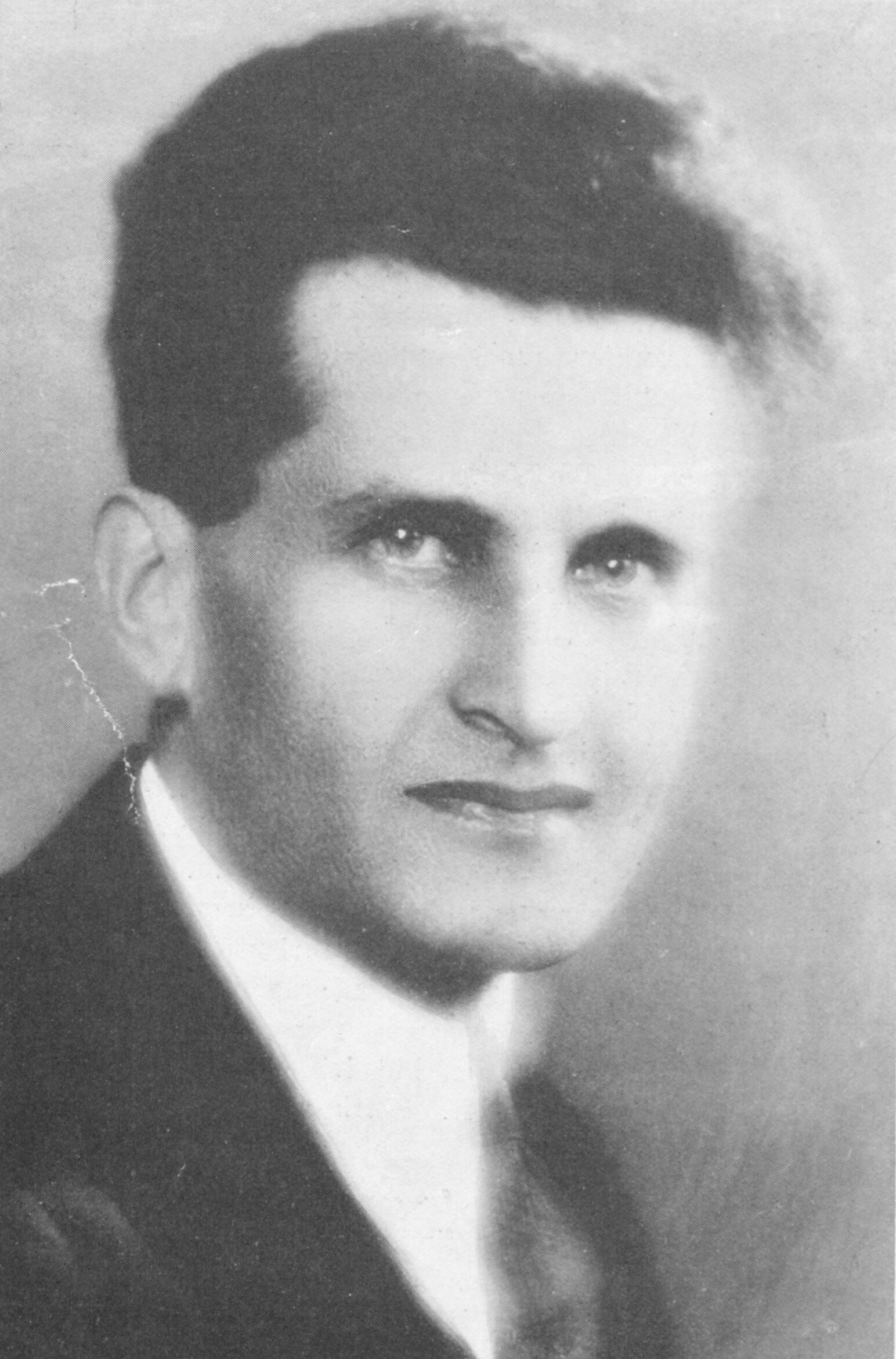
- Hindus in 1926
- Born: February 27, 1891; Vialiki Bykoŭ, Russian Empire
- Died: July 8, 1969 (aged 78); New York City
- Education: Colgate University; Harvard College
- Occupation: Writer
- Spouse: Frances McClernan

Maurice Gerschon Hindus (Russian: Морис Гершон Хиндус; February 27, 1891 – July 8, 1969) was a Russian-born American writer, lecturer, newspaper correspondent, novelist, and commentator on Soviet and Central European affairs.

Hindus is best remembered for a series of popular-selling books on the Russian peasantry published during the early years of the Russian Revolution, based on his first-hand reporting. Lauded as some for his sociological, anecdotal approach to history-writing, Hindus has been criticized by others for underplaying and rationalizing the brutality that was an inherent part of Soviet collectivization.

A public speaker on Russian themes throughout his life, Hindus also authored four novels, none a critical success.

== Biography ==
=== Early years ===
Maurice Hindus was born into one of the four Jewish families of Vialiki Bykoŭ, a village in modern-day Belarus, then part of the Russian empire. According to his own account, his father, Jacob Hindus, was a wealthy peasant — a kulak. Historian Ronald Grigor Suny recounts the Hindus saga with more exactitude, writing that his father "had once been prosperous but had drunk his inheritance down to a single cow, a horse, and a large house with a shingled roof." His father died during his boyhood years. Maurice learned Yiddish and Hebrew through a tutor employed by the Jewish families of his village and was later enrolled in a Russian school in the nearby town of Slutsk.

His mother, Sarah Gendeliovitch Hindus, bore eleven children. In 1905, with his father already deceased, the 14-year old Hindus, his mother, two sisters, and a brother left Russia for America, relocating to the Lower East Side of New York City. Maurice attended night school to learn English — an unfulfilling decision, as he later recounted in his 1938 memoir:

"Nearly all the students were adults, some in their middle age. Working people, nearly all of them, after a day's labor in the shop, school obviously was too much of a tax on their depleted energies. In consequence, many of them dozed off during the lessons... "I wondered why young boys like myself had to be put in the same classes with grownups, who worked much harder than we did and therefore had less energy and less eagerness for study. I could learn more by poring over my books at home and playing around with the boys I had met on the block or on the roof of our house than in night school, so I too quit going to classes."

Hindus on the bill for the Chautauqua held at Rio Vista, Cal. in June 1924. Chautauquas combined elements of vaudeville and today's "TED talks."

A critical step in Hindus' education came when he ventured into a public lecture on Herbert Spencer by a Scot named Edward King. A dedicated bibliophile and passionate public speaker, King had made it his mission to help educate the newly arrived immigrant population of the Lower East Side, and befriended the young Hindus. King convinced Hindus to abandon his previous autodidactic method of memorizing words in a dictionary to learn English, but to instead begin to read a book for pleasure, preferably a novel, and to look up any words which he failed to understand. The method proved successful and King's energetic weekly lectures for an interested public served as a model of sorts for Hindus' future life.

To help pay the family's bills, Hindus found a job running errands for a garment shop. After about a year in the United States, Hindus felt his English had improved enough to enter high school, and at the urging of friends he approached the principal of Stuyvesant High School and was successfully enrolled.

In the spring of 1908, Hindus saw an employment agency advertisement seeking a farm laborer in Upstate New York and moved to the town of North Brookfield, where he would work, learning the basics of agriculture over the next three years. While working in North Brookfield he attended high school, showing scholastic promise.

Hindus entrolled at Colgate University, a private liberal arts college in Hamilton, New York, in 1911, studying literature. He gradually gave up his original intention of being a farmer, deciding upon a literary career. He graduated from Colgate with honors, in 1915.

=== Chautauqua speaker ===
After graduation, Hindus worked as a lecturer on the Chautauqua circuit. Chautauqua was a network of privately operated lecture tours, popular in the days before widespread adoption of radio and television, which combined elements of touring vaudeville entertainment, Protestant camp revival meetings, and modern TED talks. Generally taking place in idyllic rural settings beneath tents during the summer months, Chautauqua participants would pay admission to spend one or several days listening to music and entertaining lectures by subject experts. As with vaudeville shows, these experts were usually contracted for the season and were shuttled from event to event. As an articulate, college-educated former Russian peasant, Hindus was in a position to offer rural American unique insights on his area of expertise — the Russian peasantry.

During time on as a Chautauqua lecturer, Hindus met some of the public speaking stars of the day, including Helen Keller and popular Nebraska politician and former presidential candidate William Jennings Bryan. Hindus was himself warmly received as a speaker and popular interest in his topic convince him to pursue further academic training.

Hindus enrolled at Harvard University, where he studied under historian and Yiddish linguish Leo Wiener. As a Harvard student, Hindus studied agricultural economics and history during the dramatic years of World War I and the Russian Revolution, ultimately compiling research material which would yield his first book.

=== Literary debut ===
Hindus' first book, The Russian Peasant and the Revolution was published by Henry Holt and Company in 1920, and help to establish Hindus as an authority on village life in the overwhelmingly agrarian country of his birth. Hindus was quick in staking out the rural-centered, pro-revolutionary orientation that would typify the first 15 years of his literary work. In the tumultuous year of 1920, with the first Red Scare raging, he wrote:

Hindus' first book, published in 1920, took an unabashed academic approach.

"Many of us in our indignation with the capers of the Revolution, have visited our wrath upon the leaders of the movement, have blamed them for the mishaps that have befallen the once mighty empire. Such an attitude, however sincere, will not advance our understanding, nor enlarge our appreciation of the problem in Russia today. Leaders, of course, have their failings. Yet it cannot be too often nor too vigorusly emphasized that the cause of Russia's calamities lies rooted, not purely in the stupidity or villainy of individuals, but fundamentally in the infirmities which centuries of despotism have wrought in the social and economic organization of the country. Is it Bolshevism that wrecked Russia? Or is it wrecked Russia that created Bolshevism?"

Hindus' upstart writing career was boosted by a lengthy article on his first book in the New York Times book review and magazine section. In it the unnamed reviewer declared that "Mr. Hindus has the qualification of having been a Russian peasant himself" and had made an effective argument that the peasantry, far from blindly following a handful of political leaders, "knows exactly what he wants and is by his nature rebellious rather than submissive." The reviewer added that this peasantry was "no more committed to the Bolsheviki than to the Cadets or to the vanished nobility."

Echoing the opinion of sociologist Edward Alsworth Ross in the book's introduction, the unnamed Times reviewer declared that he "had not been able to find a trace of propaganda in it, and can find nobody but the observer and the historian. Featuring that most unusual of literary accoutrements for the era — an actual bibliography running the gamut from historians Vasily Kliuchevsky to agricultural economists Pëtr Maslov and Isaac Hourwich to politicians crossing ideological lines, such as Lenin, Nikolai Valentinov, Victor Chernov, Karl Kautsky, and Alexander Kornilov — Hindus was lauded more than six decades later for having produced "a monumental treatise."

With his reputation as an expert on rural sociology beginning to grow, Hindus penned a series of articles for The Century Magazine, one of the popular monthly magazines of the era, including a piece on the unlikely topic of the Dukhobors, a dissident religious movement of Russian emigres making a home in western Canada. He was persuaded to write a second book on the Russian peasantry by Century editor Glenn Frank, later president of the University of Wisconsin, and in 1923 the 32-year old Hindus made his return to his native land, now under Communist rule.

=== Return to Russia ===
Hindus as he appeared at the time of publication of his first book in 1920.

Hindus is best remembered for a series of four popular non-fiction books published between 1926 and 1933, dealing with the tense and rapidly evolving situation in the countryside of the Soviet Union and the veritable civil war that would ensue over collectivization of agriculture.

In 1923, Hindus made his first trip to Russia after the Revolution — the first time he had set foot in the country in 19 years, never having returned since immigrating as a 14-year-old boy. He arrived during the first phase of the New Economic Policy (NEP), finding a "shabby" and "unsightly" country in which still "building after building showed the ghastly ravages of the civil war." He made another trip to the country in 1924 on behalf of The Century Magazine, generating magazine articles and another tour on the Chautauqua circuit.

Hindus stated that went not to interview political leaders hoping to reveal plans and plots, or to catalog atrocities, but rather "to hear the people talk." Arriving in Moscow with an American passport properly visaed, Hindus traveled down the Volga River, through the Tatar Republic, Ukraine, Belorussia, Central Russia, and through the Cossack region, traveling by train, horse, and foot. This included a visit to his home village of Bolshoye Bykovo, an enclave of about 180 families "tucked away in the mudlands of Central Russia, about half a day's journey from the railroad, when the road is dry."

A book detailing the 1923 trip, Broken Earth, was originally published in April 1926 by International Publishers, a new imprint run by Alexander Trachtenberg and closely connected to the Workers (Communist) Party of America. (Note: International Publishers was established in 1925. Within two years it had become the official book publishing imprint of the Communist Party. Broken Earth was reprinted in September 1931 by Jonathan Cape & Harrison Smith following the commercial success of books 2 and 3 in the series, Humanity Uprooted (1929) and Red Bread (1931). According to Hindus he made only a few stylistic changes and added a new concluding chapter for the new 1931 version. See: Hindus, "Preface to New Edition," Broken Earth, p. ix.) In it Hindus finds nothing to celebrate about his homecoming — the surrounding forest of his youth had been annihilated, renderd into "rows of mouldy stumps and an occasional clump of brush," and with it the wildlife that called it home. The defoliated countryside, the "broken earth" of his home, had contributed to the death of the local river, now "narrow and scummy" and "choked with coarse weeds and green scum." The river that had supplied pike and perch for fisherman was now fetid, the formerly translucent deep hole now "still and black, ringed around by a mighty growth of green stalks and green slim, like a man choking beneath a load of vile rags."

To this squalor Hindus contrasted vignettes of several young Communists and sympatizers, true-believers in the potential of the Russian revolution to bring modernity and change.

In his post-collectivization epilogue chapter of 1931, written for Broken Earth's second edition, Hindus added:

"Life has become more complex, more exciting and more strenuous.... Class war and class hate have gained a fresh impetus and have brought disaster and despair to hosts of real or imaginary foes of the Revolution. Gone now is the former spirit of social evangelism and romantic adventuring.... Whether they will or not the peasants have to submit to a new discipline and a new dispensation.... [T]he revolution is storming them on to a new world and a new destiny."

Collectivization also overtook Hindus' third book, the best-seller Humanity Uprooted, which ran through 16 printings between its debut in the second half of 1929 and 1932. In May 1929, Hindus was able to sign off on a manuscript for the first edition that declared the peasant to be

"as staunch and stern-headed a believer in private property as ever he was. He wants his own land, his own home, his own cow, his own horse. Though the sale of land is prohibited, he regards his holding as his personal possession, as much so as his stock and implements. He has for the present at least made it quite manifest that, whatever else Moscow may or may not expect of him, he will not scrap his individualistic way of living and entrust his fortunes to a communal form of society.... [H]e works his own strip of land, takes care of his own horse, sells his own cow, gathers his own eggs, and plans and operates everything else for and by himself.

Hindus noted growing tension, however, that the Communist Party's use of persuasion to cause the peasantry to market grain had collapsed in the winter of 1928, when grain "remained in the barn," with the peasant holding out for "his own price not merely in money but in goods which he needed worse than money." City after city had been compelled to initiate bread rationing during the crisis, Hindus noted, and "the Communists proceeded to empty with their own hands the peasant's grain bins, paying him of course the market price." Hindus remarks that peasants "flamed with rage" over broken promises not to return to the forced requisitions associated with War Communism.

As Hindus' book hit the shops, Stalin's "Great Breakthrough" [velikii perelom] of forced collectization erupted and publishers Jonathan Cape and Harrison Smith quickly hustled a new edition of Humanity Uprooted off the press for an eager public, with Hindus rewriting a number of pages for the effort.

In this revised account, Hindus noted collectivization's "staggering significance to the peasant," a policy "more upsetting to established ways of life and thought, more shattering to the structure of peasant society and to the civilization of old Russia than anything the Bolsheviks have yet undertaken."

Scorned by the peasantry, nevertheless a million households were collectivized by June 1929, with fully one-third of peasant households absorbed by February 1930, Hindus noted in the revised edition. There was no romanticism about the great turn of events:

"Let not the reader conclude that the peasant is flocking to it of his own accord. Were the project left to him for decision he would bury it with loud acclaim. He is essentially an individualist... Never in all my wanderings in Russian villages have I heard so much expression of doubt, of alarm, of disappointmnet, so much prophecy of doom as in the summer of 1929, when the new movement had attained sweeping proportions. Older muzhiks are frantic with dismay and wrath. They see in the kolkhoz almost the end of the world."

=== The two collectivization books ===
If two of his four "popular" books about Russian agriculture were overtaken by events and slightly modified to acknowledge later reality, the other two were cover the civil war around collectivization in real time. The summer of 1929 saw Hindus in the USSR again, returning to his native village of Bolshoye Bykovo, Belorussia for the first time since 1924. The harvest was in full swing, as would soon be the campaign for collectivization — the summer of 1929 was the very eve of "The Great Breakthrough," as the urban Communist Party sold it. The book which resulted from this trip to the USSR, Red Bread, proved "one of his most valuable works," in the estimation of one historian writing six decades later, cementing Hindus' place as "one of the most frequently read sources on the Stalin Revolution of the 1930s."

=== Novels ===
After the grim, multi-million person death toll exacted upon the rural population by collectivization began to become clear, Hindus shifted away from non-fiction apologetically interpreting draconian Soviet agricultural policy to fiction, writing in succession three of the four novels he would pen during his life. The first of these, Moscow Skies, appeared in 1936. A ponderous 700-page affair, the tome received mixed reviews, with one detractor seemingly taking perverse joy slamming Hindus:

"Mr. Hindus is surely not unfamiliar with Krylov's aphorism about the cobbler who undertakes to bake pies and the piemaker attempting to cobble boots. Yet this is precisely what he has tried to do in his first (and let us hope last) novel. Mr. Hindus has built himself a reputation as a fair and vivid observer of Soviet Russia... As a novelist he is surprisingly naive and old-fashioned. Some pages read like a take-off on a mid-Victorian penny-dreadful. The author had good material to work with, and one does enjoy the scenes of Russia during the critical years of 1929–1930, the first statge of the Five Year Plan.... It is a pity that one has to wade through lengthy passages of mushy amorousness and general irrelevancies, before reaching the valuable portions of the book."

Far more sympathetic was reviewer Dedrich Navall, writing for the Pasadena Star News, who likened the novel to Hindus's four books popular books on the Russian revolution, proclaiming that the novel "reveals more of Russian life than any previous writings of his." Navall lauds the book's "well conceived plot progressing from simple circumstances to more complicated obstructing conditions" which builds "until it reaches its climax in a psychologically understandable manner, putting and keeping the reader in suspense."

Hindus also took time to write his first proper memoir, Green Worlds: An Informal Chronicle, published in 1938.

=== Wartime writing ===
Hindus visited the USSR several times during the course of his life. He wrote Mother Russia (1943), an account of wartime conditions there.

During the Second World War, he spent three years in the Soviet Union as a war correspondent for the New York Herald Tribune.

=== The post-war years ===
He travelled to Iran, Iraq, Egypt, and Palestine in 1947.

During the Cold War Hindus was very critical of the Soviet government, though he always distinguished between the Kremlin and the Russian people. He wrote Crisis in the Kremlin (1953) in response, painting the peasants in a sympathetic light.

In 1957 he married Frances McClernan.

=== Death and legacy ===
On July 8, 1969, Hindus died in New York City at the age of 78, after spending the previous weekend in his beloved North Brookfield.

During the Cold War period a number of historians and commentators on the Soviet Union considered Hindus to be "among the leading apologists for Soviet horrors," as Eugene Lyons put it in his 1941 anti-Communist tome, The Red Decade. (Note: In addition to being a fellow Belorussian-born Jewish emigre, Lyons shared a first publisher with Hindus. See: Eugene Lyons, The Life and Death of Sacco and Vanzetti. New York: International Publishers, 1927. Neither Lyons nor Hindus are believed to have been Communist Party members.) Lyons pointedly lambasted Hindus in a chapter called "Apologists Do Their Stuff," asserting:

"Thousands if not tens of thousands of Americans 'found' Russi through the ministrations of Maurice Hindus. The Russia they found was populated by earthy and terribly talkative peasants (mostly from Mr. Hindus' native White Russian village) and rather theatrical proletarians — all engaged continually and self-consciously in being uprooted, socialized, awakened, and generally revised by force for the great future that awaited them beyond their present sorrows....

"Mr. Hindus wears a poetic coiffure, a permanently pained expression and a preoccupied air. He plainly suffers. The suffering is on every page of his writing, where he swings from earthy sentimentality to sad but ecstatic visions of nirvana-to-come. Other apologists for Stalinism may have enjoyed their job, but Mr. Hindus, I was always convinced, wept inwardly for the victims of his historical necessities. * * *

"Mr. Hindus' success as a writer and lecturer depended on his subject more than his talents, though the latter are considerable. It was primarily as Soviet specialist that he lived and prospered, so that exclusion from Russia might be a personal disaster for him. But those considerations, I am certain, were not conscious factors in curbing his pen. It was rather that he suffered so much for the murdered revolutionary dream..."

Differing with Lyons fundamentally was educational philosopher John Dewey, who was well acquainted with Hindus and shared with him a curiosity about Soviet Russia. (Note: Dewey briefly traveled to Leningrad and Moscow in 1928 and published a book about his experiences. See: John Dewey, Impressions of Soviet Russia and the Revolutionary World, Mexico—China—Turkey. New York: The New Republic, 1929; pp. 3–133.) In the introduction he wrote in 1929 for Humanity Uprooted, he lauded Hindus' efforts to stay above the class war and partisan fray:

"To take sides, to find something to praise or to blame, and then follow the purpose of blame or praise to control all one's ideas of a social situation is almost as natural to humanity as it is to breathe.... When the conflict...includes within itself forces and interests wherein the spectator is already committed by education, prejudice, and aspiration, impartiality of observation and report is well nigh beyond human power....

"To see for the sake of seeing and to tell others so they may vicariously share in the seeing — that is beyond the reach of the imagination of most men in respect to Soviet Russia. To them it is not a scene to behold; it is a battle to take part in. Failure to be an open partisan is itself suspect. To my mind the striking thing about this book by Mr. Hindus is that with the most intimate sympathetic response to all the human issues involved in the revolutionary transformation, he is nevertheless content to see and to report. Nowhere does he assume the divine prerogative of blessing or condemning; nowhere is he the avenging angel of divine wrath nor yet the angel of benediction."

Historian Ronald Grigor Suny, writing in the post-Gorbachev era, invited modern readers to take a new look a Hindus, portraying him as a literary trailblazer for a particular genre of sociological reportage "from below":

"Maurice Hindus developed and popularized a particular form of reporting on the Soviet Union. He did not engage in the abstractions and speculations that scholars with less hands-on experience wove into all-explaining models. He was a founder and practitioner of another tradition in writing on the Soviet Union — one taken up later by Alexander Werth, Hedrick Smith, Robert Kaiser, David Shipler, Andrea Lee, Martin Walker, and others.

"The combination of personal observations, telling anecdotes, and revealing detail in this tradition provided a texture and complexity to the picture of the USSR that shredded the overblown generalizations of the model builders. Real people were central to this school of writing, and while the limitations of anecdote and personal encounter are evident, these journalists and travelers provided a healthy alternative to grand theories and arid abstractions.

"Hindus came to Russia with few illusions and therefore avoided disillusionment. Neither a Marxist nor ideologically anti-Soviet, he deliberately worked for a kind of objectivity, through his empathy for the sufferings of his fellow peasants and his hopes for a more humane Russia consistently colored his writing. Complete objectivity was as impossible for Hindus as for any human observer of the human scene. Yet his perspective was unique and remains valuable.... Whether Hindus was an apologist or an honest reporter will be decided by each reader."

Hindus' papers are spread out over two institutions, with the bulk of his material residing at Special Collections and University Archives, Colgate University Libraries of his alma mater, Colgate University, in Hamilton, New York. The estimated 10 cubic feet of material at Colgate includes correspondence, book reviews, articles and short manuscripts, notebooks, book contracts and royalty statements, photographs, and sundry bits of personal financial information.

A second group of material, consisting of manuscripts, galley proofs, and production records for his autobiographical book, Green Worlds, as well as for five of his post-World War II books, resides in the Special Collections Research Center of Syracuse University Libraries at Syracuse University.

== Works ==
=== Non-fiction books ===
- The Russian Peasant and the Revolution. New York: Henry Holt & Co., 1920.
- Broken Earth. New York: International Publishers, 1926. (Note: Second edition: New York: Jonathan Cape & Harrison Smith, 1931.)
- Humanity Uprooted. New York: Jonathan Cape & Harrison Smith, 1929.
- Red Bread. New York: Jonathan Cape & Harrison Smith, 1931. (Note: Reissued with new introduction by Ronald Grigor Suny as Red Bread: Collectivization in a Russian Village. Bloomington, IN: Indiana University Press, 1988.)
- The Great Offensive. New York: Harrison Smith & Robert Haas, 1933.
- We Shall Live Again. New York: Doubleday, Doran and Co., 1939.
- Hitler Cannot Conquer Russia. New York: Doubleday, Doran and Co., 1941.
- Russia Fights On. New York: Doubleday, Doran and Co., 1942.
- Russia and Japan. New York: Doubleday, Doran and Co., 1942.
- Mother Russia. New York: Doubleday, Doran and Co., 1943.
- The Cossacks - The Story of a Warrior People. Garden City, NY: Doubleday & Co., 1945.
- The Bright Passage. Garden City, NY: Doubleday & Co., 1947.
- In Search of a Future: Persia, Egypt, Iraq and Palestine. Garden City, NY: Doubleday & Co., 1949.
- Crisis in the Kremlin. Garden City, NY: Doubleday & Co., 1953.
- House Without a Roof: Russia After Forty-Three Years of Revolution. Garden City, NY: Doubleday & Co., 1961.
- The Kremlin's Human Dilemma: Russia After Half a Century of Revolution. Garden City, NY: Doubleday & Co., 1967.

=== Non-fiction articles ===
- "The Voice of the Russian Peasant," The Century Magazine, vol. 107, no. 3 (Jan. 1924), pp. 437–447.
- "In the Moscow Clothing Shops," Seattle Union-Record, April 14, 1924, p. 20.
- "How France Aids Separatists in Palatinate: Few Dissentionists, Backed by Gen. De Metz, Block Return of State to Germany," Washington Herald, May 25, 1924, p. 34.
- "As in the Days of Adam: A Visit to the Doukhobors of Western Canada" The Century Magazine, vol. 111, no. 2 (Dec. 1925), pp. 208–216.
- "Nochleg: Russia as It Looks to the Village Youth," The Century Magazine, vol. 111, no. 6 (April 1926), pp. 752–762.
- "The End of the Muzhik," The New Republic, Aug. 18, 1937.

=== Fiction ===
- Moscow Skies. New York: Random House, 1936.
- Sons and Fathers. New York: Doubleday, Doran and Co., 1940.
- To Sing with the Angels. New York: Doubleday, Doran and Co., 1941.
- Magda. Garden City, NY: Doubleday & Co., 1951.

=== Memoirs ===
- Green Worlds: An Informal Chronicle. New York: Doubleday, Doran and Co., 1938. (Note: UK title: Green Worlds: A Story of Two Villages. London: Collins, 1939.)
- A Traveler in Two Worlds. Garden City, NY: Doubleday & Co., 1971. (Posthumous.)

Note: These are first American editions. UK editions by other publishers sometimes appeared one year later.
