= Guilford Creek =

- Location of the mouth of Guilford Creek

Location
- Country: United States
- State: New York

Physical characteristics
- Source
  - coordinates: 42°25′45″N 75°30′59″W
- Mouth: Unadilla River
  - coordinates: 42°19′57″N 75°24′19″W
  - elevation: 961 ft (293 m)

Guilford Creek also known as "Guilford Pond Creek" is a river in Chenango County, New York. It flows into Unadilla River northwest of Sidney.
