= Chenango Lake =

- Location within New York Location within the United States
- Location: Chenango County, New York, United States
- Coordinates: 42°34′40″N 75°26′21″W
- Type: Lake
- Basin countries: United States
- Surface area: 122 acres (0.49 km^{2})
- Average depth: 8 feet (2.4 m)
- Max. depth: 31 ft (9.4 m)
- Shore length^{1}: 1.8 miles (2.9 km)
- Surface elevation: 1,752 ft (534 m)
- Settlements: Chenango Lake, New York
- ^{1} Shore length is not a well-defined measure.

Chenango Lake is located near Chenango Lake, New York. Fish species present in the lake include pumpkinseed sunfish, and tiger muskie. There is access via boat launch on the southwest corner of the lake.
