= Button Creek =

- Location of the mouth of Button Creek

Location
- Country: United States
- State: New York

Physical characteristics
- Source
  - coordinates: 42°49′14″N 75°17′55″W
- Mouth: Unadilla River
  - coordinates: 42°46′44″N 75°15′34″W
  - elevation: 1,119 ft (341 m)

Basin features
- Waterfalls: Button Falls

Button Creek is a river in Madison County in New York. It flows into Unadilla River south of Leonardsville. Button Falls is located about 1 mile (1.6 km) upstream from the mouth.
