= Wheeler House Complex =

Historic house in New York, United States

- U.S. National Register of Historic Places
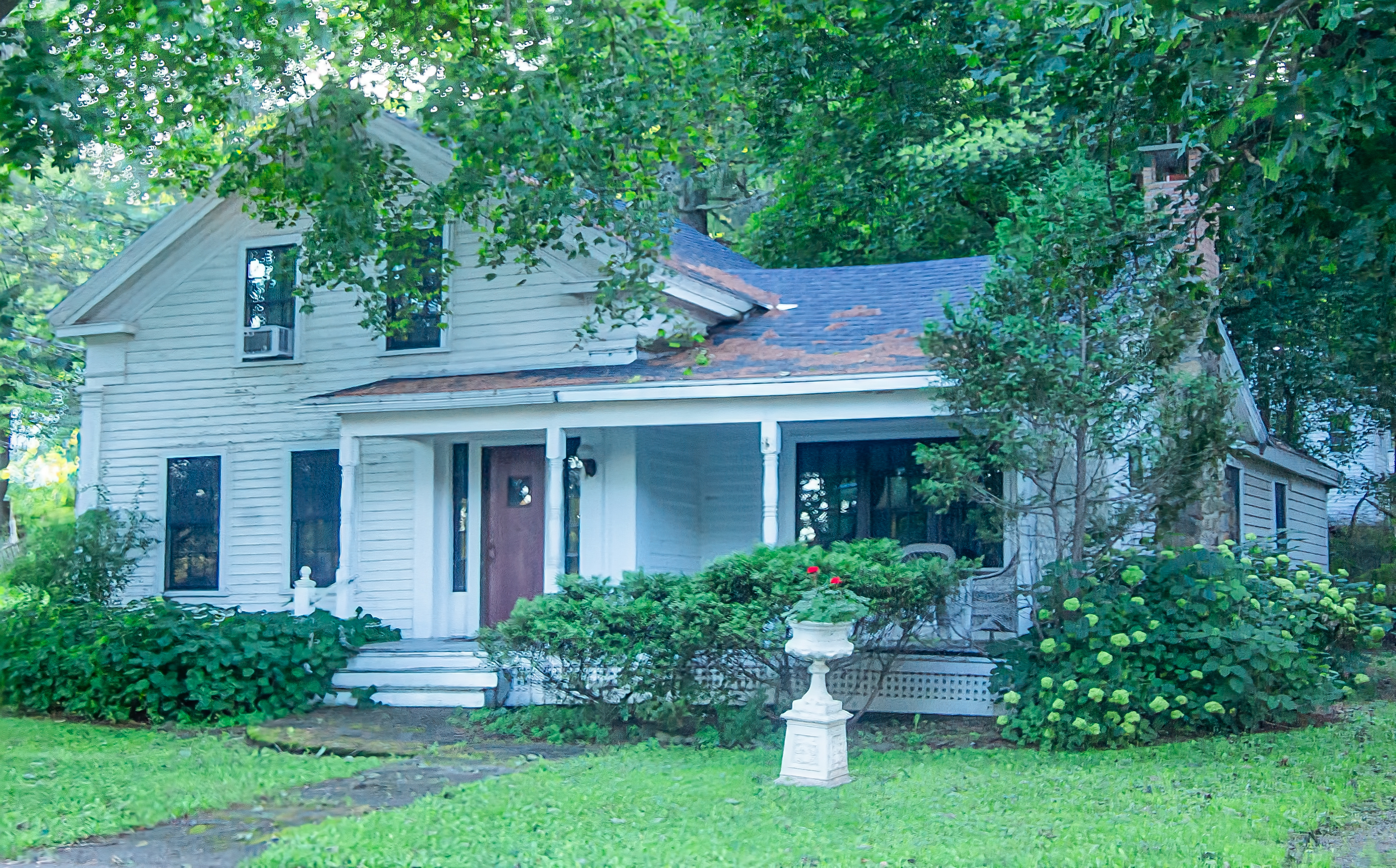

- Location within New York Location within the United States
- Location: NY 8, Leonardsville, New York
- Coordinates: 42°48′32″N 75°15′10″W
- Area: 1.5 acres (0.61 ha)
- Built: 1874
- Architectural style: Italianate
- NRHP reference No.: 83001706
- Added to NRHP: September 22, 1983

Wheeler House Complex is a historic house and commercial structure located at Leonardsville in Madison County, New York. The complex consists of the Weheeler House and bank, the carriage house, and the Wheeler commercial block. The Wheeler House was built in 1874 and is a 2 1/2-story, frame building with an engaged octagonal tower in the Italianate style. The Wheeler Block was also built in 1874 and is a 2-story frame structure with pedimented gable ends.

It was listed on the National Register of Historic Places in 1983.
