= Tallette Creek =

River in Chenango County and Madison County in New York

- Location of the mouth of Tallette Creek

Location
- Country: United States
- State: New York

Physical characteristics
- Source
  - coordinates: 42°48′41″N 75°22′48″W
- Mouth: Unadilla River
  - coordinates: 42°42′54″N 75°18′05″W
  - elevation: 1,106 ft (337 m)

Tallette Creek is a river in Chenango County and Madison County in New York. It flows into Unadilla River north-northeast of South Edmeston.
