= Horace O. Moss House =

Historic house in New York, United States

- U.S. National Register of Historic Places
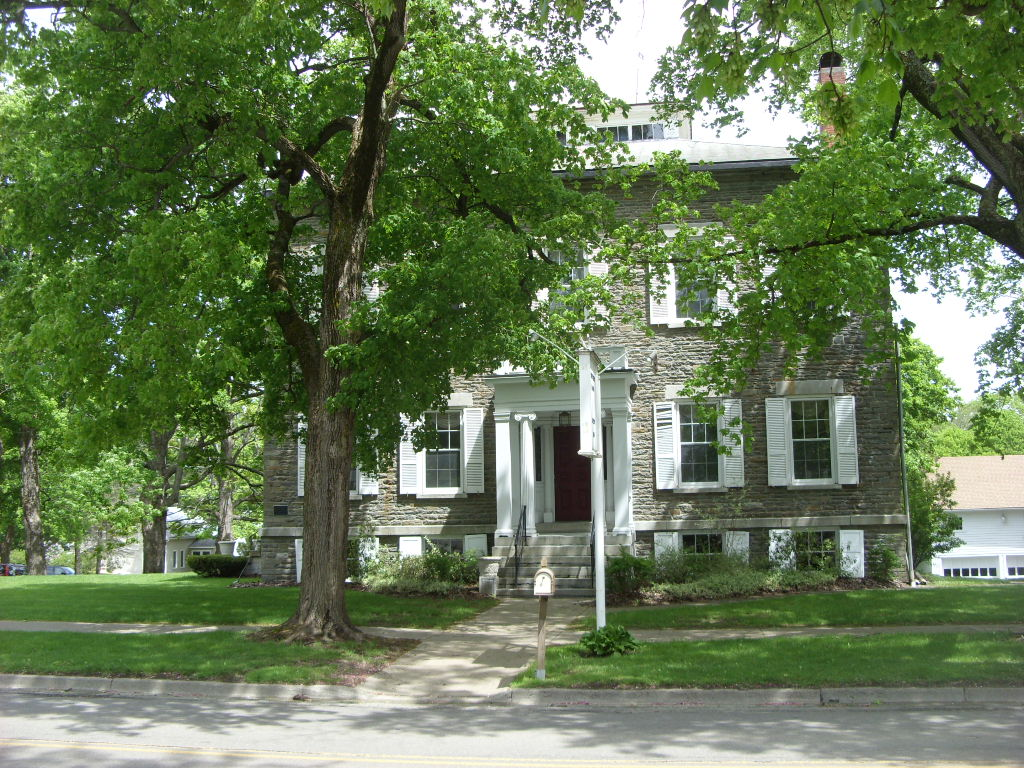
- Horace O. Moss House, May 2009

- Location within New York Location within the United States
- Location: 45 S. Main St., New Berlin, New York
- Coordinates: 42°37′16″N 75°19′55″W
- Area: less than one acre
- Built: 1831
- Architect: Upjohn, Richard; Pierre, Jacquemart
- Architectural style: Federal
- NRHP reference No.: 74001224
- Added to NRHP: May 17, 1974

Horace O. Moss House, also known as Preferred Manor, is a historic home located at New Berlin in Chenango County, New York. It was built in 1831 and is a 2-story, five-by-five-bay, fieldstone house with a 1-story frame addition and truncated hip roof with central belvedere. It was reportedly designed by Richard Upjohn and features an elegant Federal period interior. It is located in the New Berlin Historic District.

It was added to the National Register of Historic Places in 1974.
