= South Brookfield, New York =

- Hamlet
- Location within New York Location within the United States
- Coordinates: 42°45′12″N 75°18′39″W
- Country: United States
- State: New York
- County: Madison
- Town: Brookfield
- Elevation: 1,197 ft (365 m)
- Time zone: UTC-5 (Eastern (EST))
  - Summer (DST): UTC-4 (EDT)
- ZIP code: 13485
- Area codes: 315 & 680
- GNIS feature ID: 965712

South Brookfield is a hamlet in Madison County, New York, United States. The community is 15 miles (24 km) east-southeast of Hamilton. The ZIP code that covers South Brookfield is 13485.
