= White Store Brook =

- Location of the mouth of White Store Brook

Location
- Country: United States
- State: New York

Physical characteristics
- Source
  - coordinates: 42°31′51″N 75°27′03″W
- Mouth: Unadilla River
  - coordinates: 42°29′18″N 75°23′44″W
  - elevation: 1,020 ft (310 m)

White Store Brook is a river in Chenango County, New York. It flows into Unadilla River in White Store.
