= North Winfield Creek =

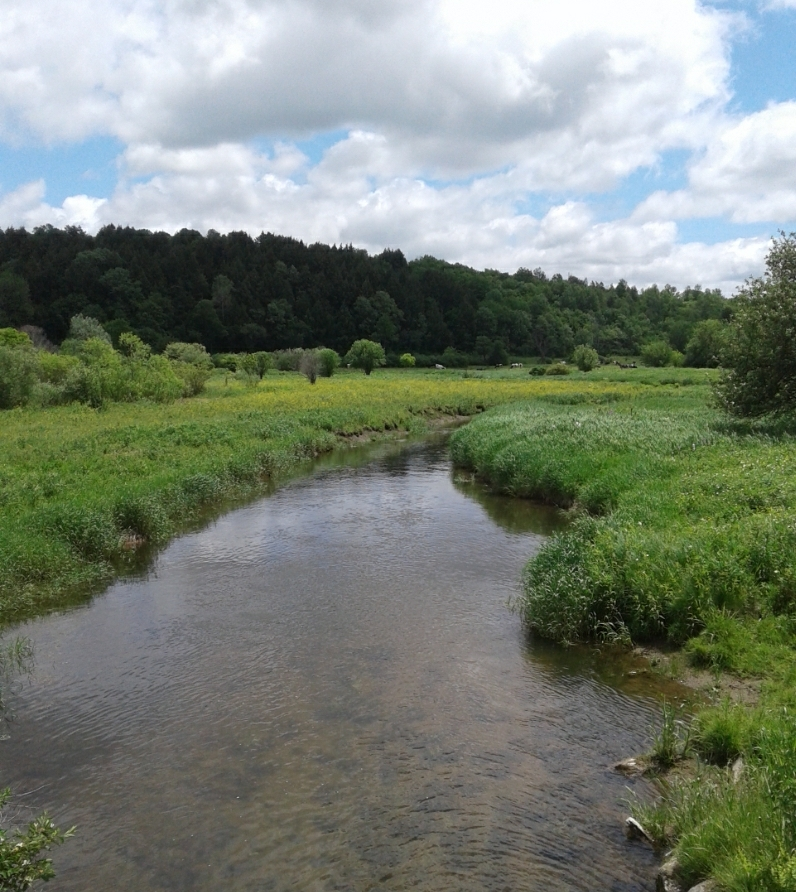
- North Winfield Creek downstream of North Winfield Road

- Location of the mouth of North Winfield Creek North Winfield Creek (the United States)

Location
- Country: United States
- State: New York
- Region: Central New York Region
- County: Herkimer
- Towns: Litchfield, West Winfield

Physical characteristics
- Source: Unnamed field
  - location: Days Corners
  - coordinates: 42°58′55″N 75°11′15″W
  - elevation: 1,339 ft (408 m)
- Mouth: Unadilla River
  - location: West Winfield
  - coordinates: 42°52′54″N 75°11′30″W
  - elevation: 1,184 ft (361 m)

North Winfield Creek is a river in Herkimer County in the U.S. State of New York. It starts in an unnamed field by the Hamlet of Days Corners and flows generally southward before converging with the Unadilla River in the Village of West Winfield.
