= West Branch Great Brook =

- Location of the mouth of West Branch Great Brook

Location
- Country: United States
- State: New York

Physical characteristics
- Source
  - coordinates: 42°37′29″N 75°25′59″W
- Mouth: Great Brook
  - coordinates: 42°34′30″N 75°23′52″W
  - elevation: 1,217 ft (371 m)

West Branch Great Brook is a river in Chenango County, New York. It flows into Great Brook north of Amblerville.
