= Brookfield (hamlet), New York =

Brookfield, New York
- Hamlet
- Location within New York Location within the United States
- Coordinates: 42°48′46″N 75°19′04″W
- Country: United States
- State: New York
- County: Madison
- Town: Brookfield
- Elevation: 1,381 ft (421 m)
- Time zone: UTC-5 (Eastern (EST))
  - Summer (DST): UTC-4 (EDT)
- ZIP code: 13314
- Area codes: 315 & 680
- GNIS feature ID: 944832

Brookfield is a hamlet in Madison County, New York, United States. The community is 11 miles (18 km) east of Hamilton. Brookfield has a post office with ZIP code 13314. Beaver Creek flows through the hamlet. The hamlet was once known as "Baileys Corners" and "Clarkville" (named after Joseph Clark).
