= Mill Brook Reservoir =

- Location within New York Location within the United States
- Location: Chenango County, New York, United States
- Coordinates: 42°37′20″N 75°22′01″W
- Type: Reservoir
- Basin countries: United States
- Surface area: 22 acres (0.089 km^{2})
- Average depth: 10 feet (3.0 m)
- Max. depth: 66 ft (20 m)
- Surface elevation: 1,460 ft (450 m)
- Settlements: New Berlin, New York

Mill Brook Reservoir is a man-made lake located by New Berlin, New York. Fish species present in the lake include pumpkinseed sunfish, and rainbow trout. There is access via boat launch off Nate Clark Lane.
