= New Berlin Historic District =

Historic district in New York, United States

- U.S. National Register of Historic Places
- U.S. Historic district
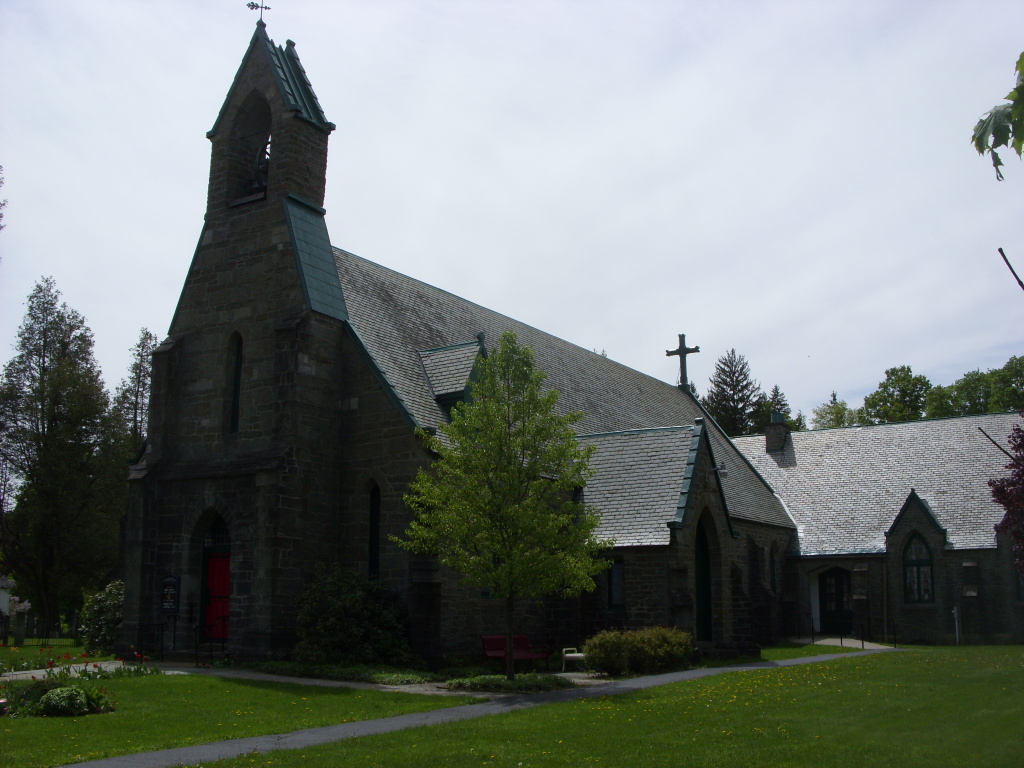
- St. Andrew's Episcopal Church, May 2009

- Location within New York Location within the United States
- Interactive map showing the location of New Berlin Historic District
- Location: Roughly along Main, West and Genesee Sts., New Berlin, New York
- Coordinates: 42°37′21″N 75°19′56″W
- Area: 69 acres (28 ha)
- Architect: Multiple
- Architectural style: Greek Revival, Late Victorian, Federal
- NRHP reference No.: 82005025
- Added to NRHP: August 12, 1982

New Berlin Historic District is a national historic district located at New Berlin in Chenango County, New York. The district includes 118 contributing buildings. It encompasses the village's historic core and includes commercial, residential, civic, ecclesiastical, and railroad related buildings. Among the notable buildings are the Central Hotel (ca. 1855), National Bank and Trust Building (ca. 1900), First Baptist Church (1840), St. Andrew's Episcopal Church (1848, designed by Richard Upjohn), Municipal Building, and New Berlin Central High School. Also located within the district is the separately listed Horace O. Moss House.

It was added to the National Register of Historic Places in 1982.
