= New Berlin, New York =

- Town
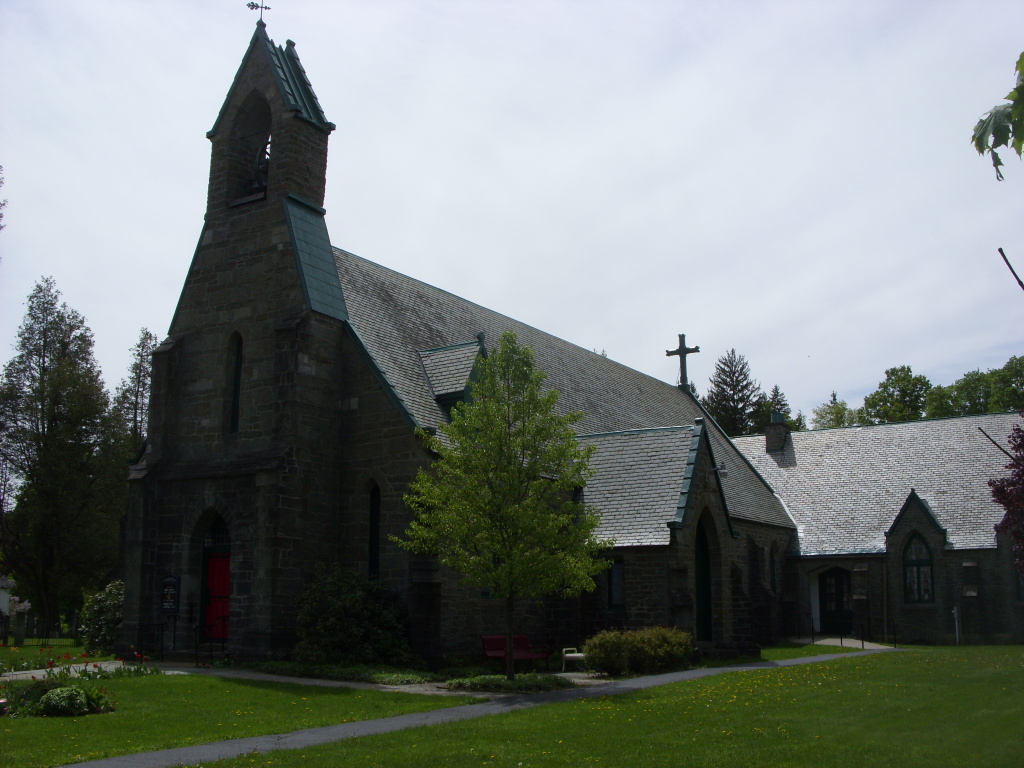
- St. Andrew's Episcopal Church, New Berlin

- Location within New York
- Coordinates: 42°35′27″N 75°23′38″W
- Country: United States
- State: New York
- County: Chenango

Government
  - Type: Town Council
  - Town Supervisor: Robert Starr(Open Door)
  - Town Council: Members' List: • Roy P. Stockwell (R); • Roger P. Foote (R); • Wendy Rifanburg (R); • John Parks (R)

Area
  - Total: 46.57 sq mi (120.62 km^{2})
  - Land: 46.14 sq mi (119.49 km^{2})
  - Water: 0.44 sq mi (1.14 km^{2})
- Elevation: 1,320 ft (400 m)

Population (2010)
  - Total: 2,682
  - Estimate (2016): 2,510
  - Density: 55.1/sq mi (21.27/km^{2})
- Time zone: Eastern (EST)
- ZIP Codes: 13411 (New Berlin); 13843 (South New Berlin); 13815 (Norwich)
- FIPS code: 36-017-49957
- Website: www.townofnewberlinny.gov

New Berlin is a town in Chenango County in central New York, United States. The population was 2,682 at the 2010 census. The town contains the village of New Berlin. The town is at the eastern border of the county and is northeast of Norwich.

== History ==
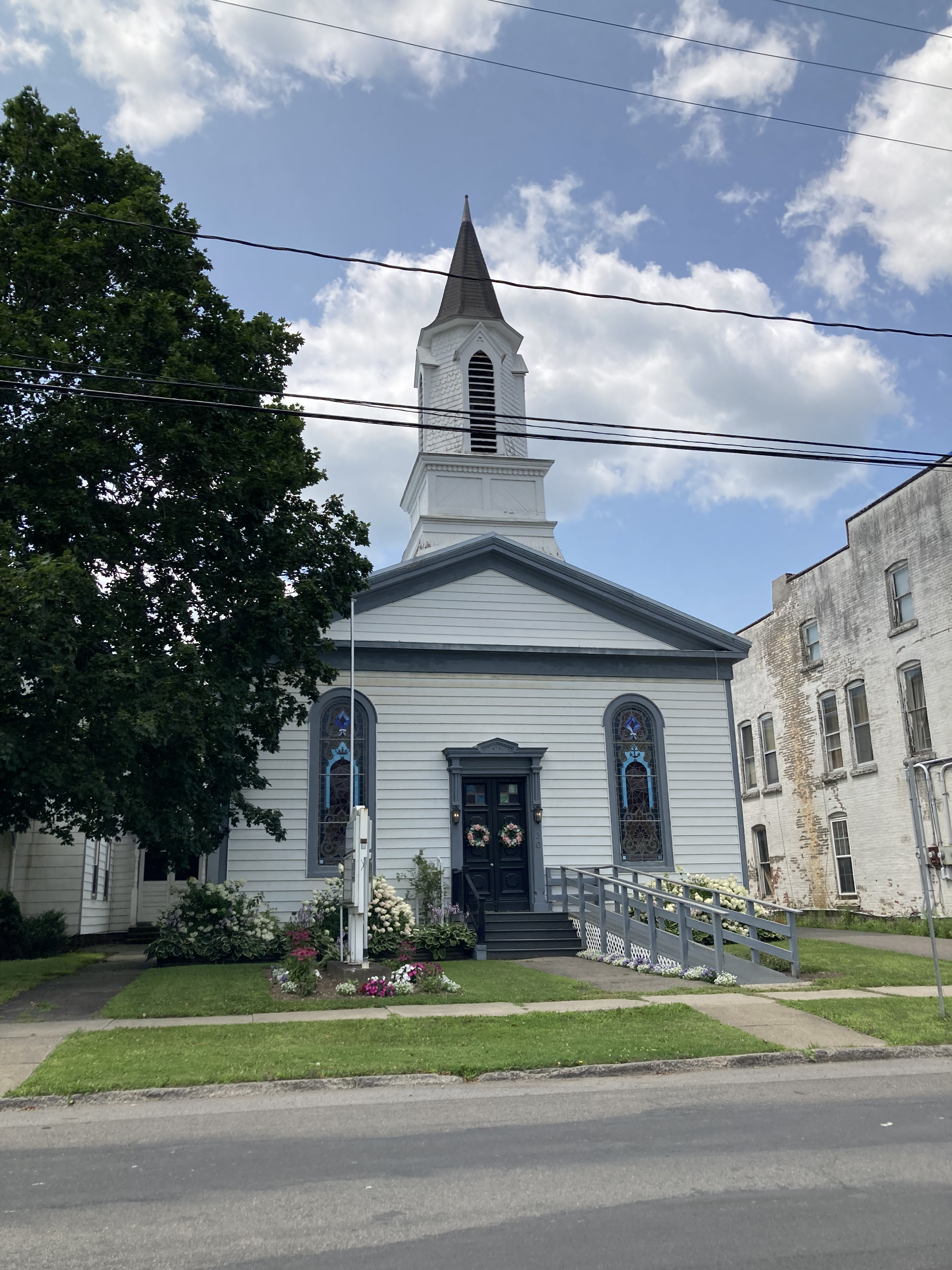
First Baptist Church

The first European-American settlers arrived c. 1790, after the American Revolutionary War.

The Town of New Berlin was founded by a partition of the Town of Norwich in 1807; it was named after Berlin, Germany. In 1821 the town changed its name to "Lancaster", but returned to "New Berlin" the next year. In 1853, part of the town was used to form the Town of Sherburne.

== Geography ==
According to the United States Census Bureau, the town of New Berlin has a total area of 46.6 square miles (120.6 km^{2}), of which 46.1 square miles (119.5 km^{2}) is land and 0.42 square miles (1.1 km^{2}), or 0.94%, is water.

The eastern town line, marked by the Unadilla River, is the border of Otsego County. The Unadilla is a southward-flowing tributary of the Susquehanna River.

New York State Route 8, a north-south highway, intersects New York State Route 80 north of New Berlin village at Five Corners. New York State Route 23 is an east-west highway running east from Norwich.

== Demographics ==
Historical population
Census	Pop.	Note	%±
1820	2,366		—
1830	2,643		11.7%
1840	3,086		16.8%
1850	2,562		−17.0%
1860	2,617		2.1%
1870	2,460		−6.0%
1880	2,572		4.6%
1890	2,427		−5.6%
1900	2,525		4.0%
1910	2,328		−7.8%
1920	2,104		−9.6%
1930	2,123		0.9%
1940	2,112		−0.5%
1950	2,359		11.7%
1960	2,633		11.6%
1970	2,823		7.2%
1980	3,025		7.2%
1990	3,046		0.7%
2000	2,803		−8.0%
2010	2,682		−4.3%
2019 (est.)	2,510	▼	−6.4%
U.S. Decennial Census

As of the census of 2000, there were 2,803 people, 1,083 households, and 737 families residing in the town. The population density was 60.4 inhabitants per square mile (23.3/km^{2}). There were 1,358 housing units at an average density of 29.3 per square mile (11.3/km^{2}). The racial makeup of the town was 98.14% White, 0.36% Black or African American, 0.14% Native American, 0.14% Asian, 0.04% Pacific Islander, 0.25% from other races, and 0.93% from two or more races. Hispanic or Latino of any race were 1.21% of the population.

There were 1,083 households, out of which 32.0% had children under the age of 18 living with them, 55.3% were married couples living together, 9.1% had a female householder with no husband present, and 31.9% were non-families. 26.4% of all households were made up of individuals, and 13.8% had someone living alone who was 65 years of age or older. The average household size was 2.51 and the average family size was 2.96.

In the town, the population was spread out, with 25.6% under the age of 18, 5.6% from 18 to 24, 26.5% from 25 to 44, 25.4% from 45 to 64, and 17.0% who were 65 years of age or older. The median age was 40 years. For every 100 females, there were 89.6 males. For every 100 females age 18 and over, there were 86.9 males.

The median income for a household in the town was $31,875, and the median income for a family was $40,000. Males had a median income of $27,411 versus $21,348 for females. The per capita income for the town was $16,546. About 10.5% of families and 16.1% of the population were below the poverty line, including 23.8% of those under age 18 and 10.6% of those age 65 or over.

== Communities and locations in the town ==
- Amblerville – hamlet northwest of South New Berlin.
- Chenango Lake – hamlet in the western part of the town, adjacent to a lake of the same name.
- Chenango Lake – lake located by the hamlet of Chenango Lake.
- Davis Crossing – hamlet south of New Berlin village on NY-8.
- Five Corners – hamlet in the northeastern corner of the town, north of New Berlin village.
- Holmesville – hamlet at the southern tip of the town, south of South New Berlin on Route 8.
- Hunts Pond State Park – former state park in the east-central part of the town, managed since 2011 as part of Hunts Pond State Forest.
- New Berlin – village located in the northeastern part of the town on NY-8. Its eastern border is the east town line and the Unadilla River.
- Mill Brook Reservoir – lake located west of the village of New Berlin.
- New Berlin Center – former community by the eastern town line.
- Sages Crossing – hamlet near the eastern town line on NY-8.
- South New Berlin – hamlet near the southern end of the town on NY-8.
- Unidilla – Motocross track since 1970

== Notable people ==
- Helen A. Manville, poet, litterateur
- Anson Burlingame, lawyer, congressman, abolitionist, diplomat

== Education ==
- Unadilla Valley Central School
- Unadilla Valley High School
