= North Brookfield, New York =

- Hamlet
- Location within New York Location within the United States
- Coordinates: 42°51′01″N 75°23′27″W
- Country: United States
- State: New York
- County: Madison
- Town: Brookfield
- Elevation: 1,299 ft (396 m)
- Time zone: UTC-5 (Eastern (EST))
  - Summer (DST): UTC-4 (EDT)
- ZIP code: 13418
- Area codes: 315 & 680
- GNIS feature ID: 958735

North Brookfield is a hamlet in Madison County, New York, United States. The community is 8 miles (13 km) east-northeast of Hamilton. North Brookfield has a post office with ZIP code 13418.

== Notable people ==
Painter Deborah Goldsmith was born in North Brookfield. The prominent twentieth-century war correspondent Maurice Hindus attended high school there, and maintained a second home in the village until the end of his life.
