= Unadilla Valley High School =

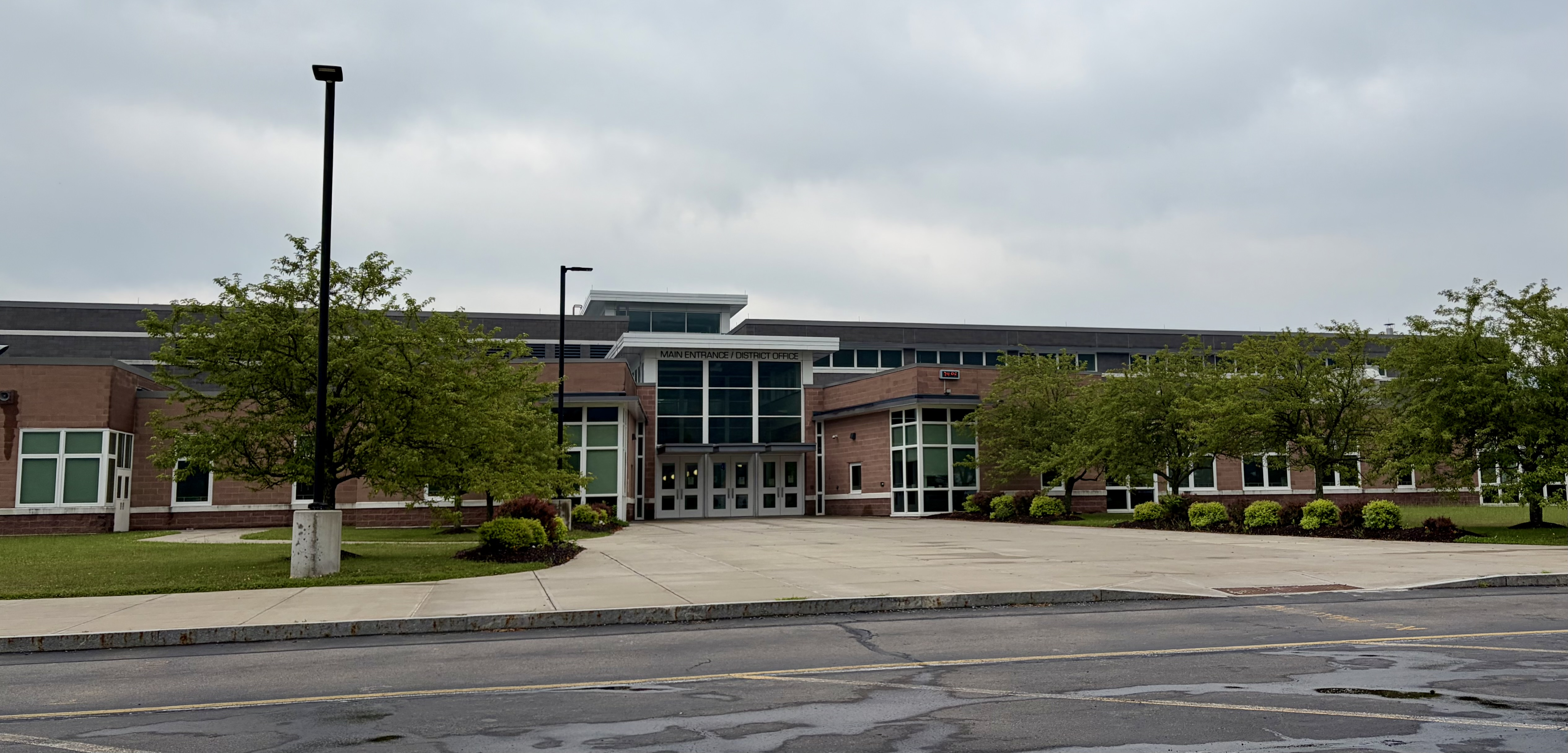
- The main entrance of Unadilla Valley Central School

Location
- 4238 State Highway 8 New Berlin, New York 13411; United States
- 42.5814°N 75.3349°W

Information
- Type: Public
- School district: Unadilla Valley Central School District
- NCES School ID: 360001901976
- Principal: Kim Murray
- Teaching staff: 30.27 (on an FTE basis)
- Grades: 3-12
- Gender: Co-ed
- Enrollment: 342 (2023-2024)
- Student to teacher ratio: 11.30
- Campus: Rural: Distant
- Colors: Purple, Gold and Black
- Mascot: Storm
- Website: www.uvstorm.org/page/about-unadilla-valley-secondary-school

Unadilla Valley High School is a public high school located in New Berlin, Chenango County, New York, U.S.A., and is the only high school operated by the Unadilla Valley Central School District.
