= Sidney (village), New York =

Sidney, New York
- Village
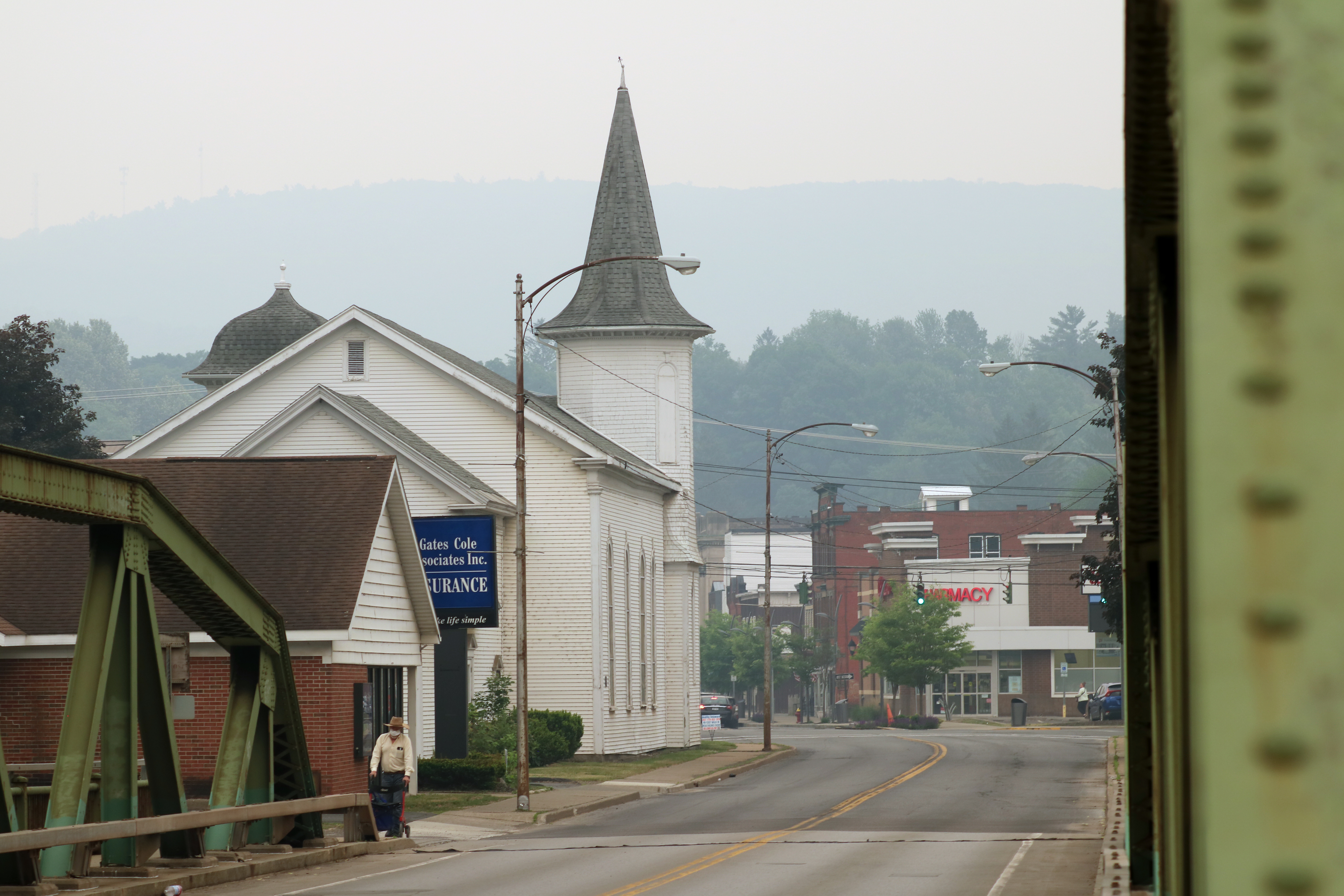
- A view of Main Street in the village of Sidney, Delaware County, New York.

- Location within the state of New York
- Coordinates: 42°18′29″N 75°23′47″W
- Country: United States
- State: New York
- County: Delaware
- Town: Sidney

Area
  - Total: 2.42 sq mi (6.28 km^{2})
  - Land: 2.38 sq mi (6.16 km^{2})
  - Water: 0.042 sq mi (0.11 km^{2})
- Elevation: 991 ft (302 m)

Population (2020)
  - Total: 3,697
  - Density: 1,553.4/sq mi (599.79/km^{2})
- Time zone: UTC-5 (Eastern (EST))
  - Summer (DST): UTC-4 (EDT)
- ZIP code: 13838
- Area code: 607
- FIPS code: 36-67334
- GNIS feature ID: 0965212
- Website: villageofsidney.org

Sidney is a village in Delaware County, New York, United States. The population was 3,900 at the 2010 census. The village is in the western part of the town of Sidney.

== History ==
The area now known as Sidney was inhabited by the Husatunnuk prior to its "purchase" from Goldsboro Banyar, of Albany, in 1771 by Rev. William Johnston, Presbyterian, born in Dublin, Ireland. The town was then called "Johnston" settlement until its renaming in 1801. The village was named for Admiral Sir Sidney Smith.

It is located nearly equidistant from Oneonta to the northeast, in the direction of the state capital Albany, and Binghamton to the southwest via I-88. Its position on the Susquehanna River makes it witness to the annual General Clinton Canoe Regatta.

The largest local employer today is Amphenol followed by Keith Clark though the latter is reported to be closing.

Its local hospital, now part of Bassett A.O. Fox Hospital – Tri-Town Campus, has been closed except for the daytime critical care center. Two other outpatient clinics are also present nearby.

The town continues to maintain its own local schools, library, EMS and fire district.

Pioneer Cemetery and the Sidney Historic District are listed on the National Register of Historic Places.

In June 2006, Sidney, along with other parts of New York and Pennsylvania, was hit by severe flooding. Carr's Creek washed out a 50-foot-long (15 m) section of Interstate 88 east of Sidney. At around 6:20 am on Wednesday, June 28, two trucks from different directions drove into the chasm, apparently unaware of it, killing both drivers. David Swingle, 42, of Waverly, New York, who was driving westbound, was identified shortly after the accident. The eastbound trucker was Patrick O'Connell, 55, of Lisbon, Maine. His body was found downstream several days after the water receded.

The New York State Department of Transportation finished preliminary repairs on I-88 by the end of 2006. Additional construction was completed within the next year due to the settling of the highway.

The village itself was also flooded, particularly the westernmost part of the town on the south side of the Susquehanna River. Hardest hit were parts of Willow, Maple, Oak, Winegard, Bridge and River streets, some of which took on over 4 feet (1.2 m) of muddy water during the flood. Many other areas were also affected. The entire downtown area north of the railroad tracks was evacuated because of the rising levels of the Susquehanna River.

== Geography ==
Sidney is located at the western end of the town of Sidney at 42°18′29″N 75°23′47″W (42.308175, -75.396465), on the south side of the Susquehanna River. It is in the northwest corner of Delaware County, bordered by Otsego County to the north across the Susquehanna and by Chenango County to the west.

According to the United States Census Bureau, the village of Sidney has a total area of 2.4 square miles (6.2 km^{2}), of which 0.02 square miles (0.04 km^{2}), or 0.64%, is water.

Interstate 88 passes just south of the village, with access from Exit 9 (New York State Route 8). I-88 leads northeast 23 miles (37 km) to Oneonta and southwest 36 miles (58 km) to Binghamton. Route 8 leads north 62 miles (100 km) to Utica and south 21 miles (34 km) to Deposit.

== Demographics ==
Historical population
Census	Pop.	Note	%±
1890	1,358		—
1900	2,331		71.6%
1910	2,507		7.6%
1920	2,670		6.5%
1930	2,444		−8.5%
1940	3,012		23.2%
1950	4,815		59.9%
1960	5,157		7.1%
1970	4,789		−7.1%
1980	4,861		1.5%
1990	4,720		−2.9%
2000	4,068		−13.8%
2010	3,900		−4.1%
2020	3,697		−5.2%
U.S. Decennial Census

At the 2010 census, the population was 3,900 (1,835 males, 2,065 females). The median age was 41.5 years, with 6.6% of the population under 5 years and 3.5% of the population 85 years and over. The age range with the lowest percentage of the population was 80 to 84 years with 2.3%. The age range with the highest percentage of the population was 50 to 54 years with 7.7%.

The racial make-up was 96.1% White, 0.8% Black or African American, 0.1% Native American, 1.1% Asian, 0.0% Pacific Islander, 0.5% from other races, and 1.4% from two or more races. Hispanic or Latino of any race were 2.3% of the population.

There were 1,697 households (1,005 family households and 692 non-family households) in the village. The average household size was 2.28 and the average family size was 2.90. The U.S. Census Bureau uses the following definitions: "Family households" consist of a householder and one or more other people related to the householder by birth, marriage, or adoption. They do not include same-sex married couples even if the marriage was performed in a state issuing marriage certificates for same-sex couples. Same-sex couple households are included in the family households category if there is at least one additional person related to the householder by birth or adoption. Same-sex couple households with no relatives of the householder present are tabulated in nonfamily households. "Nonfamily households" consist of people living alone and households which do not have any members related to the householder.

At the 2000 census, there were 4,068 people, 1,748 households and 1,054 families residing in the village. The population density was 1,722.7 per square mile (665.1/km^{2}). There were 1,951 housing units at an average density of 826.2 per square mile (319.0/km^{2}). The racial make-up was 95.99% White, 0.91% Black or African American, 0.42% Native American, 0.96% Asian, 0.02% Pacific Islander, 0.34% from other races and 1.35% from two or more races. Hispanic or Latino of any race were 1.52% of the population.

There were 1,748 households, of which 30.4% had children under the age of 18 living with them, 42.1% were married couples living together, 14.0% had a female householder with no husband present, and 39.7% were non-families. 33.8% of all households were made up of individuals, and 18.0% had someone living alone who was 65 years of age or older. The average household size was 2.29 and the average family size was 2.92.

25.8% of the population were under the age of 18, 7.2% from 18 to 24, 24.6% from 25 to 44, 22.9% from 45 to 64 and 19.5% who were 65 years of age or older. The median age was 40 years. For every 100 females, there were 86.7 males. For every 100 females age 18 and over, there were 82.5 males.

The median household income was $27,411 and the median family income was $31,734. Males had a median income of $28,596 and females $23,125. The per capita income was $15,123. About 15.4% of families and 18.5% of the population were below the poverty line, including 27.8% of those under age 18 and 12.9% of those age 65 or over.

== Notable people ==
- Lt. Col. Evans Carlson, US Marine Corps, leader of "Carlson's Rangers" in World War II
- Edward Howell, former US congressman
