= Leonardsville, New York =

- Hamlet
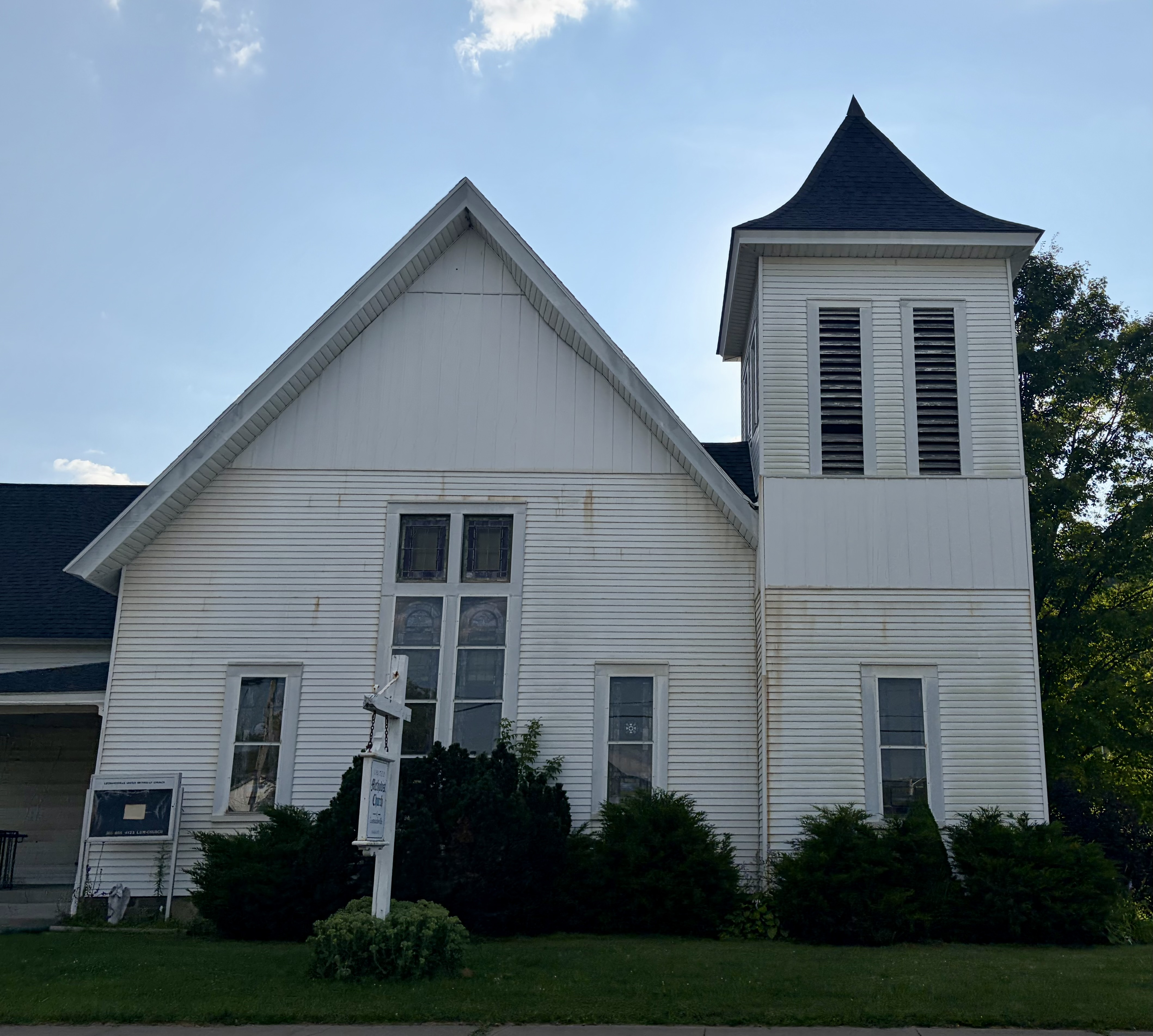
- Leonardsville United Methodist Church on Route 8

- Location within New York Location within the United States
- Coordinates: 42°48′33″N 75°15′10″W
- Country: United States
- State: New York
- County: Madison
- Town: Brookfield
- Elevation: 1,168 ft (356 m)

Population (2010)
  - Total: 243
- Time zone: UTC-5 (Eastern (EST))
  - Summer (DST): UTC-4 (EDT)
- ZIP code: 13364
- GNIS feature ID: 955217

Leonardsville is a hamlet on the Unadilla River in the Town of Brookfield in Madison County, New York, United States. A portion of it does also extend into the Town of Plainfield in Otsego County, New York, United States.

The community started as a number of small factories deriving power from a dam on the Unadilla River during the first decade of the 19th century. These were known locally as the shops and included a scythe and hoe factory, a blacksmith shop, a grist mill, a saw mill, a horse rake factory and wagon shop, and a foundry and machine shop.

As with many small communities, Leonardsville was given its name by the Post Office Department, which in this case named if after Reuben Leonard who, in his early years, ran a local grocery and dry goods business that became a convenient location to drop off mail for local residents.

In 1856, the grist mill, saw mill and agricultural implement factory were destroyed by fire, but were rebuilt immediately. Soon after that, the shops were purchased by the Babcock family who operated them until the 1930s, employing at their peak over 100 workers. Until the 1950s, when the manufacturing shops closed, Leonardsville was a stop on the Unadilla Valley Railway, had a milk station (now a recycling center) and a feed store. None of the manufacturing buildings remain.

Leonardsville had its own kindergarten through 12th grade central school until 1969, when the district merged with Bridgewater and West Winfield, creating the Mount Markham Central School district. The building was one of the new district's elementary schools until 2001, but now is used for specialized educational programs.

The Wheeler House Complex was listed on the National Register of Historic Places in 1983.

Population reportedly decreased from 243 in the 2010 census to 110 in 2016, with an average age of 52.
