= Unadilla Valley Central School =

Public school in New York

Coordinates: 42°34′53.1″N 75°20′5.3″W

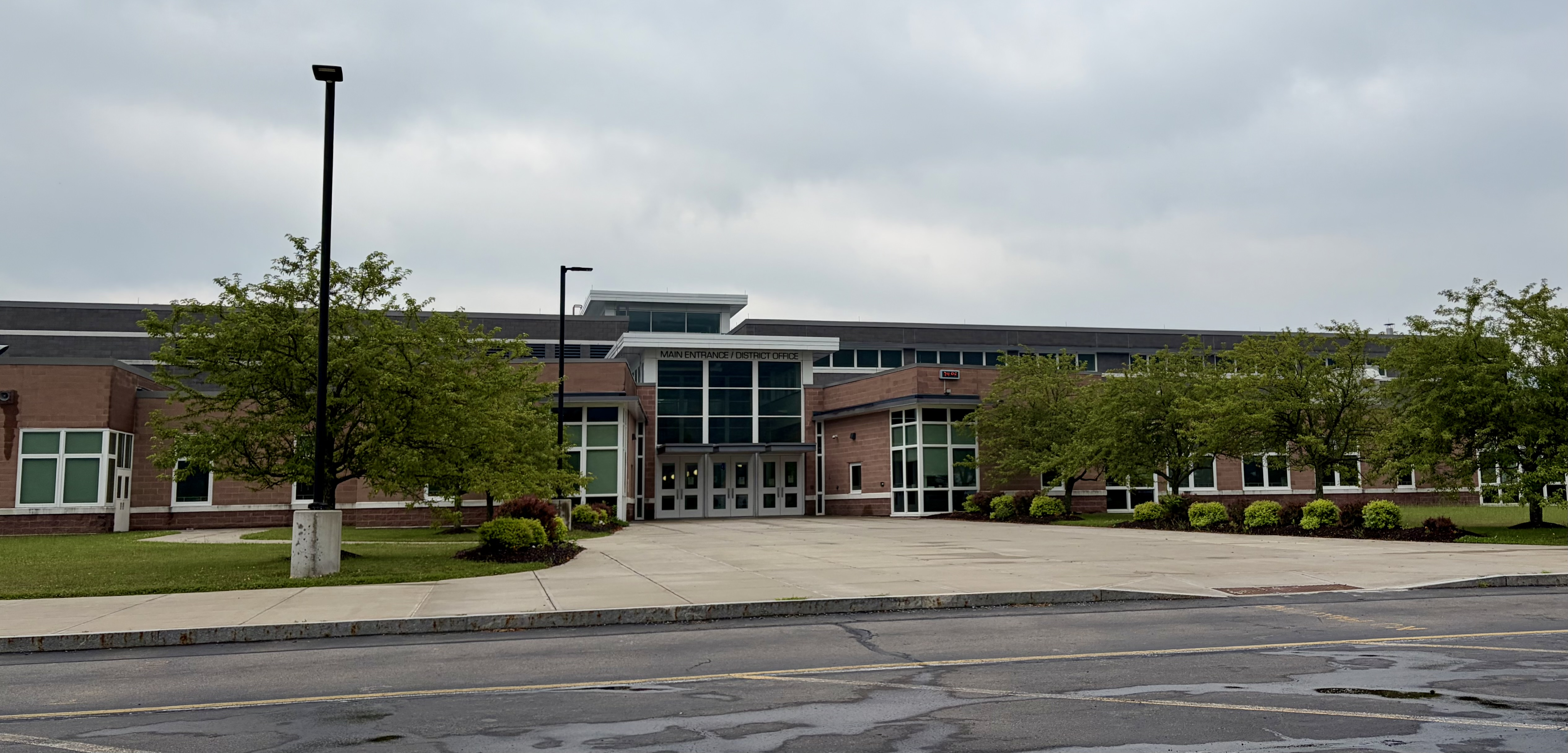
Unadilla Valley Central School and district offices

Unadilla Valley Central School is a public school district operating in New Berlin, Chenango County, New York. Schools include Unadilla Valley Elementary School and Unadilla Valley Jr/Sr High School. Colors, Purple, Gold, Black
