= Pioneer Cemetery (Sidney, New York) =

Historic cemetery in Delaware County, New York, US

- U.S. National Register of Historic Places
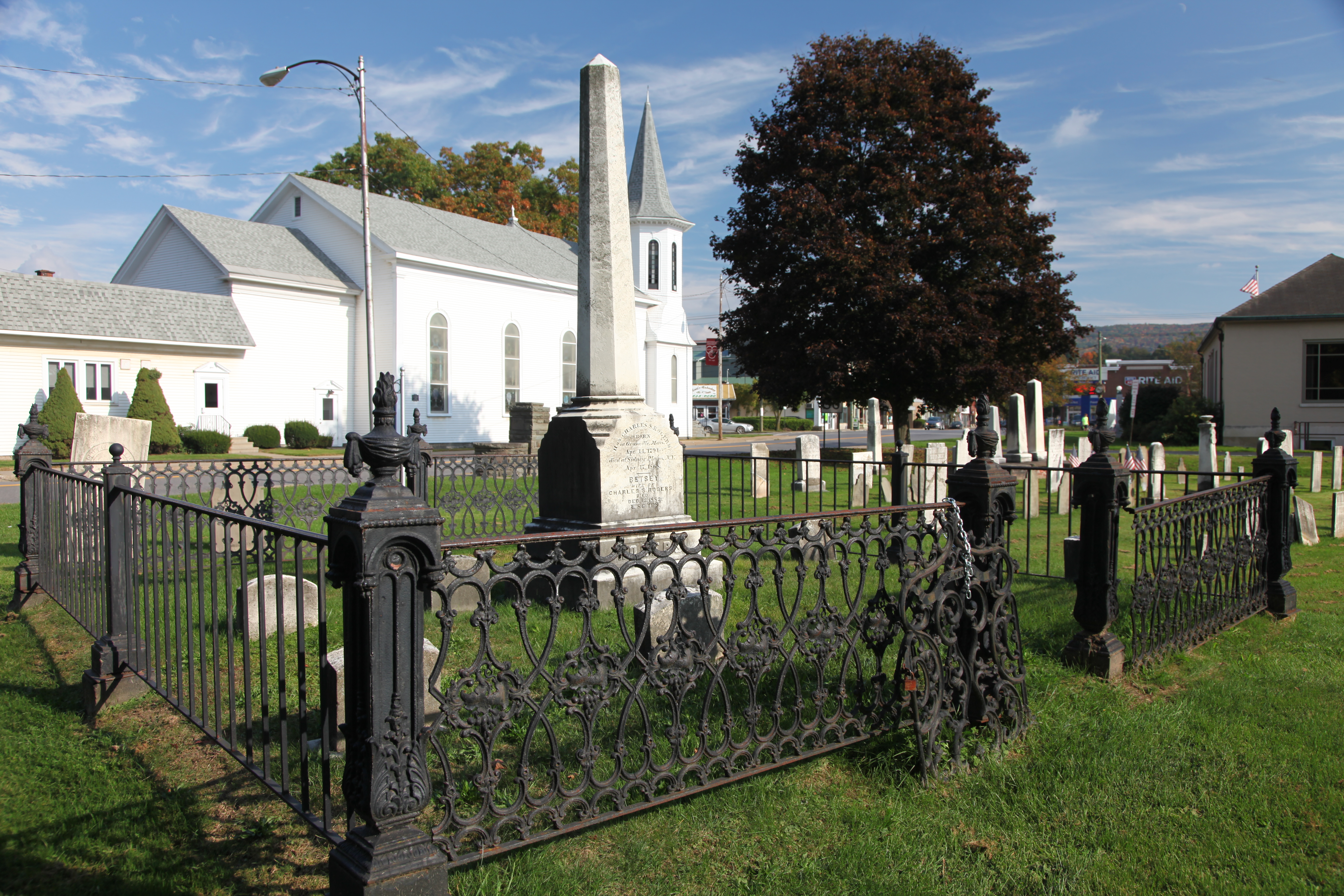
- A monument in the cemetery

- Location within New York Location within the United States
- Location: Main St., Sidney, New York
- Coordinates: 42°18′59″N 75°23′37″W
- Area: less than one acre
- Architect: Stewart, J.W.; et al.
- NRHP reference No.: 07000754
- Added to NRHP: July 24, 2007

Pioneer Cemetery is a historic cemetery located at Sidney in Delaware County, New York, United States. It is a community burial ground with the earliest recorded interment dated to 1787. Burials date from 1787 to 1890 and cemetery records indicate 275 burials.

It was listed on the National Register of Historic Places in 2007.

== Gallery ==
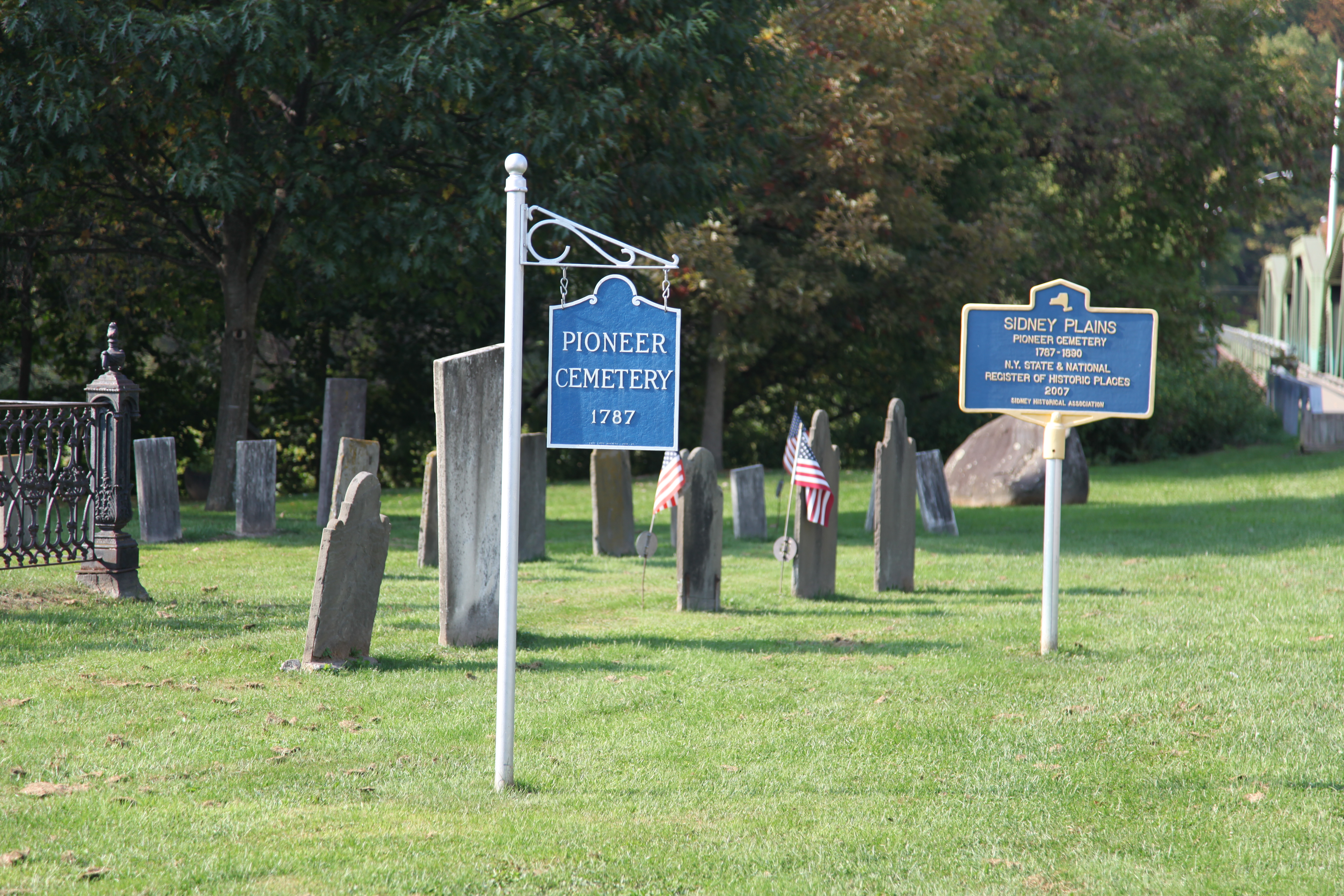
Cemetery sign and historic marker

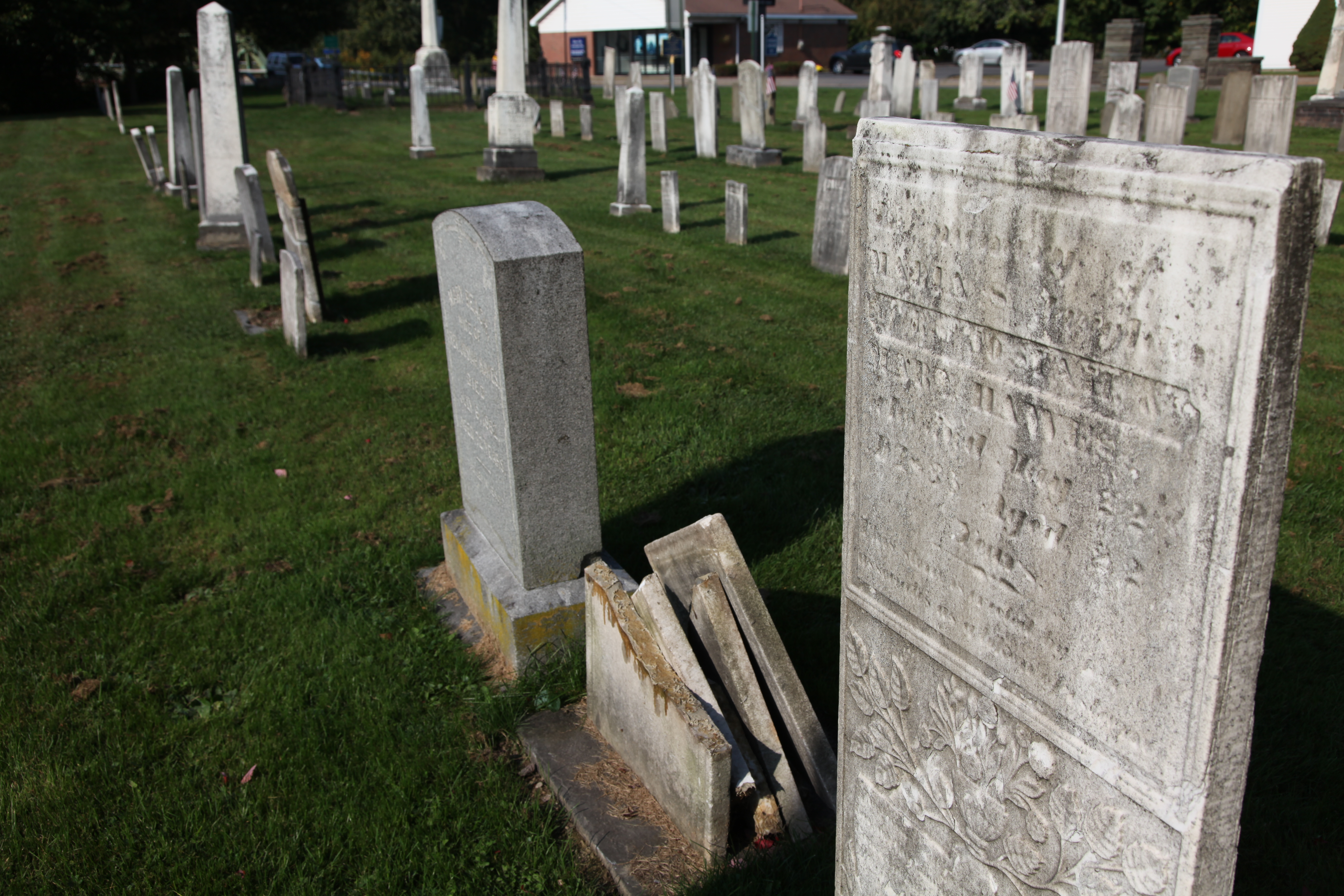
Gravestones in the cemetery

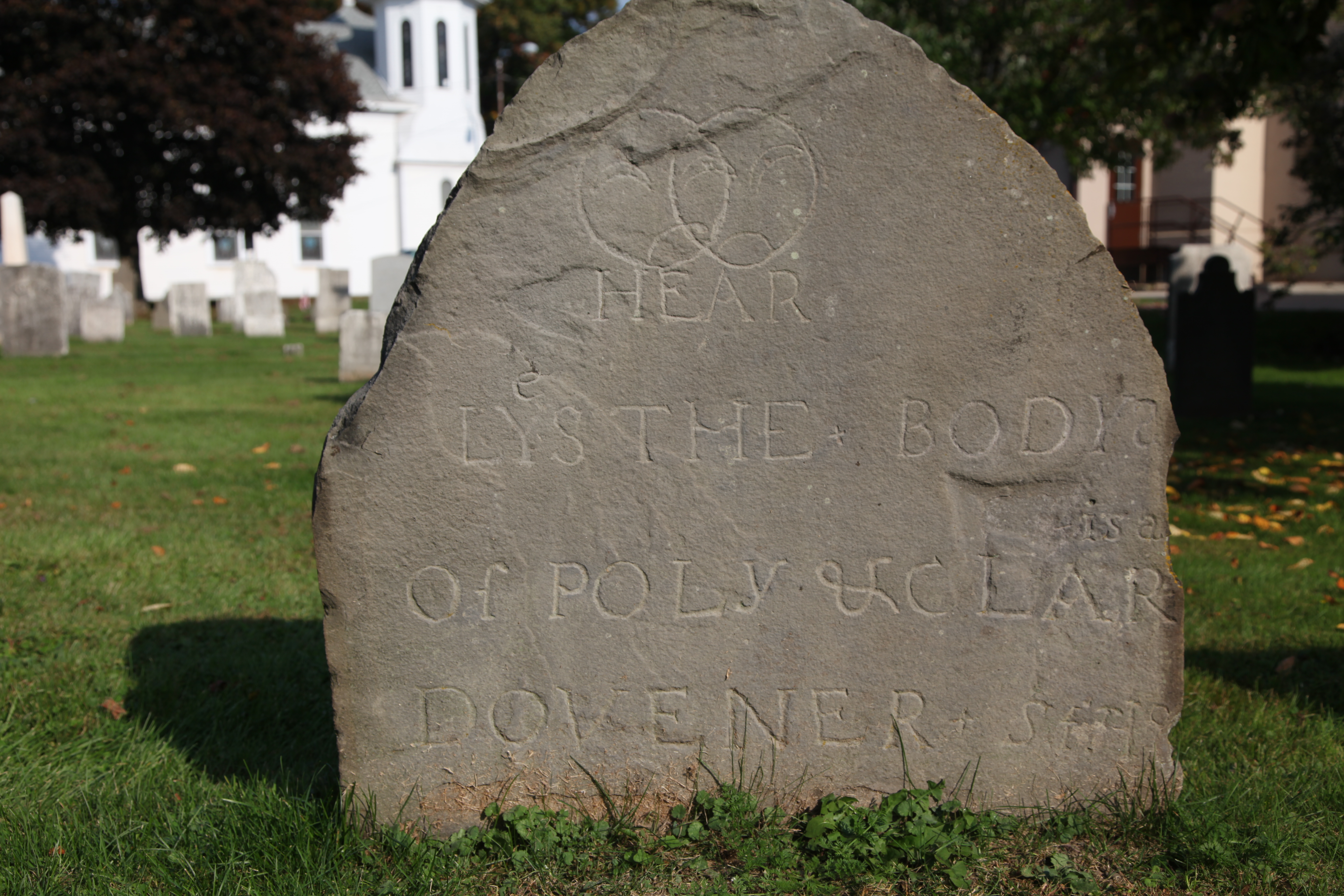
Gravestone in the cemetery

== See also ==
- National Register of Historic Places listings in Delaware County, New York
