= Millers Mills, New York =

- Hamlet
- Location within New York Location within the United States
- Coordinates: 42°55′12″N 75°04′54″W
- Country: United States
- State: New York
- County: Herkimer
- Town: Columbia
- Elevation: 1,339 ft (408 m)
- Time zone: UTC-5 (Eastern (EST))
  - Summer (DST): UTC-4 (EDT)
- Area codes: 315/680

Millers Mills is a hamlet located in the Town of Columbia in Herkimer County, New York, United States.

The hamlet was founded by Andrew Miller and family, who built grist and saw mills there. He left all his sons 40 acre sections in the surrounding area for their homes.
