= Unadilla Forks, New York =

Unadilla Forks
- hamlet and CDP
- Nickname: the "Forks"
- Location within the state of New York
- Coordinates: 42°50′41″N 75°14′32″W
- Country: United States
- State: New York
- County: Madison

Area
  - Total: 4.99 sq mi (12.92 km^{2})
- Time zone: UTC-5 (Eastern (EST))
  - Summer (DST): UTC-4 (EDT)

Unadilla Forks is a hamlet (and census-designated place) in the Town of Plainfield in Otsego County, New York, United States, at the confluence of the two branches of the Unadilla River on the Otsego-Madison County border. As of the 2020 census, Unadilla Forks had a population of 257.

The Unadilla Forks School was listed on the National Register of Historic Places in 1998.
