= Unadilla River =

Unadilla River Tianadara
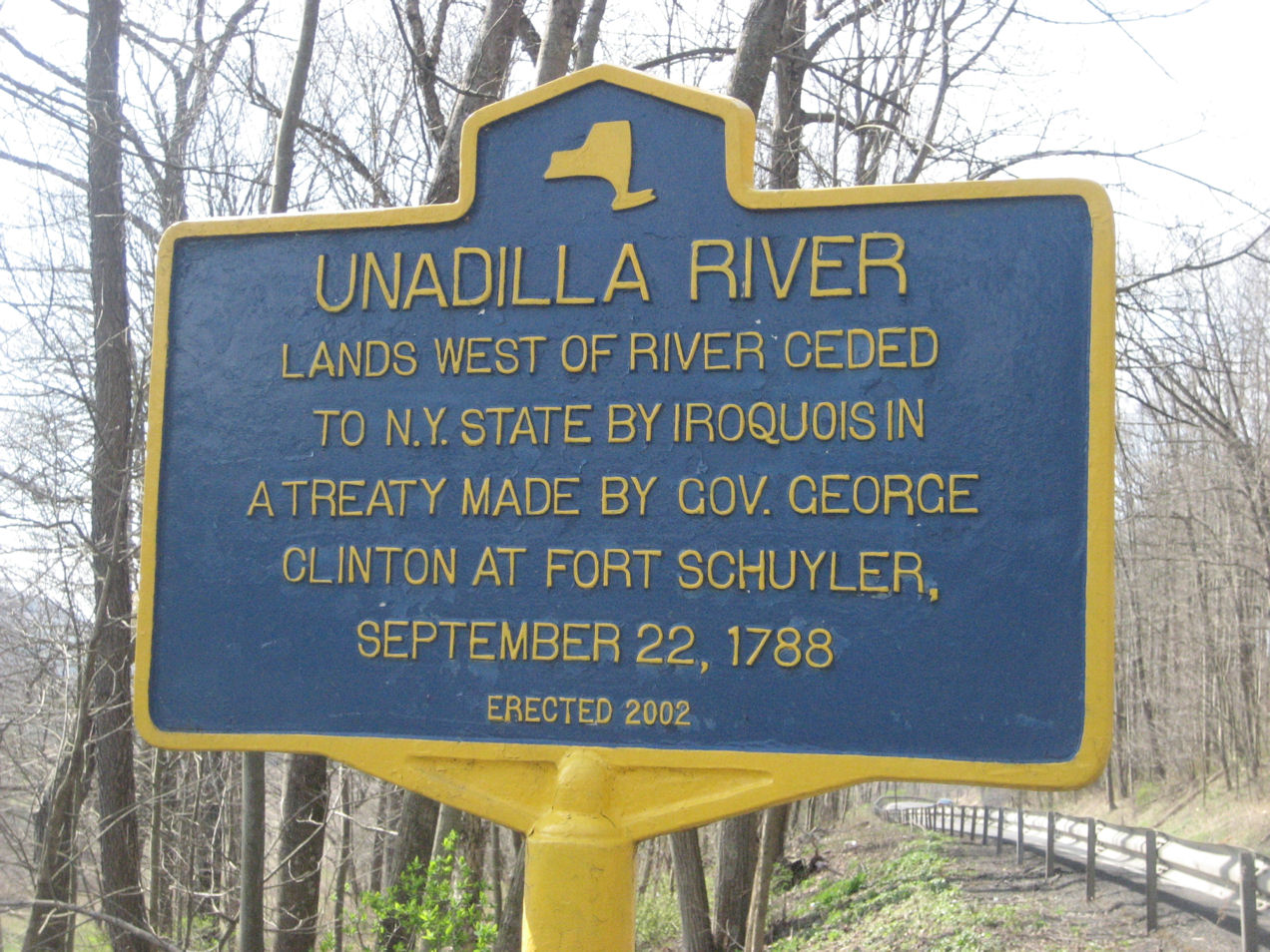
- Historic marker of the Unadilla River

- Location of the mouth of Unadilla River

Location
- Country: United States
- State: New York
- Region: Central New York

Physical characteristics
- Source
  - location: NE of Millers Mills
  - coordinates: 42°55′57″N 75°01′39″W
- Mouth: Susquehanna River
  - location: Sidney
  - coordinates: 42°19′00″N 75°24′36″W
  - elevation: 961 ft (293 m)
- Length: 71 mi (114 km)

Basin features
- Progression: Unadilla River → Susquehanna River → Chesapeake Bay → Atlantic Ocean
- Tributaries
  - left: Campbell Brook, Wharton Creek, Butternut Creek, Rogers Hollow Brook
  - right: North Winfield Creek, West Branch Unadilla River, Button Creek, Beaver Creek, Tallette Creek, Center Brook, Mill Brook, Great Brook, White Store Brook, Kent Brook, Guilford Creek, Peckham Brook

The Unadilla River is a 71-mile-long (114 km) river in the Central New York Region of New York State. The river begins northeast of the hamlet of Millers Mills and flows generally south to the village of Sidney, where it converges with the Susquehanna River, which drains into the Chesapeake Bay, a bay of the Atlantic Ocean.

Most of the length of the Unadilla forms the western border of Otsego County and the eastern borders of Chenango and Madison counties, all in New York. This border made up a significant portion of the Fort Stanwix Treaty Line of 1768. It was meant to establish the border for an Indian reserve, beyond which European-American settlers were not supposed to go. Settlers resented British efforts to control their movements, and continued to encroach on Native American territories.

== Branches ==
The Unadilla has two branches which join at Unadilla Forks on the Otsego-Madison County border.

- The main branch of the Unadilla, referred to as the Unadilla River, starts northeast of the hamlet of Millers Mills in southwestern Herkimer County.
- The West Branch Unadilla River starts a few miles north of Bridgewater in southeast Oneida County. This branch was known as Eghwagy Creek during the early 18th century.

== Tributaries ==
The Unadilla's tributaries, from north to south, include:

- Campbell Brook: from the east, near the Skaneateles Turnpike north of Leonardsville
- Button Creek: from the west, between Leonardsville and West Edmeston
- Beaver Creek: from the west, between South Brookfield and Columbus Quarter
- Tallette Creek: from the west, near Columbus Quarter
- Center Brook: from the west, at New Berlin
- Wharton Creek: from the east, at New Berlin
- Butternut Creek: from the east, near Mount Upton
- Guilford Creek: from the west, north of Sidney

== Alternate names and spellings ==
Unadilla has had various spellings and alternate names, particularly in the 18th century:

- Che-on-a-dill-ha: Oneida dialect
- Teyonadelhouogh: Gideon Hawley, Journey to Broome County, Oquaga (Onaheghgwage), 1753
- Tiona-derha: Guy Johnson's 1768 map
- Tienaderha: Guy Johnson's 1771 map and Southeir's 1779 map
- Tianaderaha: Surveyor-General, Simeon De Witt's map c. 1790
- Tianaderha: Fort Stanwix Treaty of 1768
- Tunadilla: Common spelling 18th century correspondence
- Susquehannock: Vaughan's 18th century Chorographical Map

== See also ==
- List of New York rivers
