= New York State Route 235 =

Highway in New York

New York State Route 235
- Map of Southern Tier in New York with NY 235 highlighted in red

Route information
- Maintained by NYSDOT
- Length: 9.16 mi (14.74 km)
- Existed: 1930–present

Major junctions
- South end: NY 7 in Colesville
- North end: NY 41 / NY 206 in Coventry

Location
- Country: United States
- State: New York
- Counties: Broome, Chenango

Highway system
- New York Highways; Interstate; US; State; Reference; Parkways
← NY 234	→ NY 236

New York State Route 235 (NY 235) is a north–south state highway in the Southern Tier of New York in the United States. Most of the route is in Chenango County; however, the southernmost 0.5 miles (0.8 km) is in Broome County. The southern terminus of NY 235 is at an intersection with NY 7 in the town of Colesville and its northern terminus is at a junction with the conjoined routes of NY 41 and NY 206 in the town of Coventry.

== Route description ==
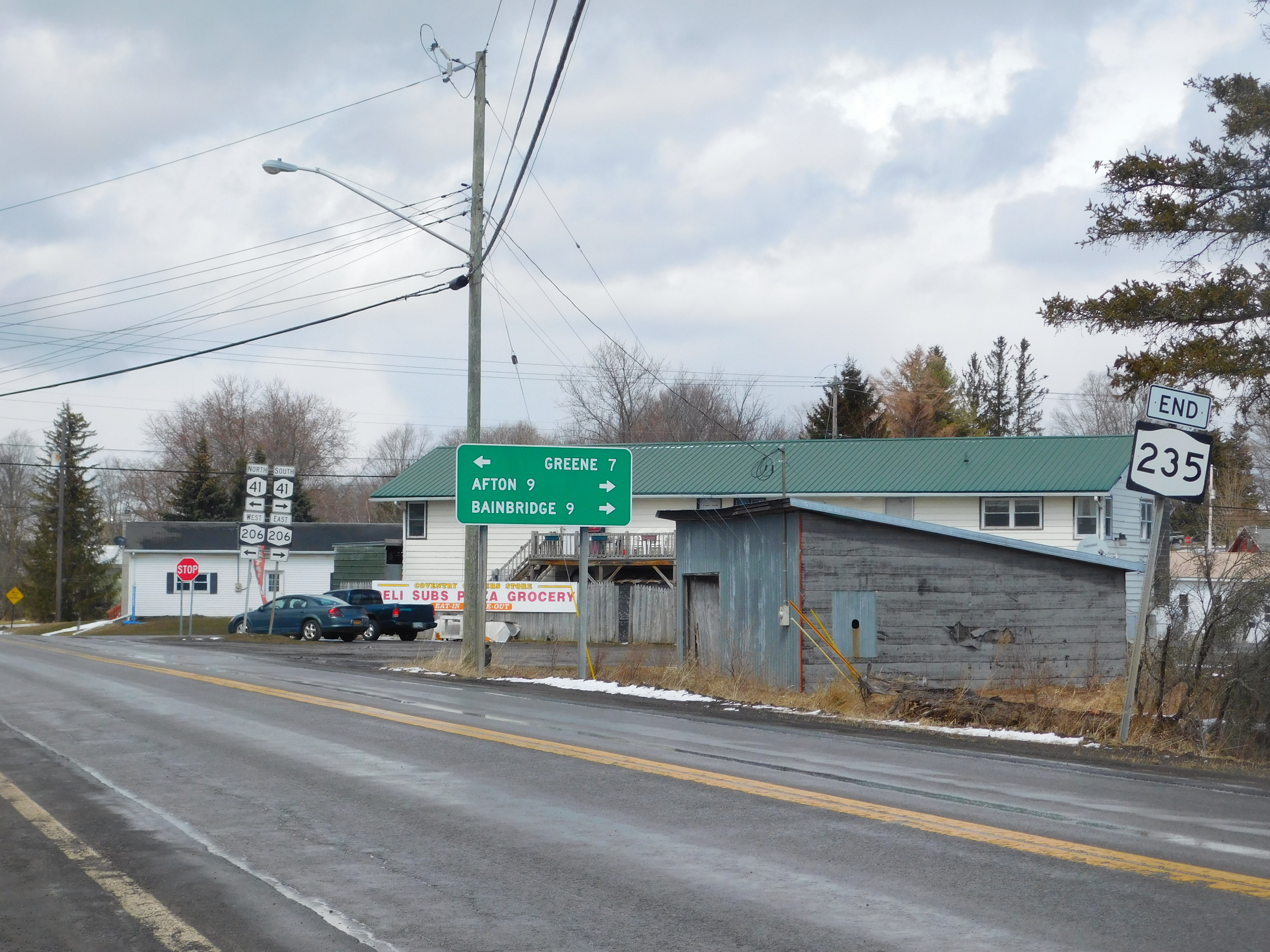
NY 235 approaching its northern terminus at NY 41 and NY 206 in Coventry

NY 235 begins at an intersection with NY 7 alongside the Wylie Brook in Colesville. The route progresses northward, crossing under a railroad viaduct, crossing the county line out of Broome County into Chenango County. After crossing the county line, NY 235 enters the town of Afton, passing some residences and paralleling the aforementioned brook. The route remains mainly rural, winding northward through Afton, passing some homes near Davey-Mendenhall Road. Continuing brook-side, NY 235, entering the town of Coventry, intersects with Ives Road before crossing over Wiley Brook just north of it. Ives Road soon turns to the northwest, merging back into NY 235. The rural backdrop does not change along the roadway, crossing over Wiley Brook once more. Davey-Mendenhall Road merges in once again further north, where the route turns to the northwest, intersecting with County Route 30 (CR 30; Smith Road). The route makes a bend to the northeast, passing several farmlands, before entering downtown Coventry, where NY 235 intersects with NY 41 and NY 206. This intersection serves as the northern terminus of NY 235.

== History ==
The entirety of NY 235 was assigned as part of the 1930 renumbering of state highways in New York. At the time, it was routed on what is now Ives Road through the town of Coventry. In the early 1930s, NY 235 was straightened out to use its current alignment as part of a total reconstruction of the 9-mile (14 km) route. Work on the route began c. 1932 and was completed by the following year.

== Major intersections ==
County	Location	mi	km	Destinations	Notes
Broome	Colesville	0.00	0.00	NY 7 – Afton, Binghamton	Southern terminus
Chenango	Coventry	9.16	14.74	NY 41 / NY 206 – Greene, Afton, Bainbridge	Northern terminus
1.000 mi = 1.609 km; 1.000 km = 0.621 mi
