= Coventry, New York =

- Town
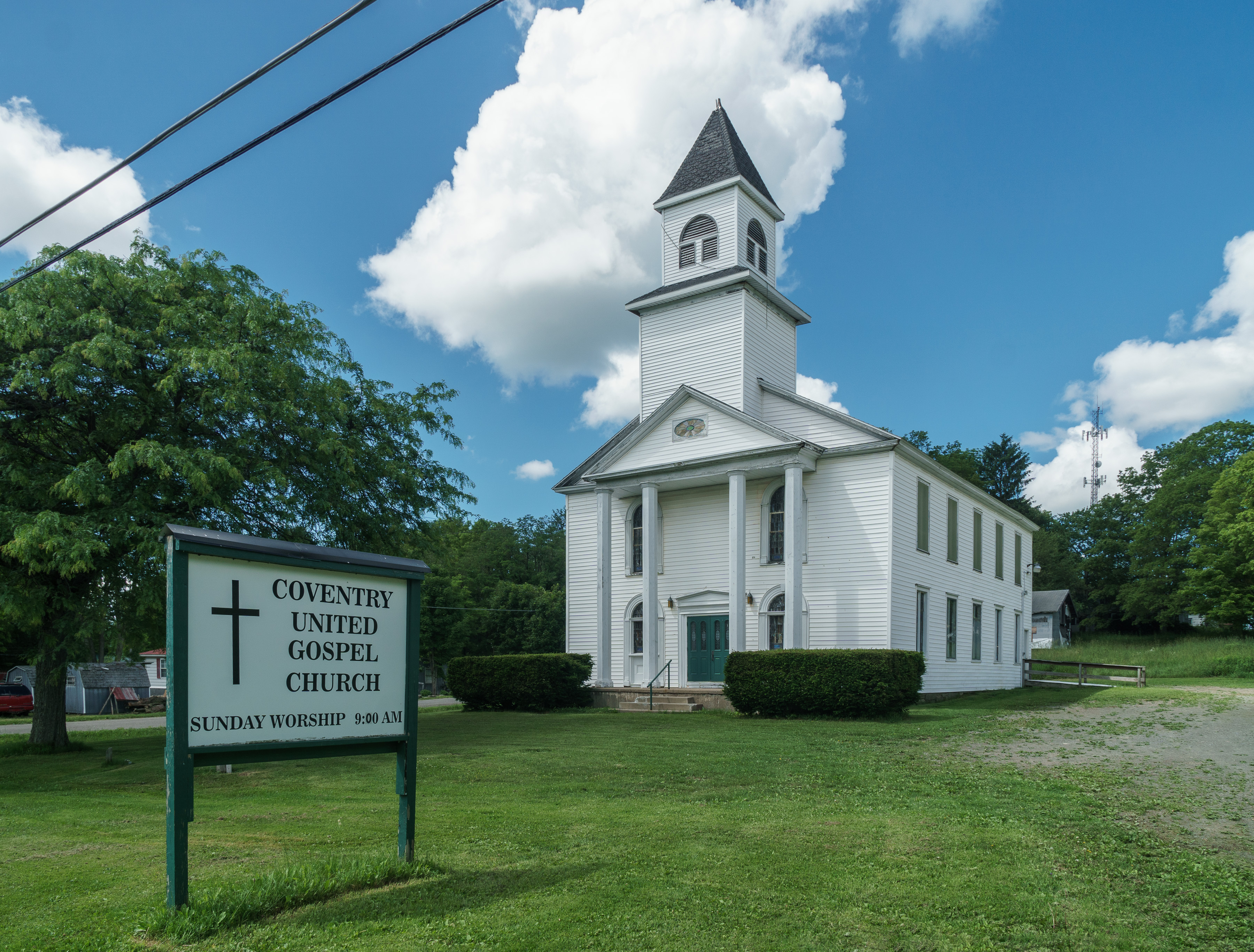
- Coventry United Gospel Church

- Location within the state of New York
- Coordinates: 42°17′51″N 75°37′41″W
- Country: United States
- State: New York
- County: Chenango

Government
  - Type: Town Council
  - Town Supervisor: John M. Phelan, Sr. (R)
  - Town Council: Members' List: • Marion L. Ireland (R); • Harvey E. Fletcher (R); • Robert E. Boudreau (R); • George Broeg (R)

Area
  - Total: 48.68 sq mi (126.09 km^{2})
  - Land: 48.51 sq mi (125.65 km^{2})
  - Water: 0.17 sq mi (0.43 km^{2})
- Elevation: 1,578 ft (481 m)

Population (2010)
  - Total: 1,655
  - Estimate (2016): 1,596
  - Density: 33/sq mi (12.7/km^{2})
- Time zone: UTC-5 (Eastern (EST))
  - Summer (DST): UTC-4 (EDT)
- ZIP Codes: 13730 Afton); 13733 (Bainbridge); 13778 (Greene); 13787 (Harpursville); 13830 (Oxford)
- Area code: 607
- FIPS code: 36-017-18619
- GNIS feature ID: 0978873
- Website: coventryny.com

Coventry is a town in Chenango County, New York, United States. The population was 1,655 at the 2010 census. The town is named after Coventry, Connecticut, by settlers from New England. Coventry is in the southern part of Chenango County and is northeast of Binghamton.

== History ==
The first settlement took place circa 1785 near the current Coventry village. Coventry was formed from the town of Greene in 1806. In 1843, the area of the town was increased from parts of Greene and the town of Oxford.

Due to poor soil conditions, dairy herding was prominent from the pioneer days, leading to five butter and cheese factories in the town at one time in the past.

District School 4 was listed on the National Register of Historic Places in 2004.

== Geography ==
According to the United States Census Bureau, the town has a total area of 48.9 square miles (126.6 km^{2}), of which 48.7 square miles (126.1 km^{2}) is land and 0.15 square miles (0.4 km^{2}), or 0.34%, is water.

Part of the southern town line is the border of Broome County.

Conjoined New York State Route 41 and New York State Route 206 intersect New York State Route 235, a north–south highway, at Coventry village.

== Demographics ==
Historical population
Census	Pop.	Note	%±
1820	1,431		—
1830	1,576		10.1%
1840	1,681		6.7%
1850	1,677		−0.2%
1860	1,671		−0.4%
1870	1,490		−10.8%
1880	1,317		−11.6%
1890	1,166		−11.5%
1900	987		−15.4%
1910	764		−22.6%
1920	733		−4.1%
1930	780		6.4%
1940	722		−7.4%
1950	796		10.2%
1960	859		7.9%
1970	974		13.4%
1980	1,271		30.5%
1990	1,517		19.4%
2000	1,589		4.7%
2010	1,655		4.2%
2016 (est.)	1,596		−3.6%
U.S. Decennial Census

As of the census of 2000, there were 1,589 people, 577 households, and 428 families residing in the town. The population density was 32.6 inhabitants per square mile (12.6/km^{2}). There were 757 housing units at an average density of 15.5 per square mile (6.0/km^{2}). The racial makeup of the town was 99.06% White, 0.25% African American, 0.19% Native American, 0.06% Asian, and 0.44% from two or more races. Hispanic or Latino of any race were 0.94% of the population.

There were 577 households, out of which 36.7% had children under the age of 18 living with them, 62.0% were married couples living together, 5.4% had a female householder with no husband present, and 25.8% were non-families. 19.8% of all households were made up of individuals, and 5.9% had someone living alone who was 65 years of age or older. The average household size was 2.75 and the average family size was 3.14.

In the town, the population was spread out, with 28.8% under the age of 18, 6.5% from 18 to 24, 30.9% from 25 to 44, 24.4% from 45 to 64, and 9.5% who were 65 years of age or older. The median age was 36 years. For every 100 females, there were 105.0 males. For every 100 females age 18 and over, there were 104.3 males.

The median income for a household in the town was $35,769, and the median income for a family was $38,906. Males had a median income of $30,272 versus $19,946 for females. The per capita income for the town was $14,807. About 10.7% of families and 14.9% of the population were below the poverty line, including 18.4% of those under age 18 and 10.0% of those age 65 or over.

== Notable person ==
- William Goodell, abolitionist

== Communities and locations in Coventry ==
- Blackesley Corner – A hamlet southeast of Coventry village and in the southeastern part of the town, located on County Road 30.
- Bowbell Hill – A location in the southwestern part of the town, marked by a hill by that name, once a community in the town.
- Coventry – The hamlet of Coventry is at the junction of NY-41 and NY-235.
- Coventryville – A hamlet east of Coventry village on NY-206. The District School 2 was listed on the National Register of Historic Places in 2004.

== International relations ==
=== Twin towns – sister cities ===
Coventry is twinned with:

- Coventry, United Kingdom
