= New York State Route 206 =

Highway in New York

New York State Route 206
- Map of south central New York with NY 206 highlighted in red

Route information
- Maintained by NYSDOT, Delaware County, and Sullivan County
- Length: 74.57 mi (120.01 km)
- Existed: 1930–present

Major junctions
- West end: NY 26 / NY 79 in Whitney Point
- NY 12 in Greene; NY 7 in Bainbridge; I-88 in Bainbridge; NY 8 in Masonville; NY 10 in Walton
- East end: Future I-86 / NY 17 in Rockland

Location
- Country: United States
- State: New York
- Counties: Broome, Chenango, Delaware, Sullivan

Highway system
- New York Highways; Interstate; US; State; Reference; Parkways
← NY 205	→ NY 207
← US 219	NY 219	→ US 220

New York State Route 206 (NY 206) is a 74.57-mile-long (120.01 km) state highway in the Southern Tier of New York in the United States. It runs through some lightly populated regions along the state's southern border, from Central New York to the Catskills. It begins near a busy intersection with Interstate 81 (I-81) at Whitney Point and runs east from there through Greene. The eastern terminus is located at a junction with NY 17 (future I-86) at Roscoe in Sullivan County. It is one of the longest three-digit routes in New York, and the only long one not associated with a two-digit route or a former U.S. Route. Yet due to its location it sees little traffic, although for much of its length it follows the route of a main 19th century thoroughfare, the Catskill Turnpike. It is primarily detour around Binghamton.

NY 206 was assigned as part of the 1930 renumbering of state highways in New York, but only from Bainbridge to Downsville. NY 206 was extended west to Whitney Point in the early 1940s; another extension in the late 1970s moved the route's eastern terminus to Roscoe. Prior to becoming NY 206, the Whitney Point–Greene segment was once New York State Route 219 and New York State Route 383 while the portion from Coventry to Bainbridge was previously New York State Route 218.

== Route description ==
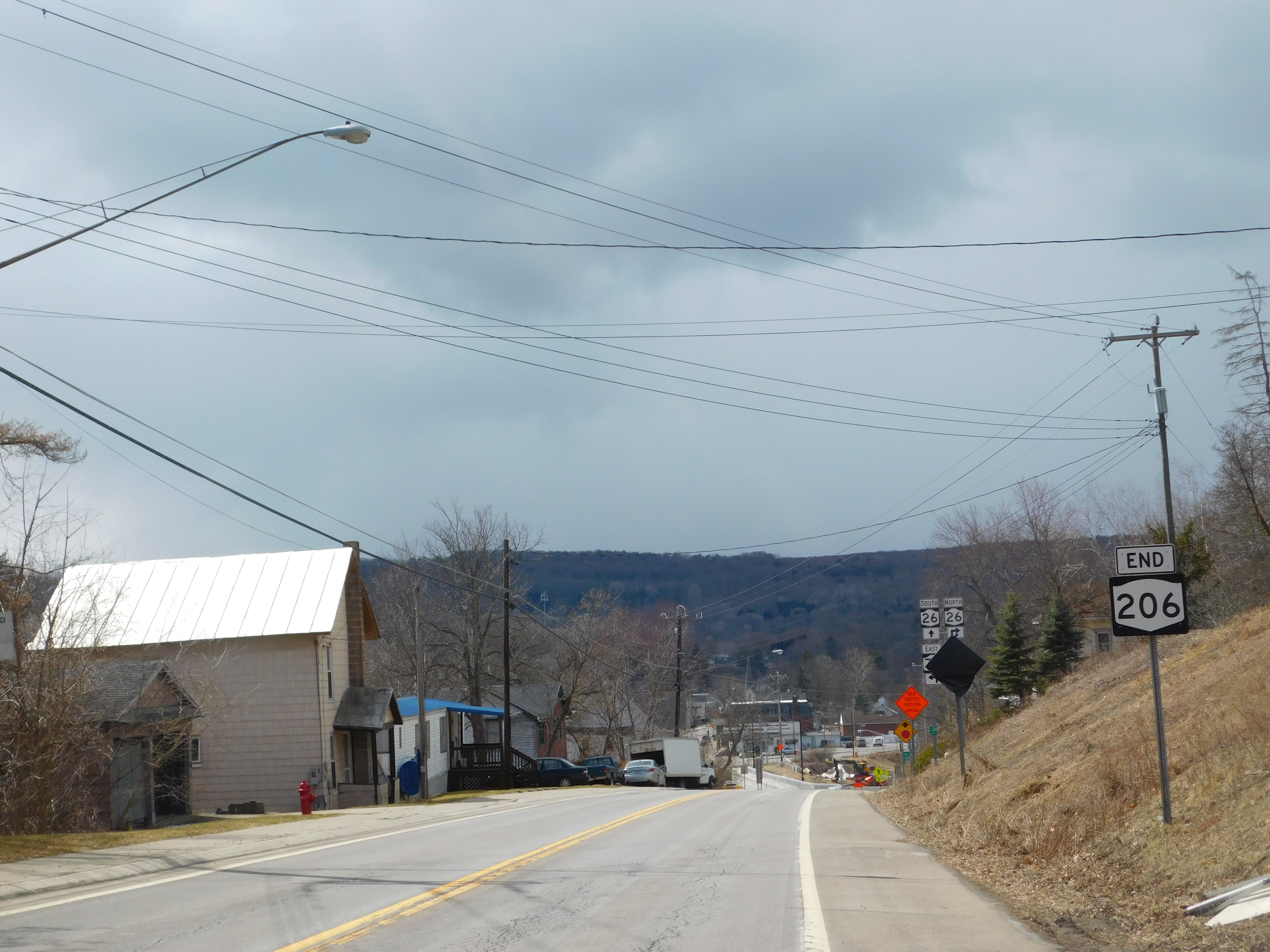
NY 206 in Whitney Point, at its western terminus

NY 206 begins at an intersection with NY 26 and NY 79 at the bank of the Tioughnioga River in Whitney Point. A two-lane road known as Main Street, NY 206 parallels NY 79 as it progresses eastward, leaving Whitney Point for the town of Triangle. NY 206 enters the hamlet of Triangle, where it meets a junction with County Route 133 (CR 133, named South Street) and CR 137 (North Street). East of Triangle, the road crosses the Chenango County line and enters the hamlet of Barnes Corners.

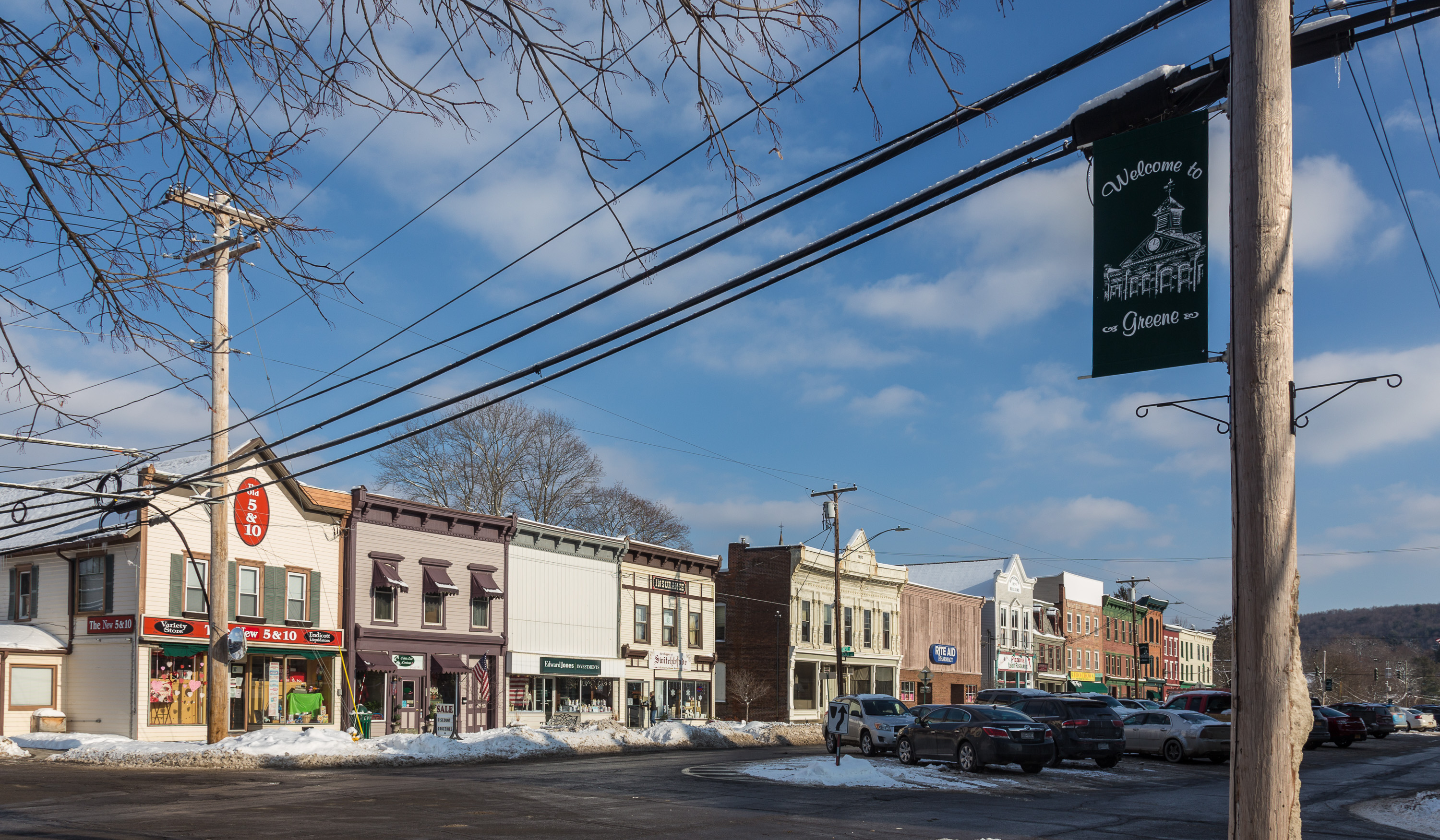
206 becomes Genesee Street in downtown Greene

Through the town of Greene, NY 206 remains a two-lane rural road, reaching the hamlet of Genegantslet at the junction with CR 2. NY 206 turns southeast at Genegantslet and enters the village of Greene, where it becomes Genesee Street at a junction with NY 12 and NY 41. Becoming concurrent with NY 41, the route runs southeast through downtown Greene, crossing the Chenango River and changes names to Washington Street. At the junction with CR 32, NY 206 and NY 41 turn northeast back into the town of Greene, soon settling into an eastward alignment out of the village.

NY 206 and NY 41 enter the town of Coventry, where it reaches the northern terminus of NY 235 at the hamlet of Coventry. Continuing east through the town, the routes cross a junction with CR 27, where NY 41 turns southeast. NY 206 continues east through Coventry, crossing into the town of Bainbridge. At the junction with CR 17, the route begins a slow progression to the southeast, entering the village of Bainbridge. Known as East Main Street, NY 206 runs southeast through the village, crossing a junction with NY 7 (South Main Street).

NY 206 crosses the Susquehanna River and reaches an interchange with Interstate 88 (exit 8). After I-88, the route turns south, paralleling the interstate until the intersection with East Keech Road, where it returns to a southeastern progression through the town of Bainbridge. Just after an intersection with Butts Road, NY 206 crosses the Delaware County line, paralleling NY 8. Reaching the hamlet of Masonville, NY 8 meets NY 206. NY 206 continues east out of the hamlet, bending to the southeast and passing the BOCES of Delaware County. At the junction with CR 27, NY 206 turns to the northeast, winding into the town of Walton.

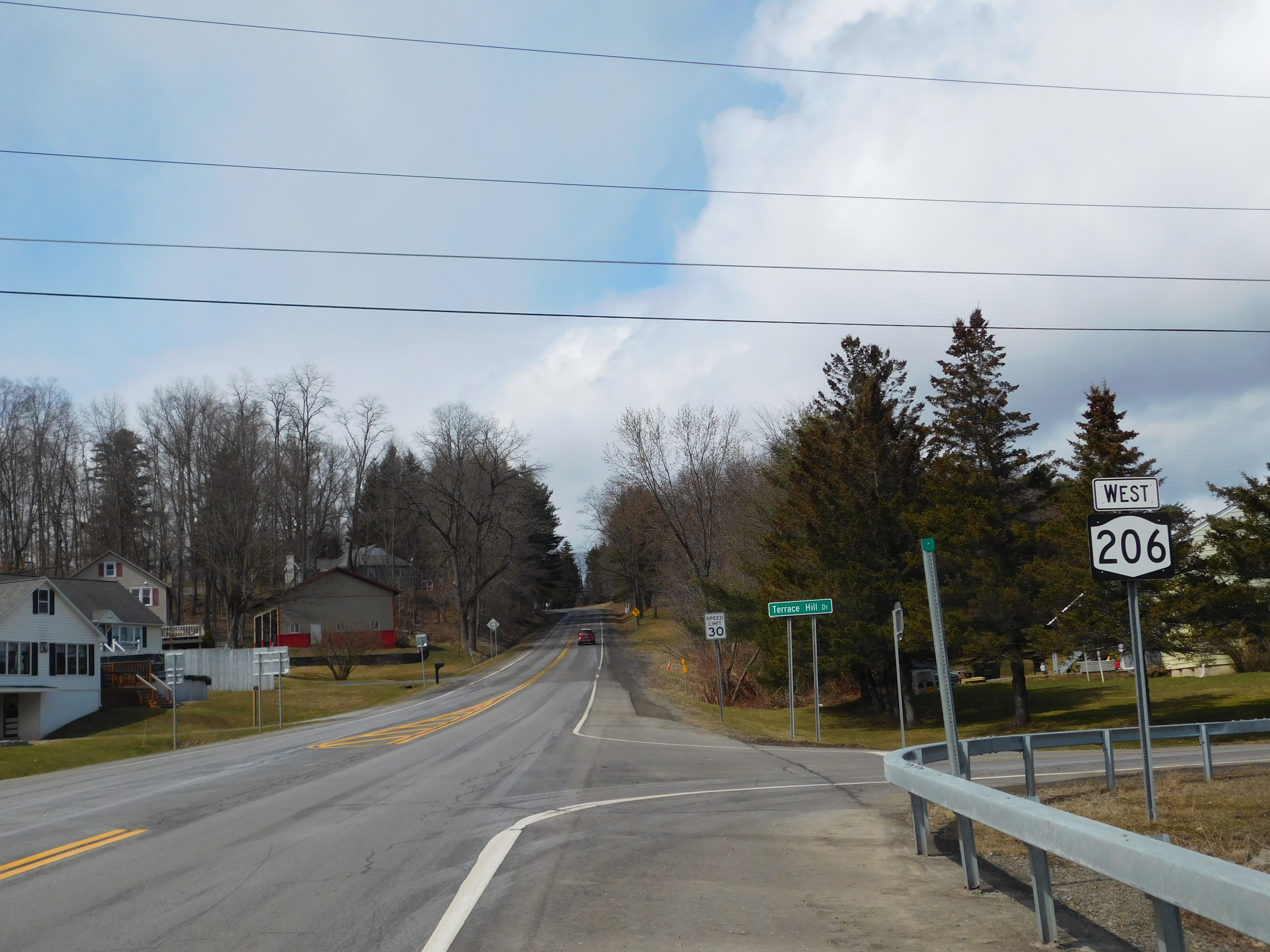
NY 206 in Greene village

Winding southeast into the village of Walton, NY 206 reaches a junction with NY 10 (Prospect Avenue). NY 206 and NY 10 become concurrent along Delaware Street in Walton, until the eastern end, where NY 10 continues east while NY 206 turns south on Bridge Street and crosses the West Branch of the Delaware River. Turning southeast along Stockton Avenue, NY 206 leaves the village, continuing as a two-lane road into the town of Colchester. 10 miles (16 km) from the junction with NY 10, NY 30 enters the hamlet of Downsville, where it meets NY 30.

Running along the East Branch of the Delaware River, NY 206 and NY 30 leaves Downsville into the Catskill Park. The routes run along the southern shore of the Pepacton Reservoir until NY 206 turns southeast at Cat Hollow Road. At this point, the route comes under control of Delaware County, gaining the designation of CR 7. NY 206 and CR 7 run along Cat Hollow Road, a two-lane road through the dense woods of the Catskill Park. Turning southward, NY 206 reaches an intersection with Beaverkill Road, where it turns to the southwest. After crossing the Beaver Kill, NY 206 crosses into Sullivan County, where it goes from CR 7 to CR 91. The junction with Gavette Road on the north side of the Beaver Kill is the location of the fictional hamlet of Agloe, a copyright trap on various road maps.

South of the Beaver Kill, NY 206 and CR 91 gain the name of Rockland Road as they run southwest through the town of Rockland. CR 91 ends at a junction with CR 179A (Old Route 17) in the hamlet of Roscoe. NY 206 turns southeast through Roscoe along CR 179A until a junction with ramps from NY 17 (the Quickway), marking the eastern terminus of NY 206.

== History ==
New York State Route 219
- Location: Whitney Point–Greene
- Existed: 1930–c. 1935

The stretch of NY 206 west of Bainbridge was once part of the Catskill Turnpike. The road was maintained as the eastern part of the Susquehannah and Bath Turnpike, running from Bainbridge to Bath.

NY 206 was assigned as part of the 1930 renumbering of state highways in New York to the portion of its modern alignment between NY 7 in Bainbridge and NY 30 in Downsville. At the same time, the portion of modern NY 206 west of Bainbridge was designated as NY 219 from Whitney Point to Greene, part of NY 41 from Greene to Coventryville, and NY 218 from Coventryville to Bainbridge. When U.S. Route 219 was extended into New York c. 1935, NY 219 was renumbered to NY 383 to eliminate numerical duplication with the new U.S. Highway. In the early 1940s, NY 206 was extended west to Whitney Point, supplanting both NY 218 and NY 383. The extension was partially reverted on January 1, 1949, as the route was cut back to Greene; however, NY 206 was reextended to Whitney Point in the mid-1950s. Another addition on July 1, 1977, moved the east end of NY 206 from Downsville south to NY 17 in Roscoe.

On June 19, 2007, a flash flood along the Beaverkill River and some nearby tributaries along NY 206 near the highway's east end took several lives. Several sections of road were washed out and an 8-mile (13 km) portion of NY 206 was closed. The highway reopened to through traffic on November 16, 2007.

== Major intersections ==
County	Location	mi	km	Destinations	Notes
Broome	Whitney Point	0.00	0.00	NY 26 / NY 79 to US 11 – Chenango Forks, Dorchester Park, Cincinnatus	Western terminus
Chenango	Village of Greene	10.81	17.40	NY 12 / NY 41 north – Binghamton, Norwich	West end of NY 41 overlap
Chenango	Coventry	18.30	29.45	NY 235 south – Harpursville	Northern terminus of NY 235; hamlet of Coventry
Chenango	Coventry	20.41	32.85	NY 41 south – Afton, Oxford	East end of NY 41 overlap; hamlet of Coventryville
Chenango	Village of Bainbridge	27.19	43.76	NY 7 (South Main Street / North Main Street) – Sidney	
Chenango	Town of Bainbridge	27.68	44.55	I-88 – Binghamton, Albany	Diamond interchange; exit 8 on I-88
Delaware	Masonville	34.27	55.15	NY 8 – Deposit, Sidney	
Delaware	Village of Walton	49.97	80.42	NY 10 south (Prospect Avenue)	West end of NY 10 overlap
Delaware	Village of Walton	50.46	81.21	NY 10 north (Delaware Street)	East end of NY 10 overlap
Delaware	Colchester	60.15	96.80	NY 30 south – East Branch	West end of NY 30 overlap; hamlet of Downsville
Delaware	Colchester	63.25	101.79	NY 30 north – Margaretville, Andes	East end of NY 30 overlap
Sullivan	Rockland	74.57	120.01	Future I-86 / NY 17 – New York City, Binghamton	Eastern terminus; exit 94 on NY 17; hamlet of Roscoe
1.000 mi = 1.609 km; 1.000 km = 0.621 mi: Concurrency terminus
