= Bainbridge, New York =

- Town
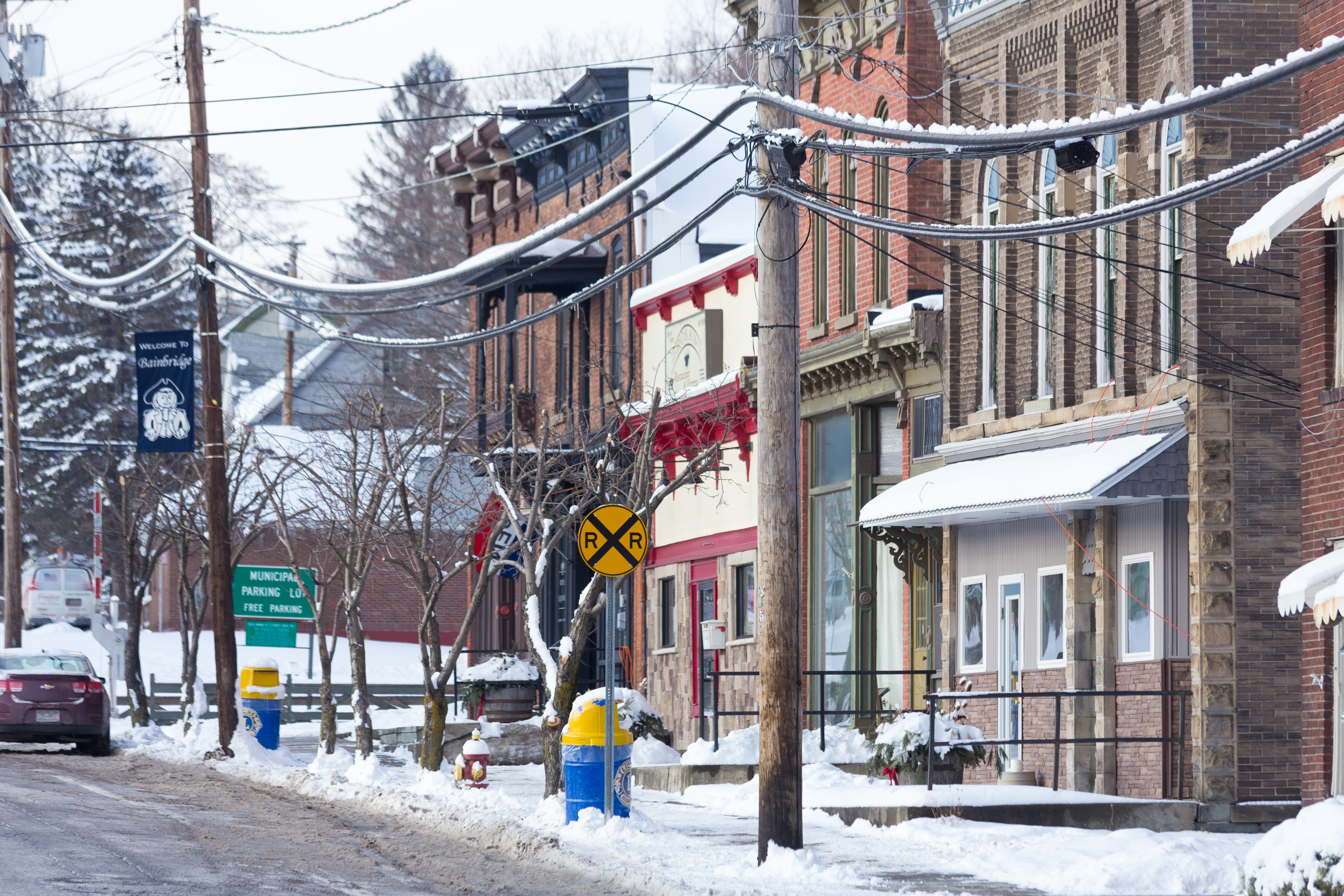
- Center of town

- Location of Bainbridge in Chenango County

- Location of Bainbridge in New York
- Coordinates: 42°18′N 75°30′W
- Country: United States
- State: New York
- County: Chenango

Government
  - Type: Town Council
  - Town Supervisor: Dolores Nabinger (D)
  - Town Council: Members' List: • Rexford Thornton (R); • Kenneth W. Barton (D); • Robert G. Evans (D); • vacancy

Area
  - Total: 34.76 sq mi (90.02 km^{2})
  - Land: 34.31 sq mi (88.86 km^{2})
  - Water: 0.45 sq mi (1.16 km^{2})
- Elevation: 1,006 ft (307 m)

Population (2010)
  - Total: 3,308
  - Estimate (2016): 3,226
  - Density: 94.0/sq mi (36.31/km^{2})
- Time zone: Eastern (EST)
- ZIP Codes: 13733 (Bainbridge); 13730 (Afton)
- FIPS code: 36-017-04044
- Website: www.townofbainbridgeny.org

Bainbridge is a town in Chenango County, New York, United States. The population was 3,308 at the 2010 census.

The Village of Bainbridge is located at the geographic center of the town.

== History ==
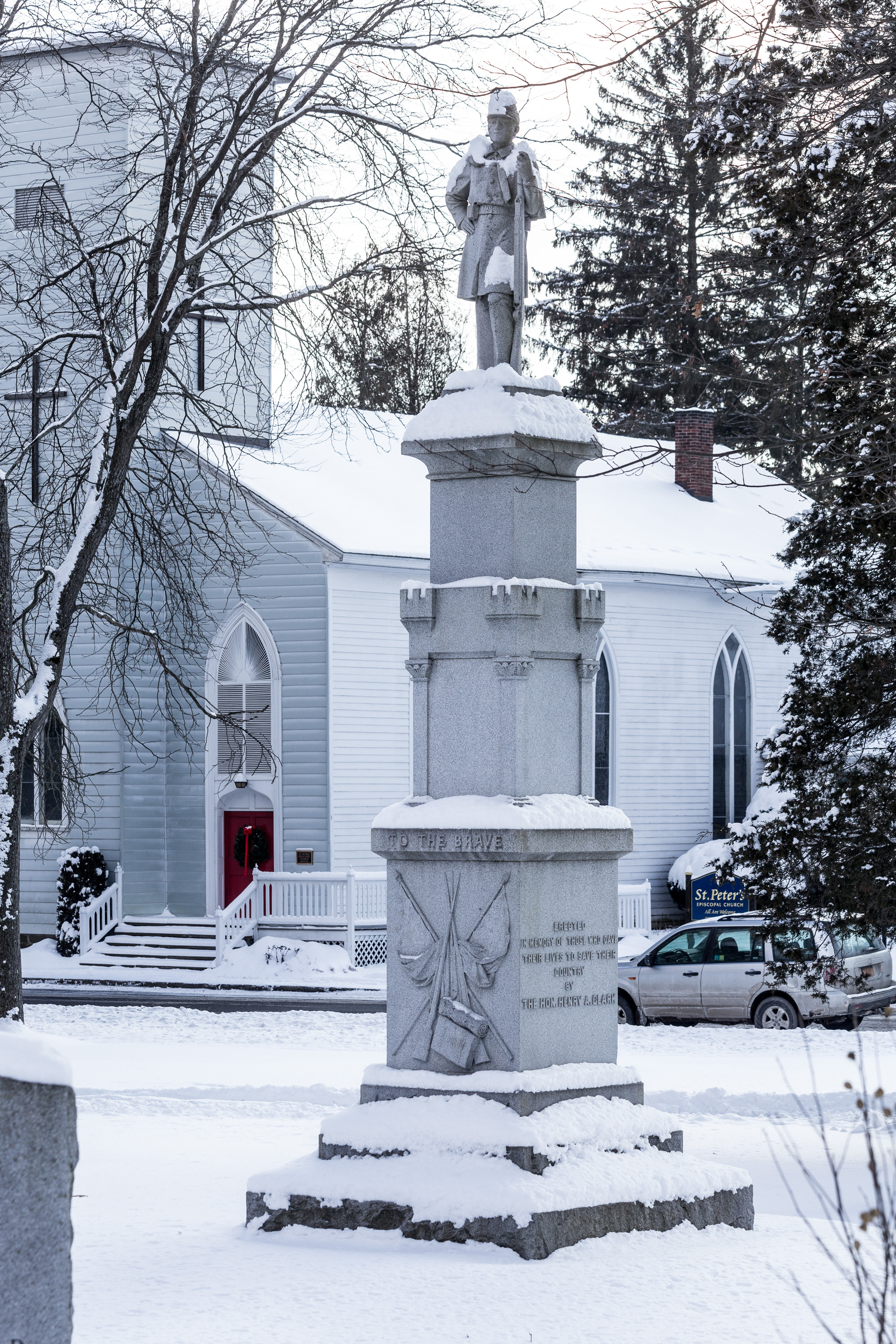
Bainbridge Civil War Memorial in winter

Bainbridge was originally settled by Native Americans of the Iroquois nations. During the American Revolution, these tribes became allies of the British and commenced raids on American settlements. In 1779, George Washington ordered the Sullivan Expedition into what is today Upstate New York. When General James Clinton reached the Bainbridge area, the tribes had fled to sanctuary in Upper Canada. Clinton's forces destroyed their homes and crops, including their winter stores.

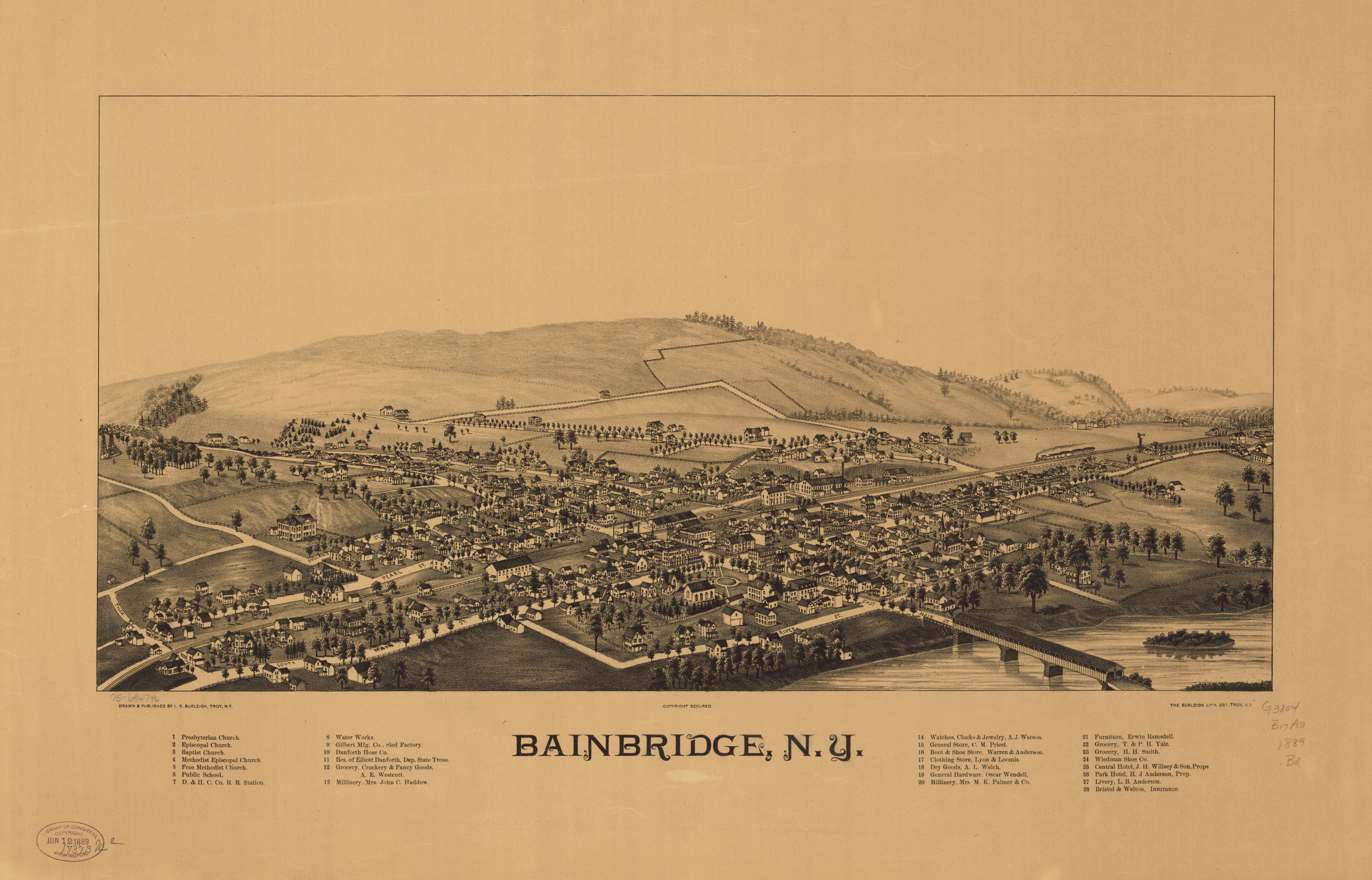
Lithograph of Bainbridge from 1889 by L.R. Burleigh including a list of landmarks

The town was first settled by European Americans circa 1788, first by a group called the "Vermont Sufferers". These were people from land in Eastern New York, who had lost their claims due to land sales by Vermont for the same claims.

The town was formed in 1791 as the "Town of Jericho" in Tioga County before the formation of Chenango County. The name Bainbridge was adopted in 1814 in honor of United States Navy Commodore William Bainbridge. Subsequently, the town was reduced by the creation of new towns in the county: In 1793, part of Bainbridge was used to form the parts of the towns of Norwich and Oxford; more of Bainbridge was used for the towns of Greene (1798 and 1799) and Afton (1857).

== Geography ==
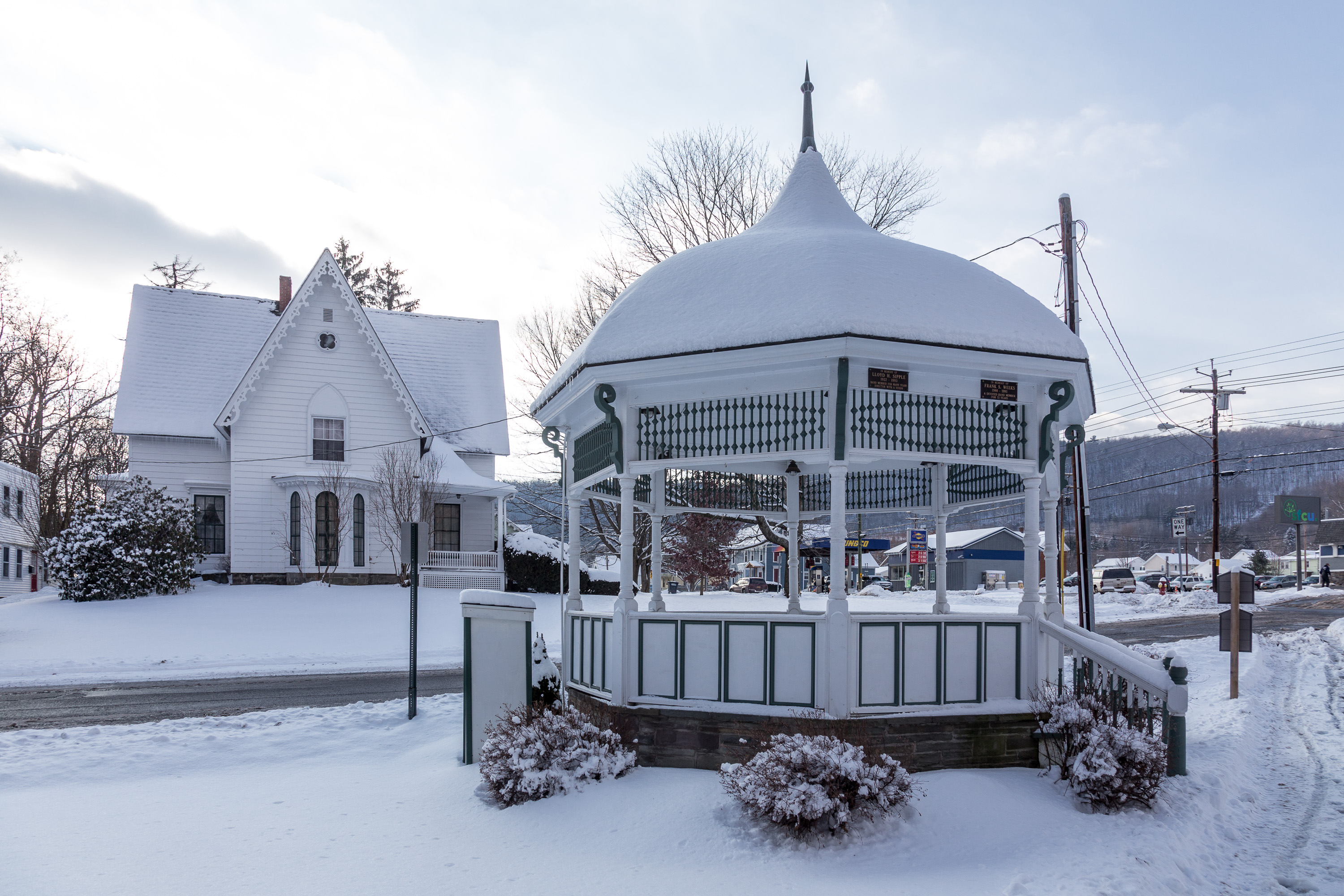
Town common in winter.

According to the United States Census Bureau, the town of Bainbridge has a total area of 34.7 square miles (90.0 km^{2}), of which 34.3 square miles (88.9 km^{2}) is land and 0.42 square miles (1.1 km^{2}), or 1.24%, is water. The Susquehanna River flows through the center of the town, entering from the east side and leaving across the south.

The eastern town line is the border of Delaware County.

Interstate 88 passes through the town, following the Susquehanna River. New York State Route 206 intersects I-88 and New York State Route 7 at Bainbridge village. A traffic circle was built in 2007 at the intersection of County Route 39 and State Route 206 on the eastern shore of the Susquehanna River, between I-88 and Bainbridge village. The bridge over the Susquehanna was finished in 2007, replacing the old, metal bridge.

== Demographics ==
Historical population
Census	Pop.	Note	%±
1820	2,290		—
1830	3,040		32.8%
1840	3,324		9.3%
1850	3,338		0.4%
1860	1,588		−52.4%
1870	1,793		12.9%
1880	1,924		7.3%
1890	2,117		10.0%
1900	1,991		−6.0%
1910	2,017		1.3%
1920	2,009		−0.4%
1930	2,192		9.1%
1940	2,410		9.9%
1950	2,706		12.3%
1960	3,177		17.4%
1970	3,370		6.1%
1980	3,331		−1.2%
1990	3,445		3.4%
2000	3,401		−1.3%
2010	3,308		−2.7%
2016 (est.)	3,226	▼	−2.5%
U.S. Decennial Census

As of the census of 2000, there were 3,401 people, 1,368 households, and 928 families residing in the town. The population density was 99.1 inhabitants per square mile (38.3/km^{2}). There were 1,521 housing units at an average density of 44.3 per square mile (17.1/km^{2}). The racial makeup of the town was 98.35% White, 0.32% Black or African American, 0.24% Asian, 0.06% Pacific Islander, 0.29% from other races, and 0.74% from two or more races. Hispanic or Latino of any race were 1.18% of the population.

There were 1,368 households, out of which 31.0% had children under the age of 18 living with them, 54.8% were married couples living together, 8.8% had a female householder with no husband present, and 32.1% were non-families. 26.7% of all households were made up of individuals, and 11.0% had someone living alone who was 65 years of age or older. The average household size was 2.48 and the average family size was 2.99.

In the town, the population was spread out, with 26.1% under the age of 18, 7.8% from 18 to 24, 27.0% from 25 to 44, 24.7% from 45 to 64, and 14.4% who were 65 years of age or older. The median age was 39 years. For every 100 females, there were 101.5 males. For every 100 females age 18 and over, there were 96.2 males.

The median income for a household in the town was $37,219, and the median income for a family was $41,625. Males had a median income of $28,009 versus $25,533 for females. The per capita income for the town was $17,832. About 8.6% of families and 10.9% of the population were below the poverty line, including 13.8% of those under age 18 and 6.0% of those age 65 or over.

== Communities and locations in the town of Bainbridge ==
- Bainbridge – The village of Bainbridge is at the junction of NY-7 and NY-206 by the Susquehanna River.
- Bennettsville – A hamlet by the eastern town line in the southeastern part of the town on NY-206.
- Sidney Municipal Airport (N23) – An airport at the eastern town line, partly in Bainbridge, north of I-88.
- Union Valley – A hamlet in the northwestern corner of the town and north of West Bainbridge on County Road 17.
- West Bainbridge – A hamlet near the western town line on NY-206.

== Climate ==
This climatic region is typified by large seasonal temperature differences, with warm to hot (and often humid) summers and cold (sometimes severely cold) winters. According to the Köppen Climate Classification system, Bainbridge has a humid continental climate, abbreviated "Dfb" on climate maps.

== Notable person ==
- Jedediah Smith (1799-1831) one of America's more famous mountain men and explorers of the west
