= John Benedict Hoyt =

American minister (1794–1862)

- Born: January 31, 1794; Walton, New York, U.S.
- Died: July 4, 1862 (aged 68); Coventry, New York, U.S.
- Occupation: Minister
- Spouse(s): Emeline C. Fenn; Eliza Ann Phillips
- Children: 8

John Benedict Hoyt (January 31, 1794 – July 4, 1862) was an American minister from New York.

== Early life ==
John Benedict Hoyt waas born on January 31, 1794, in Walton, New York, to Jemima (née Benedict) and Thaddeus Hoyt. His mother was from New Canaan, Connecticut. Hoyt graduated from Yale University in 1814.

Following graduation, Hoyt taught for a year in Dutchess County, New York. He then studied theology with Reverend S. Williston in Durham. In 1818, he was licensed to preach and was ordained in Greene, New York.

== Career ==
After being ordained, Hot remained as pastor of the Congregational church. In 1829, he joined the Second Congregational Church in Coventry. He published a volume of sermons titled "A Pastor's Tribute to his People" in 1851 and other writings.

== Personal life ==
Hoyt married Emeline C. Fenn of Harpersfield. She later died. He then married Eliza Ann Phillips of Coventry. He had eight children.

Hoyt died on July 4, 1862, in Coventry.
