= Clinton–Rosekrans Law Building =

Historic commercial building in New York, United States

- U.S. National Register of Historic Places
- U.S. Historic district – Contributing property
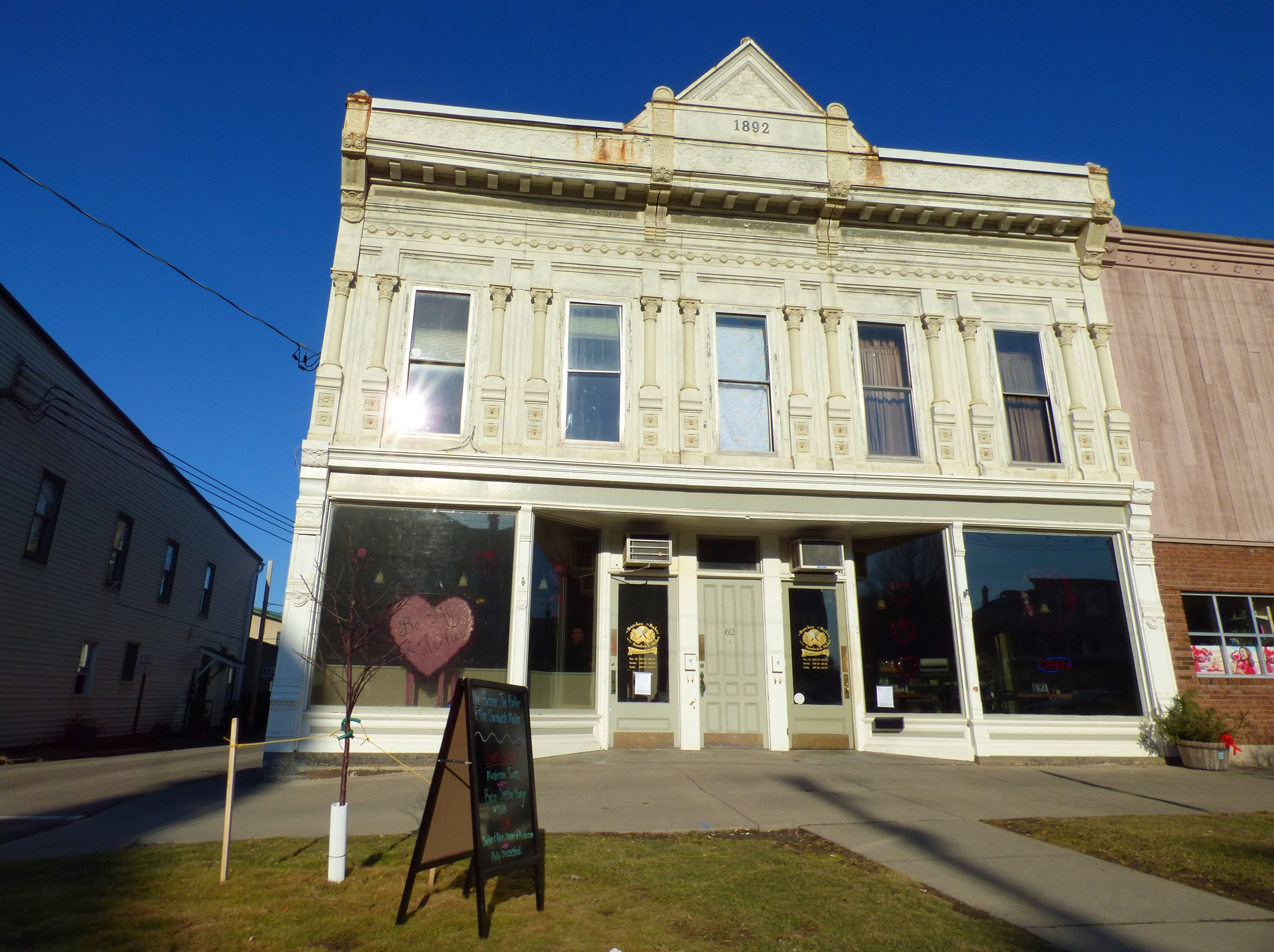

- Location within New York Location within the United States
- Location: 62 Genesee St, Greene, New York
- Coordinates: 42°19′47″N 75°46′15″W
- Area: less than one acre
- Built: 1892
- Architect: Williams, Charles L.
- Architectural style: Classical Revival, Romanesque
- Part of: Greene Historic District (ID2003350)
- NRHP reference No.: 79001569

Significant dates
- Added to NRHP: July 27, 1979
- Designated CP: September 9, 1982

Clinton–Rosekrans Law Building is a historic law office at Greene in Chenango County, New York. It was built in 1892 and is a simple two story brick structure with an ornate, galvanized iron front. It measures 40 feet wide and 60 feet deep, with a frame second story porch in the rear. It is located within the Greene Historic District.

It was added to the National Register of Historic Places in 1979.

== See also ==
- Acker and Evans Law Office: NRHP listing in Ogdensburg, New York
- Heermance House and Law Office: NRHP listing in Rhinecliff, New York
- National Register of Historic Places listings in Chenango County, New York
