= John Hoyt (disambiguation) =

John Hoyt (1905–1991) was an American actor.

John Hoyt may also refer to:

- John Benedict Hoyt (1794–1862), American minister from New York
- John Garvin Hoyt (born 1931), Puerto Rican Olympic sailor
- John Philo Hoyt (1841–1926), Michigan politician and Governor of Arizona Territory from 1876 to 1878
- John Wesley Hoyt (1831–1910), Governor of Wyoming Territory from 1878 to 1882

== See also ==
- John Hoyte (1835-1913), New Zealand painter
