= Main Street Historic District (Afton, New York) =

Historic district in New York, United States

- U.S. National Register of Historic Places
- U.S. Historic district
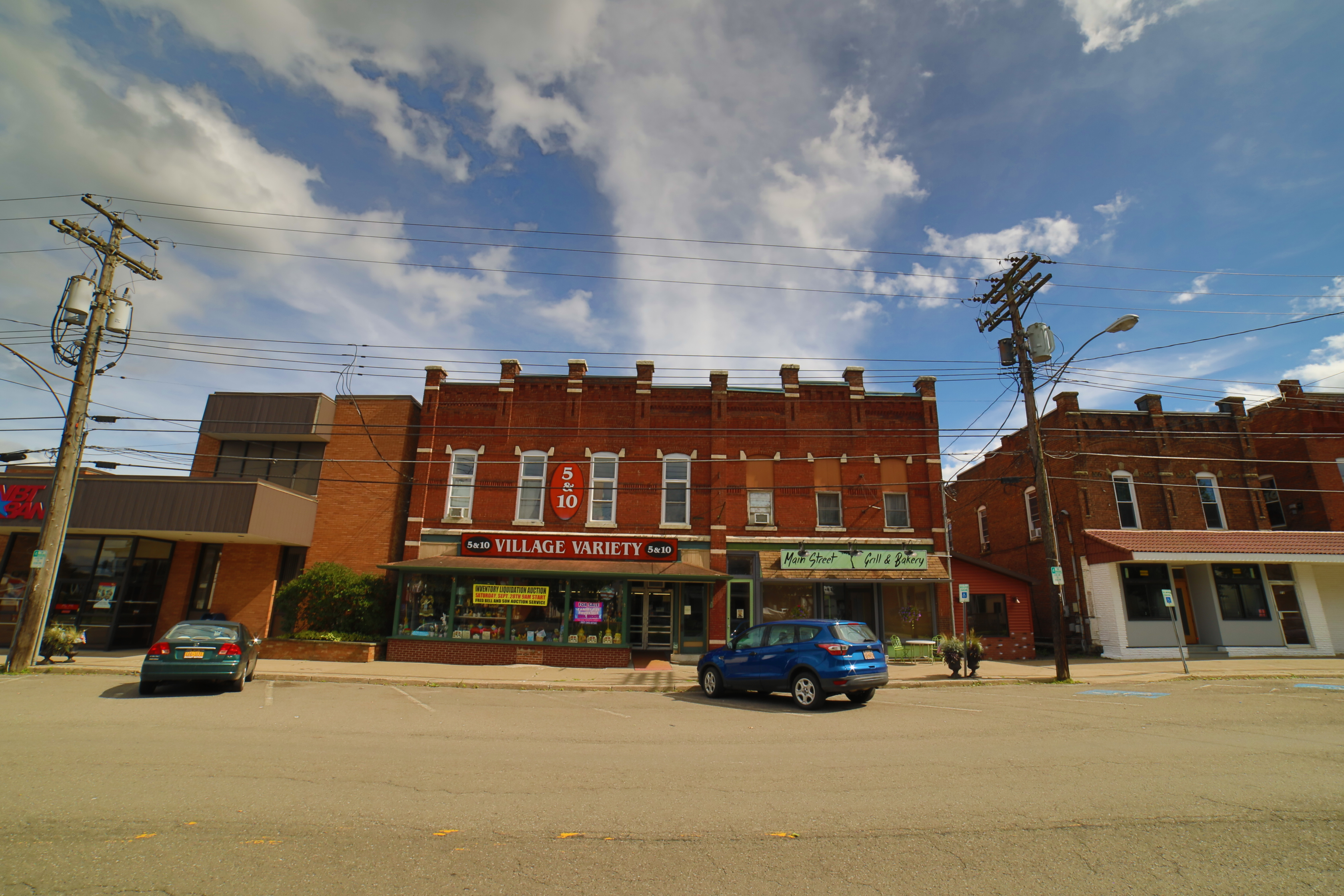
- The Village 5 and 10 and Main Street Grille & Bakery along Main Street.

- Location within New York Location within the United States
- Location: 169-191 and 158-180 Main St., Afton, New York
- Coordinates: 42°13′41″N 75°31′36″W
- Area: 2 acres (0.81 ha)
- Built: 1870
- Architectural style: Early Commercial, Romanesque
- NRHP reference No.: 83001662
- Added to NRHP: June 30, 1983

Main Street Historic District is a national historic district located at Afton in Chenango County, New York. The district includes 11 contributing buildings. All but one of the buildings are two or three story commercial blocks built between 1868 and 1900.

It was added to the National Register of Historic Places in 1983.
