= Bainbridge Historic District =

Historic district in New York, United States

- U.S. National Register of Historic Places
- U.S. Historic district
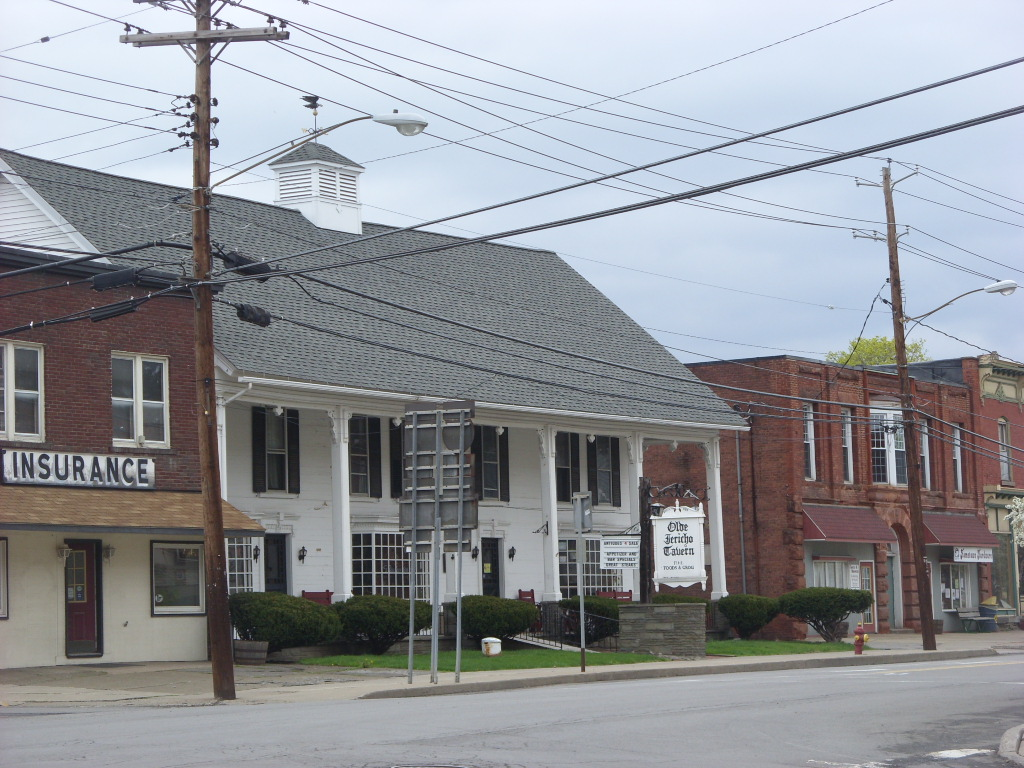
- Old Jericho Tavern, May 2009

- Location within New York Location within the United States
- Location: E. Main, Juliand, N. Main, Pearl, S. Main, and W. Main Sts., Park Pl. and Railroad Ave., Bainbridge, New York
- Coordinates: 42°17′41″N 75°28′46″W
- Area: 50 acres (20 ha)
- Architect: Multiple
- Architectural style: Late Victorian, Federal, late 19th- and 20th-century revival
- NRHP reference No.: 82001095
- Added to NRHP: November 9, 1982

Bainbridge Historic District is a national historic district located at Bainbridge in Chenango County, New York. The district includes 93 contributing buildings, two contributing sites, one contributing structure, and one contributing object. It encompasses the village's most intensive concentration of historically and architecturally significant properties. It includes commercial, residential, civic, and ecclesiastical buildings. It includes the village green with bandstand and the adjacent United Presbyterian Church (1831) and St. Peter's Episcopal Church (1826). Other notable buildings include the Bainbridge Town Hall (1909), Old Jericho Tavern (1805, 1817), and First United Methodist Church (1902). Located within the district are the house and carriage house of the separately listed Charles C. Hovey House and Strong Leather Company Mill. It was added to the National Register of Historic Places in 1982.

== Gallery ==
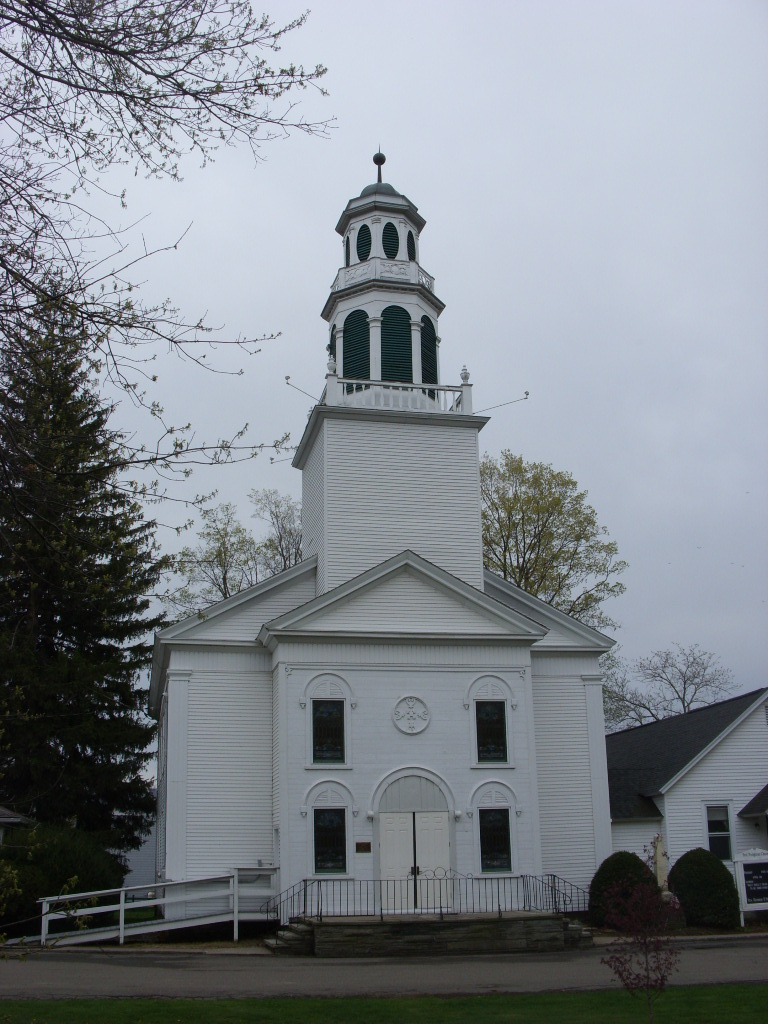
United Presbyterian Church, May 2009
