= Greene Historic District =

Historic district in New York, United States

- U.S. National Register of Historic Places
- U.S. Historic district
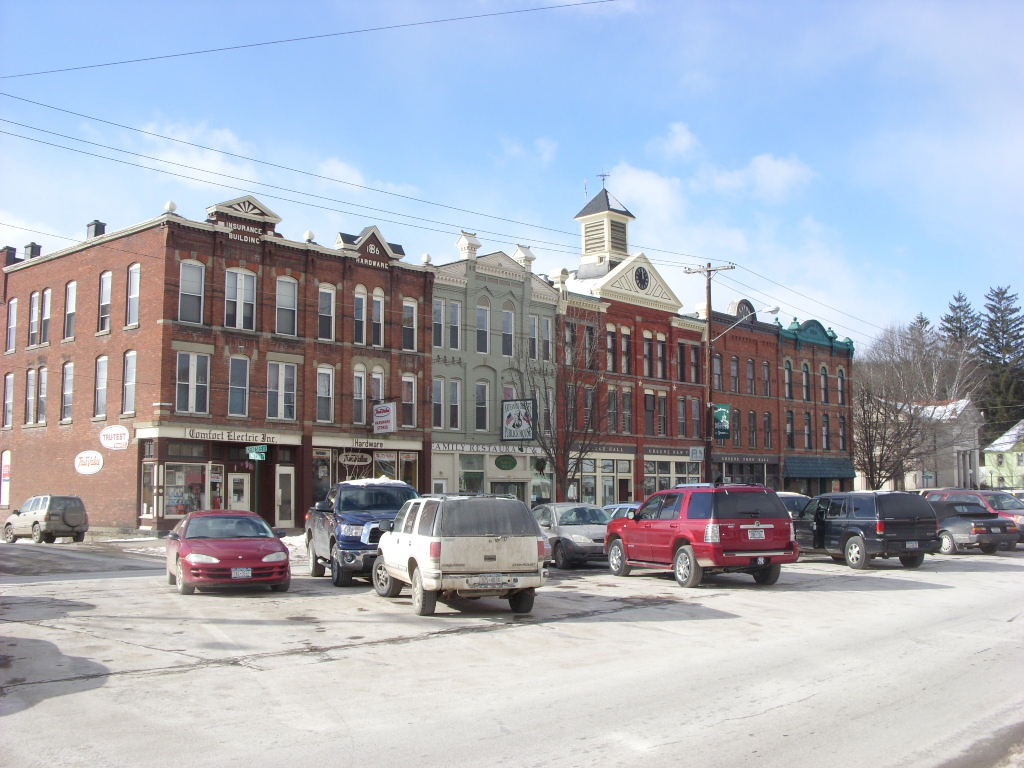
- Municipal Building and adjacent commercial buildings, January 2009

- Location within New York Location within the United States
- Location: Chenango, Genesee, and Jackson Sts., Greene, New York
- Coordinates: 42°19′44″N 75°46′18″W
- Area: 58 acres (23 ha)
- Built: 1806
- Architect: Multiple
- Architectural style: Colonial Revival, Federal, Georgian Revival
- NRHP reference No.: 82003350
- Added to NRHP: September 9, 1982

Greene Historic District is a national historic district located at Greene in Chenango County, New York.

The district includes 141 buildings contributing to the historic district and one contributing site. It includes the main commercial area and the oldest residential neighborhoods, with notable public buildings interspersed. The commercial structures are two or three story frame or brick buildings and include the Sherwood Hotel (1913). Other notable ecclesiastical and public buildings include the Municipal Building (1886), Moore Public Library (1903), Zion Episcopal Church (1886, designed by Henry M. Congdon), Church of the Immaculate Conception (1834), First Congregational Church (1820), and Central Baptist Church (1901). Located within the district is the Clinton-Rosekrans Law Building, that is listed separately on the National Register of Historic District.

The Greene Historic District was added to the National Register of Historic Places in 1982.

== Gallery ==
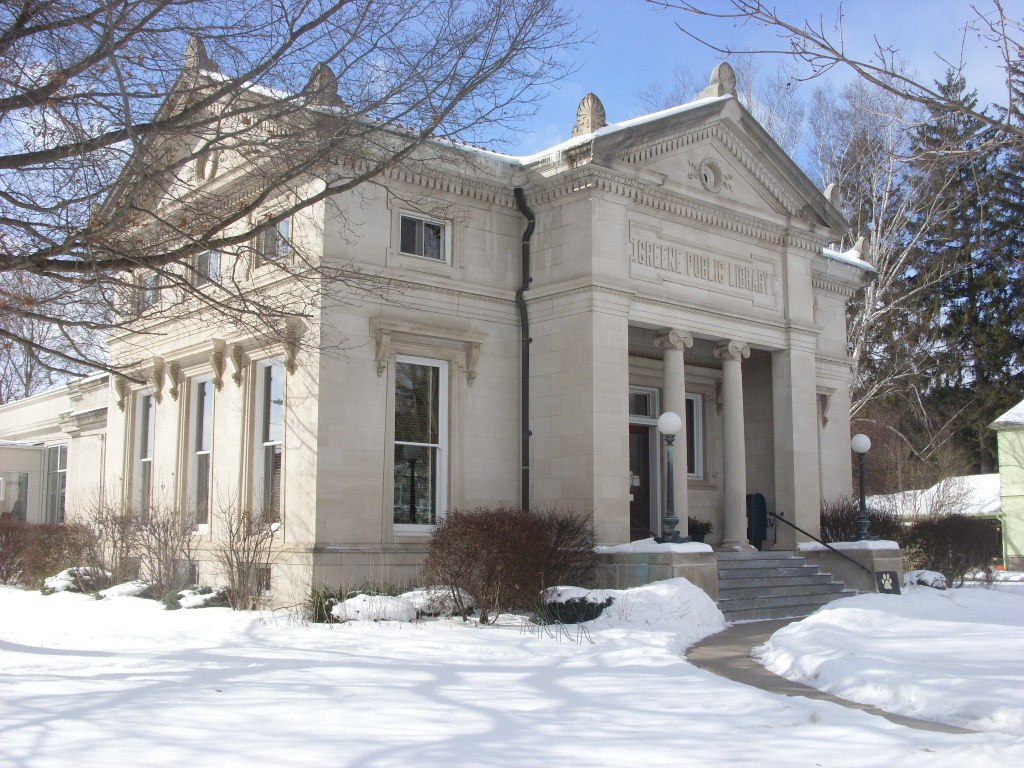
Moore Public Library, January 2009
