= Afton, New York =

- Town
- Location in Chenango County and the state of New York.

- Location of New York in the United States
- Coordinates: 42°13′44″N 75°31′33″W
- Country: United States
- State: New York
- County: Chenango County
- Incorporated: 1857

Government
  - Mayor: Samuel dryer (R) Town Council: Calvin Tallmadge (R); Jamie Baciuska (R); Mary Jo Long (G); John H. Lawrence (R)

Area
  - Total: 77.3 sq mi (200.2 km^{2})
  - Land: 46.07 sq mi (119.32 km^{2})
  - Water: 0.63 sq mi (1.63 km^{2})
- Elevation: 989 ft (301 m)

Population (2020)
  - Total: 2,769
  - Density: 60.1/sq mi (23.21/km^{2})
- Time zone: UTC-5 (EST)
  - Summer (DST): UTC-4 (EDT)
- ZIP Codes: 13730 (Afton); 13733 (Bainbridge); 13787 (Harpursville); 13813 (Nineveh)
- Area code: 607
- FIPS code: 36-017-00353
- Website: Town website

Afton is a town in Chenango County, New York, United States. The population was 2,769 at the 2020 census. Afton is situated in the southeast corner of the county and lies wholly within the original Township of Clinton. It was formed from the town of Bainbridge on November 18, 1857, and derives its name from Afton Water, a small river in the parish of New Cumnock, Ayrshire, Scotland, immortalized by the poet Robert Burns. It is bounded on the north by Bainbridge and Coventry, on the east by Delaware County, and on the west and south by Broome County.

The town of Afton contains a village, also called Afton. The town is at the southeastern corner of the county and is northeast of Binghamton.

== History ==
The area of Afton was first settled around 1786. The town of Afton was founded from part of the town of Bainbridge in 1857.

Bainbridge and Afton were once combined as one town called Jericho. A particularly severe winter storm left residents starving or freezing to death from lack of supplies in the area which is now known as Afton. The cold and snow had been so severe, the townspeople of what is now Bainbridge refused to help. When spring came, hard feelings were had by the rural residents, and the town of Jericho split into two. Afton was named from a line in a poem cherished by the town, and also named with an "A" because it came first alphabetically, so that it came before "Bainbridge" on state registers. Afton was once called "Clinton" after General George Clinton, and was jokingly called "Jockey Port" due to the horse raceway in Afton.

It was also previously known as "South Bainbridge" as it was created from the southern part of the town of Bainbridge.

Joseph Smith, founder of the Church of Jesus Christ of Latter-day Saints, was married to Emma Hale in Afton. The marriage took place at the site of what is now the Afton Fairgrounds and Raceway.

Afton was a stop on the Underground Railroad for slaves escaping from the South. Some houses in Afton are found to have secret rooms and staircases, as in a house on Pleasant Avenue.

== Geography ==
According to the United States Census Bureau, the town has a total area of 46.5 square miles (120.5 km^{2}), of which 45.8 square miles (118.7 km^{2}) is land and 0.69 square miles (1.8 km^{2}), or 1.46% of it is water.

Interstate 88 and the Susquehanna River pass through the town. New York State Route 7 intersects New York State Route 41 at Afton village.

The western and southern town lines are the border of Broome County, and the eastern town boundary is the border of Delaware County.

== Demographics ==
Historical population
Census	Pop.	Note	%±
1860	1,992		—
1870	1,931		−3.1%
1880	2,248		16.4%
1890	2,083		−7.3%
1900	1,920		−7.8%
1910	4,203		118.9%
1920	1,840		−56.2%
1930	1,871		1.7%
1940	1,848		−1.2%
1950	2,047		10.8%
1960	2,245		9.7%
1970	2,464		9.8%
1980	2,728		10.7%
1990	2,972		8.9%
2000	2,977		0.2%
2010	2,851		−4.2%
2020	2,769		−2.9%
U.S. Decennial Census

As of the census of 2000, there were 2,977 people, 1,186 households, and 829 families residing in the town. The population density was 64.8 inhabitants per square mile (25.0/km^{2}). There were 1,404 housing units at an average density of 30.6 per square mile (11.8/km^{2}). The racial makeup of the town was 98.66% White, 0.27% Black or African American, 0.54% Native American, 0.07% Asian, 0.07% from other races, and 0.40% from two or more races. Hispanic or Latino of any race were 0.74% of the population.

There were 1,186 households, out of which 31.8% had children under the age of 18 living with them, 54.7% were married couples living together, 9.5% had a female householder with no husband present, and 30.1% were non-families. 25.8% of all households were made up of individuals, and 11.5% had someone living alone who was 65 years of age or older. The average household size was 2.50 and the average family size was 2.98.

In the town, the population was spread out, with 25.8% under the age of 18, 6.3% from 18 to 24, 27.8% from 25 to 44, 25.3% from 45 to 64, and 14.8% who were 65 years of age or older. The median age was 39 years. For every 100 females, there were 99.3 males. For every 100 females age 18 and over, there were 96.0 males.

The median income for a household in the town was $33,730, and the median income for a family was $40,122. Males had a median income of $30,656 versus $25,247 for females. The per capita income for the town was $16,239. About 7.3% of families and 11.9% of the population were below the poverty line, including 15.4% of those under age 18 and 7.3% of those age 65 or over.

== Communities and locations in the town ==
- Afton – A village located on NY Route 7 near the center of the town and by the Susquehanna River.
- Bettsburg – A hamlet near the southern town line on NY-41. It is named after Peter Betts, a local merchant.
- East Afton – A hamlet in the southeastern corner of the town.
- Middle Bridge – A hamlet northeast of Afton village, located on County Road 39 on the south side of the Susquehanna River.
- Nineveh – A hamlet at the town line on NY-7.
- Nineveh Junction – A hamlet in the southwestern part of the town.
- North Afton – A hamlet near the northern town line and north of Afton village on NY Route 41. It incorporated as a village in 1829, was dissolved and re-incorporated in 1833, and later dissolved its incorporation again. North Afton was formerly called "Ayrshire."

== Notable person ==
- Elijah Easton, farmer who served in both the Wisconsin and Minnesota legislatures, was a native of Afton
