= District School 2 (Coventryville, New York) =

- U.S. National Register of Historic Places
- Location within New York Location within the United States
- Location: Cty Rte 27, Coventryville, New York
- Coordinates: 42°18′53″N 75°35′54″W
- Area: less than one acre
- Built: 1852
- Architectural style: Greek Revival
- NRHP reference No.: 04000096
- Added to NRHP: February 25, 2004

District School 2 is a historic one room school building located at Coventryville in Chenango County, New York. It is a one-story, wood-frame building on a cut stone foundation built in 1852. It is three bays wide and two bays deep with a broad gable roof.

It was added to the National Register of Historic Places in 2004.
