= District School 4 (Coventry, New York) =

- U.S. National Register of Historic Places
- Location within New York Location within the United States
- Location: NY 235, Coventry, New York
- Coordinates: 42°18′53″N 75°38′22″W
- Area: less than one acre
- Built: 1900
- NRHP reference No.: 04000353
- Added to NRHP: April 21, 2004

District School 4 is a historic one room school building located at Coventry in Chenango County, New York. It is a 1 1/2-story, wood-frame building on a cut-stone foundation built about 1900. It is four bays wide and three bays deep with a broad gable roof.

It was added to the National Register of Historic Places in 2004.
