= Acker and Evans Law Office =

Historic commercial building in New York, United States

- U.S. National Register of Historic Places
- New York State Register of Historic Places
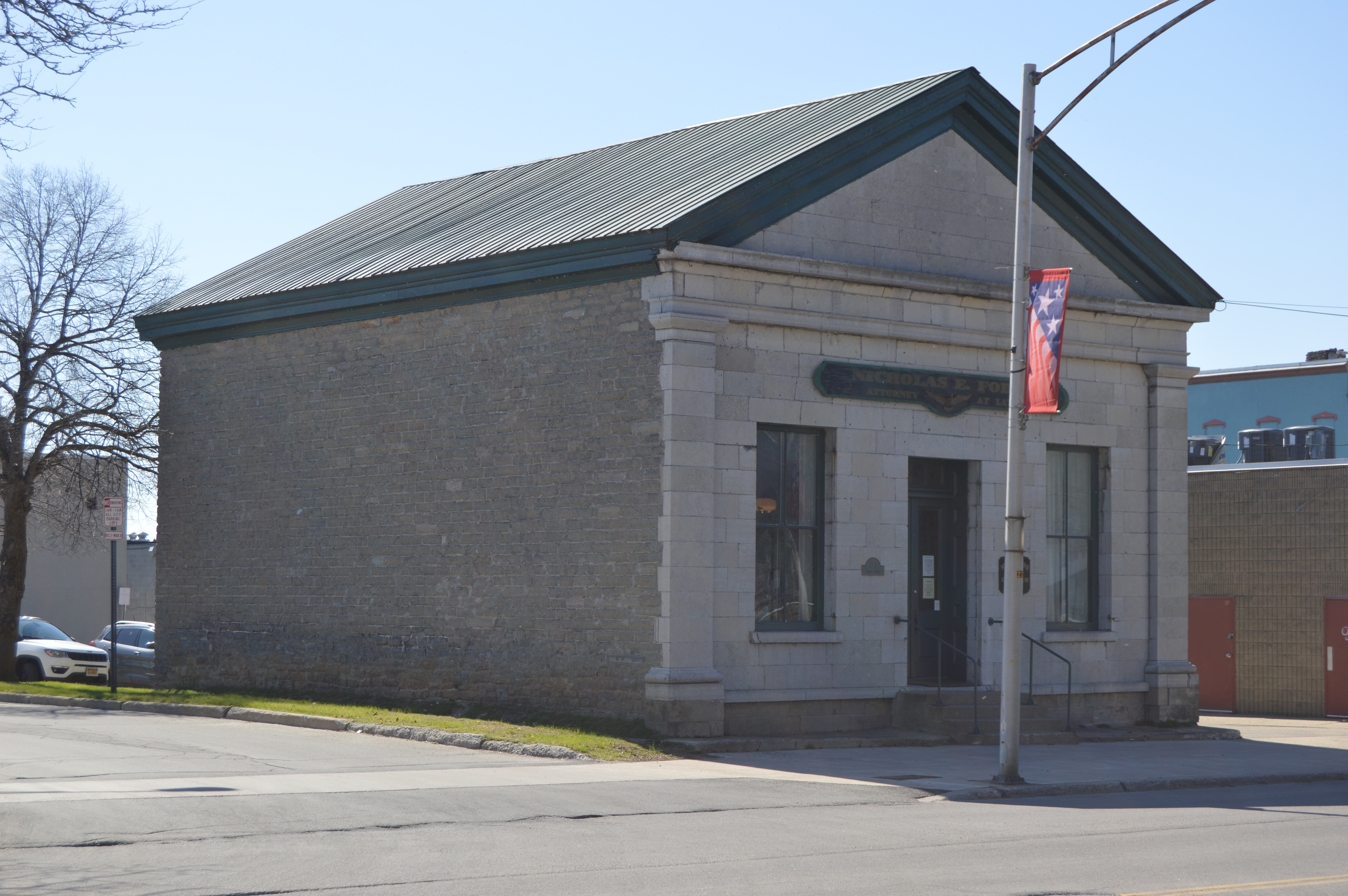
- Southern side and front

- Location within New York Location within the United States
- Location: 315 State Street; Ogdensburg, New York
- Coordinates: 44°41′49.5″N 75°29′33″W
- Area: 0.5 acres (0.20 ha)
- Built: 1830
- Architectural style: Greek Revival
- NRHP reference No.: 83001792
- NYSRHP No.: 08940.000233

Significant dates
- Added to NRHP: September 15, 1983
- Designated NYSRHP: August 11, 1983

Acker and Evans Law Office (also known as Ogdensburg Bank) is a historic office building in Ogdensburg, New York, United States. It is a rectangular Greek Revival style structure with a facade of smooth-faced, locally quarried white marble. It was built about 1830 as a bank, then used as a ticket agency, insurance office, express office, and finally as a law office.

It was listed on the National Register of Historic Places in 1983.

== See also ==
- Clinton–Rosekrans Law Building: NRHP listing in Greene (Village), New York
- Heermance House and Law Office: NRHP listing in Rhinecliff, New York
- National Register of Historic Places listings in St. Lawrence County, New York
