= Heermance House and Law Office =

Historic house in New York, US

- U.S. National Register of Historic Places
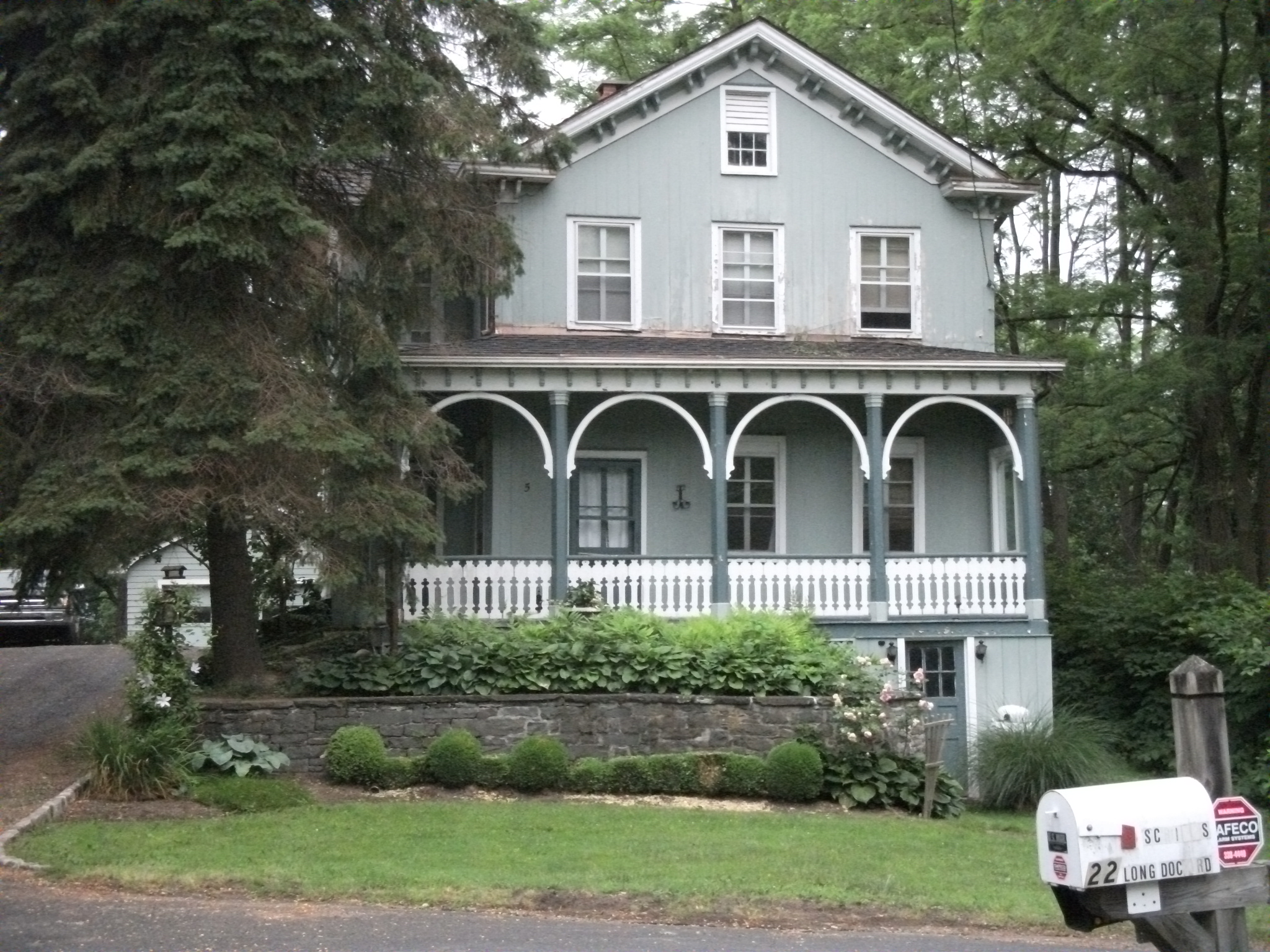
- Heermance House and Law Office, June 2011

- Location within New York Location within the United States
- Location: Jct. of Rhinecliff and Long Dock Rds., Rhinecliff, New York
- Coordinates: 41°55′42″N 73°56′39″W
- Area: 1.3 acres (0.53 ha)
- Built: 1858
- Architectural style: Picturesque Italianate
- MPS: Rhinebeck Town MRA
- NRHP reference No.: 87001091
- Added to NRHP: July 9, 1987

Heermance House and Law Office is a historic home located at Rhinecliff, Dutchess County, New York. Located on the property is a cottage, built about 1858 in the Picturesque Italianate style; the Gothic-inspired law office building, built about 1886; and a garage, built about 1900. The house is a two-story, three bay building with a broad picturesque verandah, ornamental brackets, and pierced woodwork. It has a long, two story, gable roofed rear wing. The law office building is a small, one story frame structure sheathed in clapboard.

It was added to the National Register of Historic Places in 1987.

== See also ==
- Acker and Evans Law Office: NRHP listing in Ogdensburg, New York
- Clinton–Rosekrans Law Building: NRHP listing in Greene (Village), New York
- National Register of Historic Places listings in Rhinebeck, New York
