= Charles C. Hovey House and Strong Leather Company Mill =

Historic house in New York, United States

- U.S. National Register of Historic Places
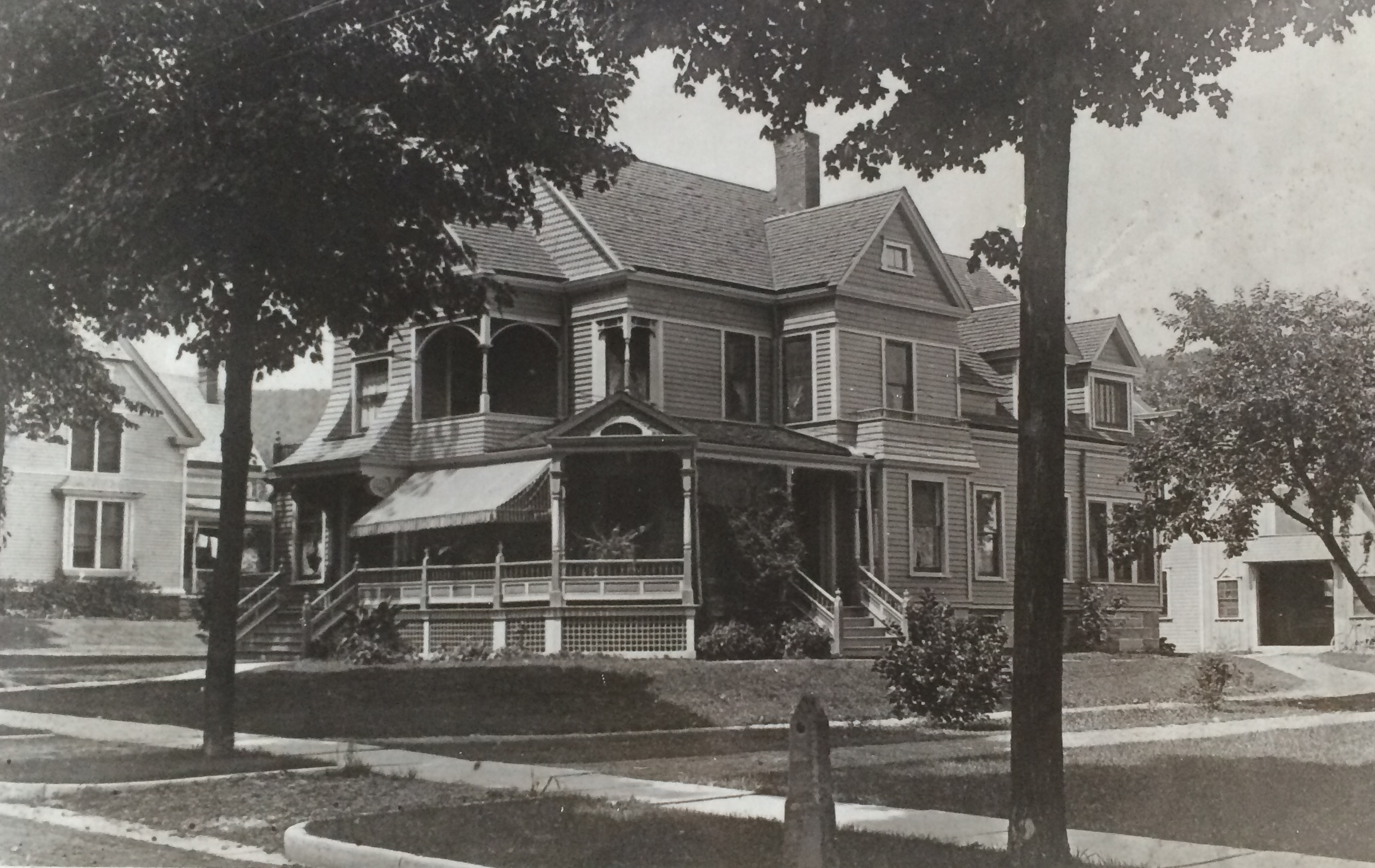
- Charles C. Hovey house in the historic district of Bainbridge, NY

- Location within New York Location within the United States
- Location: 53 W. Main St. and 10 Bixby St., Bainbridge, New York
- Coordinates: 42°17′45″N 75°29′0″W
- Area: less than one acre
- Built: 1889
- Architectural style: Queen Anne
- NRHP reference No.: 96001426
- Added to NRHP: December 6, 1996

Charles C. Hovey House and Strong Leather Company Mill is a historic home and mill located at Bainbridge in Chenango County, New York. The house is a 2 1/2-story Queen Anne style residence constructed in 1889. It and the adjacent carriage house were included as part of the Bainbridge Historic District. The mill building is a long 1 1/2-story, 5,000-square-foot (460 m^{2}) structure built between 1897 and 1903 to house the Strong Leather Company, a manufacturer of patent leather. The roof is defined by its unusual parabolic arch, formed by a series of 60 rounded bows joined to the rafters.

It was added to the National Register of Historic Places in 1996.
