= Greene, New York =

- Town
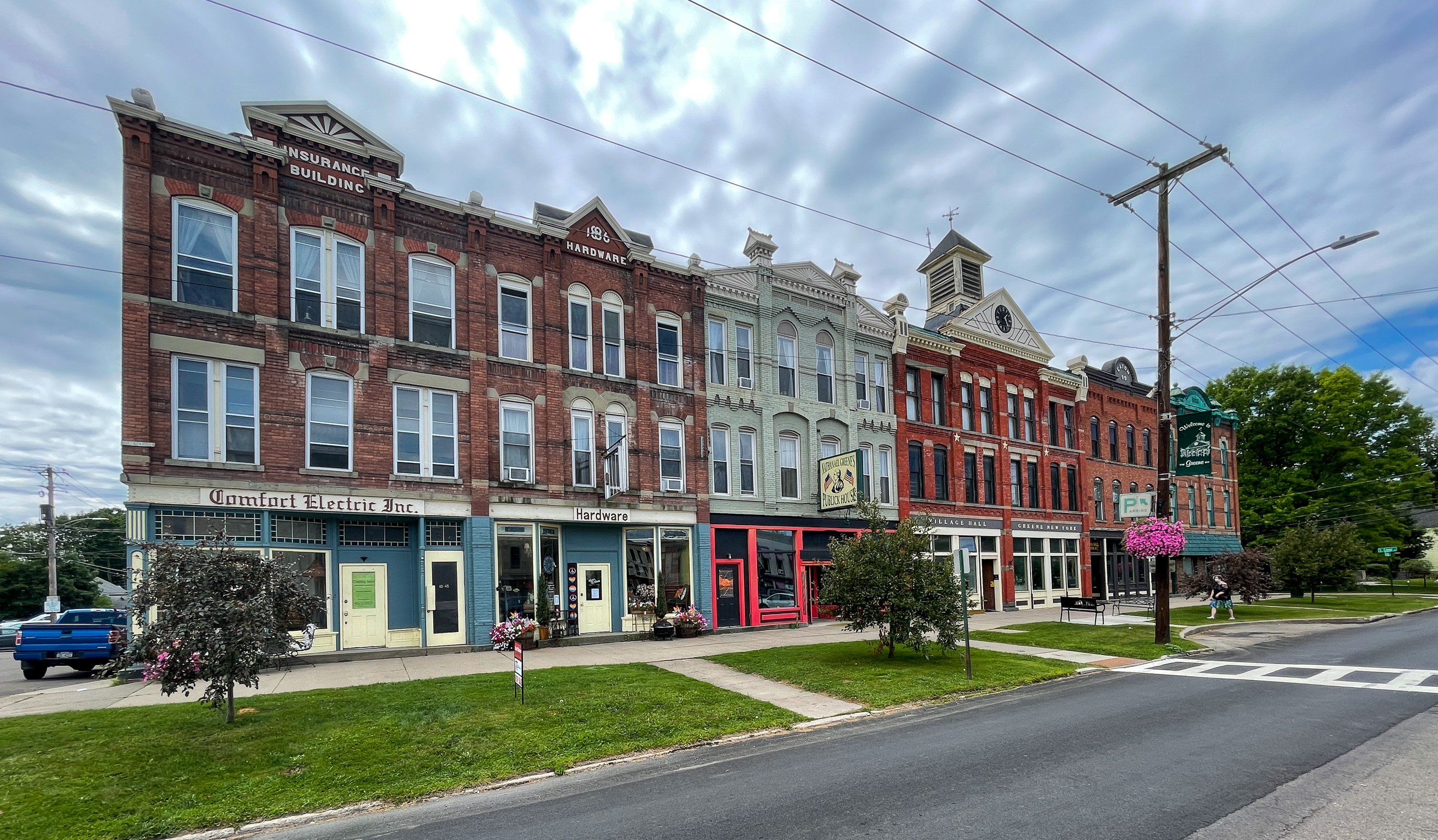
- Historic buildings line Genesee Street in downtown Greene

- Location of Greene in New York
- Coordinates: 42°19′52″N 75°46′23″W
- Country: United States
- State: New York
- County: Chenango

Government
  - Type: Town Council
  - Town Supervisor: Bernard E. McDermott (R)
  - Town Council: Members' List: • Joseph M. Henninge (R); • David C. Young (R); • Diane Flanagan (R); • Stephen L. Page (D)

Area
  - Total: 75.62 sq mi (195.85 km^{2})
  - Land: 75.08 sq mi (194.45 km^{2})
  - Water: 0.54 sq mi (1.40 km^{2})
- Elevation: 920 ft (280 m)

Population (2010)
  - Total: 5,604
  - Estimate (2016): 5,249
  - Density: 69.9/sq mi (26.99/km^{2})
- Time zone: UTC-5 (Eastern (EST))
  - Summer (DST): UTC-4 (EDT)
- ZIP Codes: 13778 (Greene); 13746 (Chenango Forks); 13787 (Harpursville); 13830 (Oxford)
- FIPS code: 36-017-30422
- Website: www.nygreene.gov

Greene is a town in Chenango County, New York, United States. The population was 5,296 at the 2020 census. The town is named after General Nathanael Greene. It is located in the southwestern corner of the county and contains a village, also named Greene. The town and village are northeast of Binghamton. Greene was founded in 1792, but commenced in 1798 (though this is hotly disputed).

== History ==
Part of modern Greene was from land purchased in 1785 from the Oneida and Tuscarora people, but many of the Oneida remained in the area until circa 1812. In 1792, the first outside settler arrived and established himself at Greene village.

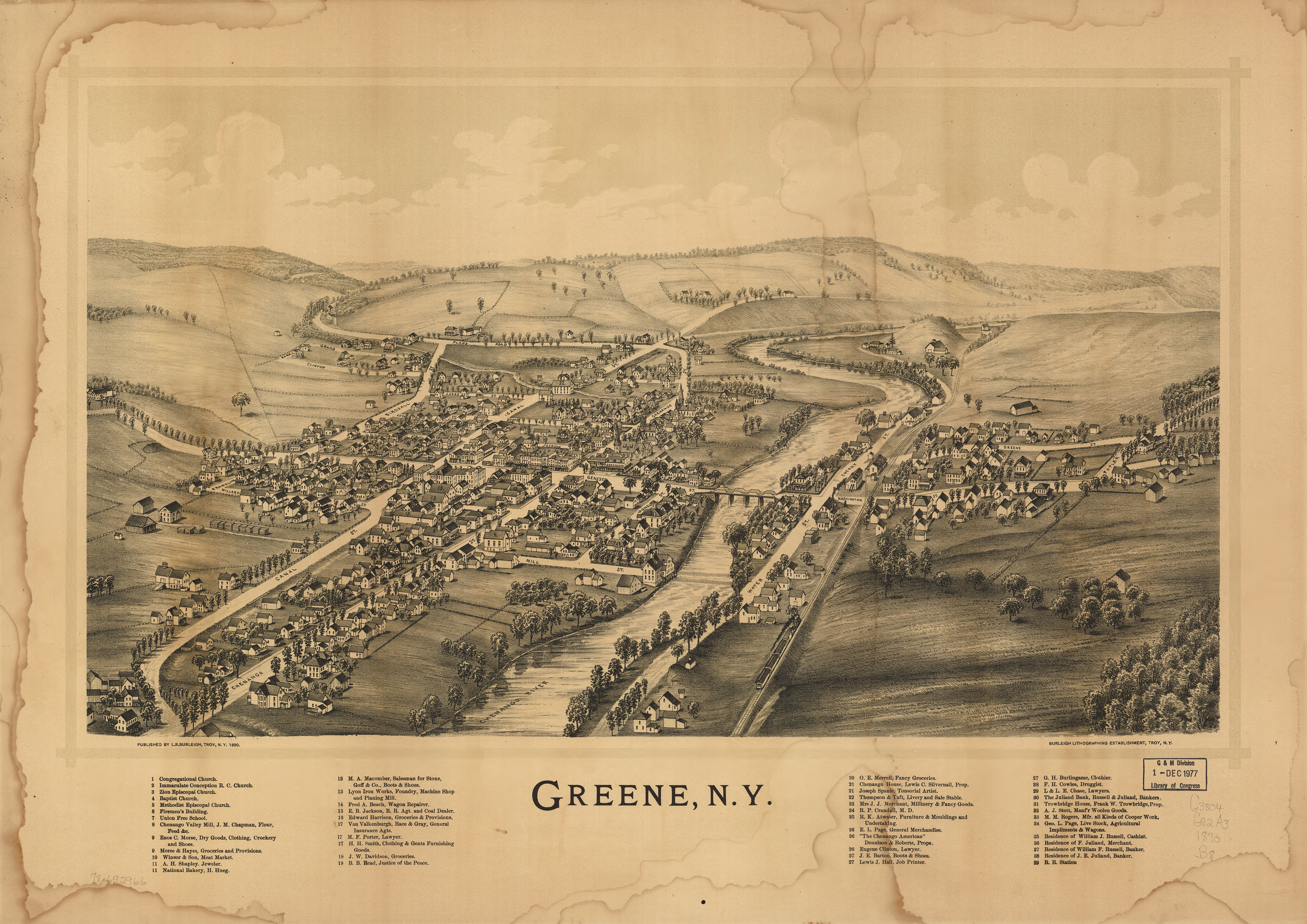
Lithograph of Greene published by L.R. Burleigh 1890 with list of landmarks

The town was originally known as Hornby, but was changed to Greene in honor of General Nathanael Greene, a hero of the American Revolution.

The town was formed from the towns of Bainbridge and Union (Broome County) in 1798. More was added to Greene from Bainbridge (then "Jericho") in 1799. The town was later reduced by the formation of new towns: Coventry (1806) and Smithville (1808). More of Greene was taken to form part of the town of Barker in 1840, and another part of Greene was added to Coventry in 1843.

In 1842, the village of Greene was incorporated within the town.

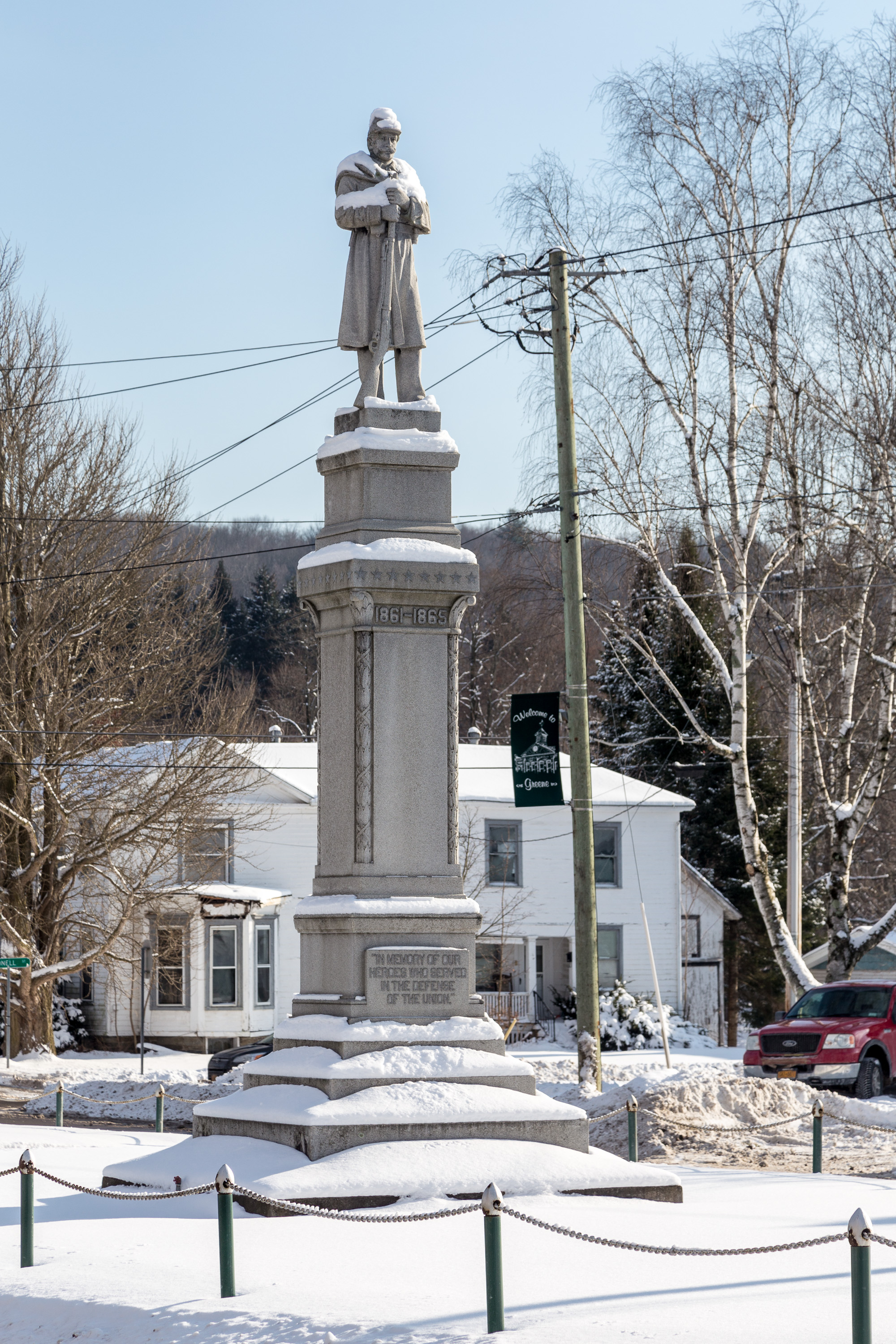
Civil War Memorial

About two dozen men from Greene enlisted during the Civil War.

The former Chenango Canal (1837) helped build the town's commerce until replaced by the railroad, which was in turn replaced by Route 12 and State Highway 206.

In 1945 the Gross Flat flying field was purchased by Robert Barrows and the Greene Airport was established. The airport is still in operation and is located on 173 Airport Road. Boasting one of the longest and widest grass strips in the area, it is frequented by pilots in training. It is open to the public and has a local CFII instructor and a certified A&P. The Greene Airport also has a live updating weather station that sends data to the National Weather Service.

The Chenango River Theatre was founded in Greene in 2006 by a committee dedicated to the concept of establishing a professional, non-profit theatre to help attract tourists to Greene and Chenango County. That committee evolved into a Board of Directors, who selected Bill Lelbach as the company's initial Artistic and Managing Director. They are now in their 15th season (2021), with Zach Curtis taking over for 2022 as Producing Artistic Director from the retiring Lelbach. They are still one of the relatively few Equity theatres in the country able to survive in a strictly rural environment.

The landmark Sherwood Hotel, recently reopened, is claimed to be haunted, due to the ever-present ghost of Viola, a wartime widow who hung herself with rope from the upper balcony. In 1910, then 20-year-old Viola, daughter of a local cattle rancher, had married the son of the wealthy Juliand family, Donovan. The couple had thirteen children together, until, in 1917, Donovan Juliand shipped out for the European theater of World War One. Though Donovan allegedly wrote Viola each day for every day of 1917, always proclaiming his longing to return to her and their children, he never made it home, and Viola, heartbroken and lovesick, eventually took her own life by hanging herself where she worked.

== Geography ==
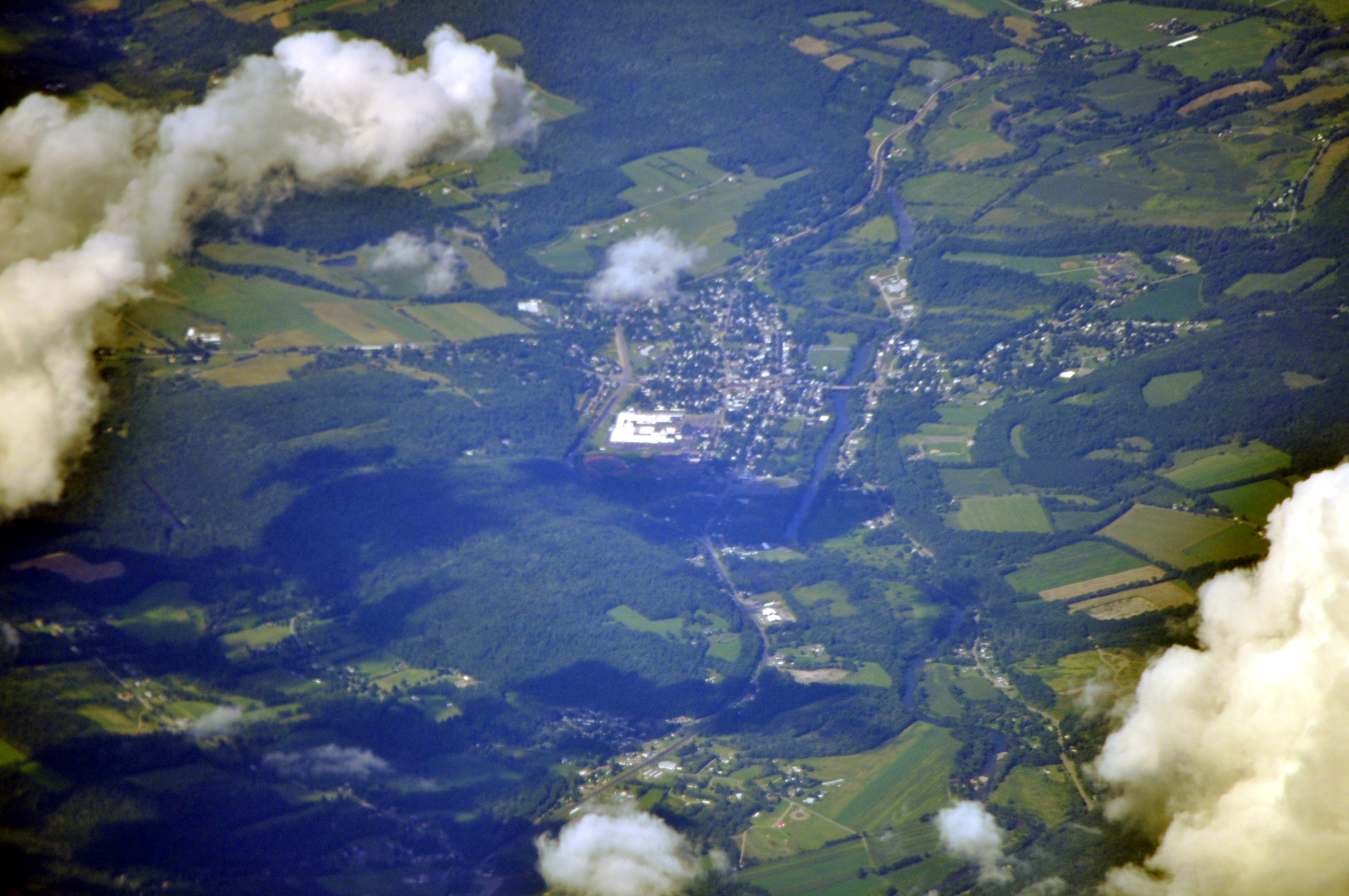
Aerial view of Greene from the south, 2013. The Chenango River can be seen running roughly north-south in the eastern part of town.

According to the United States Census Bureau, the town has a total area of 75.6 square miles (195.9 km^{2}), of which 75.1 square miles (194.4 km^{2}) is land and 0.54 square miles (1.4 km^{2}), or 0.72%, is water. The Chenango River, a tributary of the Susquehanna River, flows southward through the town.

The western and southern town lines form the border with Broome County.

New York State Route 206, an east-west highway, intersects New York State Route 12 in Greene village.

== Demographics ==
Historical population
Census	Pop.	Note	%±
1820	2,590		—
1830	2,962		14.4%
1840	3,462		16.9%
1850	3,763		8.7%
1860	3,809		1.2%
1870	3,537		−7.1%
1880	3,378		−4.5%
1890	3,164		−6.3%
1900	3,152		−0.4%
1910	2,992		−5.1%
1920	2,917		−2.5%
1930	3,048		4.5%
1940	3,188		4.6%
1950	3,712		16.4%
1960	4,624		24.6%
1970	5,347		15.6%
1980	5,729		7.1%
1990	6,053		5.7%
2000	5,729		−5.4%
2010	5,604		−2.2%
2020	5,296		−5.5%
U.S. Decennial Census

As of the census of 2000, there were 5,729 people, 2,275 households, and 1,540 families residing in the town. The population density was 76.2 inhabitants per square mile (29.4/km^{2}). There were 2,550 housing units at an average density of 33.9 per square mile (13.1/km^{2}). The racial makeup of the town was 98.53% White, 0.24% Black or African American, 0.28% Native American, 0.26% Asian, 0.02% Pacific Islander, 0.07% from other races, and 0.59% from two or more races. Hispanic or Latino of any race were 0.58% of the population.

There were 2,275 households, out of which 32.7% had children under the age of 18 living with them, 53.8% were married couples living together, 9.4% had a female householder with no husband present, and 32.3% were non-families. 26.1% of all households were made up of individuals, and 11.8% had someone living alone who was 65 years of age or older. The average household size was 2.51 and the average family size was 3.01.

In the town, the population was spread out, with 26.5% under the age of 18, 6.9% from 18 to 24, 27.5% from 25 to 44, 25.6% from 45 to 64, and 13.5% who were 65 years of age or older. The median age was 39 years. For every 100 females, there were 96.8 males. For every 100 females age 18 and over, there were 94.4 males.

The median income for a household in the town was $38,333, and the median income for a family was $41,943. Males had a median income of $33,487 versus $22,881 for females. The per capita income for the town was $17,640. About 8.3% of families and 10.1% of the population were below the poverty line, including 14.8% of those under age 18 and 6.3% of those age 65 or over.

== Communities and locations in the Town of Greene ==
- Crestmont – A residential development off NY-206 atop Juliand Hill.
- Fickles Corner – A hamlet in the southwestern corner of Greene on NY-12.
- Genegantslet – A hamlet northwest of Greene village on NY-206.
- Greene – The village of Greene, located on NY-12 and NY-206.
- Lower Genegantslet Corner – A hamlet southwest of Greene village on NY-12.
- Quinneville – A hamlet by the southern town line on County Road 9.
