= Bainbridge (village), New York =

Bainbridge, New York
- Village
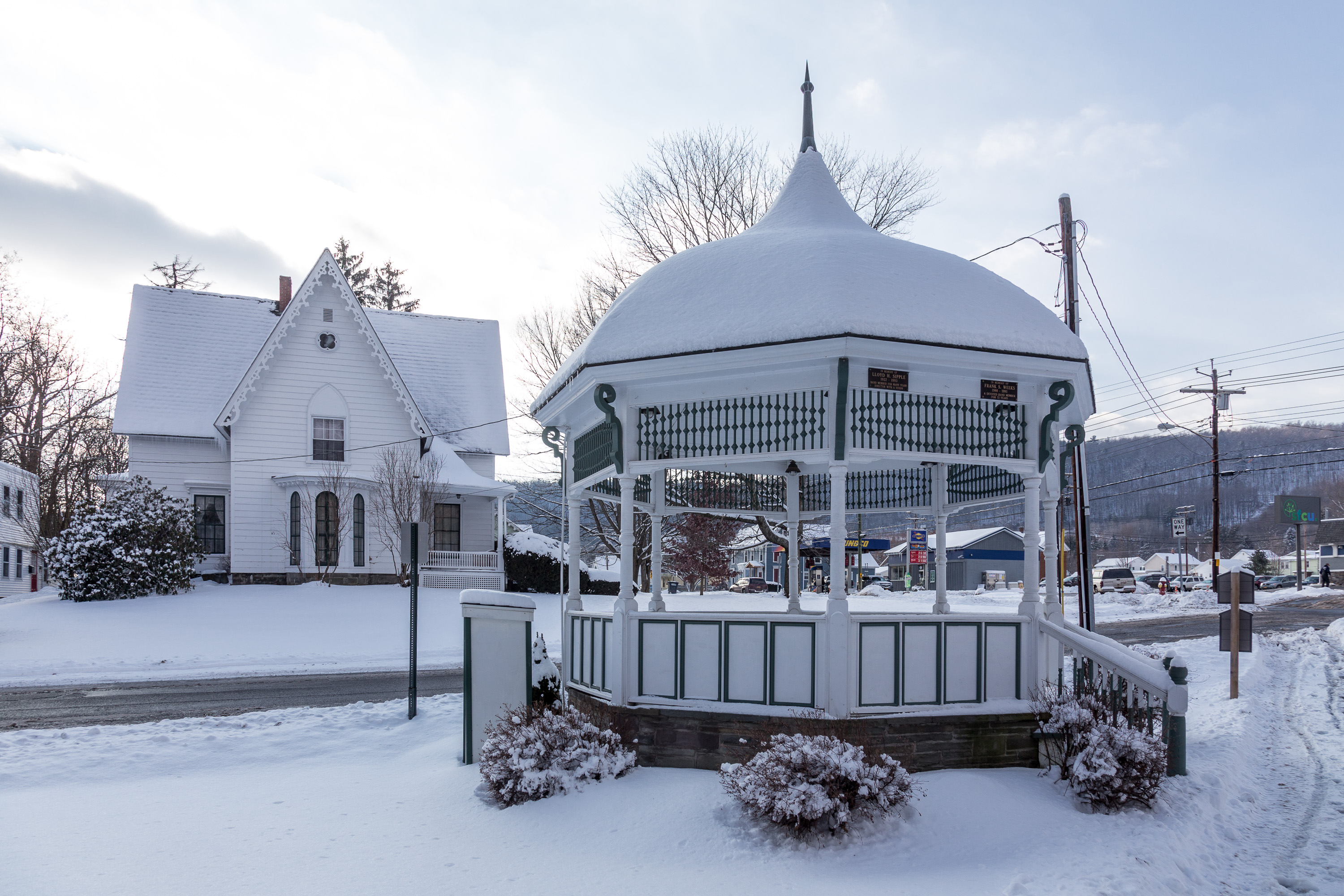
- Town common and gazebo

- Location within the state of New York
- Coordinates: 42°17′41″N 75°28′48″W
- Country: United States
- State: New York
- County: Chenango
- Town: Bainbridge

Area
  - Total: 1.36 sq mi (3.51 km^{2})
  - Land: 1.31 sq mi (3.40 km^{2})
  - Water: 0.039 sq mi (0.10 km^{2})
- Elevation: 994 ft (303 m)

Population (2020)
  - Total: 1,251
  - Density: 952.0/sq mi (367.55/km^{2})
- Time zone: UTC-5 (Eastern (EST))
  - Summer (DST): UTC-4 (EDT)
- ZIP code: 13733
- Area code: 607
- FIPS code: 36-04033
- GNIS feature ID: 0942805
- Website: www.villageofbainbridgeny.org

Bainbridge is a village in Chenango County, New York, United States. The population was 1,355 at the 2010 census. The village is at the center of the town of Bainbridge and lies between Binghamton and Oneonta.

== History ==
The first settlement of the village site took place circa 1789. The village was incorporated in 1821. It was once the home for production of Elmer's Glue. In 1982, many of its historic buildings were included in the Bainbridge Historic District on the National Register of Historic Places. The Charles C. Hovey House and Strong Leather Company Mill was listed in 1996.

In June 2006, a weather system stalled over most of the Southern Tier in New York state, causing river levels to rise dramatically. The Susquehanna River, which runs through the eastern part of the village of Bainbridge, rose to 27 feet (8.2 m), which was 14 feet (4.3 m) over the river's flood stage. Major flooding took place in the village, including the northern parts of North Main Street and the area near the town baseball field. The river stretched far up East Main Street, passing the village garage and post office. Flood waters also reached the exit and entrance to the westbound side of Interstate 88.

== Geography ==
Bainbridge is located in southeastern Chenango County at 42°17′41″N 75°28′48″W (42.294803, -75.480089).

According to the United States Census Bureau, the village has a total area of 1.3 square miles (3.3 km^{2}), of which 1.2 square miles (3.2 km^{2}) is land and 0.04 square miles (0.1 km^{2}), or 2.74%, is water.

The village is adjacent to the Susquehanna River and Interstate 88 (exit 8). NY-7 (North and South Main Street) and NY-206 (East and West Main Street) intersect at the village.

== Demographics ==
Historical population
| Census | Pop. | Note | %± |
|---|---|---|---|
| 1840 | 500 | | — |
| 1860 | 320 | | — |
| 1870 | 681 | | 112.8% |
| 1880 | 781 | | 14.7% |
| 1890 | 1,049 | | 34.3% |
| 1900 | 1,092 | | 4.1% |
| 1910 | 1,159 | | 6.1% |
| 1920 | 1,259 | | 8.6% |
| 1930 | 1,324 | | 5.2% |
| 1940 | 1,450 | | 9.5% |
| 1950 | 1,505 | | 3.8% |
| 1960 | 1,712 | | 13.8% |
| 1970 | 1,674 | | −2.2% |
| 1980 | 1,603 | | −4.2% |
| 1990 | 1,550 | | −3.3% |
| 2000 | 1,365 | | −11.9% |
| 2010 | 1,355 | | −0.7% |
| 2020 | 1,251 | | −7.7% |
U.S. Decennial Census

As of the census of 2000, there were 1,365 people, 578 households, and 354 families residing in the village. The population density was 1,064.3 inhabitants per square mile (410.9/km^{2}). There were 650 housing units at an average density of 506.8 per square mile (195.7/km^{2}). The racial makeup of the village was 98.17% White, 0.22% Black or African American, 0.37% Asian, 0.15% Pacific Islander, 0.29% from other races, and 0.81% from two or more races. Hispanic or Latino of any race were 1.17% of the population.

There were 578 households, out of which 31.0% had children under the age of 18 living with them, 47.6% were married couples living together, 10.2% had a female householder with no husband present, and 38.6% were non-families. 32.7% of all households were made up of individuals, and 13.1% had someone living alone who was 65 years of age or older. The average household size was 2.35 and the average family size was 2.99.

In the village, the population was spread out, with 26.4% under the age of 18, 8.8% from 18 to 24, 26.2% from 25 to 44, 23.5% from 45 to 64, and 15.1% who were 65 years of age or older. The median age was 38 years. For every 100 females, there were 94.7 males. For every 100 females age 18 and over, there were 89.3 males.

The median income for a household in the village was $35,231, and the median income for a family was $40,962. Males had a median income of $28,583 versus $24,091 for females. The per capita income for the village was $18,666. About 7.8% of families and 12.0% of the population were below the poverty line, including 15.2% of those under age 18 and 10.2% of those age 65 or over.

== Economy ==
The village of Bainbridge is small. Its proximity to other villages and towns, such as Oxford, Guilford, Afton, and Unadilla, and to the small cities of Sidney and Norwich, help to expand business and employment opportunities. In addition, its location on New York State Route 7 and on Interstate 88, between the regionally-important cities of Albany and Binghamton, also helps to inject a degree of stimulus into the local economy.

The village has a 7-acre (28,000 m^{2}) industrial park called the Bainbridge Business park. The park is broken up into seven lots, each 1-acre (4,000 m^{2}). An outpatient clinic for the Veterans Health Administration is among the occupants. The old Elmer's Glue plant was once a foundation of the local economy, but in its absence other businesses have had to fill the vacuum. Bainbridge is home to the executive headquarters of Conklin Fashions, one of the largest wholesale suppliers of costume jewelry and fashion accessories in the United States and an employer of several dozen local citizens.
