= Greene (village), New York =

Greene, New York
- Village
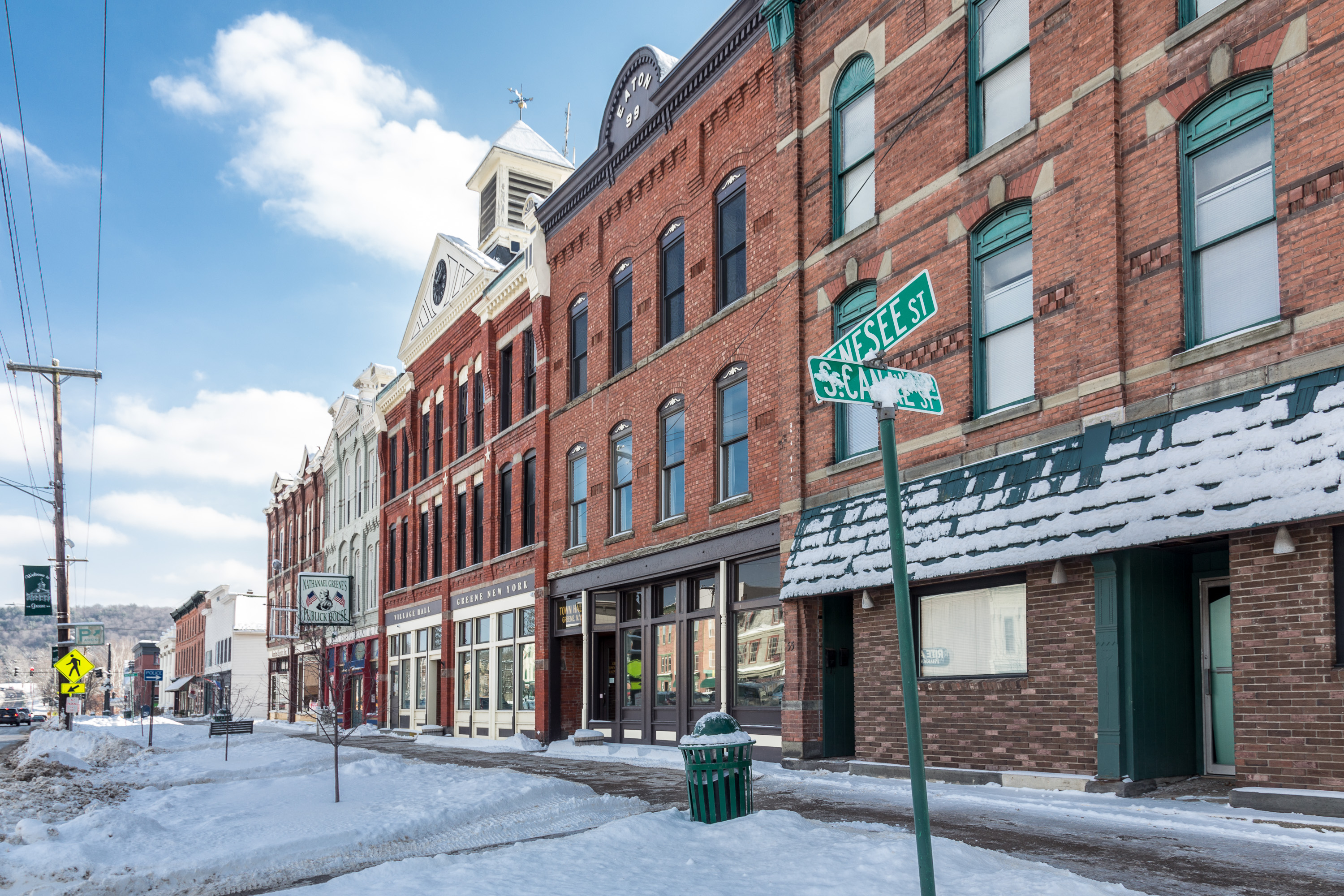
- Looking down Genesee Street

- Location within the state of New York
- Coordinates: 42°19′48″N 75°46′12″W
- Country: United States
- State: New York
- County: Chenango
- Town: Greene

Government
  - Mayor: Honorable Jessup DuMond

Area
  - Total: 1.10 sq mi (2.86 km^{2})
  - Land: 1.07 sq mi (2.77 km^{2})
  - Water: 0.039 sq mi (0.10 km^{2})
- Elevation: 920 ft (280 m)

Population (2020)
  - Total: 1,463
  - Density: 1,370.2/sq mi (529.05/km^{2})
- Time zone: UTC-5 (Eastern (EST))
  - Summer (DST): UTC-4 (EDT)
- ZIP code: 13778
- Area code: 607
- FIPS code: 36-30411
- GNIS feature ID: 0951739
- Website: www.nygreene.gov

Greene is a village in Chenango County, New York, United States. The population was 1,580 as of the 2010 census. The village is named after General Nathanael Greene. It is within the town of Greene and is northeast of Binghamton.

== History ==
The village was the site of the first settlement in the town, around 1792 by Stephen Ketchum, and was originally called "Hornby". The town later, in 1806, changed the name to that of the Revolutionary War general.

The village of Greene was laid out in 1806 and incorporated in 1842. In 1982, many of its historic buildings were included in the Greene Historic District on the National Register of Historic Places. The frequently cleansed Chenango River is a haven for wildlife, such as the great horned owl and the Virginia opossum.

== Geography ==
Greene village is located north of the geographic center of the town of Greene at 42°19′48″N 75°46′12″W (42.330073, -75.770137). It is in the southwestern part of Chenango County.

According to the United States Census Bureau, the village has a total area of 1.1 square miles (2.9 km^{2}), of which 1.1 square miles (2.8 km^{2}) is land and 0.04 square miles (0.1 km^{2}), or 3.40%, is water.

The village is on the banks of the Chenango River and was located near the former Chenango Canal. The Utica Branch of the New York, Susquehanna and Western Railway, formerly the Lackawanna Railroad, later Erie Lackawanna, later Conrail, follows the river through the area. It has been inactive since devastating floods during the summer of 2006.

New York State Route 12 and New York State Route 206 intersect in the village.

== Demographics ==
Historical population
Census	Pop.	Note	%±
1860	846		—
1870	1,025		21.2%
1880	935		−8.8%
1890	1,067		14.1%
1900	1,236		15.8%
1910	1,275		3.2%
1920	1,297		1.7%
1930	1,379		6.3%
1940	1,431		3.8%
1950	1,628		13.8%
1960	2,051		26.0%
1970	1,874		−8.6%
1980	1,747		−6.8%
1990	1,812		3.7%
2000	1,701		−6.1%
2010	1,580		−7.1%
2020	1,463		−7.4%
U.S. Decennial Census

As of the census of 2000, there were 1,701 people, 737 households, and 431 families residing in the village. The population density was 1,590.9 inhabitants per square mile (614.2/km^{2}). There were 786 housing units at an average density of 735.1 per square mile (283.8/km^{2}). The racial makeup of the village was 98.35% White, 0.29% Black or African American, 0.12% Native American, 0.41% Asian, 0.06% Pacific Islander, 0.12% from other races, and 0.65% from two or more races. Hispanic or Latino of any race were 0.59% of the population.

There were 737 households, out of which 27.1% had children under the age of 18 living with them, 43.8% were married couples living together, 11.0% had a female householder with no husband present, and 41.4% were non-families. 35.4% of all households were made up of individuals, and 16.8% had someone living alone who was 65 years of age or older. The average household size was 2.30 and the average family size was 2.98.

In the village, the population was spread out, with 24.0% under the age of 18, 8.9% from 18 to 24, 27.4% from 25 to 44, 22.3% from 45 to 64, and 17.4% who were 65 years of age or older. The median age was 38 years. For every 100 females, there were 89.0 males. For every 100 females age 18 and over, there were 83.5 males.

The median income for a household in the village was $30,833, and the median income for a family was $40,917. Males had a median income of $31,688 versus $22,188 for females. The per capita income for the village was $16,608. About 7.0% of families and 11.8% of the population were below the poverty line, including 10.5% of those under age 18 and 11.4% of those age 65 or over.

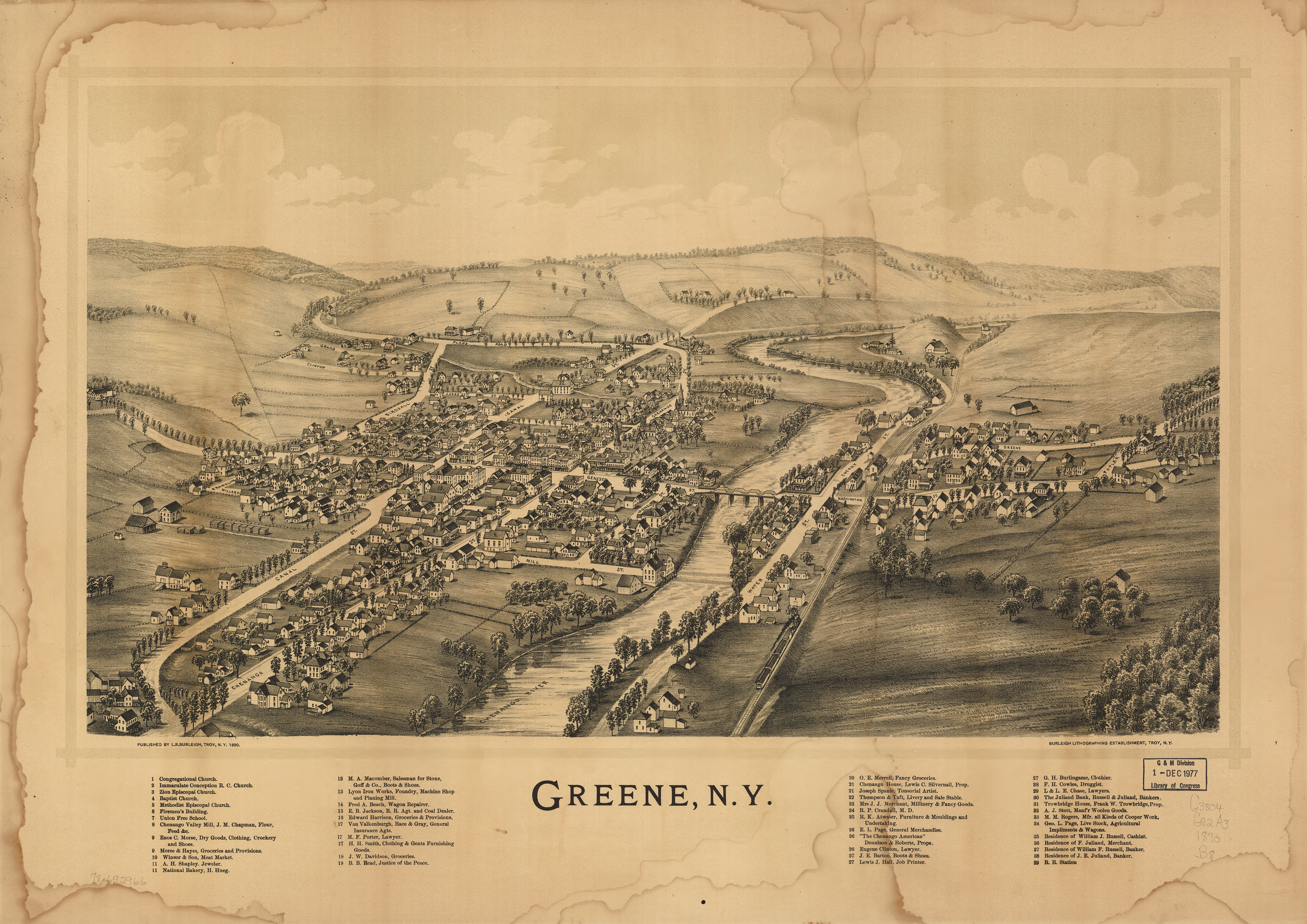
Lithograph of Greene published by L.R. Burleigh 1890 with list of landmarks
