= List of county routes in Cortland County, New York =

County routes in Cortland County, New York are not signed with route markers; however, numbers are occasionally posted on street blade signs.

== Routes 100–149 ==
Route	Length (mi)	Length (km)	From	Via	To	Notes
CR 100	4.43	7.13	NY 41 in Homer	West Scott Road	Cayuga County line in Scott (becomes CR 166)	
CR 101	3.33	5.36	NY 41	Glen Haven Road in Scott	Cayuga County line (becomes CR 66B)	
CR 101A	0.83	1.34	CR 101	Fair Haven Road in Scott	Onondaga County line	
CR 102	6.71	10.80	NY 281 in Homer	Cold Brook Road	Onondaga County line in Scott (becomes CR 25)	
CR 103	3.41	5.49	NY 281 / CR 108B	Otisco Valley Road in Preble	Onondaga County line (becomes CR 24)	
CR 104	2.58	4.15	NY 281	Song Lake Road in Preble	Onondaga County line (becomes CR 134)	
CR 105	1.23	1.98	CR 103	Song Mountain Road in Preble	CR 104	
CR 106	1.48	2.38	CR 104	Song Lake Crossing Road in Preble	US 11 / CR 106A	
CR 106A	0.63	1.01	US 11 / CR 106	Tully Center Road in Preble	NY 281	
CR 108	5.26	8.47	NY 13 in Homer	East Homer–Baltimore Road	US 11 in Preble	
CR 108A	1.40	2.25	NY 281	Steger Road in Preble	CR 103	
CR 108B	1.16	1.87	NY 281 / CR 103	Preble Road in Preble	US 11	
CR 108C	0.49	0.79	CR 114	East Homer Crossing in Homer	NY 13	
CR 109	0.68	1.09	NY 281	Little York Crossing in Homer	US 11	
CR 109A	0.72	1.16	NY 281	Little York Lake Road in Preble	NY 281	
CR 111	4.40	7.08	NY 281 in Cortlandville	Kinney Gulf Road	NY 90 in Homer	
CR 112	1.07	1.72	CR 112B / CR 113	Lighthouse Hill Road in Cortlandville	NY 13 / CR 112A	
CR 112A	0.41	0.66	NY 13 / CR 112	Loring Crossing in Cortlandville	CR 114	
CR 112B	0.07	0.11	CR 112 / CR 113	Albany Street in Cortlandville	Homer village line	
CR 113	1.01	1.63	Cortland city line	Locust Avenue in Cortlandville	CR 112 / CR 112B	
CR 114	9.19	14.79	US 11 / NY 41 in Cortlandville	East River Road	CR 600A in Truxton	
CR 114A	0.52	0.84	NY 13	East River Crossing in Homer	CR 114	
CR 114B	0.36	0.58	NY 13	Youngs Crossing in Homer	CR 114	
CR 115	0.50	0.80	NY 281	Fisher Avenue in Cortlandville	US 11 / NY 41	
CR 116	11.21	18.04	Marathon village line in Marathon	McGraw–Marathon Road	McGraw village line in Cortlandville	
CR 116A	4.33	6.97	McGraw village line in Cortlandville	McGraw North and Shippey roads	CR 114 in Homer	
CR 116B	1.04	1.67	CR 116A	Parks Road in Homer	Town Line Road	
CR 119	1.87	3.01	Tompkins County line	Sears Road in Cortlandville	NY 222	
CR 120	2.92	4.70	Tompkins County line (becomes CR 105)	Mclean Road in Cortlandville	NY 281 / CR 120B	
CR 120A	0.85	1.37	Tompkins County line	East Holl Road in Cortlandville	CR 120	
CR 120B	0.41	0.66	NY 281 / CR 120	McLean Road Extension in Cortlandville	NY 13 / CR 120C	
CR 120C	0.90	1.45	NY 13 / CR 120B	Starr Road in Cortlandville	NY 215 / CR 120D	
CR 120D	0.51	0.82	NY 215 / CR 120C	Starr Road Ext in Cortlandville	CR 120E / CR 122	
CR 120E	0.38	0.61	CR 120D / CR 122	Saunders Road in Cortlandville	Pendleton Street	
CR 121	2.54	4.09	CR 121A	Kellogg Road in Cortlandville	Cortland city line	
CR 121A	0.28	0.45	CR 121	Blodgett Mills Road in Cortlandville	US 11	
CR 122	5.62	9.04	NY 392 in Virgil	Page Green Road	Cortland city line in Cortlandville	
CR 123	4.06	6.53	CR 125 in Virgil	South Cortland–Virgil Road	NY 13 in Cortlandville	
CR 124	1.44	2.32	NY 13 / CR 124A	Gracie Road in Cortlandville	Lime Hollow Road	
CR 124A	1.61	2.59	CR 125	Webb Road in Virgil	NY 13 / CR 124	
CR 125	3.97	6.39	CR 126A	West State Road in Virgil	NY 215	
CR 126	3.50	5.63	NY 392	Gee Hill Road in Virgil	CR 126A	
CR 126A	0.23	0.37	NY 13	Old Dryden Road in Virgil	CR 125	
CR 126B	0.19	0.31	Tompkins County line	Simms Hill Road in Virgil	CR 126	
CR 127			Tompkins County line	Virgil–Dryden Road in Virgil	CR 128	Transferred to state on April 1, 1981; now part of NY 392
CR 127A	0.35	0.56	NY 392	West Meeting House Road in Virgil	CR 128A	
CR 128	0.95	1.53	CR 128A / CR 131	Owego Hill Road in Virgil	NY 392	Formerly continued north to NY 90 (now NY 215)
CR 128A	5.20	8.37	NY 38 in Harford	Daisy Hollow Road	CR 128 / CR 131 in Virgil	
CR 128B	0.19	0.31	CR 125	Washington Street in Virgil	NY 215	
CR 129	0.70	1.13	Tompkins County line	Willow Crossing in Harford	CR 128A	
CR 131	5.00	8.05	NY 221 in Harford	Babcock Hollow Road	CR 128 / CR 128A in Virgil	
CR 132	3.89	6.26	CR 133 in Lapeer	Parker Street	NY 392 in Virgil	
CR 133	4.54	7.31	NY 221	Clarks Corners Road in Lapeer	NY 221	
CR 134	3.27	5.26	CR 132 in Lapeer	Highland Road	CR 134A in Marathon	
CR 134A	0.53	0.85	CR 134	Tannery Street Extension in Marathon	Marathon village line	
CR 134B	1.60	2.57	Broome County line (becomes CR 37)	Divers Crossing in Marathon	Marathon village line	
CR 136	1.49	2.40	NY 221	Jennings Creek Road in Lapeer	Broome County line (becomes CR 156)	
CR 137	1.10	1.77	Tompkins County line (becomes CR 117)	Slaterville Road in Harford	NY 38	
CR 137A	0.92	1.48	NY 38	Cornell Lane in Harford	CR 129	

== Routes 150 and up ==
Route	Length (mi)	Length (km)	From	Via	To	Notes
CR 150	5.71	9.19	NY 13 in Truxton	Truxton–Tully Road	Onondaga County line in Preble (becomes CR 175)	
CR 151	0.28	0.45	NY 13	Prospect Street in Truxton	NY 91	
CR 152	4.81	7.74	NY 13	West Keeney Road in Cuyler	Onondaga County line (becomes CR 108)	
CR 152A	3.37	5.42	NY 13	Lincklaen Road in Cuyler	Chenango County line (becomes CR 12C)	
CR 152B	0.64	1.03	CR 152	Tripoli Road in Cuyler	NY 13	
CR 153	3.10	4.99	NY 13	High Bridge Road in Cuyler	Onondaga County line (becomes CR 126)	
CR 153A	0.36	0.58	CR 153	High Bridge Road Spur in Cuyler	NY 13	
CR 154	2.85	4.59	NY 13 in Truxton	Crains Mills Road	NY 13 in Cuyler	
CR 155	10.52	16.93	NY 26 in Taylor	Cheningo–Solon Pond Road	CR 600 / CR 600A in Truxton	
CR 156	3.39	5.46	NY 13 / CR 156B	East Keeney Road in Cuyler	Onondaga County line (becomes CR 178)	
CR 156B	0.62	1.00	NY 13	East Keeney Road Extension in Cuyler	NY 13 / CR 156	
CR 157	5.69	9.16	NY 41 in Solon	Maybury Road	CR 114 in Truxton	
CR 158	4.29	6.90	NY 26	Union Valley Road in Taylor	Chenango County line (becomes CR 12A)	
CR 159	7.77	12.50	NY 41 in Solon	Telephone Road	NY 26 / CR 159B in Cincinnatus	
CR 159A	1.16	1.87	CR 159	Hawley Woods Road in Taylor	CR 600	
CR 159B	0.31	0.50	NY 26 / CR 159	Telephone Road Ex in Cincinnatus	CR 166A / CR 166B	
CR 160	2.74	4.41	CR 116	Freetown Crossroad in Freetown	CR 161	
CR 161	5.13	8.26	CR 162	East Freetown–Texas Valley Road in Freetown	NY 41	
CR 161A	4.52	7.27	CR 161B in Marathon	Carter Slocum Road	CR 160 in Freetown	
CR 161B	2.34	3.77	NY 221 / CR 161C	Texas Valley Road in Marathon	CR 162 / CR 167	
CR 161C	3.20	5.15	Broome County line (becomes CR 152)	Merrill Creek Road in Marathon	NY 221 / CR 161B	
CR 161D	0.35	0.56	CR 161	Williwanna Avenue in Freetown	NY 41	
CR 162	4.25	6.84	CR 161B / CR 167 in Freetown	Gee Brook Road	NY 26 / NY 41 in Cincinnatus	
CR 164	1.70	2.74	CR 166	McFarlane Road in Cincinnatus	Chenango County line (becomes CR 2)	
CR 165	2.44	3.93	CR 166	Baldwin Corners Road in Cincinnatus	Chenango County line (becomes CR 6)	
CR 166	4.65	7.48	NY 26 / NY 41 in Willet	Lower Cincinnatus–Willet Road	NY 23 / CR 166A in Cincinnatus	
CR 166A	0.64	1.03	NY 23 / CR 166	Lower Cincinnat in Cincinnatus	CR 159B / CR 166B	
CR 166B	1.90	3.06	CR 159B / CR 166A	Cincinnatus Road in Cincinnatus	Chenango County line (becomes CR 11)	
CR 167	2.91	4.68	CR 161B / CR 162 in Marathon	Bloody Pond Road	NY 221 in Willet	
CR 168	2.13	3.43	NY 41 in Willet	German Road	Chenango County line in Cincinnatus (becomes CR 5)	
CR 169	3.73	6.00	NY 26	Landers Corners Road in Willet	NY 221	
CR 170	0.63	1.01	End of county maintenance	Penelope Road in Willet	NY 41	
CR 200	0.58	0.93	Tompkins County line	Old Groton Road in Cortlandville	NY 222	
CR 500	2.45	3.94	NY 13	Health Camp Road in Homer	US 11	
CR 502	2.76	4.44	NY 41	North Tower Road in Solon	End of county maintenance	
CR 600	9.56	15.39	NY 26 in Cincinnatus	Taylor Valley Road	CR 155 / CR 600A in Truxton	Formerly part of NY 91
CR 600A	4.73	7.61	CR 155 / CR 600	Cheningo Road in Truxton	NY 13	Formerly part of NY 91

== See also ==
- County routes in New York
