= Stephen Patrick (American politician) =

Member 89th State Assembly New York

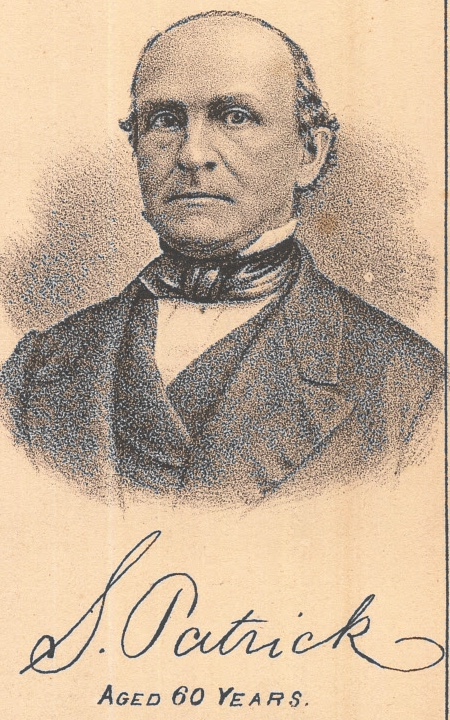
Sketch of Stephen Patrick from Cortland County Atlas.

Stephen Patrick (September 17, 1811 – May 9, 1890) was a state assemblyman in the 89th New York State Legislature, representing Cortland County, New York. During his term in office, he introduced a bill establishing the Cortland Savings Bank, of which he later became a charter member of the board of directors.

== Life and career ==
In 1812, Nathaniel and Penelope (Potter) Patrick moved from Saratoga County, New York, to the town of Cuyler, NY, bringing with them their son, Stephen, who had been born September 17 the year before. The town of Cuyler had only been settled a few years before, thus making the family one of the earliest settlers to the area. The family prospered; Nathaniel and Penelope took up farming, and had 14 children, of which Stephen was the first. By all accounts, the elder Stephen was a bright student, taking an early interest in history as well as current events. He received his instruction from the district school, and later taught classes as a youth. In 1833, he went to Kingston, New York, and took a position with the Delaware & Hudson Canal Company, working 6 seasons, while teaching school in the winter. While in Kingston, he met Angeline Dickerson, daughter of Jesse and Matilda (McLaren) Dickerson, and was married on April 13, 1836. He returned in 1838 to settle in the nearby town of Truxton, NY, where he purchased a plot of land, built a house, and took up farming.

Patrick remained active in the community, both in education and politics. He was a member of the school committee, giving examinations to future teachers, granting certificates, and visiting the schoolhouses. He was known very early on as an orator and made his political associations clear; as early as 1832, he was involved in the organization of the Whig party. In 1854, Patrick was among the first to establish the Republican Party in the county. He served one term as supervisor in 1860, and served in successive years as assessor of the county. His political career culminated in his election to the New York State Assembly in 1865. He served his district and the state well, serving on the standing committee on charitable and religious societies, and introduced bills during his tenure for the repair of roads, the granting of land bounties, social and sporting clubs, and various other acts. His most notable bill was an act calling for the charter of the Cortland Savings Bank in Cortland, NY. He became a director of the bank upon his departure from the State Assembly, and remained associated with the bank throughout his life. He remained politically active, as representative of his district in State conventions.

Meanwhile, his farm continued to prosper; his property had grown to a respectable 200 acres (81 ha), and he had a thriving dairy concern. Stephen and Angeline were active in the Methodist church, having been a founding member of the church in Truxton. The first three of their 11 children, Fanny, Harriet, and Adam, all died young. However, Alvah, John Wesley, Harriet M, Richard, Eliza, Nathaniel, and Penelope Patrick all had long and healthy lives. When Stephen approached his retiring years, he gave the farm to his son John, but continued to live on the property. Far from retiring, he took up yet another career as a representative of several fire and life insurance agencies, and likely found no lack of customers, given his continued association with the bank. After a brief illness, Stephen Patrick died in his home on May 9, 1890. He is buried in the Truxton Rural Cemetery in Truxton. Angeline continued on with the family, eventually moving to Manlius, NY, where she died on December 23, 1906. She is buried at the same location.
