= New York State Route 281 =

State highway in central New York, US

New York State Route 281
- Map of central New York with NY 281 highlighted in red

Route information
- Maintained by NYSDOT and the city of Cortland
- Length: 16.56 mi (26.65 km)
- Existed: c. 1931–present

Major junctions
- South end: NY 13 in Cortlandville
- NY 90 in Homer; I-81 in Preble
- North end: US 11 / NY 80 near Tully

Location
- Country: United States
- State: New York
- Counties: Cortland, Onondaga

Highway system
- New York Highways; Interstate; US; State; Reference; Parkways
← I-281	→ NY 282

New York State Route 281 (NY 281) is a north–south state highway in central New York in the United States. It extends for 16.56 miles (26.65 km) across Cortland and Onondaga counties. The southern terminus of the route is at an intersection with NY 13 in the town of Cortlandville. Its northern terminus is at a junction with U.S. Route 11 and NY 80 near the village of Tully. NY 281 meets NY 90 in the village of Homer and connects to Interstate 81 twice. The route parallels I-81 for all but the southernmost 2.5 miles (4.0 km) of its routing.

== Route description ==
=== Cortlandville to Homer ===
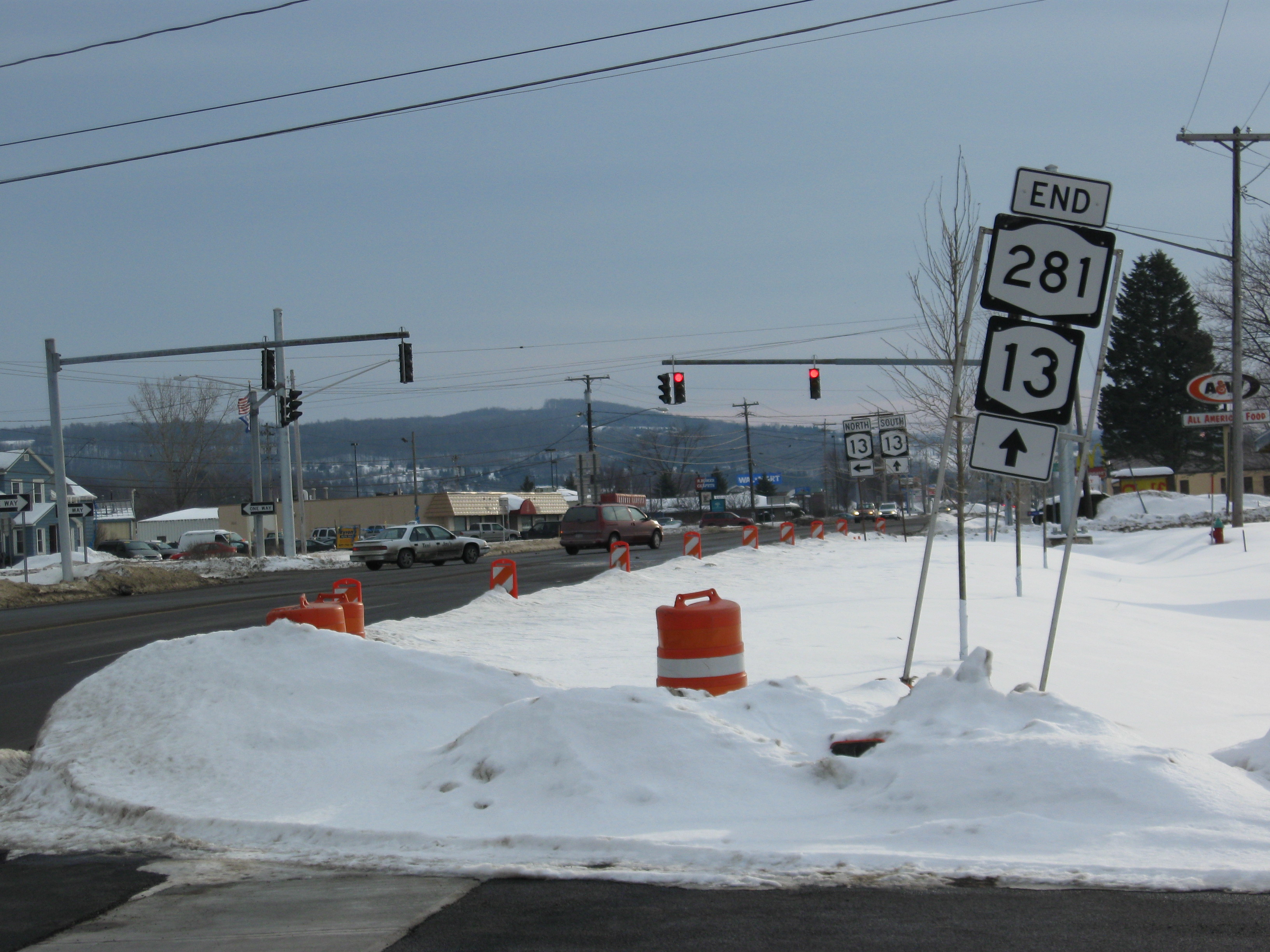
NY 281 southbound at its terminus with NY 13 in the town of Cortlandville

NY 281 begins at an intersection with NY 13 (Tompkins Street Ext) in the town of Cortlandville, in front of the A&W Restaurant. NY 281 proceeds north on the former West Road, a four-lane commercial roadway through Cortlandville, soon intersecting with County Route 120 (CR 120; McLean Road). Retaining the commercial design, NY 281 crosses over the abandoned Lehigh Valley railroad line, passing west of SUNY Cortland. The route continues northeast, passing east of the Cortland County–Chase Field Airport. Soon NY 281 passes Luker Rd and then enters an at-grade interchange with NY 222 and soon after an intersection with CR 111 (Kinney Gulf Road).

After CR 111, NY 281 continues northeast as a four-lane roadway through Cortlandville, crossing into the city of Cortland for a short distance near St. Mary's Cemetery. NY 281 returns to a two-lane road and bends north at Wheeler Avenue. Near Bellevue Ave, NY 281 crosses out of Cortland and returns to Cortlandville. A short distance after the city line, NY 281 intersects with CR 115 (Fisher Avenue). The route remains residential for a distance, passing west of Cortland Country Club. Just after, the route enters an at-grade interchange with unsigned NY 930Q, which connects to I-81 at Exit 54.

Just north of New York State Route 930Q, NY 281 enters the village of Homer and runs concurrently with a village roadway named South West Street. The route passes east of Glenwood Cemetery, intersecting with NY 90 (Cayuga Street). NY 281 continues north through Homer, remaining a two-lane residential road. Near Grove Street, the route changes monikers to North West Street, crossing through a dense stretch of residences. After turning northeast, NY 281 intersects at-grade with NY 41 (Clinton Street), before continuing to Stanford Drive, which marks the end of the village of Homer. Back in the town of Homer, the route proceeds northeast through a rural stretch of Cortland County, winding northeast into a parallel with I-81.

=== Homer to Tully ===
NY 281 continues north through Homer, passing a stretch of residences before an intersection with CR 102 (Cold Brook Road). Passing west of Lower Little York Lake, NY 281 enters the hamlet of Pratts Corners, where it becomes a two-lane residential street, intersecting with CR 109 (Little York Crossing Road). After CR 109, the route runs west of Upper Little York Lake, passing multiple homes and fields near the lakeside before intersecting with CR 109A (Little York Lake Road). After several blocks of paralleling, CR 109A bends back and terminates at NY 281 to the north. At that point, the route crosses into the town of Preble.

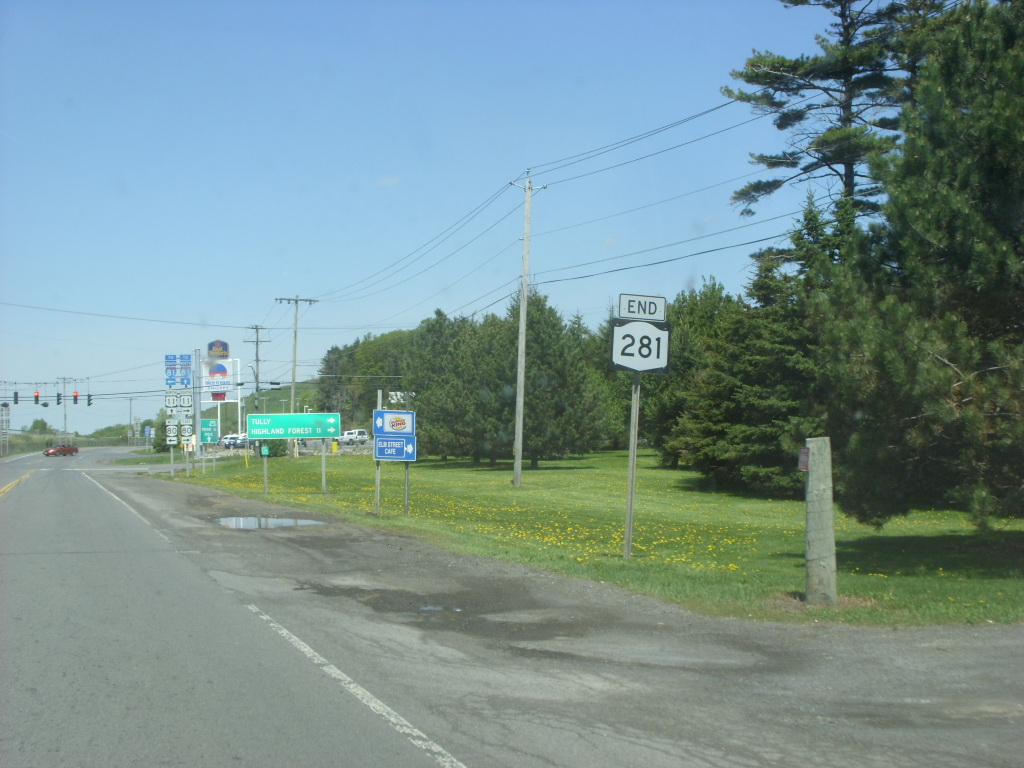
NY 281 northbound at the intersection with US 11 and NY 80 in Tully

In Preble, NY 281 proceeds northeast at a fork that serves as the southern terminus of CR 108A (Steger Road). NY 281 and CR 108A parallel, with the route coming within a mile (1.6 km) of I-81. A short distance to the north, the route enters the hamlet of Preble, with NY 281 becoming a two-lane residential street. Intersecting CR 108B (Preble Road), NY 281 bends northeast at another fork, this time with CR 104 (Song Lake Road). On this northeastern stretch, the route enters a diamond interchange with I-81 (exit 63). After I-81, NY 281 continues northeast for a short distance through Preble, turning north on a parallel of the northbound lanes of I-81.

Now paralleling a railroad line, NY 281 intersects with CR 106 (Song Lake Crossing Road). Soon after intersecting with CR 106A (Tully Center Road), NY 281 turns northwest, crossing the county line into Onondaga County. Right at the county line, NY 281 intersects with CR 257 (Marybelle Road), now in the town of Tully. The route bends northward, intersecting with CR 134 (Meeting House Road) as a two-lane rural road. A short distance to the north, I-81's exit 67 intersects with NY 281, which serves as a frontage road to an intersection with NY 80 and US 11. This intersection serves as the northern terminus of NY 281, while the right-of-way continues north as US 11.

== History ==
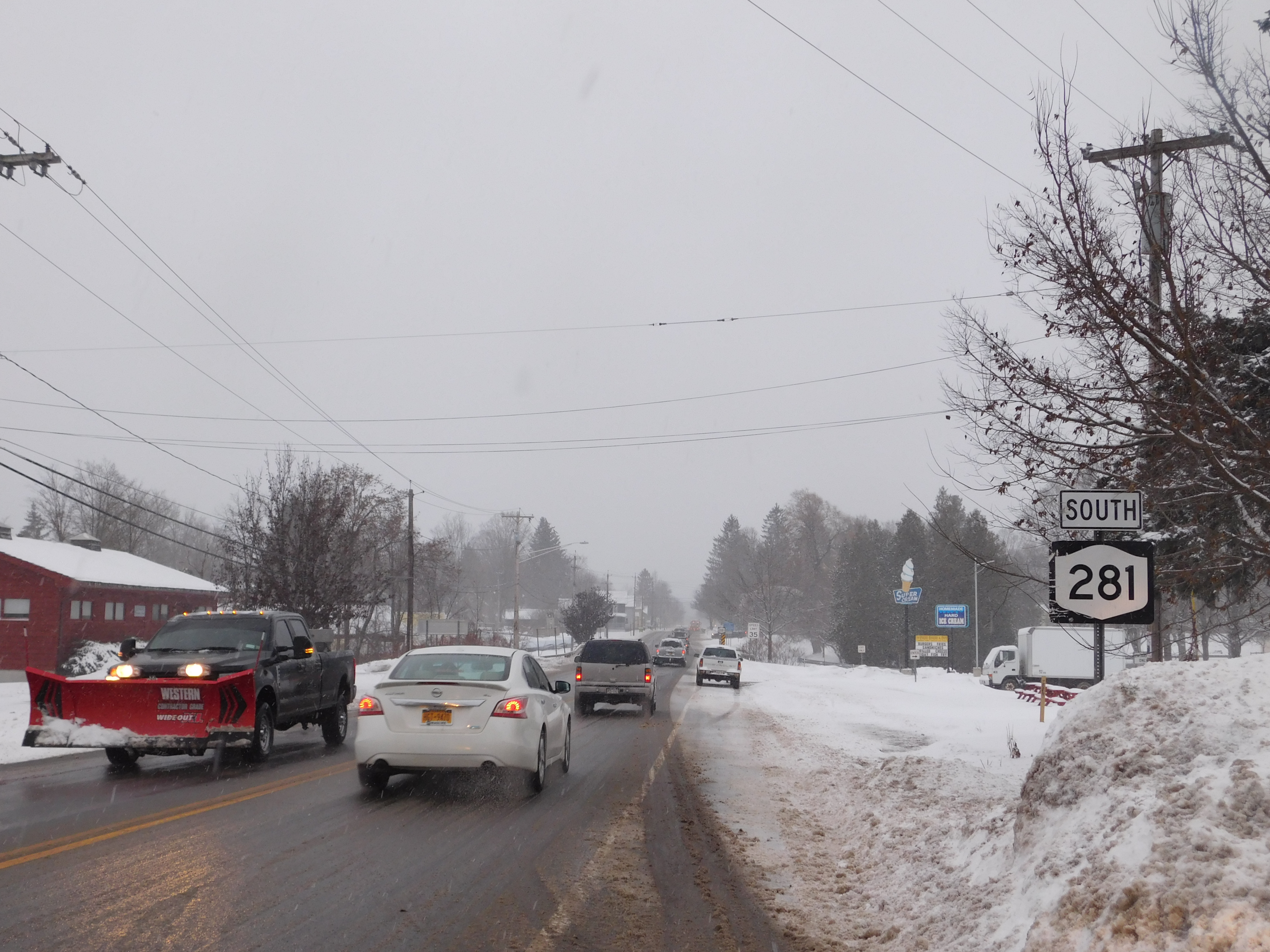
NY 281 southbound in Homer

NY 281 was assigned c. 1931 to the portion of its alignment between NY 90 in the village of Homer and the hamlet of Preble. In the vicinity of Preble, it initially used modern County Routes 108A and 108B to reach U.S. Route 11. The route was extended northward along the western edge of Tully Lake c. 1933, following Song Lake and Long Roads to a junction with NY 80 west of Tully Center. It was extended southward to NY 13 in the town of Cortlandville at some point between 1934 and 1940. In the late 1940s, construction began on a new highway between Preble and Tully Center that bypassed Preble and Tully Lake to the east. It was completed by 1949, at which time it became part of a realigned NY 281.

In February 1965, the New York State Department of Public Works proposed to renumber NY 281 as NY 357 to eliminate confusion between I-81, NY 80, NY 181 and US 11, aside of Interstate 281. The state would be asking communities along NY 281 for their approval to make the change. On March 8, 1965, the Board of Directors of the Cortland County Chamber of Commerce voted unanimously to oppose the renumbering, following actions of the Cortland County Motel Association, who mounted an even larger opposition. On March 30, it was announced that the decision to renumber NY 281 was withdrawn citing massive opposition.

== Major intersections ==
County	Location	mi	km	Destinations	Notes
Cortland	Cortlandville	0.00	0.00	NY 13 (Tompkins Street) – Cortland, Ithaca	Southern terminus; hamlet of Munsons Corners
Cortland	Cortlandville	1.61	2.59	NY 222 – Groton, Cortland	Community of Cortland West
Cortland	Cortlandville	3.80	6.12	NY 930Q to I-81 – Syracuse, Binghamton	Exit 54 (I-81) via unsigned NY 930Q
Cortland	Village of Homer	4.22	6.79	NY 90 (Cayuga Street) to Main Street – Locke, Fillmore Glen	
Cortland	Village of Homer	4.99	8.03	NY 41 (Clinton Street) to Main Street – Skaneateles	
Cortland	Preble	12.69	20.42	I-81 – Syracuse, Binghamton	Exit 63 (I-81)
Onondaga	Town of Tully	16.56	26.65	US 11 / NY 80 to I-81 – Tully	Northern terminus; Exit 67 (I-81)
1.000 mi = 1.609 km; 1.000 km = 0.621 mi
