= Freetown, New York =

- Town
- Location within Cortland County and New York

- Location in the United States Freetown (New York)
- Coordinates: 42°31′58″N 76°0′57″W
- Country: United States
- State: New York
- County: Cortland

Government
  - Type: Town Council
  - Town Supervisor: Thomas Vanderploeg (Conservative)
  - Town Council: Members' List: • Mary Mackey ([Independent]); •William Contri (R); • Robert Stewart(R); • Crystal Clough (R)

Area
  - Total: 25.63 sq mi (66.38 km^{2})
  - Land: 25.49 sq mi (66.01 km^{2})
  - Water: 0.14 sq mi (0.37 km^{2})
- Elevation: 1,565 ft (477 m)

Population (2010)
  - Total: 757
  - Estimate (2016): 765
  - Density: 30.0/sq mi (11.59/km^{2})
- Time zone: UTC-5 (Eastern (EST))
  - Summer (DST): UTC-4 (EDT)
- ZIP Codes: 13803 (Marathon); 13040 (East Freetown); 13101 (McGraw)
- Area code: 607
- FIPS code: 36-023-27496
- GNIS feature ID: 0978974
- Website: freetownny.org

Freetown is a town in Cortland County, New York, United States. The population was 757 at the 2010 census. Freetown is in the southeastern part of the county and is southeast of Cortland.

== History ==
Freetown was in the former Central New York Military Tract within a tract township called "Cincinnatus".

The region was first settled circa 1800.

Freetown was formed from part of the town of Cincinnatus in 1818. In 1820, the town was increased in size by an addition from the town of Virgil.

== Geography ==
According to the United States Census Bureau, Freetown has a total area of 25.6 square miles (66.4 km^{2}), of which 25.5 square miles (66.0 km^{2}) is land and 0.15 square miles (0.4 km^{2}), or 0.55%, is water.

New York State Route 41 crosses the northeastern part of Freetown. The town drains to the Otselic River to the east and the Tioughnioga River to the west, but both rivers are outside the town boundaries. The entire town is part of the Susquehanna River watershed.

== Demographics ==
Historical population
Census	Pop.	Note	%±
1820	663		—
1830	1,051		58.5%
1840	950		−9.6%
1850	955		0.5%
1860	981		2.7%
1870	906		−7.6%
1880	844		−6.8%
1890	677		−19.8%
1900	610		−9.9%
1910	551		−9.7%
1920	485		−12.0%
1930	418		−13.8%
1940	510		22.0%
1950	534		4.7%
1960	542		1.5%
1970	522		−3.7%
1980	572		9.6%
1990	688		20.3%
2000	789		14.7%
2010	757		−4.1%
2016 (est.)	765		1.1%
U.S. Decennial Census

As of the census of 2000, there were 789 people, 267 households, and 206 families residing in the town. The population density was 30.9 inhabitants per square mile (11.9/km^{2}). There were 321 housing units at an average density of 12.6 per square mile (4.9/km^{2}). The racial makeup of the town was 98.35% White, 0.13% African American, 0.13% Native American, and 1.39% from two or more races.

There were 267 households, out of which 39.7% had children under the age of 18 living with them, 64.8% were married couples living together, 6.7% had a female householder with no husband present, and 22.5% were non-families. 14.6% of all households were made up of individuals, and 4.1% had someone living alone who was 65 years of age or older. The average household size was 2.96 and the average family size was 3.20.

In the town, the population was spread out, with 31.4% under the age of 18, 6.7% from 18 to 24, 30.8% from 25 to 44, 22.4% from 45 to 64, and 8.6% who were 65 years of age or older. The median age was 34 years. For every 100 females, there were 116.2 males. For every 100 females age 18 and over, there were 106.5 males.

The median income for a household in the town was $34,327, and the median income for a family was $36,477. Males had a median income of $26,339 versus $14,946 for females. The per capita income for the town was $12,969. About 10.0% of families and 13.3% of the population were below the poverty line, including 23.2% of those under age 18 and 12.8% of those age 65 or over.

== Communities and locations in Freetown ==
- East Freetown – a hamlet on NY Route 41 in the northeastern part of the town
- Freetown Corners – a hamlet near the center of the town
- Galatia – a hamlet at the southern town line, south of Freetown Corners
- Texas Valley – a hamlet near the southeastern part of the town at the town line
