= New York State Route 221 =

State highway in Cortland County, New York, US

New York State Route 221
- Map of Cortland County and vicinity with NY 221 highlighted in red and NY 200 highlighted in blue

Route information
- Maintained by NYSDOT
- Length: 18.71 mi (30.11 km)
- Existed: 1930–present

Major junctions
- West end: NY 38 in Harford
- I-81 in Marathon
- East end: NY 26 / NY 41 in Willet

Location
- Country: United States
- State: New York
- Counties: Cortland

Highway system
- New York Highways; Interstate; US; State; Reference; Parkways
← NY 220	→ NY 222
← NY 199	NY 200	→ NY 201

New York State Route 221 (NY 221) is a state highway in Cortland County, New York, in the United States. Its western terminus is at an intersection with NY 38 in the town of Harford. The eastern terminus is at a junction with NY 26 and NY 41 in the town of Willet. Near its western end, NY 221 intersects New York State Route 200. Together, NY 200 and NY 221 form a loop route off NY 38 between the hamlets of Harford and Harford Mills within the town of Harford. NY 221 originally followed modern NY 200 and ended at U.S. Route 11 (US 11) in Marathon when it was assigned as part of the 1930 renumbering of state highways in New York. It was extended to its present length by the following year and realigned to serve Harford later in the decade. NY 200 was assigned in the 1940s.

== Route description ==
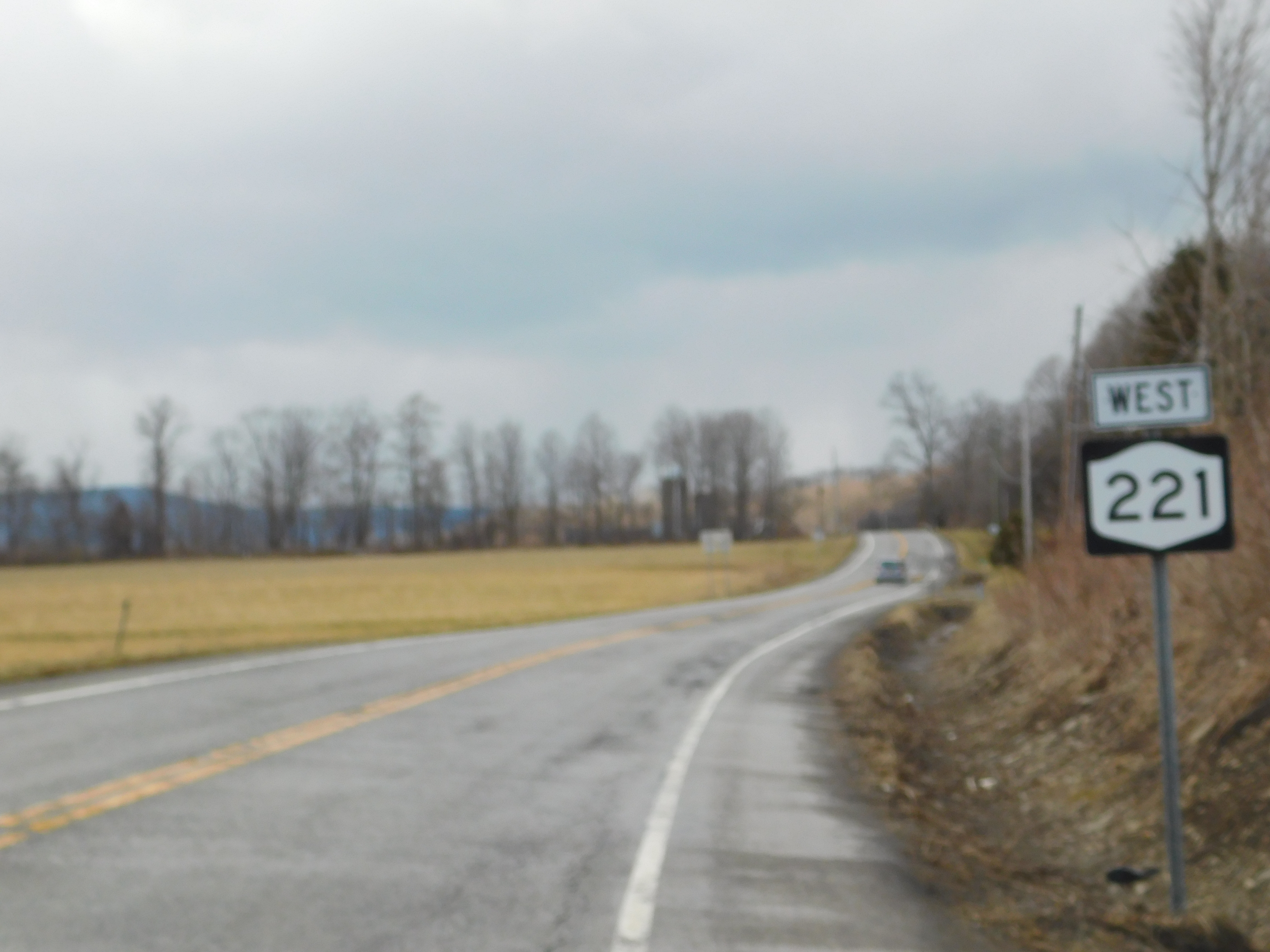
NY 221 westbound in Harford

NY 221 begins at an intersection with NY 38 in the town of Harford. The route progresses northward through a small hamlet, crossing the Owego and Harford Railway and serving a mobile home park. At the intersection with Owego Hill Road, NY 221 turns eastward as a two-lane road, where the route changes backdrops into a more rural and residential mix. After about a mile, the route intersects with NY 200, a 1.37-mile-long (2.20 km) route that connects NY 221 back to NY 38 and the hamlet of Harford Mills. At this junction, NY 221 turns north once again, while NY 200 begins on the former right-of-way used by NY 221. The surroundings remain the same as the route continues, turning to the northeast, and soon east at the junction at County Route 131 (CR 131; Babcock Hollow Road).

The rural road bends to the southeast gradually, entering the town of Lapeer, turning east again until it meets CR 133 (Clarks Corner Road). The highway soon reverts to a southeast direction, passing to the north of Beaver Pond and the county line, while NY 221 enters the hamlet of Hunts Corners and intersects with CR 136 (Jennings Creek Road). Here, NY 221 changes direction again, following a northeasterly path out of the hamlet. It bypasses the nearby hamlet of Clarks Corner and soon intersects with the eastern terminus of CR 133, which gives way to NY 221 as the state road merges with the east–west county highway. NY 221 continues on an eastward track into the town of Marathon, where it descends into the Tioughnioga River valley and enters the village of Marathon.

Within the village, the route gains the West Main Street moniker and heads through a mix of residential and commercial areas. NY 221 crosses intersections with CR 134A and CR 134B and passes the former Marathon railroad depot before crossing the New York, Susquehanna and Western Railway and the Tioughnioga River in the center of the community. After crossing the river, the renamed Main Street heads northeast through the village, intersecting with US 11 (Cortland Street) just ahead of an interchange with Interstate 81 (I-81) at the latter's exit 9. After the exit from I-81, NY 221 reenters another rural area and turns eastward past Dean Pond. After intersecting with CR 161B (Texas Valley Road) and CR 161C (Merrill Creek Road), NY 221 crosses Merrill Creek and winds through farmland. Entering the town of Willet, NY 221 crosses the southern terminus of CR 167 (Bloody Pond Road) and makes a gradual curve to the north while intersecting with CR 169 (Landers Corners Road). NY 221 continues north to the hamlet of Willet, where it ends at an intersection with NY 26 and NY 41.

== History ==
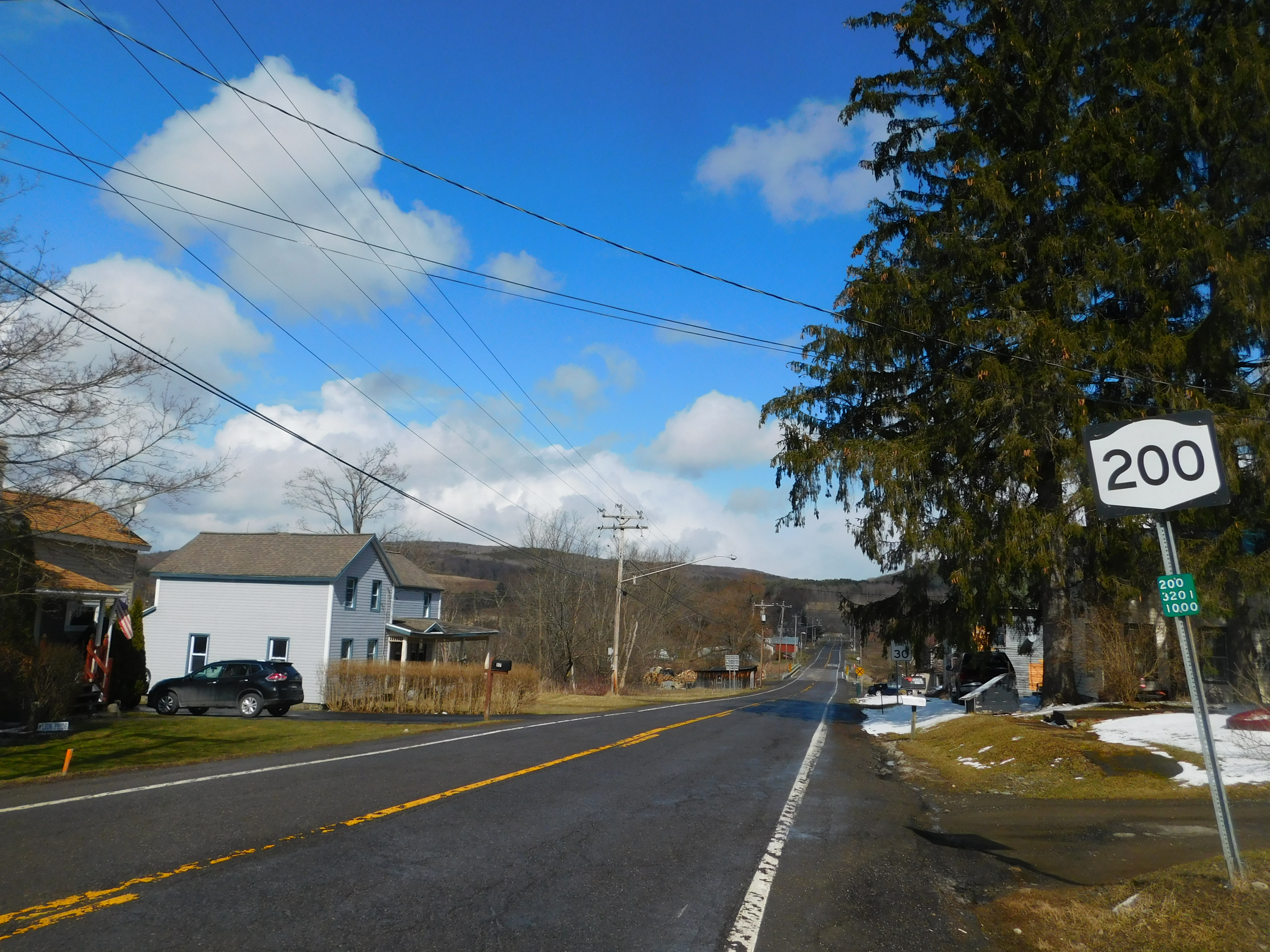
NY 200 heading through Harford Mills

The state of New York assumed maintenance of two highways linking the hamlets of Harford and Harford Mills—one directly connecting the two and a second, more circuitous route to the east—in the early 20th century. The direct route and most of the loop road were improved to state highway standards as part of a project contracted out on October 16, 1914, and were added to the state highway system on December 10, 1915, as State Highway 1075 (SH 1075). Each end of SH 1075 connected to the segment of the loop route between modern NY 38 and Owego Hill Road, which was rebuilt as part of an earlier project awarded on September 19, 1906, and included in the state highway system on July 5, 1908, as SH 379. Both designations are unsigned and used only for inventory purposes.

In the 1930 renumbering of state highways in New York, the south half of the loop road became part of NY 221, a new route extending from NY 38 at Harford Mills to US 11 in the village of Marathon. NY 221 was extended east to its current eastern terminus in Willet by the following year. The portion of the route between the Harford loop road and Willet utilized a highway added to the state highway system sometime after 1926. NY 221 was rerouted to follow its current alignment to the hamlet of Harford in the mid-1930s, and its former routing to Harford Mills was redesignated as NY 200 in the 1940s.

== Major intersections ==
=== NY 221 ===
The entire route is in Cortland County.

Location	mi	km	Destinations	Notes
Harford	0.00	0.00	NY 38 – Harford Mills, Dryden	Western terminus
Harford	1.37	2.20	NY 200 south	Northern terminus of NY 200
Village of Marathon	11.58	18.64	US 11 (Cortland Street) to I-81 south – Binghamton	
Village of Marathon	11.68	18.80	I-81 north – Syracuse	Exit 39 (I-81)
Willet	18.71	30.11	NY 26 / NY 41 – Cortland, Willet, Greene	Eastern terminus
1.000 mi = 1.609 km; 1.000 km = 0.621 mi

=== NY 200 ===
The entire route is in Harford, Cortland County.

mi	km	Destinations	Notes
0.00	0.00	NY 38	Southern terminus
1.37	2.20	NY 221	Northern terminus
1.000 mi = 1.609 km; 1.000 km = 0.621 mi
