= New York State Route 222 =

State highway in central New York, US

New York State Route 222
- Map of Cortland and Tompkins counties with NY 222 highlighted in red

Route information
- Maintained by NYSDOT and the city of Cortland
- Length: 10.57 mi (17.01 km)
- Existed: 1930–present

Major junctions
- West end: NY 38 in Groton
- East end: US 11 / NY 13 / NY 41 in Cortland

Location
- Country: United States
- State: New York
- Counties: Tompkins, Cortland

Highway system
- New York Highways; Interstate; US; State; Reference; Parkways
← NY 221	→ NY 223

New York State Route 222 (NY 222) is a 10.57-mile-long (17.01 km) east–west state highway in central New York in the United States. It runs from an intersection with NY 38 in the village of Groton in northeastern Tompkins County to a junction with the conjoined routes of U.S. Route 11, NY 13, and NY 41 in the city of Cortland in western Cortland County. NY 222 passes through the town of Cortlandville, where it intersects NY 281 and serves Cortland County–Chase Field Airport. The road was acquired by the state of New York in the early 20th century and designated NY 222 as part of the 1930 renumbering of state highways in New York.

== Route description ==
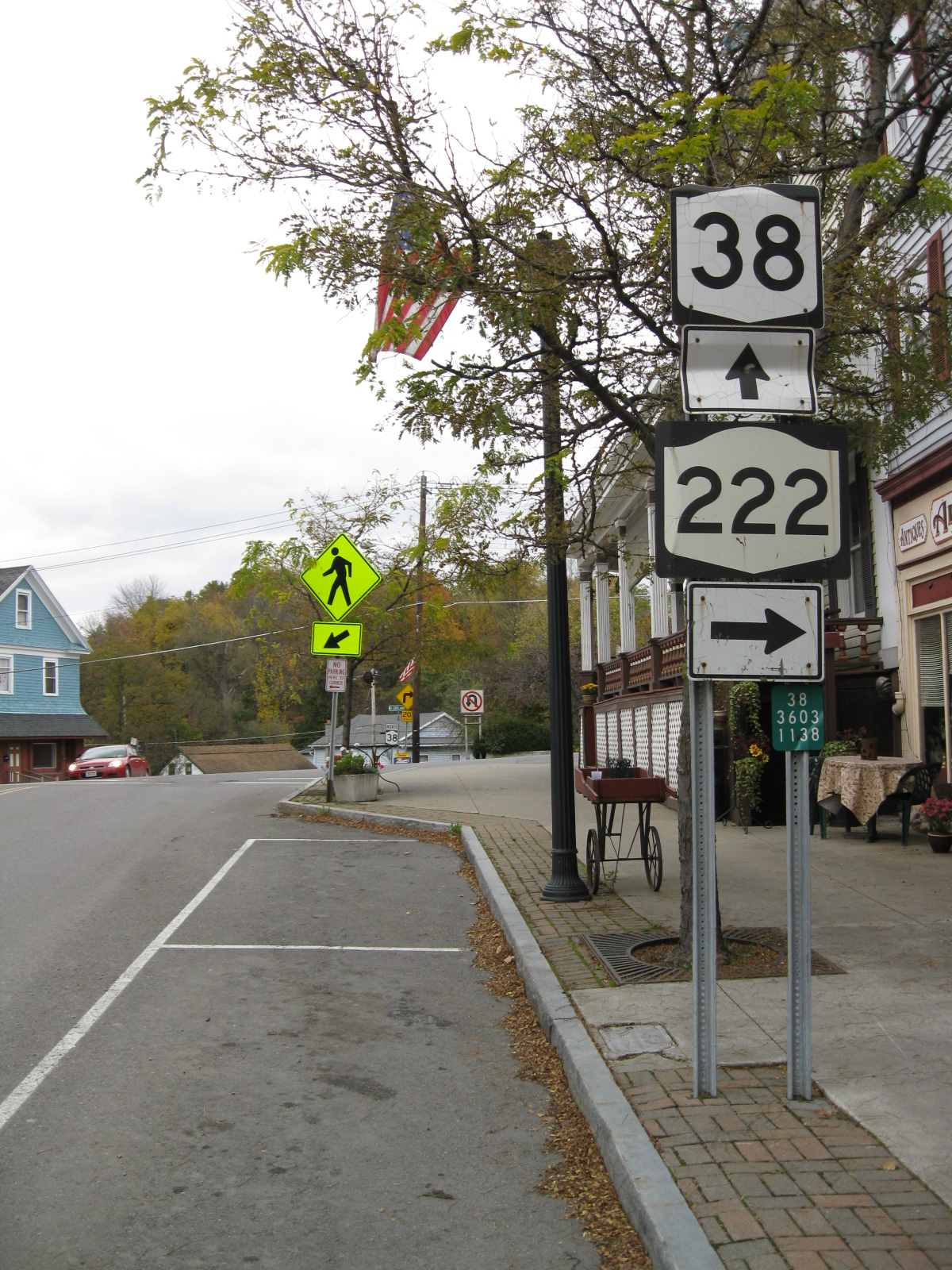
NY 38 at the intersection with NY 222 in Groton

NY 222 begins at an intersection with NY 38 (Main and Cayuga streets) in the village of Groton. The route proceeds east along the two-lane East Cortland Street, serving several blocks of homes in the eastern part of the village. As it exits the village limits and the residential areas, NY 222 (formerly known as Cortland Road) give way to wide stretches of farmland. As the highway runs across the town of Groton, it passes only a handful of houses as it intersects County Route 102 (CR 102, named Salt Road) and CR 103A (Champlin Road) at junctions roughly 1.5 miles (2.4 km) apart. NY 222's eastward track continues to a nearby intersection with CR 180 (Lafayette Road), where the route crosses Fall Creek and darts northeastward to run along the base of a large hill.

The highway briefly parallels Fall Creek; however, it soon splits to the southeast at a junction with CR 103 (Groton City Road). From here, NY 222 continues on a generally southeasterly alignment along the base of a rural valley to the Tompkins–Cortland county line. Now in Cortlandville, the route curves eastward to match similar turns in the valley's course. The highway follows a winding course until the surrounding gully empties into the much wider Tioughnioga River valley, where the route straightens out and intersects with CR 119 (Sears Road). East of this point, NY 222 begins to run northeastward past homes as it approaches Cortland County–Chase Field Airport. The route provides direct access to the airport and subsequently meets NY 281 (West Road) at the northeastern tip of the airport property.

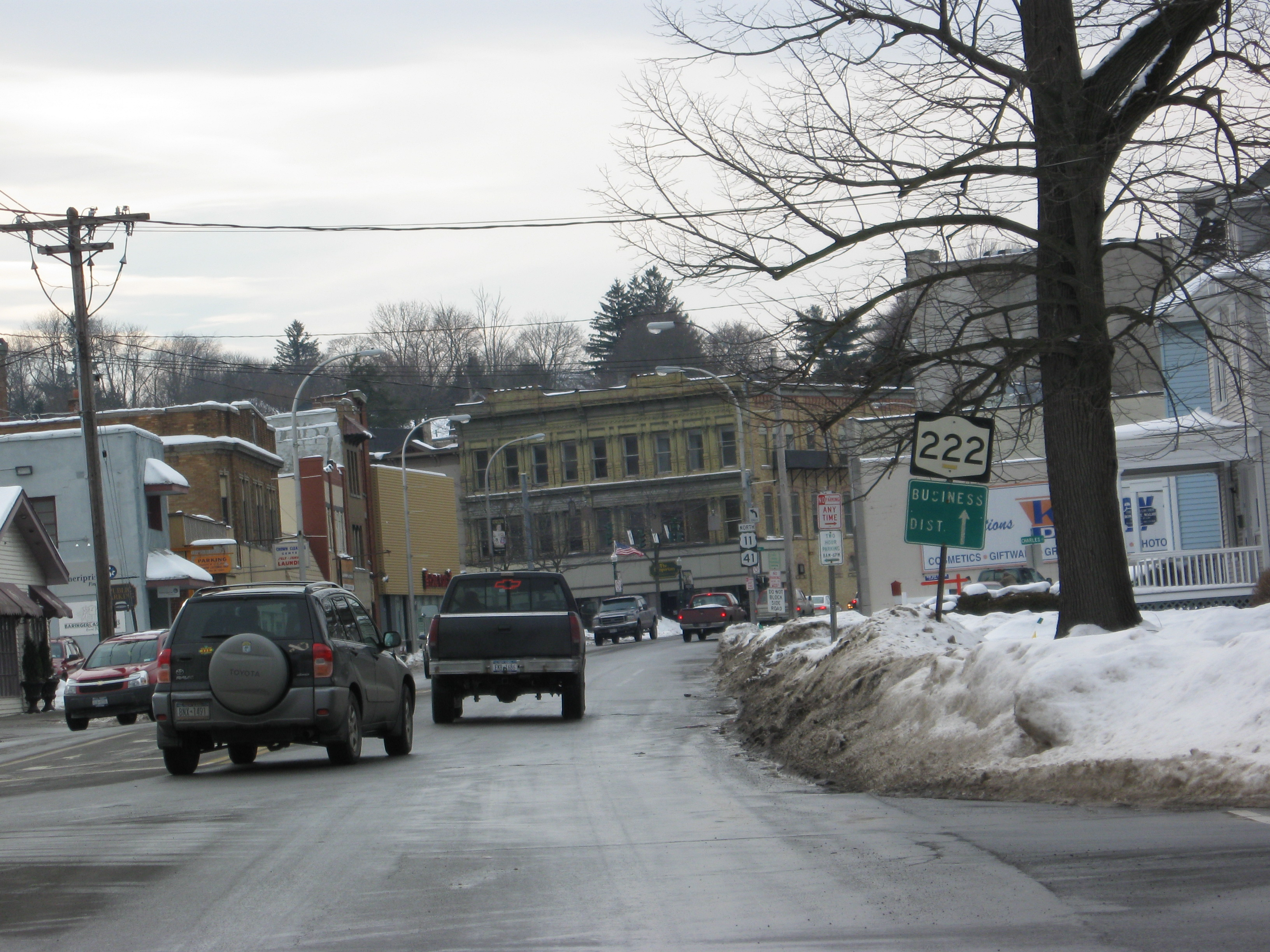
Eastbound on NY 222 in Cortland

Past NY 281, NY 222 crosses a commercial section of Cortlandville, passing several strip malls prior to entering the city of Cortland. Now named Groton Avenue, the route slowly curves eastward while traversing a residential part of the city. It passes north of the State University of New York at Cortland, and the campus marks the western edge of downtown Cortland. NY 222 becomes a commercialized street again, serving a pair of city blocks before intersecting with US 11 and NY 41 (Main Street). US 11 and NY 41 join NY 222, and the concurrency between the three routes heads east through downtown as Clinton Avenue. The overlap lasts for just one block, however, as NY 222 ends upon intersecting NY 13 at the next junction. NY 13 northbound continues east along Clinton Avenue while NY 13 southbound heads south along Church Street on an overlap with US 11 and NY 41.

== History ==
The east–west highway connecting the village of Groton to the city of Cortland was originally improved to state highway standards as part of three separate projects in the early 20th century. On July 10, 1906, the first project was let to rebuild the section between the Cortland city line and Highland Road, a north–south road west of what is now Cortland County–Chase Field Airport. The road was added to the state highway system on October 11, 1907 as unsigned State Highway 446 (SH 446). A contract to improve the part of the Groton–Cortland road leading west from Highland Road to the Tompkins County line was awarded on April 29, 1912, which was accepted into the state highway system on January 8, 1913, as SH 996.

In Tompkins County, the road was reconstructed as part of a project contracted out on August 24, 1916. Work on the highway was completed in the early-to-mid-1920s, and the improved road was added to the state highway system as SH 1433. The Groton–Cortland state highway did not have a posted route number until the 1930 renumbering of state highways in New York, when hundreds of state-maintained highways were assigned a designation for the first time. SH 446, SH 996, and SH 1433 were collectively designated as NY 222, which continued east into downtown Cortland by way of locally maintained streets. The alignment of NY 222 has not been changed since that time.

== Major intersections ==
County	Location	mi	km	Destinations	Notes
Tompkins	Village of Groton	0.00	0.00	NY 38 (Main Street / Cayuga Street) – Freeville, Locke	Western terminus
Cortland	Cortlandville	9.17	14.76	NY 281 (West Road)	
Cortland	Cortland	10.43	16.79	US 11 north / NY 41 north (Main Street)	Western terminus of US 11 / NY 41 / NY 222 overlap
Cortland	Cortland	10.57	17.01	US 11 south / NY 13 / NY 41 south (Clinton Avenue)	Eastern terminus, eastern terminus of US 11 / NY 41 / NY 222 overlap
1.000 mi = 1.609 km; 1.000 km = 0.621 mi: Concurrency terminus
