= Willet, New York =

- Town
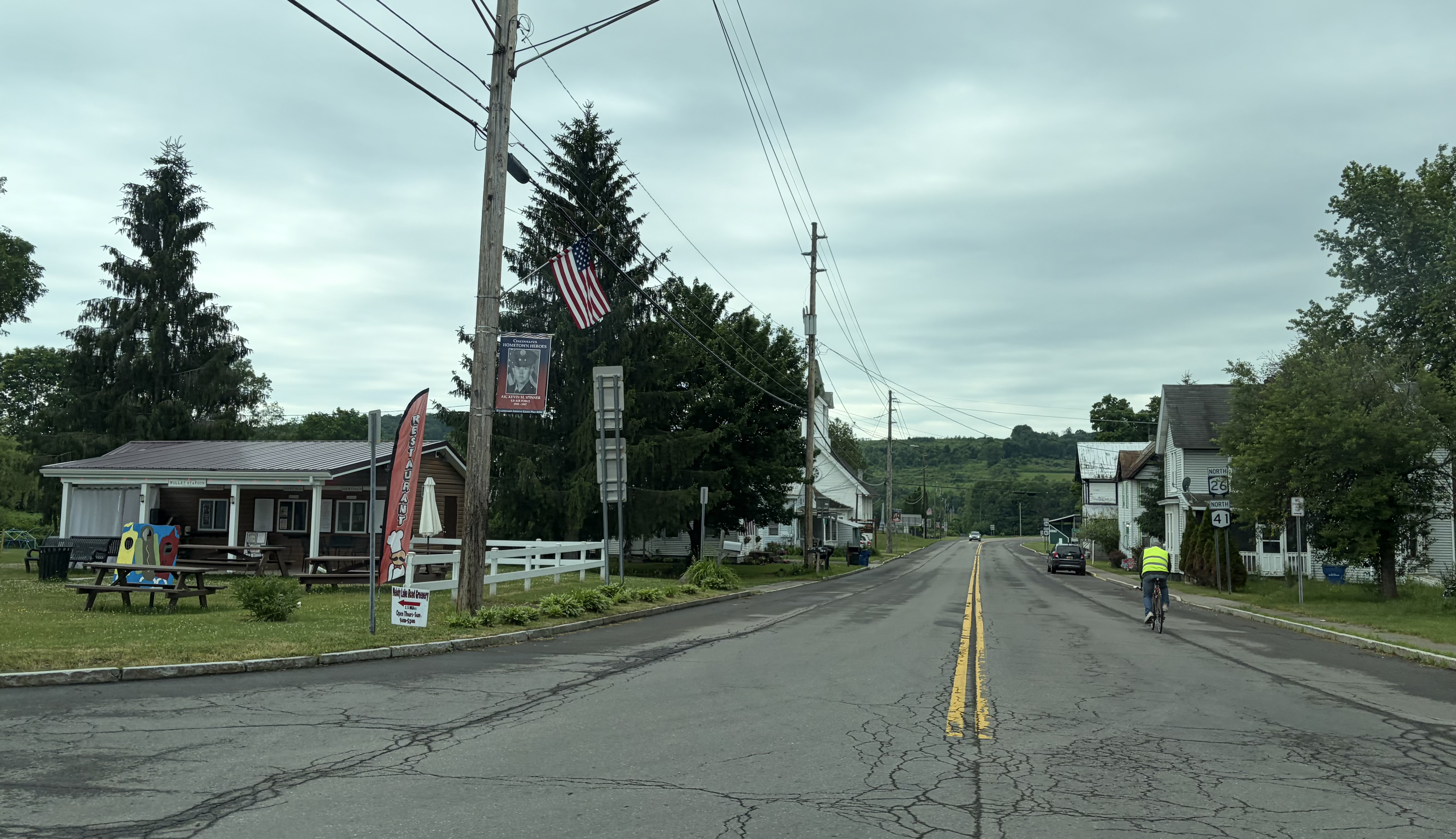
- The concurrency of Route 26 and Route 41 in Willet

- Location within Cortland County and New York

- Location in the United States Willet (New York)
- Coordinates: 42°27′5″N 75°55′11″W
- Country: United States
- State: New York
- County: Cortland

Government
  - Type: Town Council
  - Town Supervisor: Alvin W. Doty, Jr. (D, R)
  - Town Council: Members' List: • Richard A. Fowlston (D); • Charles D. Sudbrink (D); • Joanne Brown (R)

Area
  - Total: 26.05 sq mi (67.48 km^{2})
  - Land: 25.73 sq mi (66.65 km^{2})
  - Water: 0.32 sq mi (0.83 km^{2})
- Elevation: 1,004 ft (306 m)

Population (2010)
  - Total: 1,043
  - Estimate (2016): 997
  - Density: 38.7/sq mi (14.96/km^{2})
- Time zone: UTC-5 (Eastern (EST))
  - Summer (DST): UTC-4 (EDT)
- ZIP Codes: 13863 (Willet); 13862 (Whitney Point); 13841 (Smithville Flats); 13040 (Cincinnatus); 13803 (Marathon)
- Area code: 607
- FIPS code: 36-023-81963
- GNIS feature ID: 0979639

Willet is a town in Cortland County, New York, United States. The population was 1,043 at the 2010 census. The town is named after Colonel Marinus Willet. It is in the southeastern corner of the county, southeast of the City of Cortland.

== History ==
Willet was within the former Central New York Military Tract. The area was first settled circa 1797.

Willet was created from a part of the town of Cincinnatus in 1818. In 1865, the population was 982.

== Geography ==
According to the United States Census Bureau, the town has a total area of 26.1 square miles (67.5 km^{2}), of which 25.7 square miles (66.6 km^{2}) is land and 0.31 square miles (0.8 km^{2}), or 1.23%, is water.

The Otselic River flows southward through the town.

Willet is located in Cortland county

The eastern town line is the border of Chenango County, and the southern town boundary is the border of Broome County.

New York State Route 26 intersects New York State Route 41 at Willet village. New York State Route 221 intersects the conjoined NY-26 and NY-41 west of the village.

== Demographics ==
Historical population
Census	Pop.	Note	%±
1820	437		—
1830	840		92.2%
1840	921		9.6%
1850	925		0.4%
1860	983		6.3%
1870	889		−9.6%
1880	853		−4.0%
1890	800		−6.2%
1900	687		−14.1%
1910	643		−6.4%
1920	592		−7.9%
1930	512		−13.5%
1940	571		11.5%
1950	553		−3.2%
1960	535		−3.3%
1970	621		16.1%
1980	747		20.3%
1990	892		19.4%
2000	1,011		13.3%
2010	1,043		3.2%
2016 (est.)	997		−4.4%
U.S. Decennial Census

As of the census of 2000, there were 1,011 people, 368 households, and 281 families residing in the town. The population density was 39.1 inhabitants per square mile (15.1/km^{2}). There were 525 housing units at an average density of 20.3 per square mile (7.8/km^{2}). The racial makeup of the town was 98.42% White, 0.20% Native American, 0.10% Asian, and 1.29% from two or more races.

There were 368 households, out of which 37.5% had children under the age of 18 living with them, 60.6% were married couples living together, 10.9% had a female householder with no husband present, and 23.4% were non-families. 18.2% of all households were made up of individuals, and 6.8% had someone living alone who was 65 years of age or older. The average household size was 2.75 and the average family size was 3.06.

In the town, the population was spread out, with 29.4% under the age of 18, 7.0% from 18 to 24, 29.7% from 25 to 44, 23.3% from 45 to 64, and 10.6% who were 65 years of age or older. The median age was 35 years. For every 100 females, there were 105.5 males. For every 100 females age 18 and over, there were 104.0 males.

The median income for a household in the town was $35,893, and the median income for a family was $37,500. Males had a median income of $28,274 versus $21,932 for females. The per capita income for the town was $15,552. About 9.2% of families and 12.9% of the population were below the poverty line, including 17.1% of those under age 18 and 9.8% of those age 65 or over.

== Communities and locations in Willet ==
- Burlingame's Mills – A former location in the town east of Willet village.
- Georgetown – A hamlet east of Willet village on NY-41.
- Lakeview – A hamlet at the eastern town line on NY-41.
- Landers Corners – A location in the southwestern part of the town on NY-26.
- Penelope – A hamlet at the southern town line.
- Stump Pond – A small lake south of Georgetown.
- Willet – A hamlet in the northern part of the town at the junction of NY-26 and NY-41.
