= Cortlandville, New York =

- Town
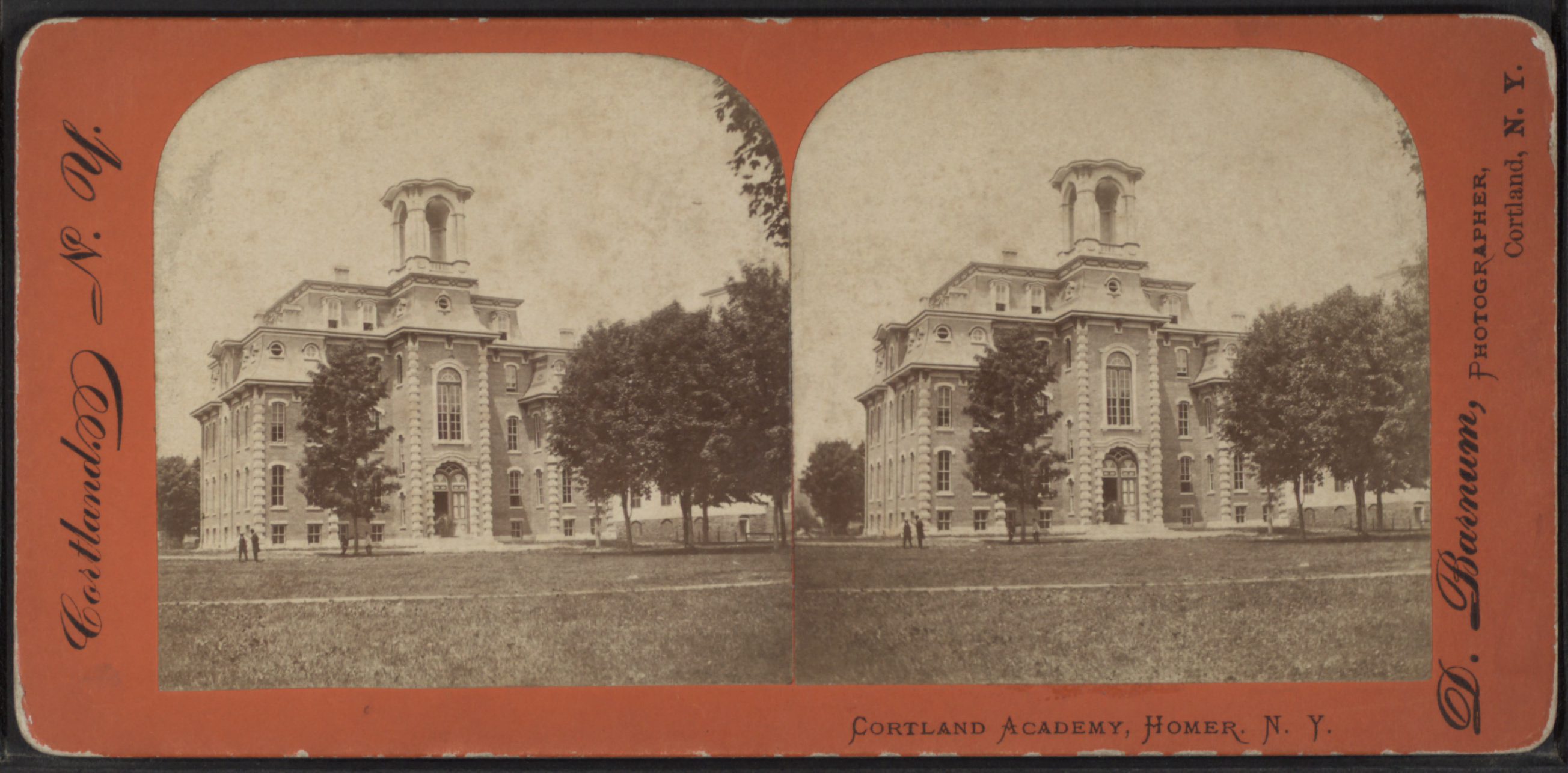
- The Cortland Academy, Homer, NY

- Location within New York Location within the United States
- Coordinates: 42°35′8″N 76°10′28″W
- Country: United States
- State: New York
- County: Cortland

Government
  - Type: Town Council
  - Town Supervisor: Greg Leach (R)
  - Town Council: Members' List: • Ron Rocco (R); • Theodore V. Testa (R); • John C. Proud (R); • Gregory K. Leach (R)

Area
  - Total: 49.90 sq mi (129.24 km^{2})
  - Land: 49.72 sq mi (128.78 km^{2})
  - Water: 0.18 sq mi (0.46 km^{2})
- Elevation: 1,099 ft (335 m)

Population (2020)
  - Total: 8,409
  - Density: 165.9/sq mi (64.05/km^{2})
- Time zone: UTC-5 (Eastern (EST))
  - Summer (DST): UTC-4 (EDT)
- ZIP Codes: 13045 (Cortland); 13101 (McGraw); 13738 (Blodgett Mills); 13077 (Homer)
- Area code: 607
- FIPS code: 36-023-18421
- GNIS feature ID: 0978872
- Website: www.cortlandville.gov

Cortlandville is a town in Cortland County, New York, United States. The population was 8,509 at the 2010 census.

Cortlandville surrounds the city of Cortland and is at the western border of the county.

== History ==
The town is in the former Central New York Military Tract.

The area was first settled in 1792 at Lorings Corners. In 1829, the town was taken from the south part of the town of Homer. The town was increased by additional land from the town of Virgil in 1845.

In 1853, the village of Cortland (the present city of Cortland) was incorporated as a village, and was reincorporated in 1864.

New York authorized a normal school (now State University of New York at Cortland) to be erected in the region in 1866.

== Geography ==
According to the United States Census Bureau, Cortlandville has a total area of 49.9 square miles (129.2 km^{2}), of which 49.7 square miles (128.8 km^{2}) is land and 0.19 square miles (0.5 km^{2}), or 0.36%, is water.

The Tioughnioga River flows southward through the town and is part of the Susquehanna River watershed. The western town line is the border of Tompkins County.

Interstate 81, U.S. Route 11, and New York State Route 281 are north-south highways. New York State Route 41 and New York State Route 222 are east-west highways, but NY-41 turns northward from Cortland. New York State Route 13 is a northeast-southwest highway.

== Demographics ==
Historical population
Census	Pop.	Note	%±
1830	3,573		—
1840	3,799		6.3%
1850	4,203		10.6%
1860	4,817		14.6%
1870	6,082		26.3%
1880	7,114		17.0%
1890	2,861		−59.8%
1900	2,907		1.6%
1910	3,155		8.5%
1920	3,237		2.6%
1930	3,520		8.7%
1940	3,823		8.6%
1950	4,058		6.1%
1960	5,660		39.5%
1970	7,469		32.0%
1980	8,299		11.1%
1990	8,054		−3.0%
2000	7,919		−1.7%
2010	8,509		7.5%
2020	8,409		−1.2%
U.S. Decennial Census

As of the census of 2000, there were 7,919 people, 3,166 households, and 2,168 families residing in the town. The population density was 159.0 inhabitants per square mile (61.4/km^{2}). There were 3,431 housing units at an average density of 68.9 per square mile (26.6/km^{2}). The racial makeup of the town was 96.93% White, 0.40% African American, 0.32% Native American, 0.71% Asian, 0.21% from other races, and 1.43% from two or more races. Hispanic or Latino of any race were 1.06% of the population.

There were 3,166 households, out of which 29.5% had children under the age of 18 living with them, 55.0% were married couples living together, 9.8% had a female householder with no husband present, and 31.5% were non-families. 23.0% of all households were made up of individuals, and 10.2% had someone living alone who was 65 years of age or older. The average household size was 2.49 and the average family size was 2.89.

In the town, the population was spread out, with 23.2% under the age of 18, 9.7% from 18 to 24, 25.8% from 25 to 44, 26.3% from 45 to 64, and 15.0% who were 65 years of age or older. The median age was 39 years. For every 100 females, there were 92.3 males. For every 100 females age 18 and over, there were 89.2 males.

The median income for a household in the town was $37,458, and the median income for a family was $46,888. Males had a median income of $31,530 versus $23,984 for females. The per capita income for the town was $19,887. About 8.2% of families and 12.6% of the population were below the poverty line, including 11.3% of those under age 18 and 6.9% of those age 65 or over.

== Communities and locations in the Town of Cortlandville ==
- Blodgett Mills – a hamlet and census-designated place in the southeast corner of the town on US-11
- Camp Tioughnioga – a location northwest of Cortland
- Cortland – the city of Cortland is separate from but surrounded by Cortlandville
- Cortland County Airport, Chase Field (N03) – an airport west of the city that serves the city and the local area. It is west of the intersection of NY-222 and NY-281
- Cortland West – a census-designated place on the western side of the town
- Gracie – a hamlet in the southwestern corner of the town
- Homer – the village of Homer is primarily to the north in the town of Homer, on US-11, but a small portion extends south into Cortlandville
- Loring Crossing – a hamlet near the northern town line and northeast of Cortland
- McGraw – the village of McGraw is in the eastern part of town on NY-41
- Munsons Corners – a hamlet and census-designated place on the southwestern border of the city of Cortland, located on NY-13
- South Cortland – a hamlet southwest of Cortland on NY-13
