= Cuyler, New York =

- Town
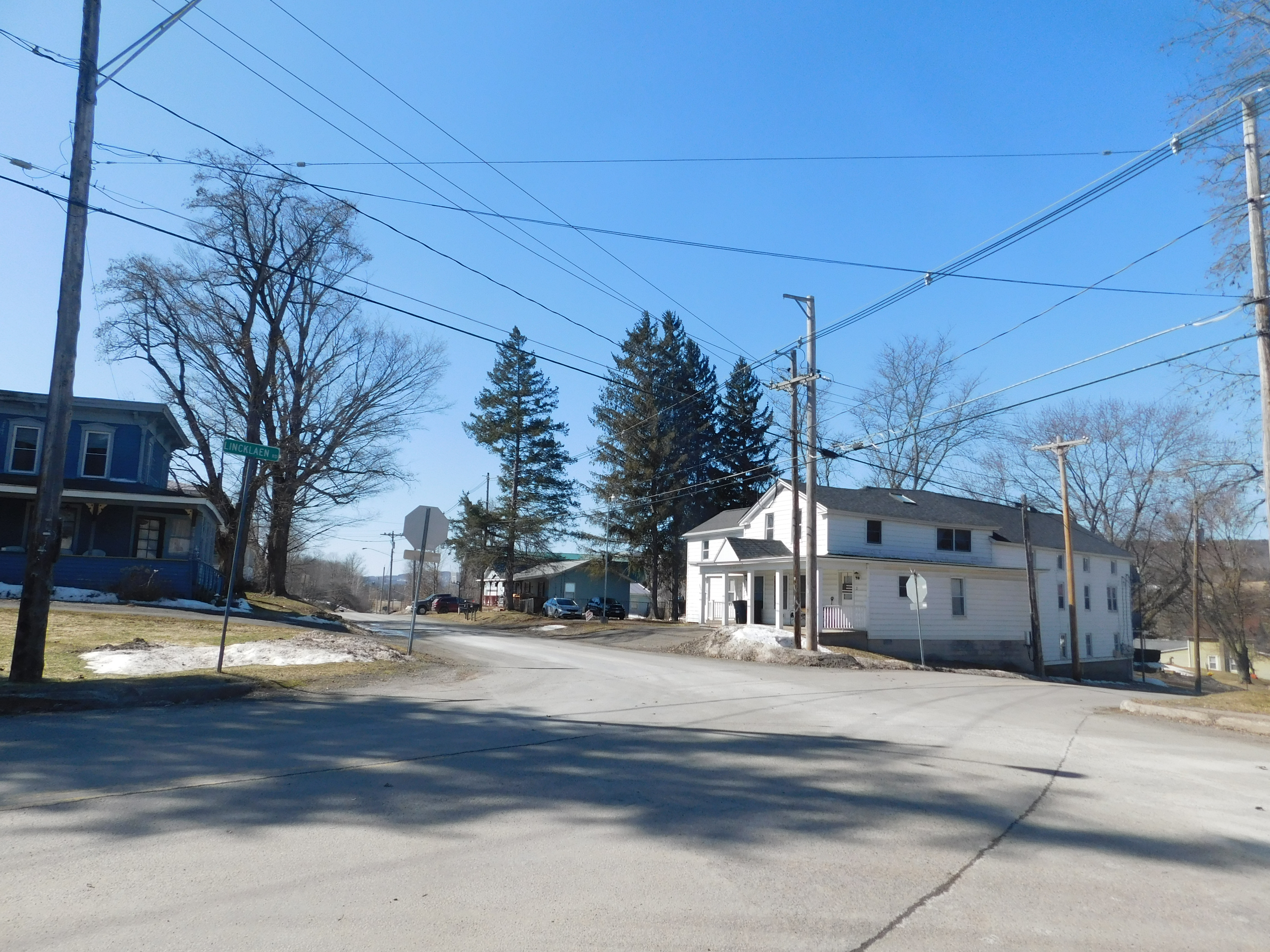
- The hamlet of Cuyler

- Location within Cortland County and New York

- Location in the United States Cuyler (New York)
- Coordinates: 42°43′29″N 75°56′19″W
- Country: United States
- State: New York
- County: Cortland

Government
  - Type: Town Council
  - Town Supervisor: Louanne Randall (R)
  - Town Council: Members' List: • Keith A. White (R); • Russell A. Smith (R); • Nancy L. Corbin (R); • Donald J. Beattie (D)

Area
  - Total: 43.51 sq mi (112.69 km^{2})
  - Land: 43.48 sq mi (112.61 km^{2})
  - Water: 0.031 sq mi (0.08 km^{2})
- Elevation: 1,670 ft (509 m)

Population (2020)
  - Total: 908
  - Density: 20.9/sq mi (8.06/km^{2})
- Time zone: UTC-5 (Eastern (EST))
  - Summer (DST): UTC-4 (EDT)
- ZIP Codes: 13158 (Cuyler); 13052 (De Ruyter); 13136 (Pitcher); 13040 (Cincinattus)
- Area code: 607
- FIPS code: 36-023-19499
- GNIS feature ID: 0978881
- Website: www.townofcuyler.org

Cuyler is a town in Cortland County, New York, United States. The population was 908 at the 2020 census.

The town is in the northeastern corner of Cortland County and is northeast of the city of Cortland.

== History ==
Cuyler was in the former Central New York Military Tract. The area was first settled circa 1794. The town was formed from part of the town of Truxton in 1858. In 1865, the population of the town was 1,447.

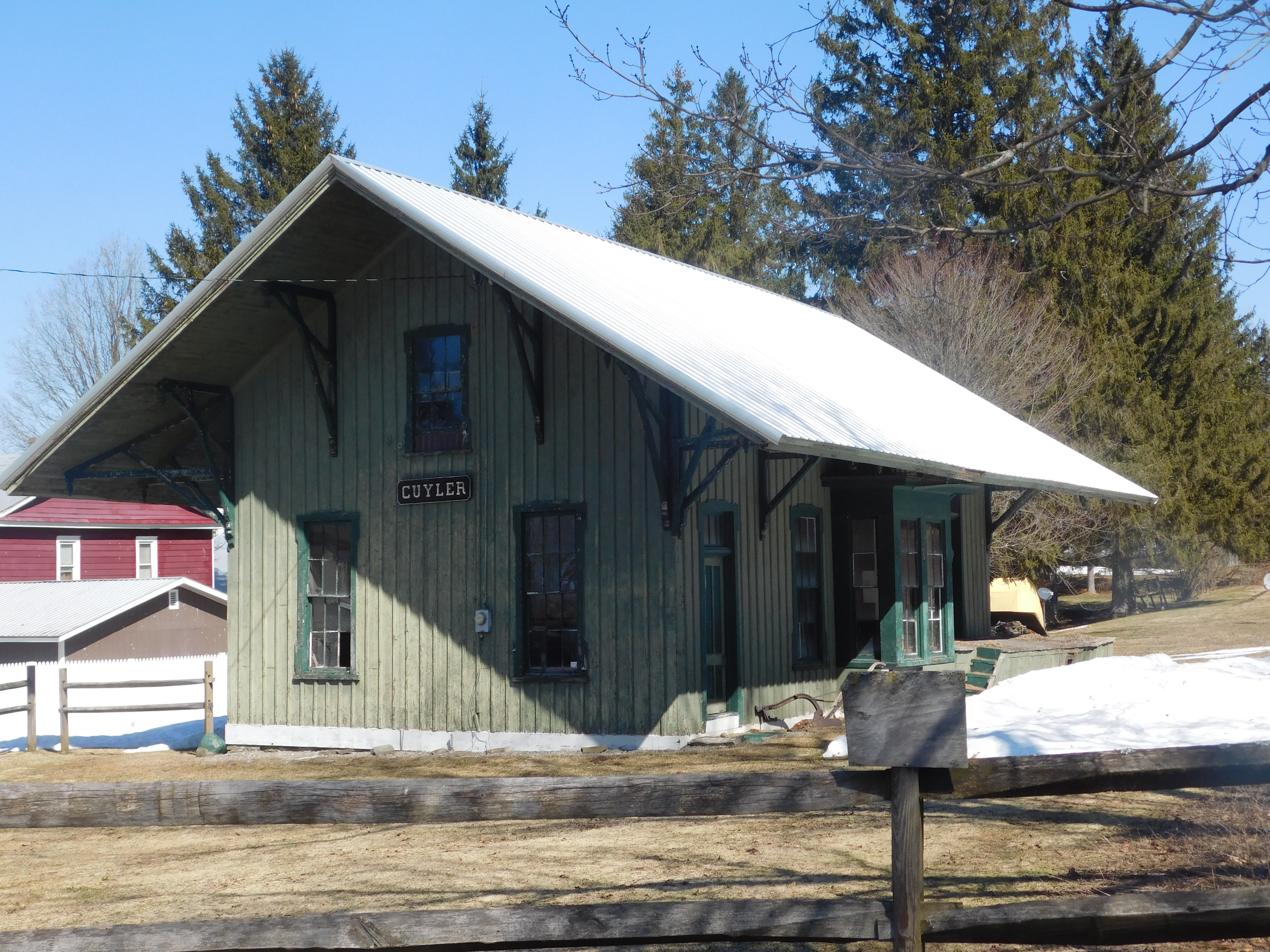
The former Lehigh Valley Railroad station in Cuyler

== Geography ==
According to the United States Census Bureau, the town has a total area of 43.5 square miles (112.7 km^{2}), of which 0.031 square miles (0.08 km^{2}), or 0.07%, is water.

The northern town line is the border of Onondaga County, and the eastern town boundary is the border of Madison and Chenango counties.

The East Branch of the Tioughnioga River flows southwest through the town. The entire town is within the watershed of the Susquehanna River.

New York State Route 13 is a northeast-southwest highway in Cuyler.

== Demographics ==
Historical population
Census	Pop.	Note	%±
1860	1,658		—
1870	1,357		−18.2%
1880	1,382		1.8%
1890	1,096		−20.7%
1900	991		−9.6%
1910	881		−11.1%
1920	813		−7.7%
1930	748		−8.0%
1940	708		−5.3%
1950	704		−0.6%
1960	753		7.0%
1970	836		11.0%
1980	846		1.2%
1990	850		0.5%
2000	1,036		21.9%
2010	980		−5.4%
2020	908		−7.3%

As of the census of 2020, there were 908 people, 306 households in the town. The population density was 23.8 inhabitants per square mile (9.2/km^{2}). There were 406 housing units at an average density of 9.3 per square mile (3.6/km^{2}). The racial makeup of the town was 92% White, 0.4% Native American, 2.0% from other races, and 5.4% from two or more races. Hispanic or Latino of any race were 3.3% of the population. There are zero Asians or African Americans living in Cuyler as of the 2020 census.

There were 306 households, of which 51.3% were married couples living together, 13.4% had a female householder with no spouse present, and 24.2% had a male householder with no spouse present. The average household size was 2.97.

In the town, the age distribution is 7.2% under the age of 5, 15.7% from 5 to 17, 58.9% from 18 to 64, and 18.2% who were 65 years of age or older.

The median income for a household in the town was $70,323. 15.9% of the population is below the poverty line, including 25.1% of those under age 18.

== Communities and locations in Cuyler ==
- Cowles Settlement – A hamlet in the northeastern part of the town by the town line.
- Cuyler – The hamlet of Cuyler on Route 13.
- Cuyler Hill – A hamlet southeast of Cuyler village.
- Keeney – A hamlet near the northern town line, north of Tripoli. The community was once known as "Keeney Settlement."
- New Boston – A hamlet in the southern part of the town.
- Tripoli – A hamlet northwest of Cuyler village.
