= New York State Route 41 =

State highway in central New York, US

New York State Route 41
- Map of central New York with NY 41 highlighted in red

Route information
- Maintained by NYSDOT and the city of Cortland
- Length: 95.63 mi (153.90 km)
- Existed: 1930–present

Major junctions
- South end: Future I-86 / NY 17 / CR 28 in Sanford
- I-88 in Afton; NY 12 in Greene; NY 26 in Willet; I-81 / US 11 in Cortland
- North end: US 20 in Skaneateles

Location
- Country: United States
- State: New York
- Counties: Broome, Chenango, Cortland, Onondaga

Highway system
- New York Highways; Interstate; US; State; Reference; Parkways
← NY 40	→ NY 41A

New York State Route 41 (NY 41) is a north–south state highway in Central New York in the United States. The southern terminus of the route is at an interchange with NY 17 (Future Interstate 86) in the town of Sanford in Broome County, New York. Its northern terminus is at an intersection with U.S. Route 20 (US 20) in the village of Skaneateles. The route is almost 100 miles (161 km) long and passes through Broome, Chenango, Cortland, and Onondaga counties. NY 41 was assigned as part of the 1930 renumbering of state highways in New York, replacing New York State Route 70 from Homer to Skaneateles. The route initially extended as far north as Jordan; however, NY 41 was cut back to its current northern terminus c. 1933.

== Route description ==
=== Sanford to Greene ===
NY 41 begins at NY 17 exit 82 in McClure, a hamlet within the town of Sanford. The route heads north, following Oquaga and Cornell Creeks through a series of valleys in the rural eastern portion of Broome County. It intersects only minor highways of local importance before crossing into Chenango County. Now in the town of Afton, NY 41 passes under Interstate 88 (I-88) just south of an intersection with County Route 26 (CR 26). The highway turns northeast, paralleling I-88 into the village of Afton.

In Afton village, NY 41 connects to I-88 by way of an eastward extension of Maple Avenue. NY 41 turns northwest at this junction, following Maple Avenue across the Susquehanna River and into the center of the village. Here, NY 41 briefly overlaps with NY 7 before exiting the village and heading northwestward through two more river valleys to the town of Coventry, where it meets NY 206 in the hamlet of Coventryville.

The two routes converge here and head west to the hamlet of Coventry, where they intersect the northern end of NY 235. NY 41 and NY 206 continue on, following Wheeler Brook westward into the town of Greene and the village of Greene located within. In the eastern portion of the village, the highway intersects CR 32, which joins the two state highways for two blocks before splitting off to the south at a junction on the eastern bank of the Chenango River. NY 41 and NY 206 continue west across the river into the village center, where the two routes meet NY 12. Here, NY 41 leaves NY 206 and follows NY 12 northward through the western portion of the village. The concurrency lasts for just 0.5 miles (0.8 km) before NY 41 splits from NY 12 and exits Greene village.

=== Greene to Cortland ===
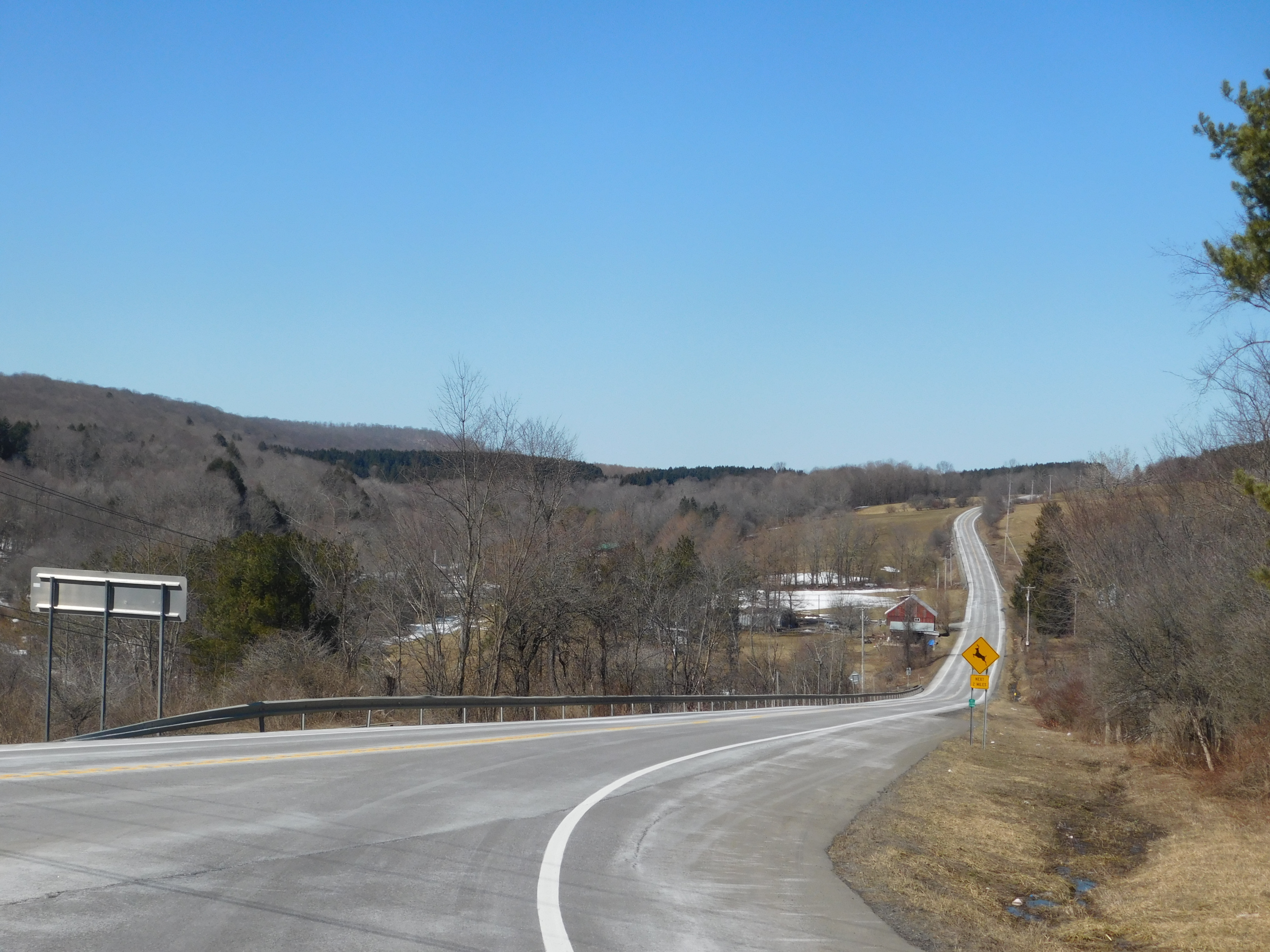
NY 41 in Willets, north of NY 26

The route continues north through the towns of Greene and Smithville to the hamlet of Smithville Flats, where it meets the western terminus of NY 220. NY 41 heads northwest from this junction, passing by Long Pond and Cincinnatus Lake before crossing into Cortland County and the town of Willet. In the hamlet of the same name, NY 41 intersects NY 26. It joins NY 41 here, and the two routes proceed northwest from the hamlet and across the Otselic River to a junction with the east end of NY 221. Past this point, NY 26 and NY 41 head due north along the river's west bank into the town of Cincinnatus.

The overlap comes to an end near the hamlet of Gee Brook, where NY 41 splits from NY 26 and veers northwestward into a rural valley surrounding a small stream that gives the hamlet of Gee Brook its name. NY 41 crosses through the northeastern corner of the town of Freetown and the southern portion of the town of Solon on its way to the town of Cortlandville, where it intersects I-81 and US 11 west of the village of McGraw. US 11 and NY 41 come together here and parallel I-81 westward toward the city of Cortland. Just east of the city line, I-81 veers north to avoid downtown Cortland while US 11 and NY 41 continue west across the Tioughnioga River and into the city.

US 11 and NY 41 follow Port Watson Street into downtown Cortland, where they meet NY 13 at Church Street. All three routes turn north here, following Church Street for three blocks to Clinton Avenue. Here, NY 13 turns east to follow Clinton Avenue while US 11 and NY 41 turns west onto Clinton Avenue, joining NY 222, which begins at the junction of Clinton Avenue and Church Street. Here, maintenance of the route shifts from the New York State Department of Transportation (NYSDOT) to the city of Cortland. The overlap between NY 41 and NY 222 ends two blocks later when US 11 and NY 41 turn north onto North Main Street. The two routes remain on North Main Street up to Homer Avenue, at which point the two routes veer onto Homer Avenue and follow it out of the city, at which point maintenance of NY 41 becomes the responsibility of NYSDOT once more.

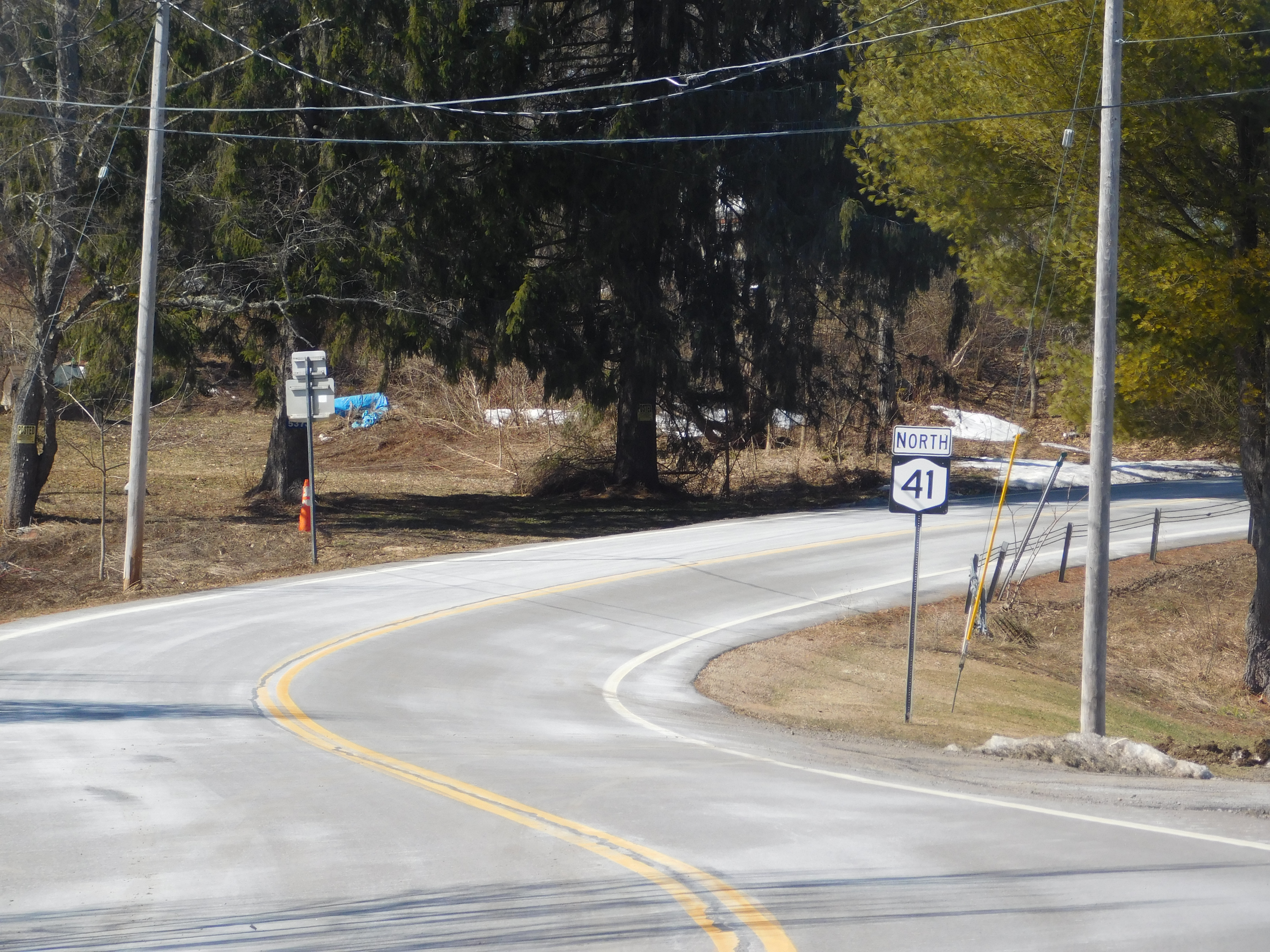
NY 41 in Smithville Flats

=== Cortland to Skaneateles ===
Now in the adjacent village of Homer, US 11 and NY 41 meet I-81 once more by way of a lengthy exit ramp internally designated as NY 930Q by NYSDOT. The two routes continue on through the Village of Homer, where they meet the southern terminus of NY 90. The overlap between US 11 and NY 41 ends three blocks later when NY 41 leaves US 11 and follows Clinton Street to the northwest. NY 41 intersects with NY 281 before leaving Homer village.

Just over 2 miles (3.2 km) northwest of the Homer village limits in the town of Homer, NY 41 intersects with NY 41A, its only suffixed route. While NY 41A heads off to the west, NY 41 heads north through the town of Scott and into the Onondaga County town of Spafford, where it becomes East Lake Road and begins to parallel Skaneateles Lake. NY 41 heads northwest through Spafford, running atop a long, narrow hill bounded by Skaneateles Lake to the west and Otisco Lake to the east. At Borodino, a hamlet in northern Spafford, NY 41 meets the southern terminus of NY 174. North of Borodino, NY 41 follows a more lakeside routing through the towns of Spafford and Skaneateles to the village of Skaneateles, where NY 41 ends at a junction with US 20.

== History ==
From the mid-1920s to 1930, the road connecting the village of Skaneateles to the village of Homer via the east side of Skaneateles Lake was designated as NY 70, a numbered state highway 26 miles (42 km) long. Further south, the road leading southeast from the city of Cortland, through Greene at the Chenango River, to Afton at the Susquehanna River (a distance of 54 miles or 87 kilometres) was an unnumbered road. In the 1930 state highway renumbering, the entire length of old NY 70 was incorporated into the newly established NY 41. This new route was, at the time, designated from McClure (beginning at an intersection with NY 17) through Afton and Greene to Cortland, where it met US 11. NY 41 overlapped US 11 through Cortland to Homer, from where NY 41 used old NY 70 to reach US 20 in Skaneateles. The new Route 41 continued further north to the village of Jordan (at NY 31). The portion of the Skaneateles–Jordan highway between Elbridge and Jordan was previously known as NY 31A prior to 1930. When initially created in 1930, NY 41 was 112 miles (180 km) long. A pair of state routes in the vicinity of Jordan were renumbered as spur routes of NY 31 c. 1933. One of these was the portion of NY 41 north of Elbridge, which became NY 31C. NY 41 was truncated on its northern end to Skaneateles as part of the change. The south end of NY 41 was shifted slightly with the opening of the Quickway c. 1960.

== NY 41A ==

NY 41A (25.49 miles or 41.02 kilometres) is a western alternate route of NY 41 which runs from Homer to Skaneateles along the west shore of Skaneateles Lake. It was assigned as part of the 1930 renumbering of state highways in New York.

== Major intersections ==
County	Location	mi	km	Destinations	Notes
Broome	Sanford	0.00	0.00	Future I-86 / NY 17 / CR 28 – New York, Binghamton	Southern terminus; exit 82 on NY 17; hamlet of McClure
Chenango	Village of Afton	14.51	23.35	I-88 – Albany, Binghamton	Exit 7 on I-88
Chenango	Village of Afton	14.93	24.03	NY 7 – Nineveh, Bainbridge	
Chenango	Coventry	22.70	36.53	NY 206 east – Bainbridge	South end of NY 206 overlap; hamlet of Coventryville
Chenango	Coventry	24.81	39.93	NY 235 south – Afton	Northern terminus of NY 235; hamlet of Coventry
Chenango	Village of Greene	32.30	51.98	NY 12 south / NY 206 west – Binghamton, Whitney Point	South end of NY 12 overlap; north end of NY 206 overlap
Chenango	Village of Greene	32.76	52.72	NY 12 north – Norwich	North end of NY 12 overlap
Chenango	Smithville	38.22	61.51	NY 220 east – McDonough	Western terminus of NY 220; hamlet of Smithville Flats
Cortland	Willet	46.60	75.00	NY 26 south – Whitney Point	South end of NY 26 overlap; hamlet of Willet
Cortland	Willet	47.18	75.93	NY 221 west – Marathon	Eastern terminus of NY 221
Cortland	Cincinnatus	50.43	81.16	NY 26 north – Cincinnatus	North end of NY 26 overlap
Cortland	Cortlandville	64.13– 64.38	103.21– 103.61	US 11 south / I-81 – Syracusecity2=Marathon	South end of US 11 overlap; exit 50 on I-81; hamlet of Pokeville
Cortland	Cortland	66.71	107.36	NY 13 south – Dryden, Ithaca	South end of NY 13 overlap
Cortland	Cortland	67.02	107.86	NY 13 north to I-81 NY 222 begins	North end of NY 13 overlap; eastern terminus of NY 222; eastern terminus of NY 41 / NY 222 overlap
Cortland	Cortland	67.25	108.23	NY 222 west	North end of NY 222 overlap
Cortland	Village of Homer	69.04	111.11	I-81 – Syracuse, Binghamton	Exit 54 on I-81
Cortland	Village of Homer	69.65	112.09	NY 90 north	Southern terminus of NY 90
Cortland	Village of Homer	69.94	112.56	US 11 north	North end of US 11 overlap
Cortland	Village of Homer	70.59	113.60	NY 281 to I-81	
Cortland	Town of Homer	73.04	117.55	NY 41A north	Southern terminus of NY 41A
Onondaga	Spafford	88.18	141.91	NY 174 north – Marcellus, Camillus	Southern terminus of NY 174; hamlet of Borodino
Onondaga	Village of Skaneateles	95.63	153.90	US 20 – Auburn, LaFayette, Cazenovia	Northern terminus
1.000 mi = 1.609 km; 1.000 km = 0.621 mi: Concurrency terminus
