= Marathon, New York =

- Town
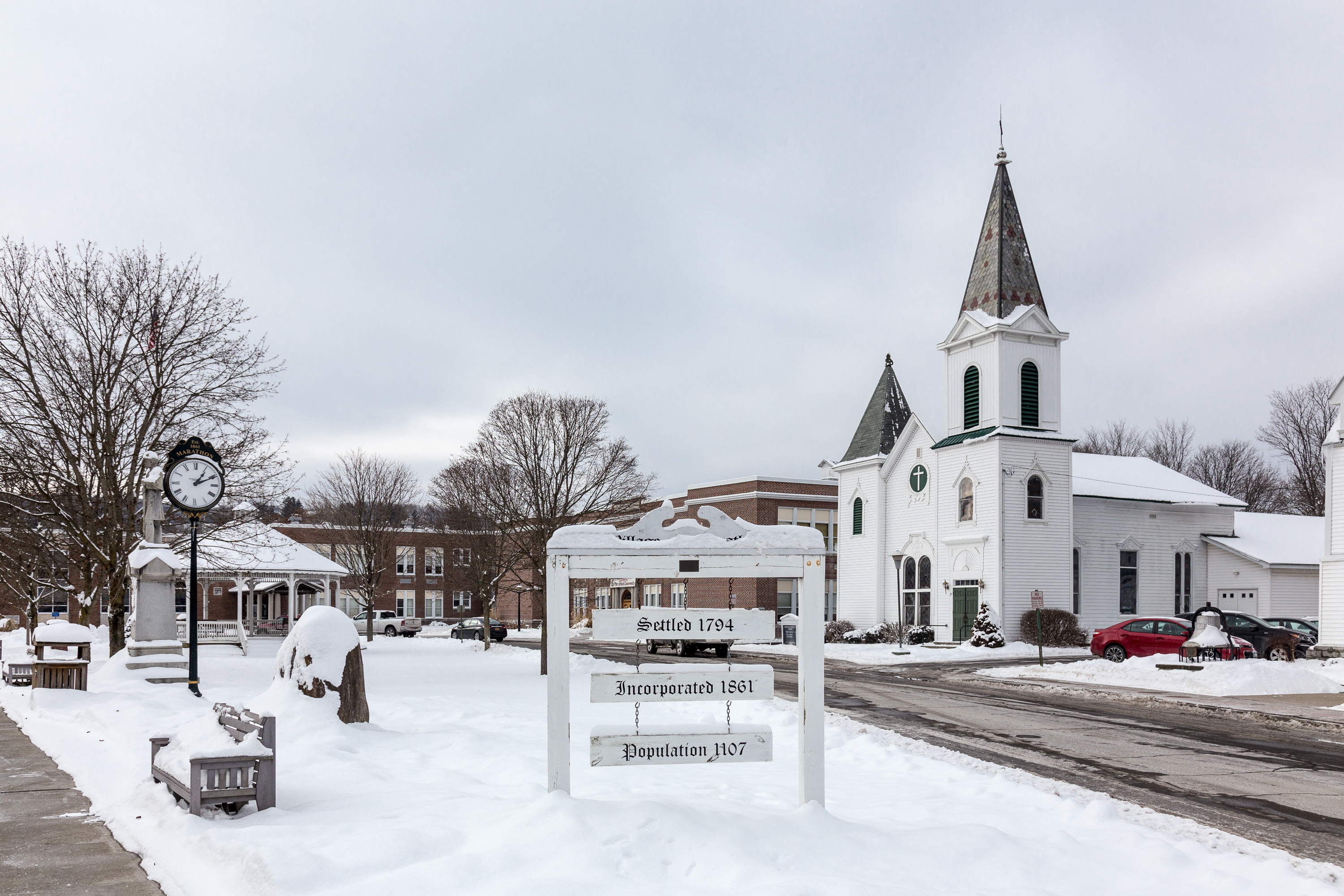
- Town center in winter

- Location within Cortland County and New York

- Location in the United States Marathon (New York)
- Coordinates: 42°26′54″N 076°00′43″W
- Country: United States
- State: New York
- County: Cortland

Government
  - Type: Town Council
  - Town Supervisor: Tim P. Elliott (R)
  - Town Council: Members' List: • Timothy P. Elliot (R); • Patricia A. Willis (R); • Thomas D. Adams (R); • Donald B. Hines (R)

Area
  - Total: 25.07 sq mi (64.93 km^{2})
  - Land: 24.94 sq mi (64.59 km^{2})
  - Water: 0.13 sq mi (0.34 km^{2})
- Elevation: 1,332 ft (406 m)

Population (2010)
  - Total: 1,967
  - Estimate (2016): 1,888
  - Density: 75.7/sq mi (29.23/km^{2})
- Time zone: UTC-5 (Eastern (EST))
  - Summer (DST): UTC-4 (EDT)
- ZIP Code: 13803
- FIPS code: 36-023-45403
- GNIS feature ID: 979194
- Website: www.townofmarathonny.gov

Marathon is a town in Cortland County, New York, United States. The population was 1,967 at the 2010 census.

The town of Marathon contains a village also named Marathon. The town is on the southern border of the county and is in the Southern tier region of New York State and is southeast of Cortland.

The Central New York Maple Festival takes place in Marathon annually.

== History ==
Marathon is within the bounds of the former Central New York Military Tract. The first settlers arrived in 1794.

The town was formed from part of the town of Cincinnatus as the "Town of Harrison" in 1818. The name was changed to "Marathon" in 1828 because another town in New York was named Harrison. The present name is after the Battle of Marathon. The Delaware, Lackawanna & Western Railroad's Syracuse Branch through Marathon opened on October 18, 1854.

The village of Marathon set itself off from the town in 1861 by incorporation.

== Notable people ==
- Francis G. Brink, United States Army Brigadier General, was born in Marathon.

== Geography ==
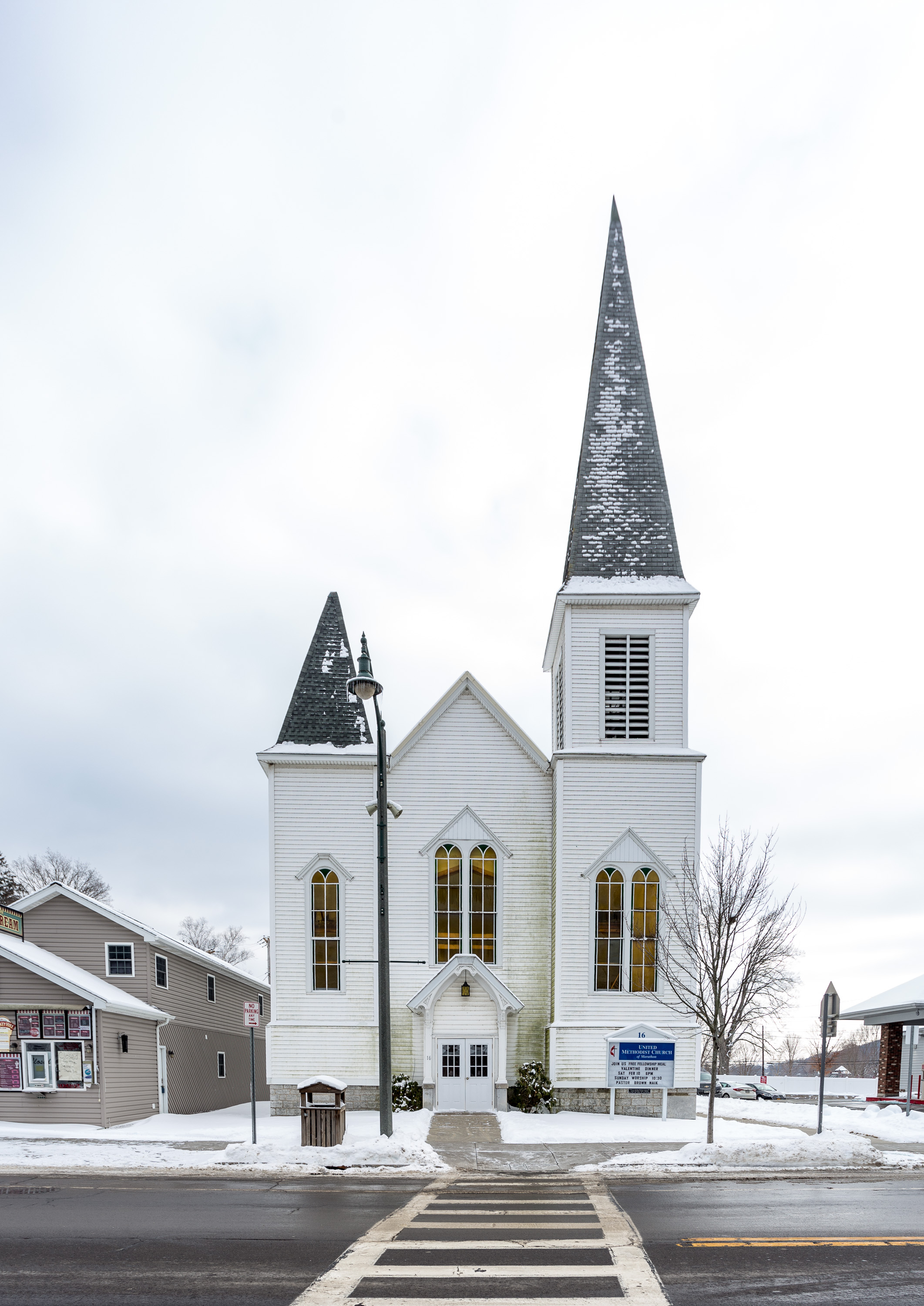
United Methodist Church of Marathon, New York

According to the United States Census Bureau, the town has a total area of 25.1 square miles (64.9 km^{2}), of which 25.0 square miles (64.7 km^{2}) is land and 0.12 square miles (0.3 km^{2}), or 0.53%, is water.

U.S. Route 11 and Interstate 81 are important north–south highways, and New York State Route 221, an east–west highway, intersects the former at Marathon village.

The Tioughnioga River, part of the Susquehanna River watershed, crosses the town along the same course as Interstate 81 and US-11.

The southern town line is the border of Broome County.

== Demographics ==
Historical population
Census	Pop.	Note	%±
1820	807		—
1830	895		10.9%
1840	1,080		20.7%
1850	1,341		24.2%
1860	1,502		12.0%
1870	1,611		7.3%
1880	1,700		5.5%
1890	1,806		6.2%
1900	1,664		−7.9%
1910	1,589		−4.5%
1920	1,296		−18.4%
1930	1,322		2.0%
1940	1,417		7.2%
1950	1,577		11.3%
1960	1,696		7.5%
1970	1,777		4.8%
1980	1,804		1.5%
1990	2,019		11.9%
2000	2,189		8.4%
2010	1,967		−10.1%
2016 (est.)	1,888	▼	−4.0%
U.S. Decennial Census

As of the census of 2000, there were 2,189 people, 814 households, and 598 families residing in the town. The population density was 87.7 inhabitants per square mile (33.9/km^{2}). There were 861 housing units at an average density of 34.5 units per square mile (13.3 units/km^{2}). The racial makeup of the town was 98.49% White, 0.73% Black or African American, 0.14% Native American, 0.09% from other races, and 0.55% from two or more races. Hispanic or Latino of any race were 0.55% of the population.

There were 814 households, out of which 39.9% had children under the age of 18 living with them, 57.4% were married couples living together, 10.7% had a female householder with no husband present, and 26.5% were non-families. 21.4% of all households were made up of individuals, and 9.7% had someone living alone who was 65 years of age or older. The average household size was 2.69 and the average family size was 3.10.

In the town, the population was spread out, with 30.7% under the age of 18, 6.0% from 18 to 24, 29.3% from 25 to 44, 21.5% from 45 to 64, and 12.5% who were 65 years of age or older. The median age was 36 years. For every 100 females, there were 94.9 males. For every 100 females age 18 and over, there were 90.8 males.

The median income for a household in the town was $34,274, and the median income for a family was $40,379. Males had a median income of $29,781 versus $22,125 for females. The per capita income for the town was $15,322. About 8.6% of families and 10.9% of the population were below the poverty line, including 12.3% of those under age 18 and 12.0% of those age 65 or over.

== Central New York Maple Festival ==
The town holds an annual festival celebrating New York maple, its production, and its producers, and includes vendors, exhibitions, and concerts.
