= Cincinnatus, New York =

- Town
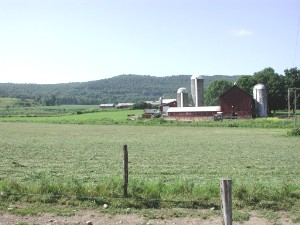
- Dairy Farm, Cincinnatus, NY

- Location within Cortland County and New York

- Location in the United States Cincinnatus (New York)
- Coordinates: 42°31′52″N 75°55′44″W
- Country: United States
- State: New York
- County: Cortland
- Named after: Cincinnatus

Government
  - Type: Town Council
  - Town Supervisor: Ronald R. Constantino (R)
  - Town Council: Members' List: • Jonathan A. McKee (R); • Nicholas Constantino (R); • Patrick Wiater (R); • Bob Hemming (R)

Area
  - Total: 25.48 sq mi (66.00 km^{2})
  - Land: 25.36 sq mi (65.67 km^{2})
  - Water: 0.13 sq mi (0.34 km^{2})
- Elevation: 1,106 ft (337 m)

Population (2020)
  - Total: 910 ▼
  - Estimate (2021): 902
  - Density: 39.9/sq mi (15.41/km^{2})
- Time zone: UTC-5 (Eastern (EST))
  - Summer (DST): UTC-4 (EDT)
- ZIP code: 13040
- Area code: 607
- FIPS code: 36-023-15748
- GNIS feature ID: 0978827
- Website: townofcincinnatus.org

Cincinnatus is a small town in Cortland County, New York, United States. The population was 910 at the 2020 census. The town is named after the Roman general Lucius Quinctius Cincinnatus. It is in the eastern part of the county and is east of the city of Cortland.

== History ==
The region was part of the Central New York Military Tract used to pay soldiers of the American Revolution. One of the townships was named Cincinnatus. Members of the Oneida tribe persisted in the town during its early history.

The town was first settled circa 1795. It was one of the original six towns of Cortland County. The town was formed from the town of Solon in 1804. In 1818, Cincinnatus was split so that part of its territory was used to create the towns of Freetown, Willet, and Marathon.

== Geography ==
According to the United States Census Bureau, the town has a total area of 25.5 square miles (66.0 km^{2}), of which 25.4 square miles (65.7 km^{2}) is land and 0.12 square miles (0.3 km^{2}), or 0.51%, is water.

The eastern town line is the border of Chenango County.

The Otselic River valley is central to the town; the river is part of the Susquehanna River watershed.

New York State Route 26 is a north–south highway in Cincinnatus, which conjoins New York State Route 41 near the town center. New York State Route 23 intersects NY-26 south of Cincinnatus village.

=== Communities and locations in Cincinnatus ===
- Cincinnatus – The hamlet of Cincinnatus is in the northeastern part of the town on NY-26 along the Otselic River.
- Gee Brook – A hamlet in the southern part of the town on NY Route 26.
- Lower Cincinnatus – A hamlet south of Cincinnatus village on NY-23.
- Taylor – A hamlet by the town line in the northeastern section of the town on NY-26.

== Demographics ==
Historical population
Census	Pop.	Note	%±
1820	885		—
1830	1,308		47.8%
1840	1,301		−0.5%
1850	1,206		−7.3%
1860	1,213		0.6%
1870	1,155		−4.8%
1880	1,093		−5.4%
1890	956		−12.5%
1900	912		−4.6%
1910	965		5.8%
1920	941		−2.5%
1930	901		−4.3%
1940	957		6.2%
1950	977		2.1%
1960	960		−1.7%
1970	1,080		12.5%
1980	1,151		6.6%
1990	1,122		−2.5%
2000	1,051		−6.3%
2010	1,056		0.5%
2020	910		−13.8%
2021 (est.)	902		−0.9%
U.S. Decennial Census

As of the census of 2000, there were 1,051 people, 418 households, and 282 families residing in the town. The population density was 41.3 inhabitants per square mile (15.9/km^{2}). There were 453 housing units at an average density of 17.8 per square mile (6.9/km^{2}). The racial makeup of the town was 98.00% White, 0.19% African American, 0.19% Native American, 0.29% from other races, and 1.33% from two or more races. Hispanic or Latino of any race were 2.09% of the population.

There were 418 households, out of which 29.4% had children under the age of 18 living with them, 56.2% were married couples living together, 8.9% had a female householder with no husband present, and 32.3% were non-families. 26.1% of all households were made up of individuals, and 14.6% had someone living alone who was 65 years of age or older. The average household size was 2.46 and the average family size was 2.98.

In the town, the population was spread out, with 25.2% under the age of 18, 6.4% from 18 to 24, 27.2% from 25 to 44, 26.8% from 45 to 64, and 14.4% who were 65 years of age or older. The median age was 40 years. For every 100 females, there were 90.7 males. For every 100 females age 18 and over, there were 95.0 males.

The median income for a household in the town was $37,014, and the median income for a family was $44,375. Males had a median income of $27,222 versus $21,304 for females. The per capita income for the town was $18,345. About 4.5% of families and 7.3% of the population were below the poverty line, including 6.3% of those under age 18 and 7.8% of those age 65 or over.

== Arts and culture ==
The Cincinnatus Historic District, consisting of 14 properties, was listed on the National Register of Historic Places in 1984.

== Notable people ==
- Charles G. Crosse, physician and legislator
- Adelaide Hawley Cumming, vaudeville performer and living trademark for General Mills
- Jeremiah W. Dwight, former US congressman
- Amos E. Germer, lawyer and legislator
- Vera Gushee, astronomer, professor at Smith College
- Elmer Ambrose Sperry, inventor
- John Sterling Kingsley, professor of biology and zoology
- Spiegle Willcox, jazz trombonist
