= Central New York Military Tract =

Land given to soldiers in the 1700s

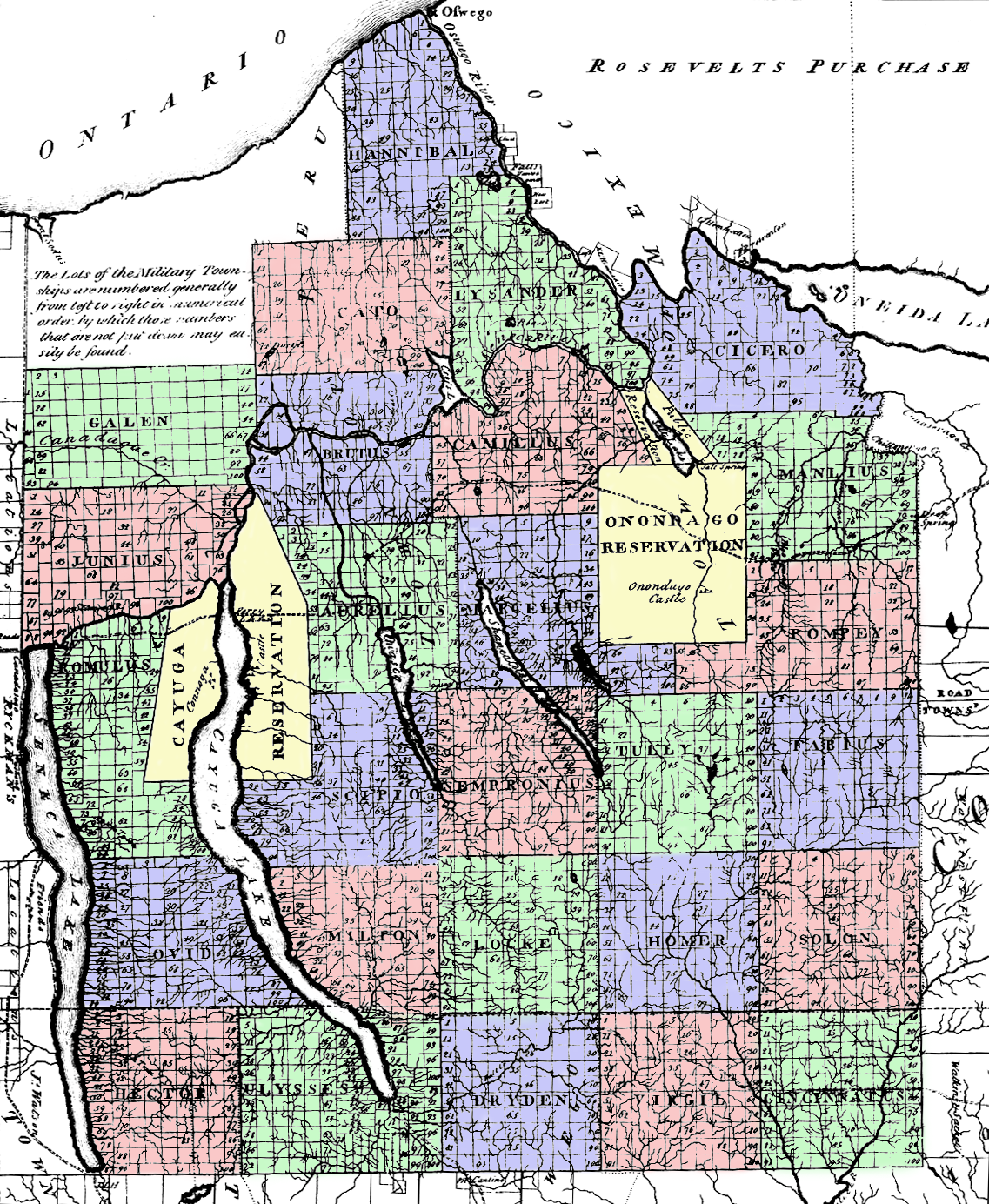
Central New York's Military Tract townships. Map from the original by Simeon De Witt

The Military Tract of Central New York, also called the New Military Tract, consisted of nearly two million acres (8,100 km^{2}) of bounty land set aside in Central New York to compensate New York's soldiers after their participation in the Revolutionary War. The western portion was established on lands that had been devasted by the Sullivan Expedition against the four British-allied nations of the Iroquois.

== Establishment ==
The Province of New York (predecessor of the U.S. state) had already guaranteed each soldier at least 100 acres (0.4 km^{2}) at the end of the war (depending on rank), but by 1781, New York had enlisted only about half of the quota set by the U.S. Congress and needed a stronger incentive. The legislature authorized an additional 500 acres (2 km^{2}) per soldier, using land from 25 Military Tract Townships to be established in central New York State. Each of the townships was to comprise 100 lots of 600 acres (2.4 km^{2}) each. Three more such townships, Junius, Galen, and Sterling, were later added to accommodate additional claims at the end of the war. The United States Congress approved in 1789, and the arrangement became final in 1798.

== Townships ==
The townships were at first numbered (1 through 28), but were later given (mostly) classical tradition Greek and Roman names, along with the Carthaginian general Hannibal, and a few honoring English authors:

1. Lysander
2. Hannibal
3. Cato
4. Brutus
5. Camillus
6. Cicero
7. Manlius
8. Aurelius
9. Marcellus
10. Pompey
11. Romulus
12. Scipio
13. Sempronius
14. Tully
15. Fabius
16. Ovid
17. Milton
18. Locke
19. Homer
20. Solon
21. Hector
22. Ulysses
23. Dryden
24. Virgil
25. Cincinnatus
26. Junius
27. Galen
28. Sterling

== Overview ==
The tract covered the present counties of Cayuga, Cortland, Onondaga, and Seneca, and parts of Oswego, Tompkins, Schuyler and Wayne. Most of these township names are reflected in current town names in these counties, but the area of the military townships do not correspond exactly with any of the modern towns, which only cover a fraction of the original townships.

The names themselves have been attributed to Robert Harpur, who served in various political roles, and was at the time a clerk in the office of New York's Surveyor General, Simeon De Witt.

Townships were 60,000 acres. One hundred lots, containing 600 acres per lot, were laid out in each township. Ninety-four lots in each Township were to be conveyed by land patents, with the other six reserved for public purposes such as churches and schools.

The portion of the Military Tract north of Seneca Lake (i.e. townships of Galen and Junius) was divided by the New Preemption Line from land to its west assigned by the Treaty of Hartford of 1786 to Massachusetts. The tract immediately to the west became the Phelps and Gorham Purchase. The west limit of most of the tract was Seneca Lake.

Two Indian reservations were included in the Tract, for the Onondaga and Cayuga. All of the Cayuga and most of the Onondaga (including the City of Syracuse) were taken a few years later by New York State by treaties whose legality has been repeatedly challenged, since following the Trade and Intercourse Act of 1790 only the United States could conclude treaties with Indians.

== Timeline ==
- June 18, 1779: The Sullivan Campaign begins. On George Washington's orders, they commit acts described by some historians as genocide against the Haudenosaunee nation. More than 40 villages were destroyed, along with stores of winter crops. More than 5,000 Haudenosaunee people fled to Canada as refugees.
- March 20, 1781: New York legislature authorizes a military tract as part of law to raise its quota of regiments.
- October 19, 1781: Cornwallis surrenders, end of Revolutionary War.
- July 25, 1782: Approximate boundaries (to be surveyed) of original 25 townships established by NY legislature.
- September 3, 1783: Treaty of Paris: Peace settlement with Great Britain.
- September 12, 1788: Treaty of Fort Stanwix: the Onondaga Indian title to the land was extinguished, and the Onondaga Indian Reservation created.
- February 25, 1789: Treaty at Albany: the Cayuga Indian title to the land was extinguished, and the Cayuga Indian Reservation created.
- 1789: Military tract surveyed.
- July 3, 1790: Names given to the first 25 townships at a meeting of the Commissioners of the Land Office of New York, chairman Governor George Clinton.
- 1791: Lots drawn and assigned to settlers.
- 1791: Name given to Township 26 (Junius) by Commissioners.
- 1792: Name given to Township 27 (Galen) by Commissioners.
- 1795: Name given to Township 28 (Sterling) by Commissioners.
- 1798: Deadline to settle.

== See also ==
- Military Tract of 1812
- Land grant

=== External links ===
- Names of Townships in the Military Tract
- History of The Military Tract Of Central NY
