= Cortland County, New York =

County in New York, United States

- County
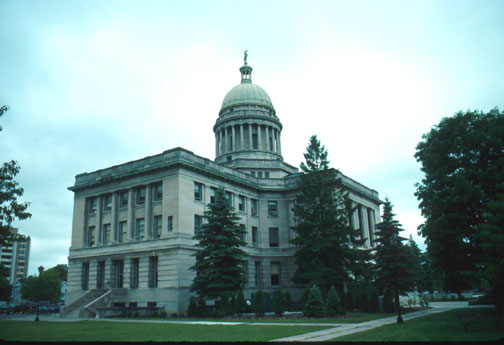
- Cortland County Courthouse

- Seal

- Location within the U.S. state of New York
- Coordinates: 42°36′00″N 76°04′00″W
- Country: United States
- State: New York
- Founded: 1808
- Named for: Pierre Van Cortlandt
- Seat: Cortland
- Largest city: Cortland

Area
  - Total: 502 sq mi (1,300 km^{2})
  - Land: 499 sq mi (1,290 km^{2})
  - Water: 2.8 sq mi (7.3 km^{2}) 0.5%

Population (2020)
  - Total: 46,809
  - Estimate (2025): 45,850 ▼
  - Density: 93.8/sq mi (36.2/km^{2})
- Time zone: UTC−5 (Eastern)
  - Summer (DST): UTC−4 (EDT)
- Congressional districts: 19th, 22nd
- Website: www.cortlandcountyny.gov

Cortland County is a county located in the U.S. state of New York. As of the 2020 census, the population of Cortland County was 46,809. The county seat is Cortland. The county is named after Pierre Van Cortlandt, president of the convention at Kingston that wrote the first New York State Constitution in 1777, and first lieutenant governor of the state. The county is part of the Central New York region of the state.

Cortland County comprises the Cortland, NY Micropolitan Statistical Area, which is also included in the Ithaca–Cortland, NY Combined Statistical Area.

The Cortland apple is named for the county.

== History ==
=== Early history ===
Located in the glaciated Appalachian Plateau area of Central New York, midway between Syracuse and Binghamton, this predominantly rural county is the southeastern gateway to the Finger Lakes Region. Scattered archaeological evidence indicates the Iroquois also known as the Haudenosaunee controlled the area beginning about AD 1500.

What was to become Cortland County remained within Indian territory until the American Revolution. It became part of the Military Tract, when, in 1781, more than 1¼ million acres (5,100 km^{2}) were set aside by the State's Legislature to compensate two regiments formed to protect the State's western section from the English and their Iroquois allies, at the close of the Revolution. To encourage settlement in the upstate isolated wilderness, the State constructed a road from Oxford through Cortland County to Cayuga Lake in 1792–94. This, and construction of privately financed roads, were the major impetus to settlement.

When counties were established in New York in 1683, the present Cortland County was part of Albany County, which encompassed the northern part of New York and all of the present State of Vermont, as well as indeterminate territory to west. On March 12, 1772, present day Cortland County became part of Tryon County, named for William Tryon, colonial governor of New York. In 1784, following the peace treaty that ended the American Revolutionary War, the name of the county was changed to honor General Richard Montgomery, who had captured several places in Canada and died attempting to capture the city of Quebec, thus replacing the name of the locally unpopular British governor. Present day Cortland County became part of Herkimer County in 1791, then became a part of Onondaga County when it split from Herkimer in 1794. Cortland County was formed by the splitting of Onondaga County in 1808.

=== Settlement of the county ===
Eastern New Yorkers and New Englanders, wanting new land to farm, welcomed the opening of this frontier. The first white settlement in the county was made in 1791 by Amos Todd, Joseph Beebe and Rhoda Todd Beebe, emigrants from Connecticut who paddled up the Tioughnioga River from Windsor, to live near the head of navigation in the Town of Homer. Following them came a flood of settlers who, in 1808, petitioned the State Legislature for county status. Thus, Cortland County was created from the southern half of Onondaga County as part of the Boston Ten Towns on April 8, 1808, and was named in honor of the Pierre Van Cortlandt family - Pierre, Sr. having been the first lieutenant governor of the state.

=== Nineteenth century ===
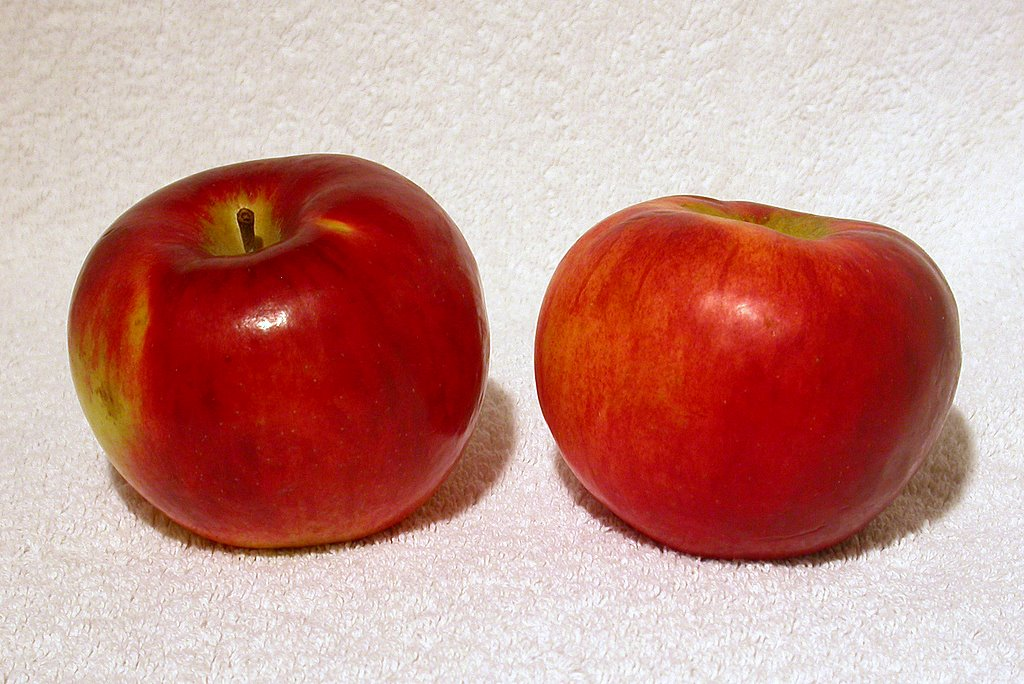
The Cortland variety of apple is named for the county.

The 76th New York Volunteer Infantry was one of the most famous of the New York units in the Civil War. It was raised in 1861 primarily from Cortland County and the surrounding areas (about a third of the men were from the Cherry Valley area). The 76th was in most of the major battles the Army of the Potomac fought from Second Bull Run through Petersburg, at which time the three-year enlistment of most of the men ran out and the 300 or so men remaining from the 1,100 who left Cortland either returned home or transferred to other units.

At the Battle of Gettysburg, the 76th New York was one of the first infantry regiments on the field, holding down the extreme right of the Union line on the first day. The regiment took huge casualties in that battle - nearly one-third of its strength - including its commander Major Andrew J. Grover, the first infantry officer killed in the battle.

=== Modern Cortland County ===
Today, Cortland county is noted for the production of CNC milling machines, hospitality supplies, medical instruments and components, textiles, electronic components, plastic consumer goods, components for NASA, and a variety of other goods and services. International exporting is an integral part of many of the corporations in the area.

The county's present reflects its past. Agribusiness flourishes, yet consistent with the pattern elsewhere in New York State, the number of farms has declined while farm size and yield have increased. Continued growth in the service and light industry sectors is contributing to the growing strength of the Central New York region and the Southern Tier region.

The loss of many of its local businesses has led to the current economic decline of the region. Cornell University, Syracuse University, Binghamton University, and Ithaca College are all within a 45-minute drive of the City of Cortland. The State University of New York College at Cortland is located within the county. Tompkins Cortland Community College, often referred to by the local residents as TC3, is located a short distance away in nearby Tompkins County.

== Government and politics ==
United States presidential election results for Cortland County, New York
Year	Republican		Democratic		Third party(ies)	
Year	No.	%	No.	%	No.	%
1884	4,042	55.35%	2,774	37.98%	487	6.67%
1888	4,732	55.97%	3,163	37.41%	560	6.62%
1892	4,134	53.57%	2,907	37.67%	676	8.76%
1896	4,939	63.39%	2,574	33.04%	278	3.57%
1900	4,895	60.99%	2,773	34.55%	358	4.46%
1904	5,222	63.34%	2,649	32.13%	373	4.52%
1908	5,090	62.26%	2,616	32.00%	470	5.75%
1912	2,959	39.99%	2,283	30.86%	2,157	29.15%
1916	4,521	59.21%	2,693	35.27%	422	5.53%
1920	9,606	76.75%	2,541	20.30%	369	2.95%
1924	10,032	76.93%	2,170	16.64%	839	6.43%
1928	11,960	75.37%	3,662	23.08%	247	1.56%
1932	9,859	67.60%	4,425	30.34%	301	2.06%
1936	11,718	70.43%	4,606	27.69%	313	1.88%
1940	12,233	70.26%	5,147	29.56%	31	0.18%
1944	10,450	67.68%	4,967	32.17%	24	0.16%
1948	10,433	68.27%	4,614	30.19%	236	1.54%
1952	13,985	77.32%	4,079	22.55%	24	0.13%
1956	14,085	79.59%	3,612	20.41%	0	0.00%
1960	12,305	67.48%	5,921	32.47%	9	0.05%
1964	6,149	35.61%	11,110	64.33%	11	0.06%
1968	10,209	60.76%	5,791	34.47%	801	4.77%
1972	12,885	70.97%	5,234	28.83%	37	0.20%
1976	11,222	61.32%	6,947	37.96%	131	0.72%
1980	9,885	54.77%	6,176	34.22%	1,987	11.01%
1984	13,691	67.70%	6,438	31.83%	95	0.47%
1988	10,934	58.26%	7,673	40.88%	162	0.86%
1992	7,782	37.32%	7,815	37.48%	5,254	25.20%
1996	7,606	39.11%	9,130	46.94%	2,713	13.95%
2000	9,857	47.56%	9,691	46.76%	1,178	5.68%
2004	11,613	51.02%	10,670	46.88%	477	2.10%
2008	9,678	44.15%	11,861	54.11%	381	1.74%
2012	8,695	44.31%	10,482	53.41%	447	2.28%
2016	9,900	48.90%	8,771	43.33%	1,573	7.77%
2020	10,789	49.77%	10,370	47.83%	520	2.40%
2024	11,706	53.06%	10,290	46.64%	67	0.30%

Although once a heavily Republican County rooted in Yankee tradition, Cortland County is a bellwether county, having voted for the national winner in every presidential election from 1980 to 2016. The city of Cortland itself, the largest city in the county, leans Democratic.

Republican Ronald Reagan scored landslide wins in the county in 1980 and 1984. Democrat Bill Clinton carried the county with pluralities in 1992 and 1996. Republican George W. Bush carried the county in 2000 and 2004, defeating Al Gore by less than 1% in 2000, and John Kerry by just over 4% in 2004. In 2008, Barack Obama defeated John McCain 54-44%, and in 2012 he defeated Mitt Romney by a similar margin. The last Democrat to win a majority in Cortland County prior to Obama was Lyndon Johnson in 1964.

In 2020, Cortland County's streak of voting for the winner ended, as Joe Biden defeated Republican incumbent Donald Trump. Had the streak continued, it would have been tied with Clallam County, Washington for the longest active streak in the nation, as the streaks of longstanding bellwethers Valencia County, New Mexico and Vigo County, Indiana also ended in 2020. Cortland was one of five counties in the state that Trump carried by less than 500 votes.

Cortland County's lawmaking body is the legislature, which consists of 17 members. All are elected from single member districts.

== Geography ==
According to the U.S. Census Bureau, the county has a total area of 502 square miles (1,300 km^{2}), of which 499 square miles (1,290 km^{2}) is land and 2.8 square miles (7.3 km^{2}) (0.5%) is water.

Cortland County is sometimes considered to be part of Central New York and Southern Tier regions of New York and is also somewhat to the southwest of the center of New York, south of Syracuse and north of Binghamton.

=== Adjacent counties ===
- Onondaga County - north
- Madison County - northeast
- Chenango County - east
- Broome County - south
- Tompkins County - west
- Tioga County - southwest
- Cayuga County - northwest

=== Major highways ===
- Interstate 81
- U.S. Route 11
- New York State Route 13
- New York State Route 41
- New York State Route 90
- New York State Route 392

== Demographics ==
Historical population
Census	Pop.	Note	%±
1810	8,869		—
1820	16,507		86.1%
1830	23,791		44.1%
1840	24,607		3.4%
1850	25,140		2.2%
1860	26,294		4.6%
1870	25,173		−4.3%
1880	25,825		2.6%
1890	28,657		11.0%
1900	27,576		−3.8%
1910	29,249		6.1%
1920	29,625		1.3%
1930	31,709		7.0%
1940	33,668		6.2%
1950	37,158		10.4%
1960	41,113		10.6%
1970	45,894		11.6%
1980	48,820		6.4%
1990	48,963		0.3%
2000	48,599		−0.7%
2010	49,336		1.5%
2020	46,809		−5.1%
2025 (est.)	45,850	▼	−2.0%
U.S. Decennial Census; 1790-1960 1900-1990; 1990-2000 2010-2020

=== 2020 census ===
Cortland County, New York – Racial and ethnic composition Note: the US Census treats Hispanic/Latino as an ethnic category. This table excludes Latinos from the racial categories and assigns them to a separate category. Hispanics/Latinos may be of any race.
Race / Ethnicity (NH = Non-Hispanic)	Pop 1980	Pop 1990	Pop 2000	Pop 2010	Pop 2020	% 1980	% 1990	% 2000	% 2010	% 2020
White alone (NH)	47,848	47,838	46,748	46,252	40,801	98.01%	97.70%	96.19%	93.75%	87.16%
Black or African American alone (NH)	291	317	399	705	829	0.60%	0.65%	0.82%	1.43%	1.77%
Native American or Alaska Native alone (NH)	89	131	131	126	113	0.18%	0.27%	0.27%	0.26%	0.24%
Asian alone (NH)	165	207	198	412	1,018	0.34%	0.42%	0.41%	0.84%	2.17%
Native Hawaiian or Pacific Islander alone (NH)	x	x	5	3	6	x	x	0.01%	0.01%	0.01%
Other race alone (NH)	42	23	33	14	204	0.09%	0.05%	0.07%	0.03%	0.44%
Mixed race or Multiracial (NH)	x	x	520	730	2,180	x	x	1.07%	1.48%	4.66%
Hispanic or Latino (any race)	385	447	565	1,094	1,658	0.79%	0.91%	1.16%	2.22%	3.54%
Total	48,820	48,963	48,599	49,336	46,809	100.00%	100.00%	100.00%	100.00%	100.00%

=== 2000 census ===
As of the census of 2000, there were 48,599 people, 18,210 households, and 11,617 families residing in the county. The population density was 97 people per square mile (37 people/km^{2}). There were 20,116 housing units at an average density of 40 units per square mile (15/km^{2}). The racial makeup of the county was 96.95% White, 0.86% Black or African American, 0.27% Native American, 0.41% Asian, 0.01% Pacific Islander, 0.32% from other races, and 1.18% from two or more races. 1.16% of the population were Hispanic or Latino of any race. 17.3% were of English, 16.9% Irish, 14.2% German, 13.0% Italian and 9.9% American ancestry according to Census 2000. 96.0% spoke English and 1.4% Spanish as their first language.

There were 18,210 households, out of which 31.00% had children under the age of 18 living with them, 49.20% were married couples living together, 10.30% had a female householder with no husband present, and 36.20% were non-families. 26.50% of all households were made up of individuals, and 10.40% had someone living alone who was 65 years of age or older. The average household size was 2.50 and the average family size was 3.00.

In the county, the population was spread out, with 23.70% under the age of 18, 15.50% from 18 to 24, 26.50% from 25 to 44, 21.80% from 45 to 64, and 12.50% who were 65 years of age or older. The median age was 34 years. For every 100 females there were 93.50 males. For every 100 females age 18 and over, there were 90.00 males.

The median income for a household in the county was $34,364, and the median income for a family was $42,204. Males had a median income of $30,814 versus $22,166 for females. The per capita income for the county was $16,622. About 9.30% of families and 15.50% of the population were below the poverty line, including 16.40% of those under age 18 and 10.80% of those age 65 or over.

As of 2014 the largest self-reported ancestry groups in Cortland County, New York were:

- English - 17.7%
- Irish - 12.9%
- German - 11.9%
- Italian - 8.8%
- "American" - 6.9%
- French (except Basque) - 2.8%
- Dutch - 2.7%
- Polish - 2.2%
- Scottish - 2.1%

As of 2015 the largest self-reported ancestry groups in Cortland County, New York were:

- English - 18.8%
- Irish - 12.3%
- German - 10.8%
- Italian - 8.1%
- "American" - 7.3%
- Dutch - 2.5%
- Scottish - 2.3%
- French (except Basque) - 2.2%
- Polish - 2.1%

As of 2016 the largest self-reported ancestry groups in Cortland County, New York were:

- English - 19.8%
- Irish - 11.9%
- German - 10.2%
- Italian - 8.0%
- "American" - 6.9%
- Dutch - 2.4%
- Scottish - 2.0%
- French (except Basque) - 2.3%
- Polish - 2.1%

== Education ==
Area schools include:

- State University of New York at Cortland
- Tompkins Cortland Community College
- Cincinnatus Central School District
- Cortland City School District
- Homer Central School District
- Marathon Central School District
- McGraw Central School District

== Communities ==
=== Larger settlements ===
#	Location	Population	Type	Town(s) within
1	†Cortland	19,204	City	Cortlandville
2	Homer	3,291	Village	Cortlandville, Homer
3	Munsons Corners	2,728	CDP	Cortlandville
4	Cortland West	1,356	CDP	Cortlandville
5	McGraw	1,053	Village	Cortlandville
6	Marathon	919	Village	Marathon
7	Blodgett Mills	303	CDP	Cortlandville
8	Virgil	298	CDP	Virgil

=== Towns ===
- Cincinnatus
- Cortlandville
- Cuyler
- Freetown
- Harford
- Homer
- Lapeer
- Marathon
- Preble
- Scott
- Solon
- Taylor
- Truxton
- Virgil
- Willet

== Notable people ==
- William Dillon, composer, lyricist, and vaudevillian
- Ronnie James Dio, former frontman for Rainbow and Black Sabbath; a street in the city of Cortland is named for him (Dio Way)
- Nancy Duffy, Syracuse news personality; founder of the Syracuse St. Patrick's Day Parade
- John McGraw, Hall of Fame Major League Baseball player and manager from the town of Truxton
- Alton B. Parker, Democratic candidate for president in 1904
- Arthur C. Sidman, playwright and vaudevillian
- Elmer Ambrose Sperry, prolific inventor who invented gyroscopic compass and held over 400 patents; the USS Sperry is named after him

== See also ==
- List of counties in New York
- National Register of Historic Places listings in Cortland County, New York
- Svend O. Heiberg Memorial Forest
