= National Register of Historic Places listings in Cortland County, New York =

Location of Cortland County in New York

List of the National Register of Historic Places listings in Cortland County, New York:

This is intended to be a complete list of properties and districts listed on the National Register of Historic Places in Cortland County, New York. The locations of National Register properties and districts (at least for all showing latitude and longitude coordinates below) may be seen in a map by clicking on "Map of all coordinates".

This National Park Service list is complete through NPS recent listings posted January 23, 2026.

Contents: Counties in New York
Albany (Albany) – Allegany – Bronx – Broome – Cattaraugus – Cayuga – Chautauqua – Chemung – Chenango – Clinton – Columbia – Cortland – Delaware – Dutchess (Poughkeepsie, Rhinebeck) – Erie (Buffalo) – Essex – Franklin – Fulton – Genesee – Greene – Hamilton – Herkimer – Jefferson – Kings – Lewis – Livingston – Madison – Monroe (Rochester) – Montgomery – Nassau – New York (Below 14th Street, 14th to 59th Streets, 59th to 110th Streets, Above 110th Street, Islands) – Niagara (Niagara Falls) – Oneida – Onondaga (Syracuse) – Ontario – Orange – Orleans – Oswego – Otsego – Putnam – Queens – Rensselaer – Richmond – Rockland – St. Lawrence – Saratoga – Schenectady – Schoharie – Schuyler – Seneca – Steuben – Suffolk – Sullivan – Tioga – Tompkins – Ulster – Warren – Washington – Wayne – Westchester (Northern, Southern, New Rochelle, Peekskill, Yonkers) – Wyoming – Yates

== Listings county-wide ==
	Name on the Register	Image	Date listed	Location	City or town	Description
1	Benton-Sherwood House		February 2, 2026 (#100012671)	79 Central Avenue; 42°36′01″N 76°10′28″W	Cortland	
2	Cincinnatus Historic District	Cincinnatus Historic District	September 7, 1984 (#84002208)	Main St. and Taylor Ave. 42°32′31″N 75°54′16″W	Cincinnatus	Historic district in this very small town
3	Cortland County Courthouse	Cortland County Courthouse	October 9, 1974 (#74001228)	Courthouse Park; 42°35′56″N 76°10′37″W	Cortland	
4	Cortland County Poor Farm	Cortland County Poor Farm	October 29, 1982 (#82001115)	Northeast of Cortland off NY 13; 42°37′36″N 76°08′14″W	Cortland	
5	Cortland Fire Headquarters	Cortland Fire Headquarters	July 12, 1974 (#74001229)	21 Court St. 42°35′57″N 76°10′46″W	Cortland	
6	Cortland Free Library	Cortland Free Library	May 30, 2008 (#08000469)	32 Church Street; 42°35′59″N 76°10′41″W	Cortland	
7	Crescent Corset Company	Crescent Corset Company	June 21, 2016 (#16000391)	166-177 Main St. 42°35′39″N 76°10′48″W	Cortland	1923 clothing factory employed many of the Italian immigrants to the area
8	First Presbyterian Church	First Presbyterian Church	January 24, 2002 (#01001502)	Courtland Cty Rd. 108B; 42°44′06″N 76°08′47″W	Preble	
9	First Presbyterian Church Complex	First Presbyterian Church Complex	March 6, 2002 (#02000142)	23 Church St. 42°35′57″N 76°10′41″W	Cortland	
10	Glen Haven District No. 4 School and Public Library		May 23, 1997 (#97000420)	7325 Fair Haven Rd. 42°45′39″N 76°16′04″W	Fair Haven	
11	Glenwood Cemetery	Glenwood Cemetery	January 31, 2019 (#100003395)	51 S. West St. 42°37′58″N 76°11′32″W	Homer	
12	William J. Greenman House	William J. Greenman House	August 18, 2011 (#11000542)	27 N. Church St. 42°36′15″N 76°10′40″W	Cortland	
13	Hatheway Homestead	Hatheway Homestead	January 20, 1978 (#78001848)	NY 41; 42°35′50″N 76°01′10″W	Solon	
14	Little York Pavilion	Little York Pavilion	July 27, 1979 (#79001575)	South of Preble off NY 281; 42°42′37″N 76°09′11″W	Preble	
15	Main Street Historic District	Main Street Historic District	September 25, 1986 (#86002773)	Roughly on Main St. between South and Washington Sts. 42°35′46″N 76°05′35″W	McGraw	
16	Old Homer Village Historic District	Old Homer Village Historic District	October 2, 1973 (#73001176)	N.and S. Main St., Central Park, Clinton, James, Cayuga, and Albany Sts. 42°38′11″N 76°10′50″W	Homer	
17	Peck Memorial Library	Peck Memorial Library	May 19, 1992 (#92000557)	28 E. Main St. 42°26′28″N 76°02′00″W	Marathon	
18	Presbyterian Church of McGraw	Presbyterian Church of McGraw	September 11, 1986 (#86002517)	3 W. Main St. 42°35′44″N 76°05′45″W	McGraw	
19	Randall Farm	Randall Farm	June 2, 2000 (#00000573)	3713 Page Green Rd. 42°35′06″N 76°10′49″W	Cortland	
20	Stage Coach Inn	Stage Coach Inn	December 11, 2009 (#09001080)	2548 Clarks Corners Rd. 42°26′27″N 76°06′03″W	Lapeer	
21	Tarbell Building	Tarbell Building	November 22, 2000 (#00001408)	2 Cortland St. 42°26′31″N 76°01′58″W	Marathon	
22	Taylor Center Methodist Episcopal Church and Taylor District #3 School	Taylor Center Methodist Episcopal Church and Taylor District #3 School	July 30, 2010 (#10000513)	4332-4338 Cheningo-Solon Pond Rd. 42°36′59″N 75°55′32″W	Taylor Center	
23	Tompkins Street Historic District	Tompkins Street Historic District	March 18, 1975 (#75001179)	Tompkins and intersecting streets from Main St. to Cortland Rural Cemetery; 42°35′43″N 76°11′12″W	Cortland	
24	Town Line Bridge	Town Line Bridge	May 29, 2008 (#08000470)	Town Line Rd. 42°33′57″N 75°52′57″W	Taylor	
25	Truxton Depot	Truxton Depot	September 25, 2008 (#08000930)	Railroad St. 42°42′31″N 76°01′49″W	Truxton	
26	Union Valley Congregational Church	Union Valley Congregational Church	December 31, 2002 (#02001639)	Union Valley Cross Rd. 42°38′01″N 75°53′00″W	Taylor	
27	Unitarian Universalist Church	Unitarian Universalist Church	July 1, 1993 (#93000592)	3 Church St. 42°36′05″N 76°10′41″W	Cortland	Cobblestone church
28	US Post Office-Cortland	US Post Office-Cortland	November 17, 1988 (#88002475)	88 Main St. 42°35′54″N 76°10′51″W	Cortland	
29	US Post Office-Homer	US Post Office-Homer	May 11, 1989 (#88002502)	2 S. Main St. 42°38′44″N 76°10′46″W	Homer	
30	Water, Wall, and Pine Streets Lenticular Truss Bridges	Water, Wall, and Pine Streets Lenticular Truss Bridges	October 5, 1977 (#77000938)	Wall, Water and Pine Sts. 42°38′15″N 76°10′36″W	Homer	

== See also ==
- National Register of Historic Places listings in New York
