= Lapeer, New York =

- Town
- Location within Cortland County and New York

- Location in the United States Lapeer (New York)
- Coordinates: 42°26′33″N 76°6′18″W
- Country: United States
- State: New York
- County: Cortland

Government
  - Type: Town Council
  - Town Supervisor: Gary F. Cornell (R)
  - Town Council: Members' List: • Michael G. Hammond (R); • John R. Robinson (R); • Irene J. Russell (R); • Steven E. Phillips (R)

Area
  - Total: 25.18 sq mi (65.22 km^{2})
  - Land: 25.04 sq mi (64.85 km^{2})
  - Water: 0.14 sq mi (0.37 km^{2})
- Elevation: 1,410 ft (430 m)

Population (2010)
  - Total: 767
  - Estimate (2016): 737
  - Density: 29.4/sq mi (11.36/km^{2})
- Time zone: UTC-5 (Eastern (EST))
  - Summer (DST): UTC-4 (EDT)
- ZIP code: 13803 (Marathon)
- Area code: 607
- FIPS code: 36-023-41300
- GNIS feature ID: 0979132

Lapeer is a town in Cortland County, New York, United States. The population was 767 at the 2010 census. Lapeer is on the southern border of Cortland County and is south of the city of Cortland.

== History ==
The town was within the Central New York Military Tract.

The first outside settler arrived around 1799. His name was Primus Grant, a Black man from Guiana. He is buried on a bluff overlooking a stream known as "Big Brook". Unfortunately, little is known of him, his family, how he arrived in the area, or his history.

Lapeer was formed from the town of Virgil in 1845.

Lapeer is a dry town, meaning the consumption and possession of alcohol within the boundaries of the community is prohibited.

The Stage Coach Inn was listed on the National Register of Historic Places in 2009.

== Geography ==
According to the United States Census Bureau, the town has a total area of 25.2 square miles (65.2 km^{2}), of which 25.1 square miles (64.9 km^{2}) is land and 0.15 square miles (0.4 km^{2}), or 0.57%, is water.

The south town line is the border of Tioga and Broome counties.

The Tioughnioga River, Interstate 81, and U.S. Route 11 all pass across the northeastern corner of Lapeer. New York State Route 221 is an east-west highway in the town.

The eastern half of the town drains east and south to the Tioughnioga River, while the western half drains west and south to the East Branch of Owego Creek. Both waterways are part of the Susquehanna River watershed.

== Demographics ==
Historical population
Census	Pop.	Note	%±
1850	750		—
1860	803		7.1%
1870	735		−8.5%
1880	757		3.0%
1890	585		−22.7%
1900	538		−8.0%
1910	475		−11.7%
1920	423		−10.9%
1930	393		−7.1%
1940	450		14.5%
1950	432		−4.0%
1960	459		6.3%
1970	507		10.5%
1980	592		16.8%
1990	613		3.5%
2000	686		11.9%
2010	767		11.8%
2020	795		3.7%
U.S. Decennial Census

As of the census of 2000, there were 686 people, 245 households, and 188 families residing in the town. The population density was 27.4 inhabitants per square mile (10.6/km^{2}). There were 269 housing units at an average density of 10.7 per square mile (4.1/km^{2}). The racial makeup of the town was 98.25% White, 0.29% Native American, 0.44% Asian, and 1.02% from two or more races. Hispanic or Latino of any race were 0.15% of the population.

There were 245 households, out of which 39.2% had children under the age of 18 living with them, 66.1% were married couples living together, 5.7% had a female householder with no husband present, and 22.9% were non-families. 17.6% of all households were made up of individuals, and 3.7% had someone living alone who was 65 years of age or older. The average household size was 2.80 and the average family size was 3.20.

In the town, the population was spread out, with 29.6% under the age of 18, 9.5% from 18 to 24, 29.0% from 25 to 44, 24.3% from 45 to 64, and 7.6% who were 65 years of age or older. The median age was 34 years. For every 100 females, there were 103.0 males. For every 100 females age 18 and over, there were 98.0 males.

The median income for a household in the town was $35,250, and the median income for a family was $36,250. Males had a median income of $27,500 versus $21,397 for females. The per capita income for the town was $15,484. About 11.1% of families and 10.7% of the population were below the poverty line, including 16.0% of those under age 18 and 6.3% of those age 65 or over.

== Communities and locations in Lapeer ==
- Beaver Pond – A small lake at the southern town line.
- Hunts Corners – A hamlet on NY-221, situated south of Lapeer village.
- Lapeer – The hamlet of Lapeer is near the town center.
- Lapeer Church – A location north of Lapeer village.
- Quail Hollow – A small valley in the western part of Lapeer.
