= Samuel G. Hathaway =

American politician

Samuel Gilbert Hathaway (July 18, 1780 – May 2, 1867) was an American politician who served one term as a U.S. representative from New York from 1833 to 1835.

== Biography ==
Born in Freetown, Massachusetts, Hathaway attended the public schools. He worked at various occupations and made one sea voyage. He moved to Chenango County, New York, in 1803 and two years later to Cincinnatus, Cortland County, and engaged in agricultural pursuits.

=== Career ===
He was in the Justice of the Peace 1810–1858. He served as member of the State assembly in 1814 and 1818. He moved to Solon, New York, in 1819. He served in the State senate in 1823. Major general in the New York Militia 1823–1858.

=== Congress ===
Hathaway was elected as a Jacksonian to the Twenty-third Congress (March 4, 1833 – March 3, 1835).

=== Later career and death ===
He served as presidential elector on the Democratic ticket in 1852. He served as delegate to the Democratic National Convention at Charleston, South Carolina, in 1860.

He died in Solon, New York, May 2, 1867. He was interred in the family cemetery near Solon.

== Legacy ==
His home at Solon, known as the Hatheway Homestead, was listed on the National Register of Historic Places in 1978.

New York State Senate
Preceded by new district	New York State Senate; Sixth District (Class 1); 1823	Succeeded by Latham A. Burrows
U.S. House of Representatives
Preceded by seat created	Member of the U.S. House of Representatives from New York's 22nd congressional district 1833–1835	Succeeded by Joseph Reynolds
