= Katharine May Edwards =

American classics professor

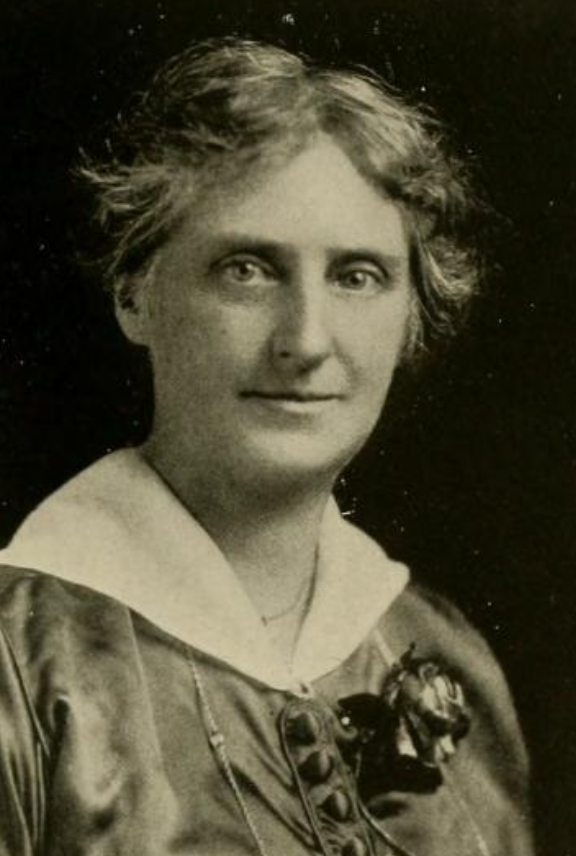
- Katharine May Edwards, from the 1915 yearbook of Wellesley College
- Born: May 10, 1862; Cortland, New York
- Died: May 21, 1952 (aged 90); Woodbury, Connecticut
- Occupations: College professor, classicist

Katharine May Edwards (May 10, 1862 – May 21, 1952) was an American college professor and classicist.

== Early life ==
Edwards was born in Cortland, New York, the daughter of Timothy Edwards and Hulda Ann Uptegrove Edwards. She earned a bachelor's degree at Cornell University in 1888. She had a fellowship in Greek at Bryn Mawr College from 1888 to 1889, and completed doctoral studies at Cornell in 1895. Later in life she was president of the Cornell Women's Club of Boston.

== Career ==
Edwards taught Greek and comparative philology at Wellesley College from 1889 until her retirement in 1928. She was president of the Phi Beta Kappa chapter in Massachusetts, and an active member of the American Philological Association. She was vice-president of the Wellesley Golf Club.

Edwards was a member of the managing committee of the American School of Classical Studies at Athens for thirty years, from 1922 to 1952, and a member of the executive committee from 1922 to 1927. After she retired from Wellesley, she catalogued over 10,000 coins found in the excavations at Corinth. Her efforts resulted in Coins, 1896-1929, a 1933 report. She wrote an updated report on the coins found at Corinth for Hesperia in 1937.

== Personal life ==
Edwards died in 1952, aged 90 years, in Woodbury, Connecticut.
