= Taylor, New York =

- Town
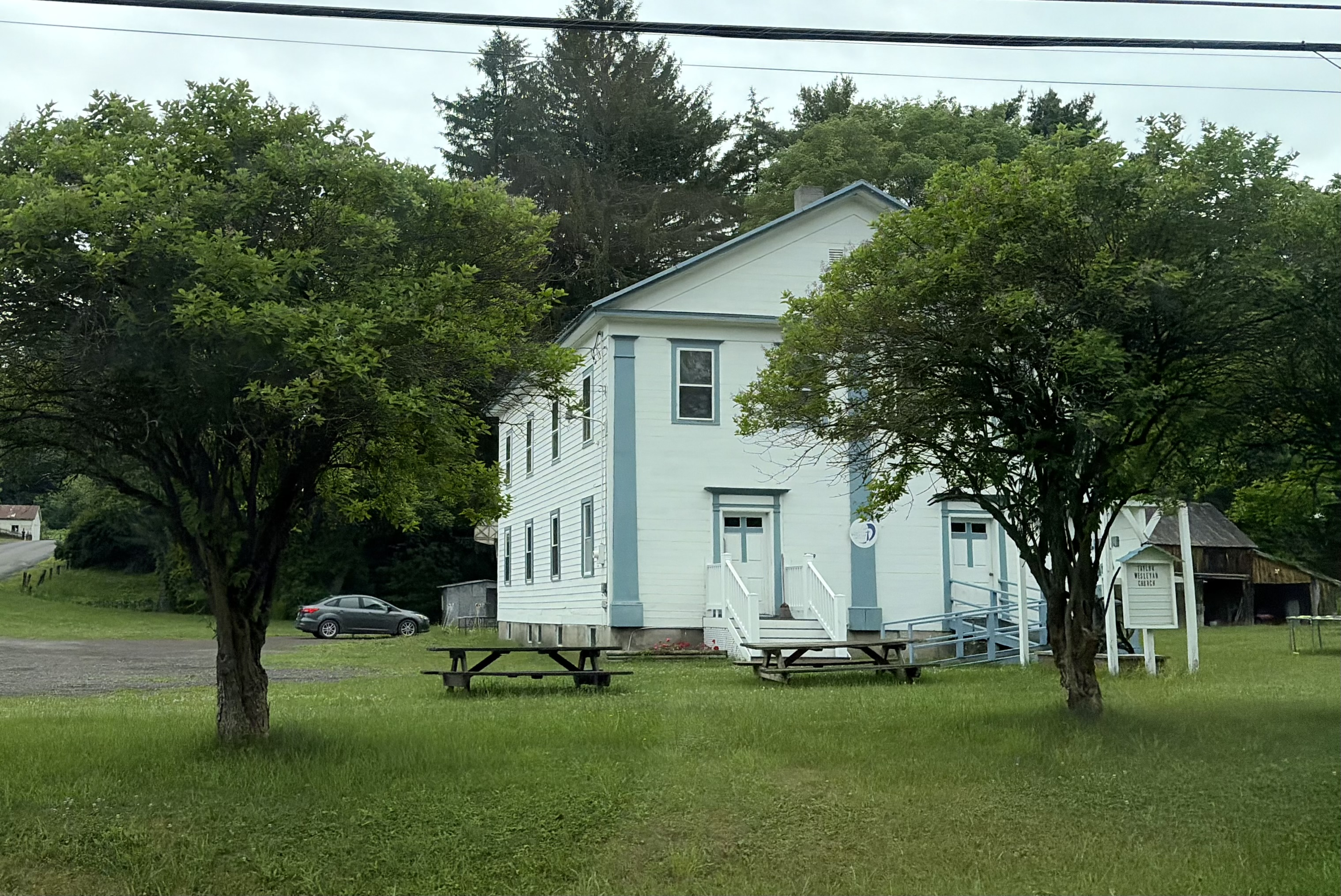
- The Taylor Wesleyan Church

- Location within Cortland County and New York

- Location in the United States Taylor (New York)
- Coordinates: 42°36′23″N 75°55′7″W
- Country: United States
- State: New York
- County: Cortland
- Created: 1849

Government
  - Type: Town Council
  - Town Supervisor: Marie A. Peri (R)
  - Town Council: Members' List: • Sharon A. Eltz (R); • Jeffrey F. Smith (R); • Lynott R. Jordan (R); • Nancy Elwood (R)

Area
  - Total: 30.12 sq mi (78.01 km^{2})
  - Land: 30.00 sq mi (77.69 km^{2})
  - Water: 0.12 sq mi (0.32 km^{2})
- Elevation: 1,480 ft (450 m)

Population (2010)
  - Total: 523
  - Estimate (2016): 495
  - Density: 16.5/sq mi (6.37/km^{2})
- Time zone: UTC-5 (Eastern (EST))
  - Summer (DST): UTC-4 (EDT)
- ZIP Code: 13040 (Cincinnatus); 13136 (Pitcher)
- Area code: 607
- FIPS code: 36-023-73220
- GNIS feature ID: 0979541
- Website: taylorny.org

Taylor is a town in Cortland County, New York, United States. The town is in the eastern part of the county and is east of Cortland. The population was 523 at the 2010 census. The town is named after General Zachary Taylor, later the 12th president of the United States.

== History ==
Taylor was within the Central New York Military Tract. The first settlers arrived around 1793.

The town was formed from the town of Solon in 1849. By 1865, the population was 1,167.

The Town Line Bridge and Union Valley Congregational Church are listed on the National Register of Historic Places.

== Geography ==
According to the United States Census Bureau, the town has a total area of 30.1 square miles (78.0 km^{2}), of which 30.0 square miles (77.7 km^{2}) is land and 0.12 square miles (0.3 km^{2}) (0.41%) is water.

The eastern town line is the border of Chenango County.

New York State Route 26 passes across the southeastern part of the town.

== Demographics ==
Historical population
Census	Pop.	Note	%±
1850	1,201		—
1860	1,265		5.3%
1870	1,016		−19.7%
1880	993		−2.3%
1890	815		−17.9%
1900	762		−6.5%
1910	711		−6.7%
1920	647		−9.0%
1930	504		−22.1%
1940	531		5.4%
1950	496		−6.6%
1960	474		−4.4%
1970	493		4.0%
1980	481		−2.4%
1990	542		12.7%
2000	500		−7.7%
2010	523		4.6%
2016 (est.)	495		−5.4%
U.S. Decennial Census

As of the census of 2000, there were 500 people, 177 households, and 138 families residing in the town. The population density was 16.6 inhabitants per square mile (6.4/km^{2}). There were 216 housing units at an average density of 7.2 per square mile (2.8/km^{2}). The racial makeup of the town was 98.20% White, 0.20% African American, 0.20% Native American, 0.20% Asian, and 1.20% from two or more races. Hispanic or Latino of any race were 2.00% of the population.

There were 177 households, out of which 36.7% had children under the age of 18 living with them, 65.0% were married couples living together, 7.9% had a female householder with no husband present, and 21.5% were non-families. 16.4% of all households were made up of individuals, and 5.1% had someone living alone who was 65 years of age or older. The average household size was 2.82 and the average family size was 3.12.

In the town, the population was spread out, with 27.8% under the age of 18, 6.4% from 18 to 24, 31.0% from 25 to 44, 25.4% from 45 to 64, and 9.4% who were 65 years of age or older. The median age was 37 years. For every 100 females, there were 108.3 males. For every 100 females age 18 and over, there were 107.5 males.

The median income for a household in the town was $37,031, and the median income for a family was $39,500. Males had a median income of $29,444 versus $22,727 for females. The per capita income for the town was $16,677. About 8.2% of families and 11.4% of the population were below the poverty line, including 12.7% of those under age 18 and 9.3% of those age 65 or over.

== Communities and locations in Taylor ==
- Potter Hill – A community in the northeastern part of the town that once included a school, cemetery and several houses, which is now part of Cuyler Hill State Forest.
- Solon Pond – A small lake near the town's center.
- Taylor – A hamlet in the southeastern corner of the town by the town line on NY Route 26. It was once called "East Solon", "Taylorville", and "Bangall".
- Taylor Center – A hamlet adjacent to Solon Pond near the town center. It was once called "Solon Pond" after the nearby lake. The Taylor Center Methodist Episcopal Church and Taylor District No. 3 School was added to the National Register of Historic Places in 2010.
- Taylor Valley – A hamlet northwest of Taylor hamlet and southwest of Taylor Center. It takes its name from a valley in the western part of the town.
- Union Valley (formerly "Dorantown") – A hamlet in the northeastern part of the town.

== Notable person ==
- Gary Wood (1942–1994), NFL quarterback for the New York Giants and New Orleans Saints
