= Cortland City School District =

School district in New York, United States

Cortland Enlarged City School District

Location
- 1 Valley View Dr; Cortland, New York (Cortland County), 13045 United States
- Coordinates: 42.58983°N 76.17332°W

District information
- Type: Public
- Motto: Committed to Excellence
- Grades: K - 12
- Superintendent: Robert J. Edwards
- Schools: 3Elementary, 1 Junior/Senior High School
- NCES District ID: 3608460.

Students and staff
- Students: 2,715
- Teachers: 210.58(on an FTE basis)
- Student–teacher ratio: 12.89
- District mascot: Tiger
- Colors: Purple and White

Other information
- Average class size: 21
- Campus type: Suburban
- Communities served: Cortland, Virgil, Cortlandville
- Website: www.cortlandschools.org

The Cortland Enlarged City School District is a public school district in Cortland, New York. The district consists of 6 schools and with a total enrollment of approximately 2,800 students. The Cortland City District includes the city of Cortland, the town of Virgil, and part of the town of Cortlandville.

The school board consists of 7 members.

== K-6 schools ==
Barry Primary serves students in grades K, 1 and 2. Smith Intermediate serves students in grades 3 & 4. Randall Middle serves students in grades 5 & 6.

== All Schools ==
- F. S. Barry Primary School
- F. E. Smith Intermediate School
- Randall Middle School
- Cortland Junior and Senior High School
