= Cortland station =

Cortland
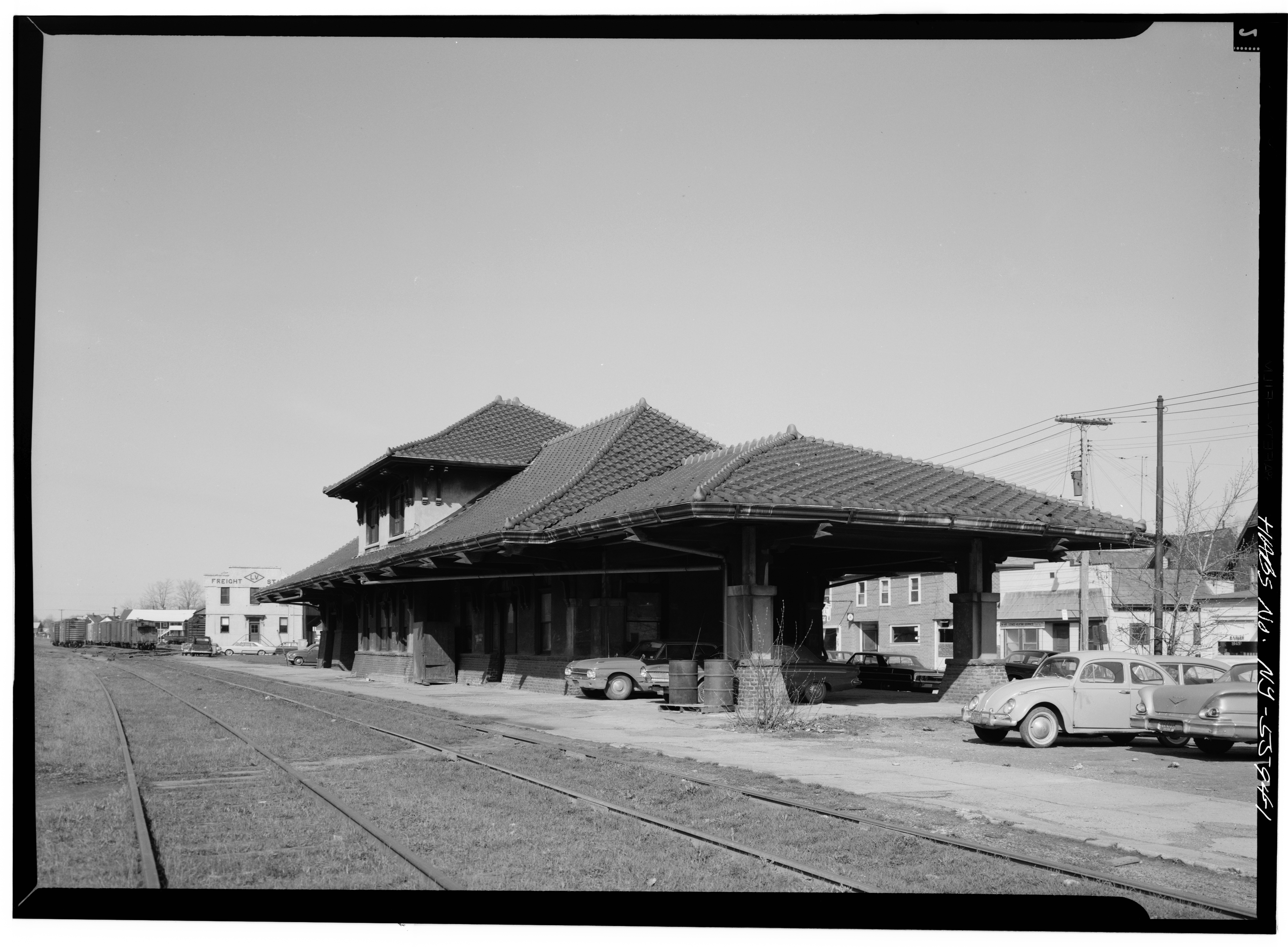
- Cortland in 1966

General information
- Location: 7 South Avenue; Cortland, New York
- Coordinates: 42.592022°N 76.180599°W
- Line: New York, Susquehanna and Western Railway

History
- Opened: April 4, 1911
- Closed: April 25, 1948

Former lines
Preceding station	Lehigh Valley Railroad	Following station
Gracie toward Elmira	Elmira and Cortland Branch	Lorings toward Camden
Location

Cortland station is a defunct Lehigh Valley Railroad station in Cortland, New York. It was located on the Lehigh Valley's Elmira and Cortland Branch. The station building still stands; the tracks are owned by the New York, Susquehanna and Western Railway. Cortland was one of two depots; the Delaware, Lackawanna and Western Railroad (Lackawanna) depot was located on Railroad Street in the center of the city.

== History ==
The first railroad to reach Cortland was the Syracuse and Binghamton Railroad, a forerunner of the Delaware, Lackawanna and Western Railroad, which opened a line between Syracuse, New York, and Binghamton, New York, on October 18, 1854. It was joined in 1872 by the New York and Oswego Midland Railroad, which extended west from its existing line at Norwich, New York, to Freeville, New York. This line was later leased by the Elmira, Cortland and Northern Railroad, which in turn became part of the Lehigh Valley Railroad in 1896.

The present building was constructed in 1910–1911, with a formal opening on April 4, 1911. The brick building measured 155 by 50 feet (47 by 15 m) and stood two stories tall. The space was sufficient to contain a waiting room, baggage room, a "women's retiring room", a smoking room, and a ticket office. The second floor was given over to company offices. It replaced the original station, which had served both freight and passengers. A new freight house was also built.

Traffic declined on the Elmira and Cortland Branch after World War I, and the Lehigh Valley gradually reduced service throughout the 1930s and 1940s. The last scheduled passenger service, between Cortland and DeRuyter, New York, ended on April 25, 1948. Limited service remained in the form of mixed trains. Even these ended south of Cortland on April 30, 1950, leaving a roundtrip between Cortland and Canastota, New York. This was effectively withdrawn after 1954. Lackawanna passenger service ended on September 15, 1958.

The Lehigh Valley abandoned the branch north of Cortland in 1967. Most of the branch south of Cortland was out of service by the mid-1970s. Conrail, successor to the Lehigh Valley, abandoned all but 3 miles (4.8 km) within the vicinity of Cortland. This line is owned by the New York, Susquehanna and Western Railway.
