= Glenwood Cemetery (Homer, New York) =

Historic cemetery in Homer, New York

- U.S. National Register of Historic Places
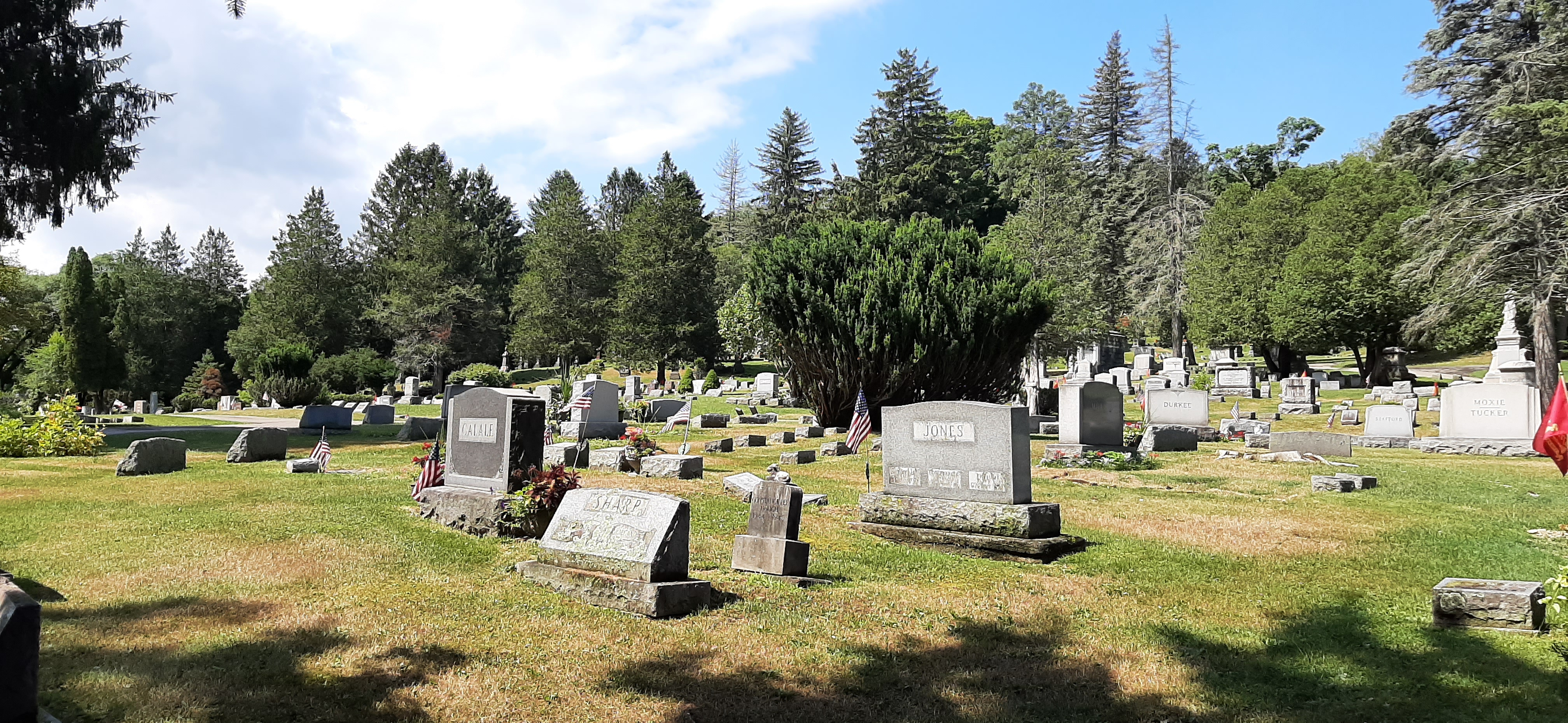
- Cemetery in 2022

- Location within New York
- Location: 51 S. West St., Homer, New York
- Coordinates: 42.633°N 76.192°W
- Architectural style: Rural cemetery
- NRHP reference No.: 100003395
- Added to NRHP: January 31, 2019

The Glenwood Cemetery in the village of Homer, New York is a historic rural cemetery which was established in 1867. It was listed on the National Register of Historic Places in 2019.

The village of Homer is within the town of Homer in Cortland County, New York. Some previous burials from another location were relocated to the cemetery after it was formally established.

A first cemetery association in Homer was established in 1847; many of its early burials were later removed to the Glenwood Cemetery, whose association was incorporated in 1862. A plaque near the entrance to the cemetery states that "Glenwood was opened and named in the year of 1867 by Paris Barber 1814–1876, a public spirited citizen of Homer New York." The Village of Homer took over management of the cemetery in 1946, upon request from the association. Eventually a Village Cemetery Commission, part of the Village of Homer, took over responsibility to oversee the cemetery.

It was deemed significant for NRHP listing for reasons including that its landscape design was deemed "a representative intact example of a mid-nineteenth century Rural Cemetery with portions at extreme east and west ends reflecting twentieth century design trends in cemetery management." Another reason was its architecture, specifically it having three significant buildings, one being the combination of the Earle Abbey Mausoleum (1923) and its receiving vault (1906).

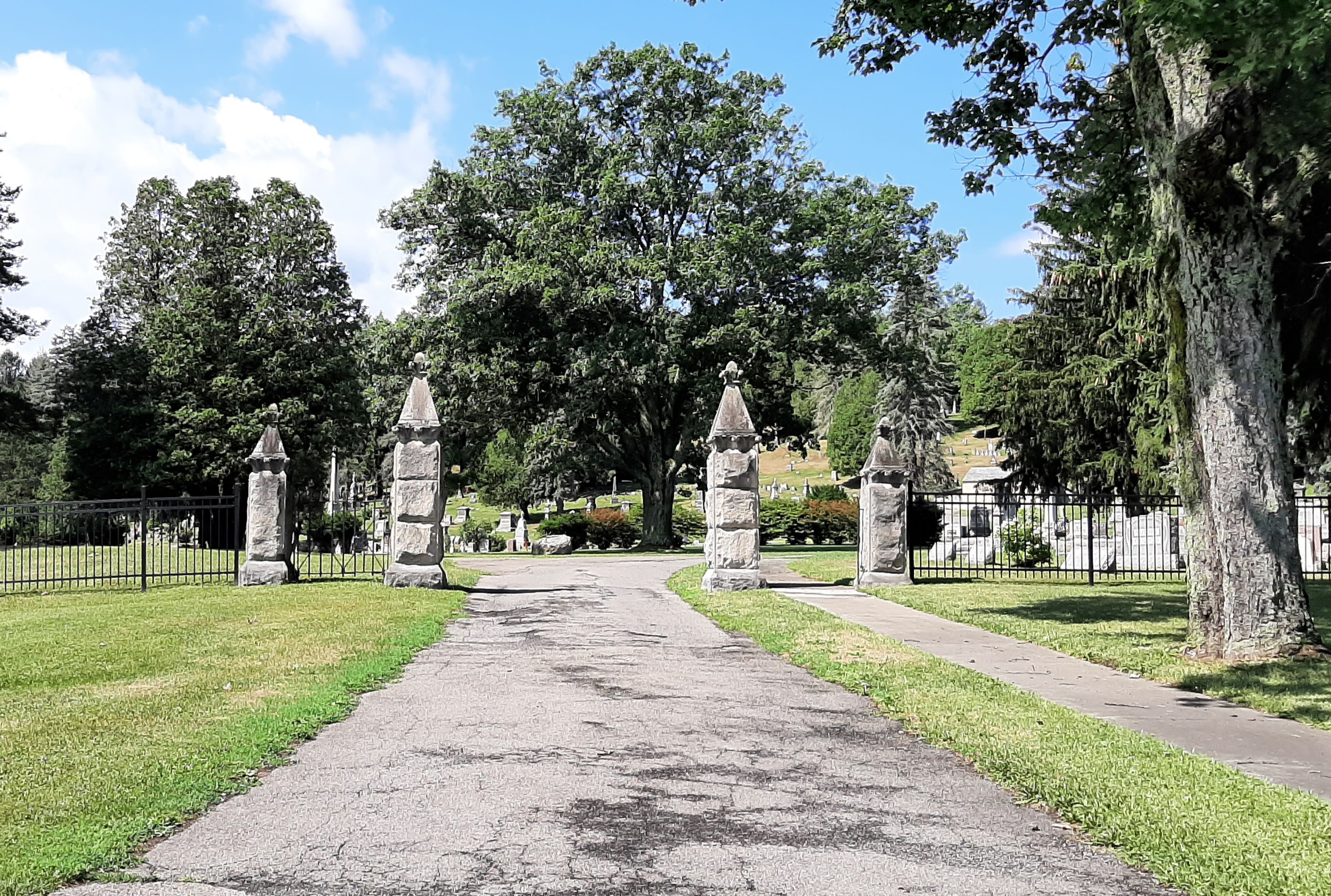
Corner (original?) entrance

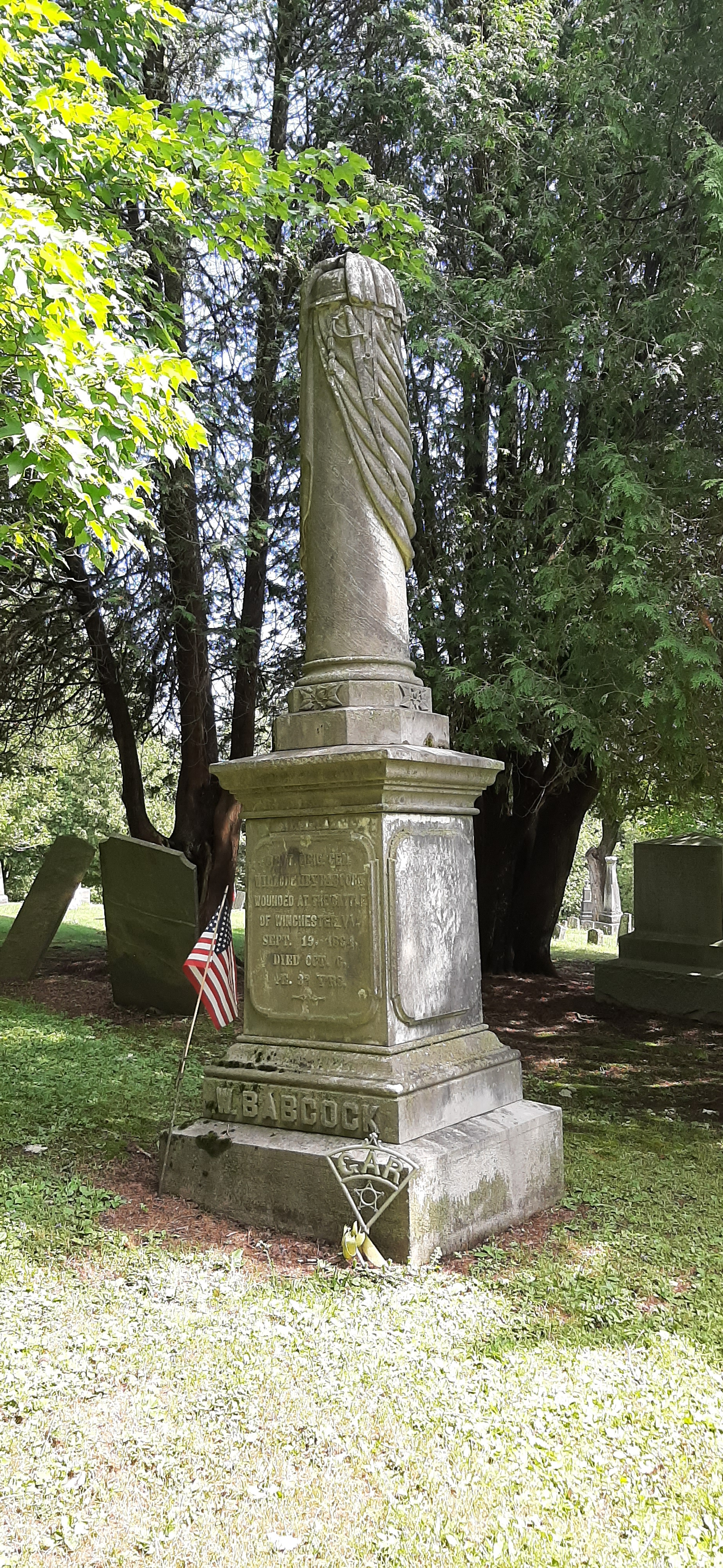
W. Babcock, wounded at Battle of Winchester, September 19, 1864, died October 6.

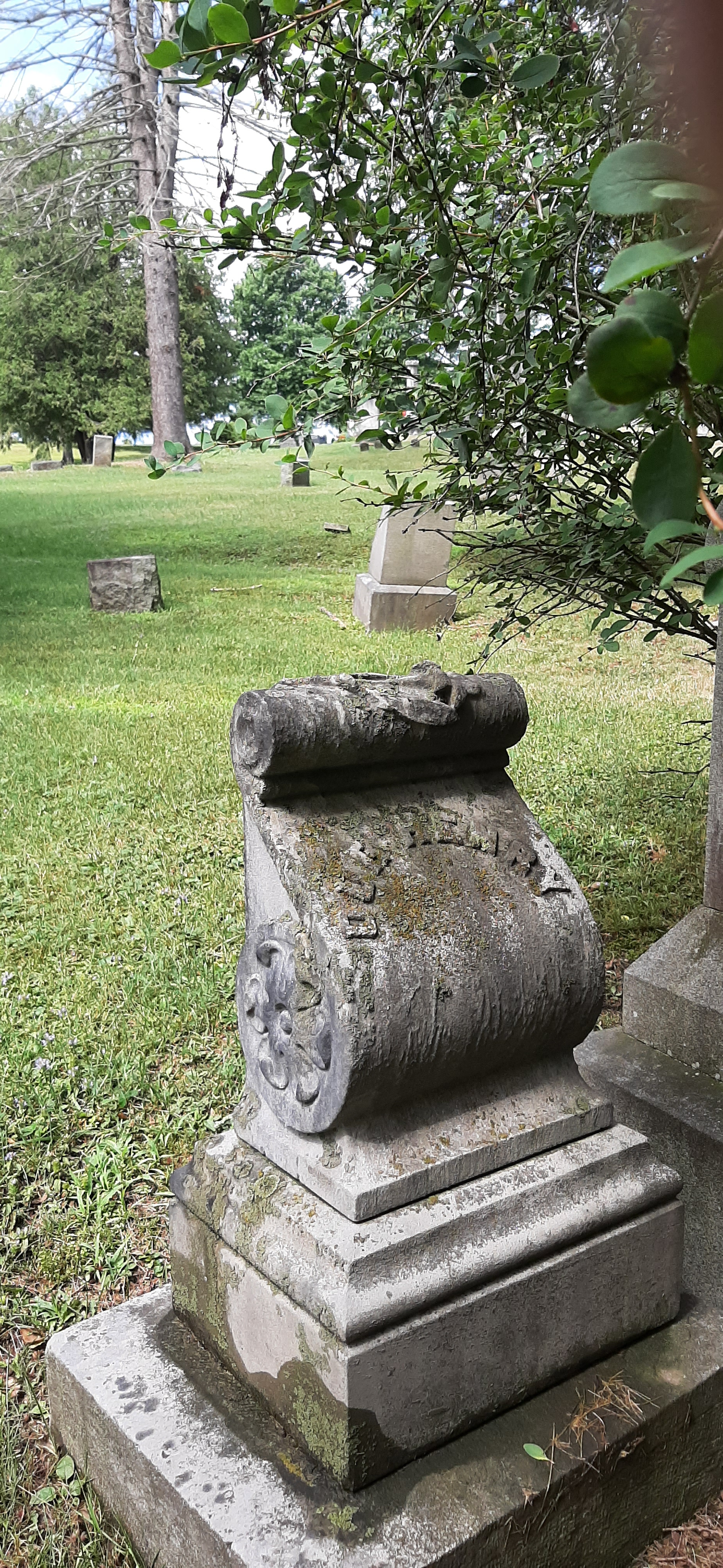
Oul Hemry(?)

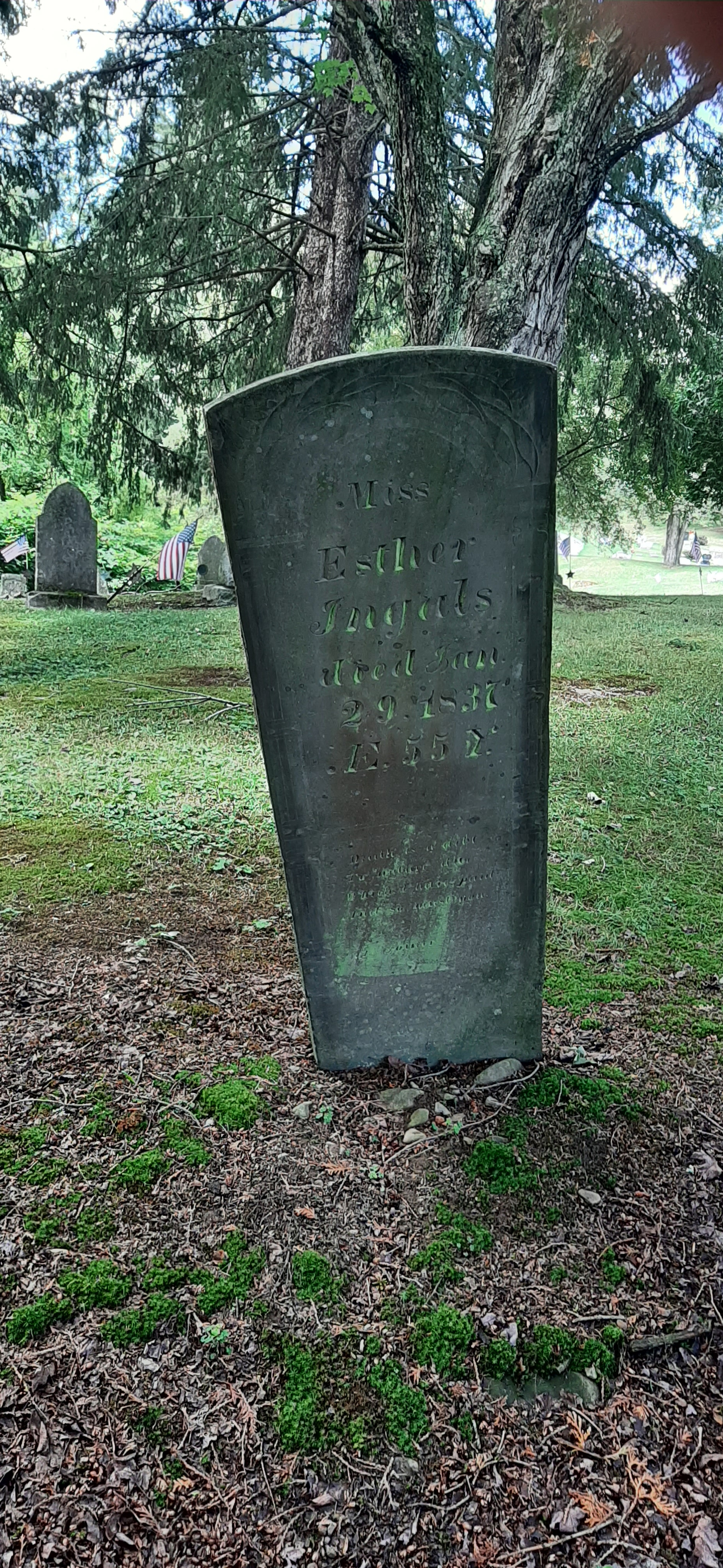
?
