= Cincinnatus Historic District =

Historic district in New York, United States

- U.S. National Register of Historic Places
- U.S. Historic district
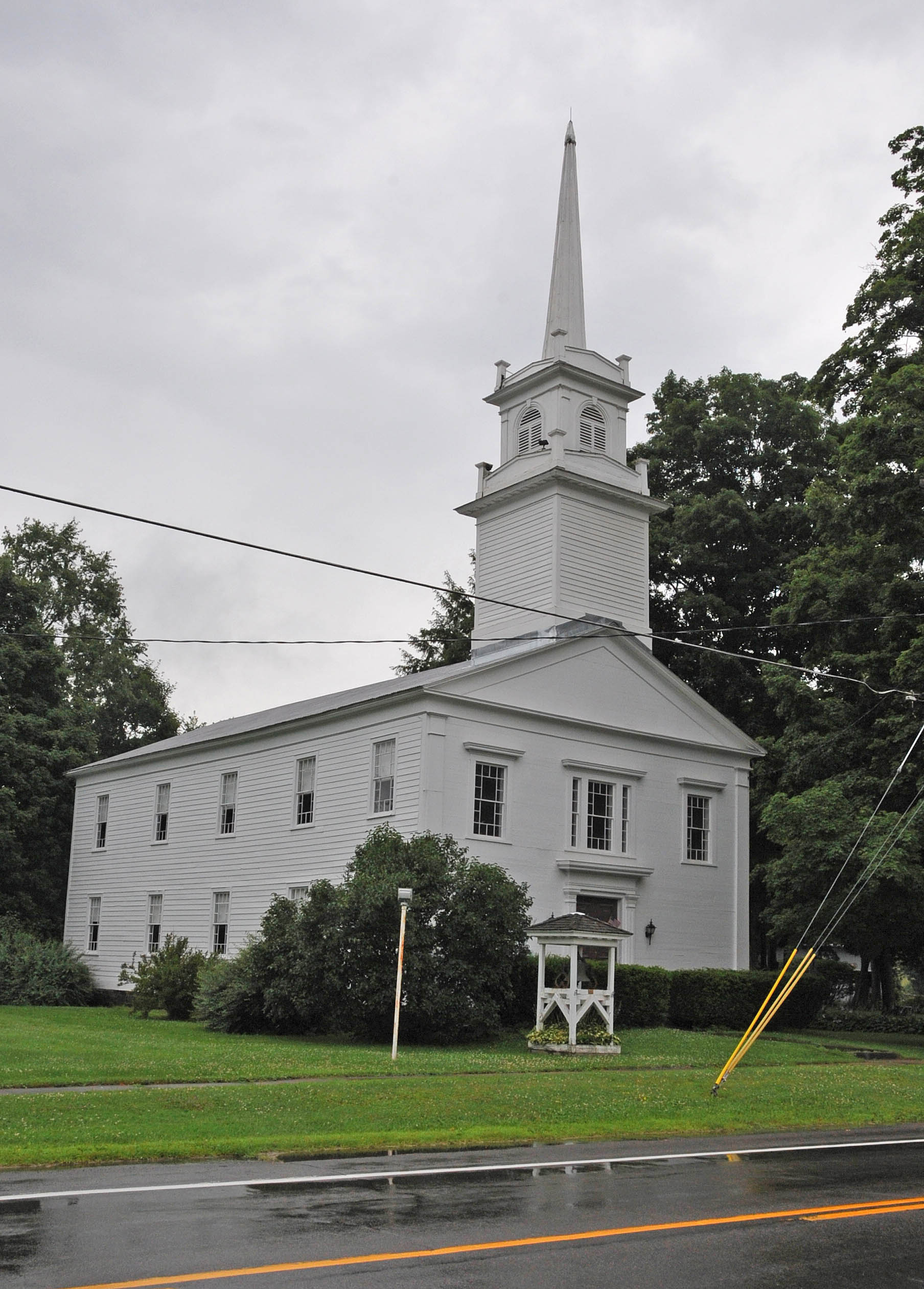

- Location within New York Location within the United States
- Location: Main St. and Taylor Ave., Cincinnatus, New York
- Coordinates: 42°32′31″N 75°54′16″W
- Area: 11.5 acres (47,000 m^{2})
- Built: c. 1830 through 1930
- Architect: Carl W. Clark, and others
- Architectural style: Greek Revival, Other, Federal
- NRHP reference No.: 84002208
- Added to NRHP: September 7, 1984

Cincinnatus Historic District is a historic district in Cincinnatus, New York that was listed on the National Register of Historic Places in 1984.

It consists of 14 properties with 27 contributing structures dating from c.1830 to 1930: a former church, a library, and 12 residences, plus related outbuildings.

The properties included are:

- former Congregational Church (Heritage Hall)
  - 2781 Taylor Ave.
- former Congregational Church Manse (Rogers/Seeley residence)
  - 5691 Main St.
- Kellogg Free Library
  - Main St. & Taylor Ave.
- Kingman Store (Speciale residence)
  - 5680 Main St.
- Barnes-Brown residence
  - 2789 Taylor Ave.
- Rockwell-Randal residence
  - 2797 Taylor Ave.
- Meldrin-Totman residence
  - 2803 Taylor Ave.
- Staley residence
  - 2809 Taylor Ave.
- Brown-Forshee residence
  - 2815 Taylor Ave.
- Smith-Wight residence
  - 2800 Taylor Ave.
- Shore residence
  - 2794 Taylor Ave.
- Kingman-Pryor residence
  - 2788 Taylor Ave.
- Covert-Simonet/Kopecky residence
  - 2770 Taylor Ave.
- White-Glazen residence
  - 2769 Taylor Ave.

In July 1984, the Kellogg Free Library filed notification to the New York State Office of Parks that it did not wish to have the Rogers-Seeley residence listed as part of the district; no reason was cited. The Rogers-Seeley residence remained on the application that was approved for inclusion on the National Register.
