= Tarbell Building =

Historic commercial building in New York, United States

- U.S. National Register of Historic Places
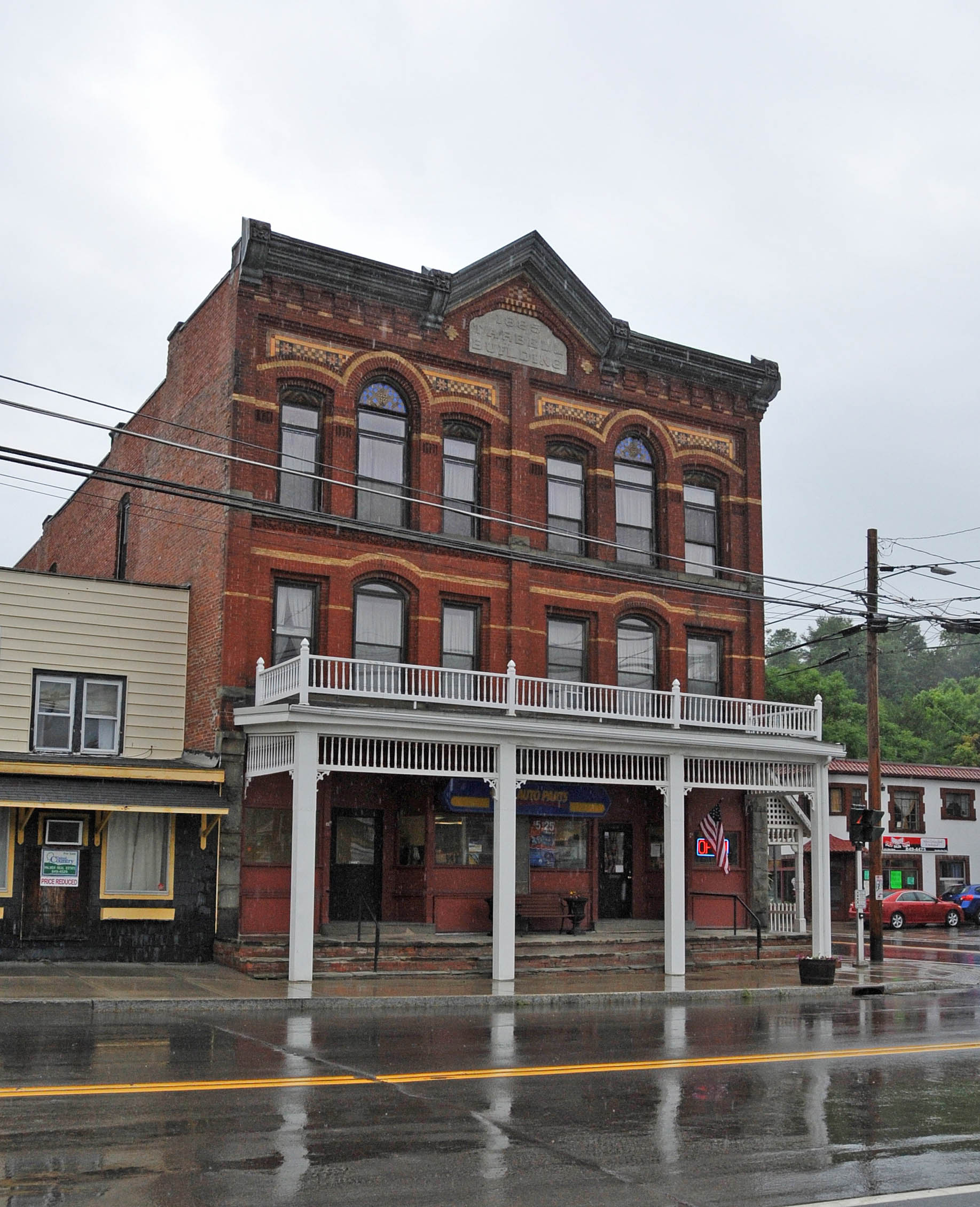

- Location within New York Location within the United States
- Location: 2 Cortland St., Marathon, New York
- Coordinates: 42°26′31″N 76°1′58″W
- Area: less than one acre
- Built: 1885
- Architectural style: Queen Anne
- NRHP reference No.: 00001408
- Added to NRHP: November 22, 2000

The Tarbell Building is a historic commercial building located in the Village of Marathon in Cortland County, New York. It is a three-story brick structure constructed in 1885 in the Queen Anne style. It has retail storefronts on the first floor and apartments and storage on the second and third. A rock-faced foundation pierced with basement windows is exposed on the south side. The Tarbell Building was listed on the National Register of Historic Places in 2000.

It was built by Gage E. Tarbell (1856-1936), who rose from poor boy to become, over time, a jeweler, lawyer, mining promoter and insurance broker. He served as vice president of the Equitable Assurance Company. Tarbell again commissioned fine architecture at Garden City, a model suburb he later helped develop on Long Island.
