= Cortland Fire Headquarters =

Historic fire station in New York State, US

- U.S. National Register of Historic Places
- New York State Register of Historic Places
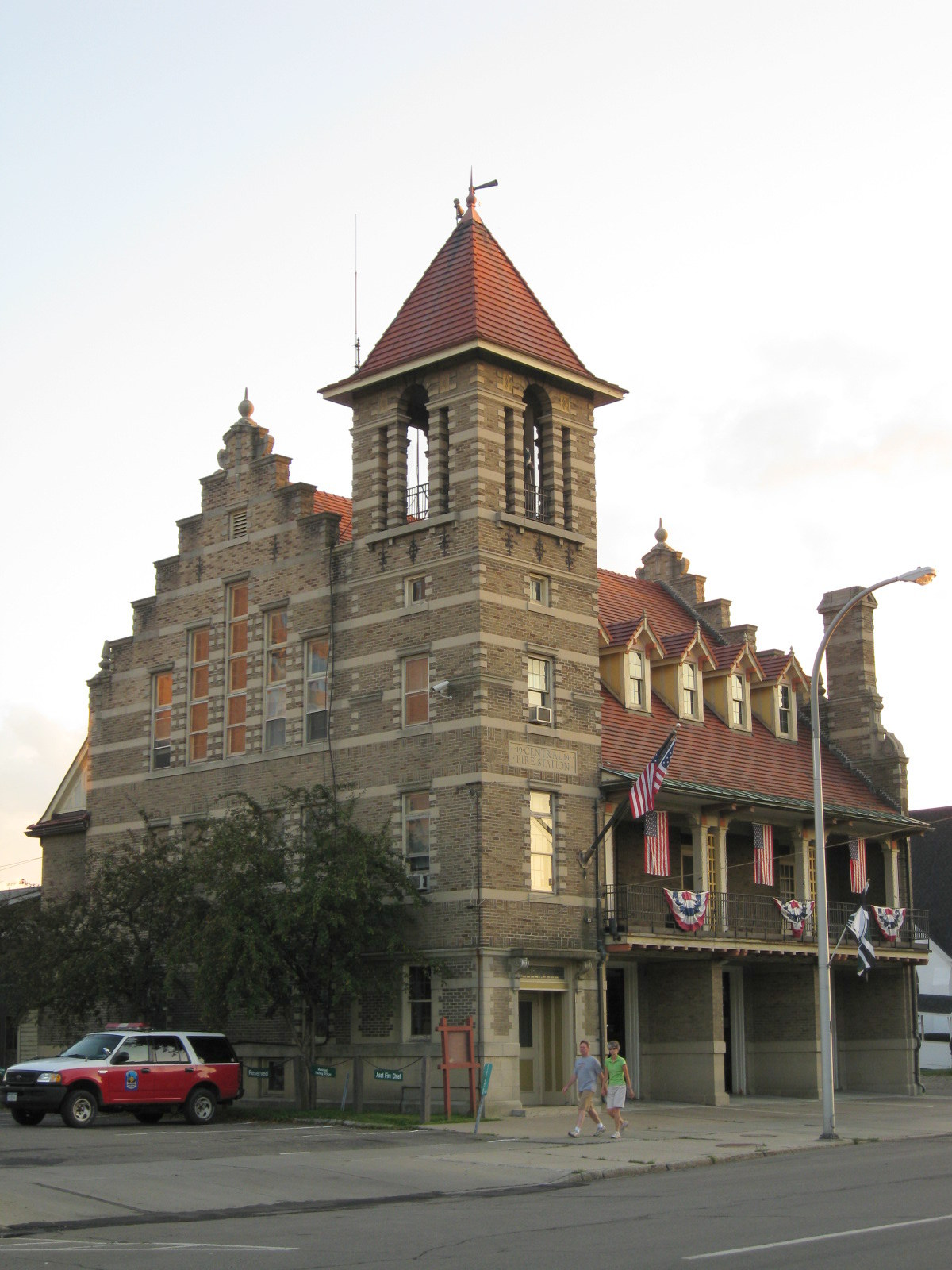
- Cortland Fire Headquarters, August 2009

- Location within New York Location within the United States
- Location: 21 Court St., Cortland, New York
- Coordinates: 42°35′57″N 76°10′46″W
- Area: less than one acre
- Built: 1914
- Architect: Sackett & Park
- NRHP reference No.: 74001229
- NYSRHP No.: 02340.000007

Significant dates
- Added to NRHP: July 12, 1974
- Designated NYSRHP: June 23, 1980

Cortland Fire Headquarters is a historic fire station located at Cortland in Cortland County, New York. It is a three-story, predominantly rectangular structure, consisting of stepped gables, square bell tower, yellow faced brick, and tiled roof, built in 1914. The first floor houses fire apparatus, the second serves as quarters for firefighters, and the third is a meeting hall and training area, as well as the home for the special operations division.

It was listed on the National Register of Historic Places in 1974.
