= First Presbyterian Church Complex (Cortland, New York) =

Historic church in New York, United States

- U.S. National Register of Historic Places
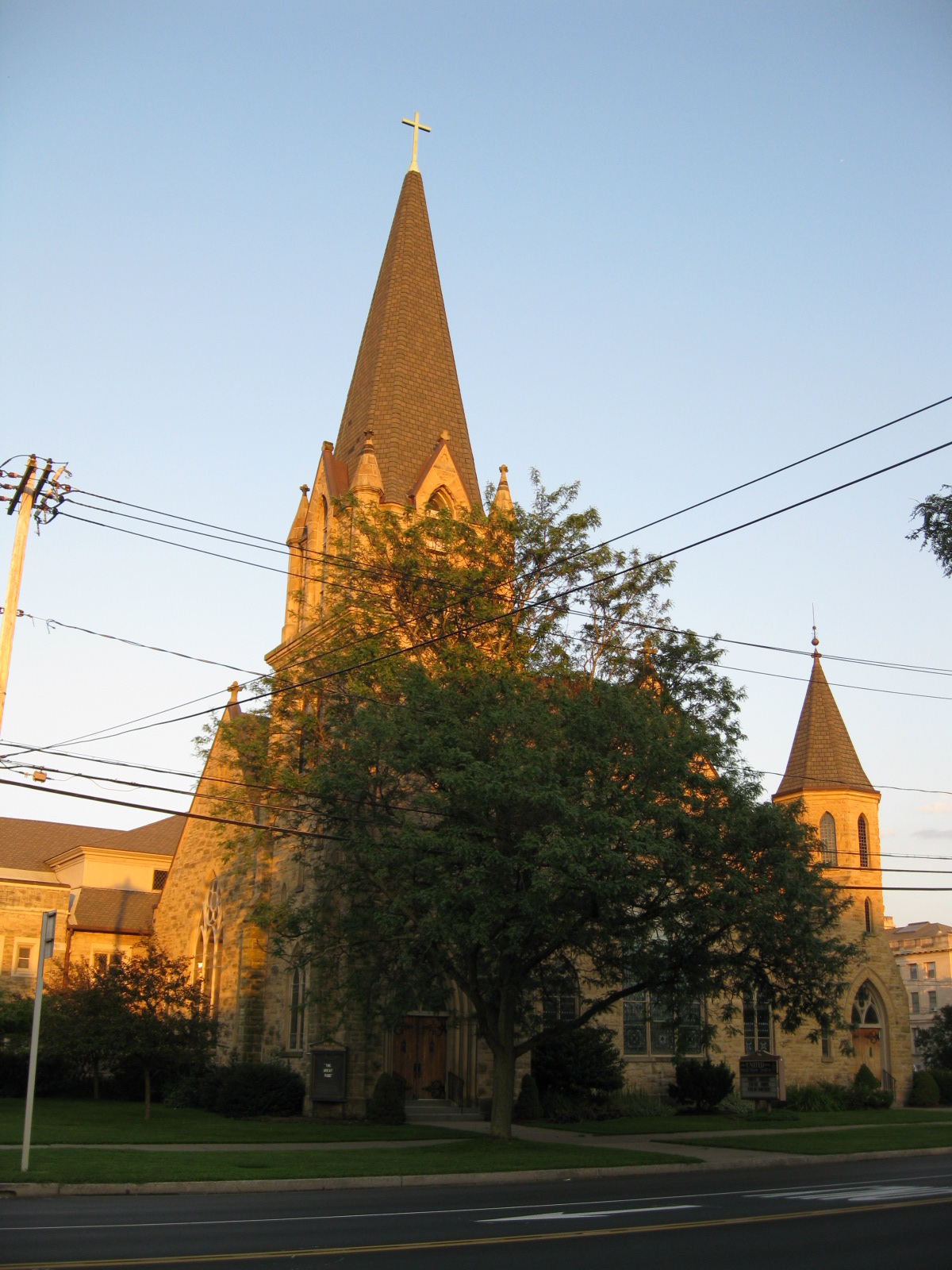
- First Presbyterian Church, Cortland NY, August 2009

- Location within New York Location within the United States
- Location: 23 Church St., Cortland, New York
- Coordinates: 42°35′57″N 76°10′41″W
- Area: 1 acre (0.40 ha)
- Built: 1889
- Architect: Reed, Samuel Burrage; et al.
- Architectural style: Late Victorian, Late 19th And 20th Century Revivals
- NRHP reference No.: 02000142
- Added to NRHP: March 06, 2002

First Presbyterian Church Complex, also known as United Presbyterian Church, is a historic Presbyterian church located at Cortland in Cortland County, New York. It was built in 1889–1890 and is a solid massed masonry building consisting of a central hip-roofed main block fronted by steeply pitched gable projections. Major additions to the original church were completed in 1922 and 1958. The church features a stout, multi stage bell tower with a tall steeple and prominent cross on the spire. Also on the property is a Queen Anne style manse completed in 1903.

It was listed on the National Register of Historic Places in 2002.
