= Hatheway Homestead =

Historic house in New York, United States

- U.S. National Register of Historic Places
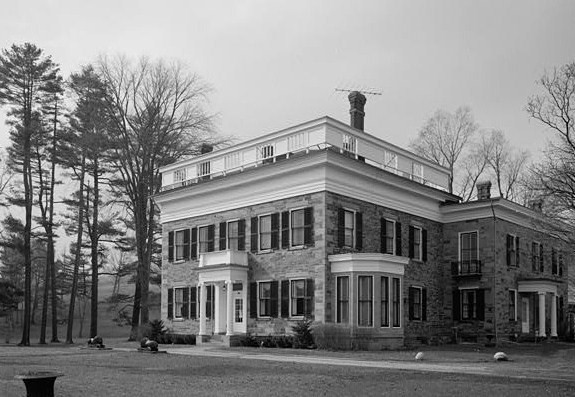
- Hatheway Homestead, 1966

- Location within New York Location within the United States
- Location: NY 41, Solon, New York
- Coordinates: 42°35′50″N 76°1′10″W
- Area: 1 acre (0.40 ha)
- Built: 1844
- Architectural style: Greek Revival
- NRHP reference No.: 78001848
- Added to NRHP: January 20, 1978

Hatheway Homestead, also known as Tinelli's Hathaway House, is a historic home located at Solon in Cortland County, New York. It consists of a 2 1/2-story main block built in 1844, with a later 2-story wing addition, in the Greek Revival style. It was built by Major General Samuel G. Hathaway (1790–1867). The main block is constructed of smooth-surfaced fieldstone and wing of random ashlar stone blocks. The main block features a distinctive parapet of alternating balustrade and panels. It was later converted for use as a restaurant.

It was listed on the National Register of Historic Places in 1978.
