= Solon, New York =

- Town
- Location within Cortland County and New York

- Location in the United States Solon (New York)
- Coordinates: 42°35′48″N 76°1′24″W
- Country: United States
- State: New York
- County: Cortland

Government
  - Type: Town Council
  - Town Supervisor: Cynthia A. Monroe (D, R)
  - Town Council: Members' List: • Andrew R. Euson (R); • Stephen A. Furlin (R); • Gerald A. Craig (R); • Robert A. Hotaling, Jr. (R)

Area
  - Total: 29.73 sq mi (76.99 km^{2})
  - Land: 29.65 sq mi (76.80 km^{2})
  - Water: 0.077 sq mi (0.20 km^{2})
- Elevation: 1,371 ft (418 m)

Population (2010)
  - Total: 1,079
  - Estimate (2016): 1,061
  - Density: 35.8/sq mi (13.82/km^{2})
- Time zone: UTC-5 (Eastern (EST))
  - Summer (DST): UTC-4 (EDT)
- ZIP Codes: 13101 (McGraw); 13040 (Cincinnatus)
- FIPS code: 36-023-68264
- GNIS feature ID: 0979502
- Website: www.townofsolon.com

Solon is a town in Cortland County, New York, United States. The town had a total population of 1,079 as of the 2010 census. The name of the town comes from the Greek lawmaker Solon.

The town is in the center of the county, east of the city of Cortland.

== History ==
The region was part of the Central New York Military Tract used to pay soldiers of the American Revolution. Solon was first settled in 1794.

The town was created from part of the town of Homer in 1798, before the formation of Cortland County. Solon lost territory to the towns of Truxton (1811) and Taylor (1849).

The population of the town reached a peak of 2,311 in 1840. By 1865, the population had dropped to 995.

The Hatheway Homestead was listed on the National Register of Historic Places in 1978.

== Geography ==
According to the United States Census Bureau, the town has a total area of 29.7 square miles (77.0 km^{2}), of which 29.7 square miles (76.8 km^{2}) is land and 0.077 square miles (0.2 km^{2}), or 0.26%, is water.

New York State Route 41 is an east-west highway in the town.

== Demographics ==
Historical population
Census	Pop.	Note	%±
1820	1,262		—
1830	2,033		61.1%
1840	2,426		19.3%
1850	1,057		−56.4%
1860	1,148		8.6%
1870	872		−24.0%
1880	842		−3.4%
1890	687		−18.4%
1900	622		−9.5%
1910	518		−16.7%
1920	498		−3.9%
1930	483		−3.0%
1940	486		0.6%
1950	522		7.4%
1960	549		5.2%
1970	687		25.1%
1980	865		25.9%
1990	1,008		16.5%
2000	1,108		9.9%
2010	1,079		−2.6%
2016 (est.)	1,061		−1.7%
U.S. Decennial Census

As of the year 2000 census, there were 1,108 people, 382 households, and 310 families residing in the town. The population density was 37.3 inhabitants per square mile (14.4/km^{2}). There were 419 housing units at an average density of 14.1 per square mile (5.4/km^{2}). The racial makeup of the town was 97.74% White, 0.09% African American, 0.72% Native American, 0.09% Asian, 0.09% from other races, and 1.26% from two or more races. Hispanic or Latino of any race were 0.81% of the population.

There were 382 households, out of which 43.7% had children under the age of 18 living with them, 64.9% were married couples living together, 9.2% had a female householder with no husband present, and 18.6% were non-families. 10.7% of all households were made up of individuals, and 4.2% had someone living alone who was 65 years of age or older. The average household size was 2.90 and the average family size was 3.08.

In the town, the population was spread out, with 30.4% under the age of 18, 6.7% from 18 to 24, 33.7% from 25 to 44, 20.8% from 45 to 64, and 8.5% who were 65 years of age or older. The median age was 35 years. For every 100 females, there were 98.9 males. For every 100 females age 18 and over, there were 101.8 males.

The median income for a household in the town was $39,167, and the median income for a family was $36,875. Males had a median income of $27,143 versus $20,833 for females. The per capita income for the town was $14,555. About 6.4% of families and 9.1% of the population were below the poverty line, including 13.8% of those under age 18 and 4.2% of those age 65 or over.

== Communities and locations in Solon ==
- Mayberry Brook — A stream near the western town line that flows into Trout Brook at Mayberry Mills.
- Mayberry Mills — A hamlet at the western town boundary.
- Solon — The hamlet of Solon on NY Route 41.
- Trout Brook — A tributary of the Tioughnioga River. Trout Brook flows westward from the town.
