= Peck Memorial Library =

- U.S. National Register of Historic Places
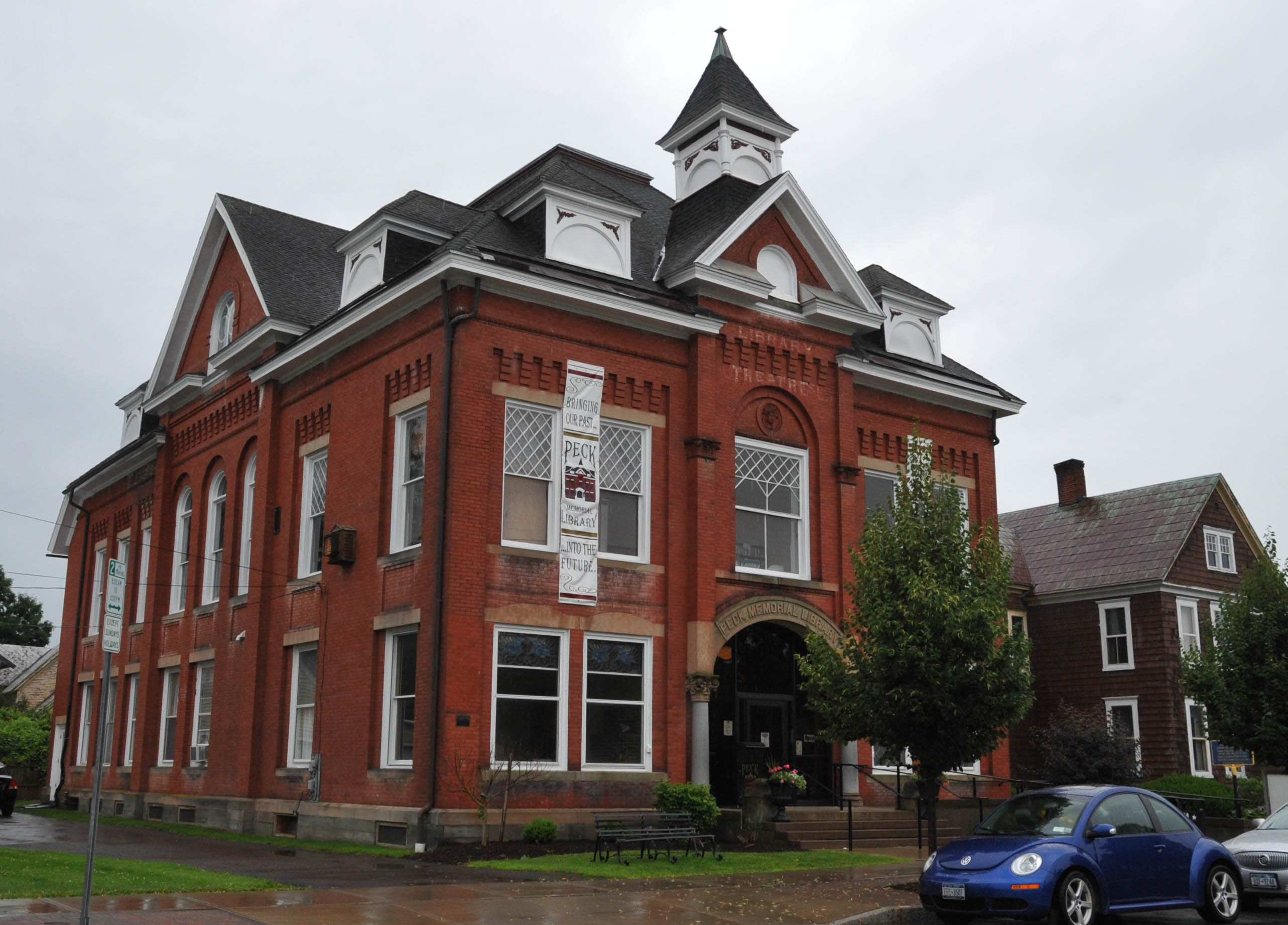

- Location within New York Location within the United States
- Location: 28 E. Main St., Marathon, New York
- Coordinates: 42°26′28″N 76°2′0″W
- Area: less than one acre
- Built: 1895
- Architect: Howe, Miles F.; Ville, Lewis G.
- Architectural style: Late Victorian
- NRHP reference No.: 92000557
- Added to NRHP: May 19, 1992

Peck Memorial Library is a historic library building located at Marathon in Cortland County, New York. It is a 2 1/2-story brick structure constructed in 1894–1895. It is eclectic in style and typical of Late Victorian architecture.

It was listed on the National Register of Historic Places in 1992.
