= Cortland Free Library =

- U.S. National Register of Historic Places
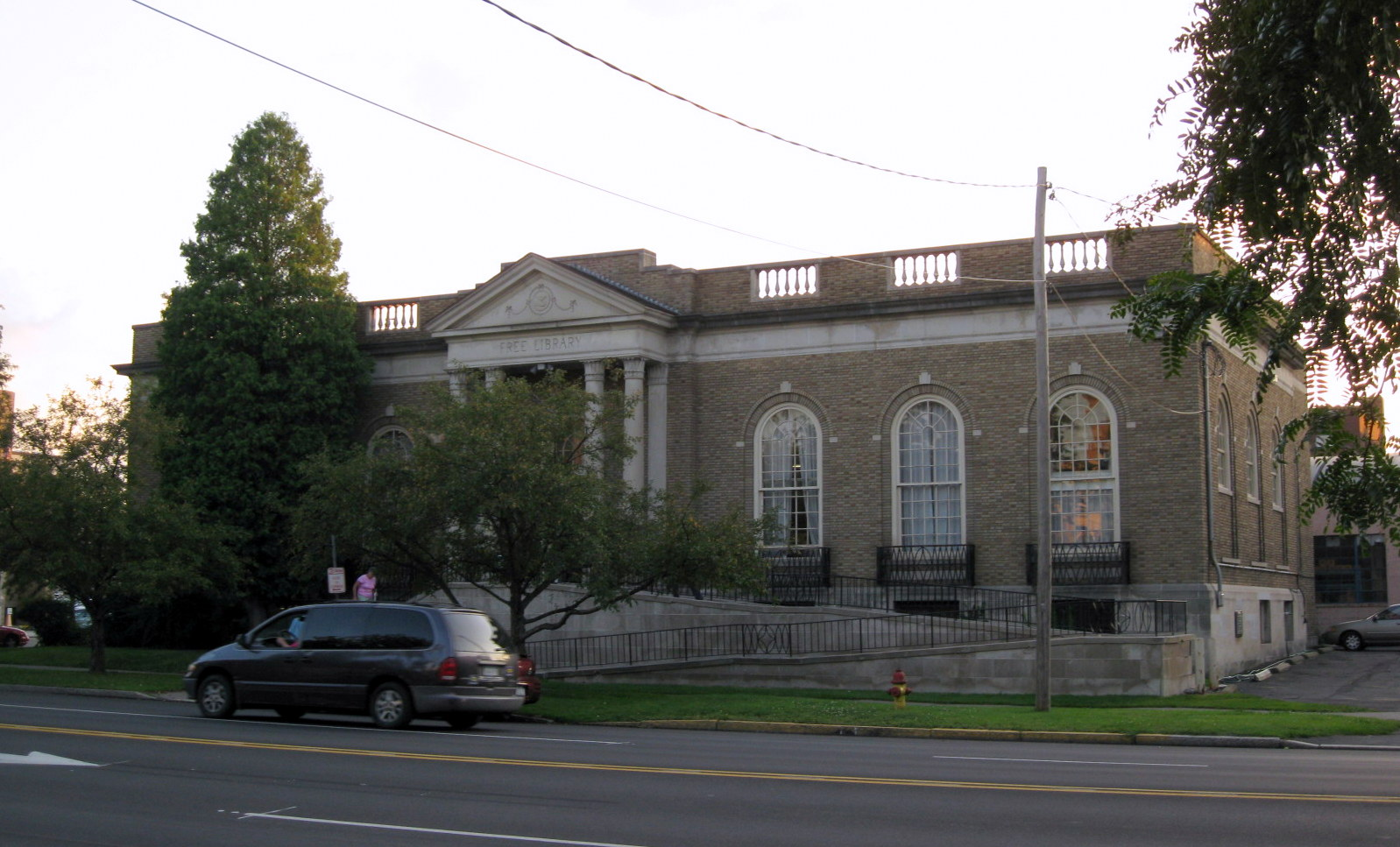
- Cortland Free Library, August 2009

- Location within New York Location within the United States
- Location: 32 Church St., Cortland, New York
- Coordinates: 42°35′59.47″N 76°10′40.57″W
- Area: less than one acre
- Built: 1928
- Architect: Clark, Carl W.
- Architectural style: Georgian Revival
- Website: http://cortlandfreelibrary.org/
- NRHP reference No.: 08000469
- Added to NRHP: May 30, 2008

Cortland Free Library is a historic library building located at Cortland in Cortland County, New York. It consists of one colossal story, seven bays wide, that stands on a high basement. It is constructed of brick in the Georgian Revival style and built in 1928. The entrance is marked by a projecting portico with four columns.

It was listed on the National Register of Historic Places in 2008.
