= Taylor Center Methodist Episcopal Church and Taylor District No. 3 School =

Historic church in New York, United States

- U.S. National Register of Historic Places
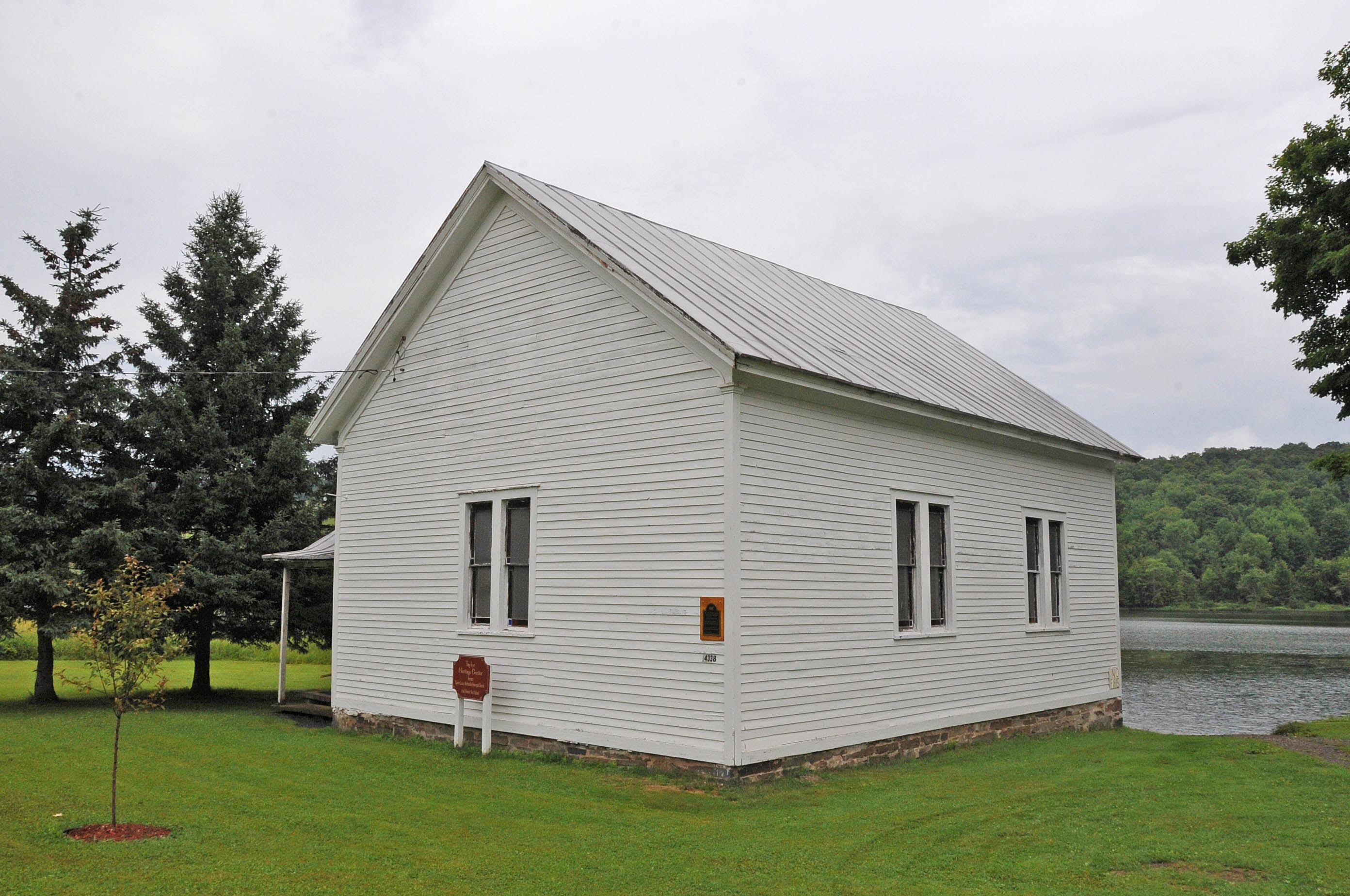

- Location within New York Location within the United States
- Location: 4332-4338 Cheningo-Solon Pond Rd., Taylor Center, New York
- Coordinates: 42°36′59″N 75°55′32″W
- Area: 0.9 acres (0.36 ha)
- NRHP reference No.: 10000513
- Added to NRHP: July 30, 2010

Taylor Center Methodist Episcopal Church and Taylor District No. 3 School is a historic Methodist Episcopal church and former one-room school located at Taylor Center in Cortland County, New York, United States. The church, also known as Second Methodist Episcopal Church of Taylor, the Solon Pond Church, and the Christian Community Church of Solon Pond, was constructed about 1870. It is a one-story, white clapboard building measuring 30 feet by 40 feet. It has a gable roof and small wing. The interior is laid out in the Akron Plan style. The school is included in the nomination to the register, but it is non-contributing.

It was added to the National Register of Historic Places in 2010.
