= Stage Coach Inn (Lapeer, New York) =

Historic inn in New York, United States

- U.S. National Register of Historic Places
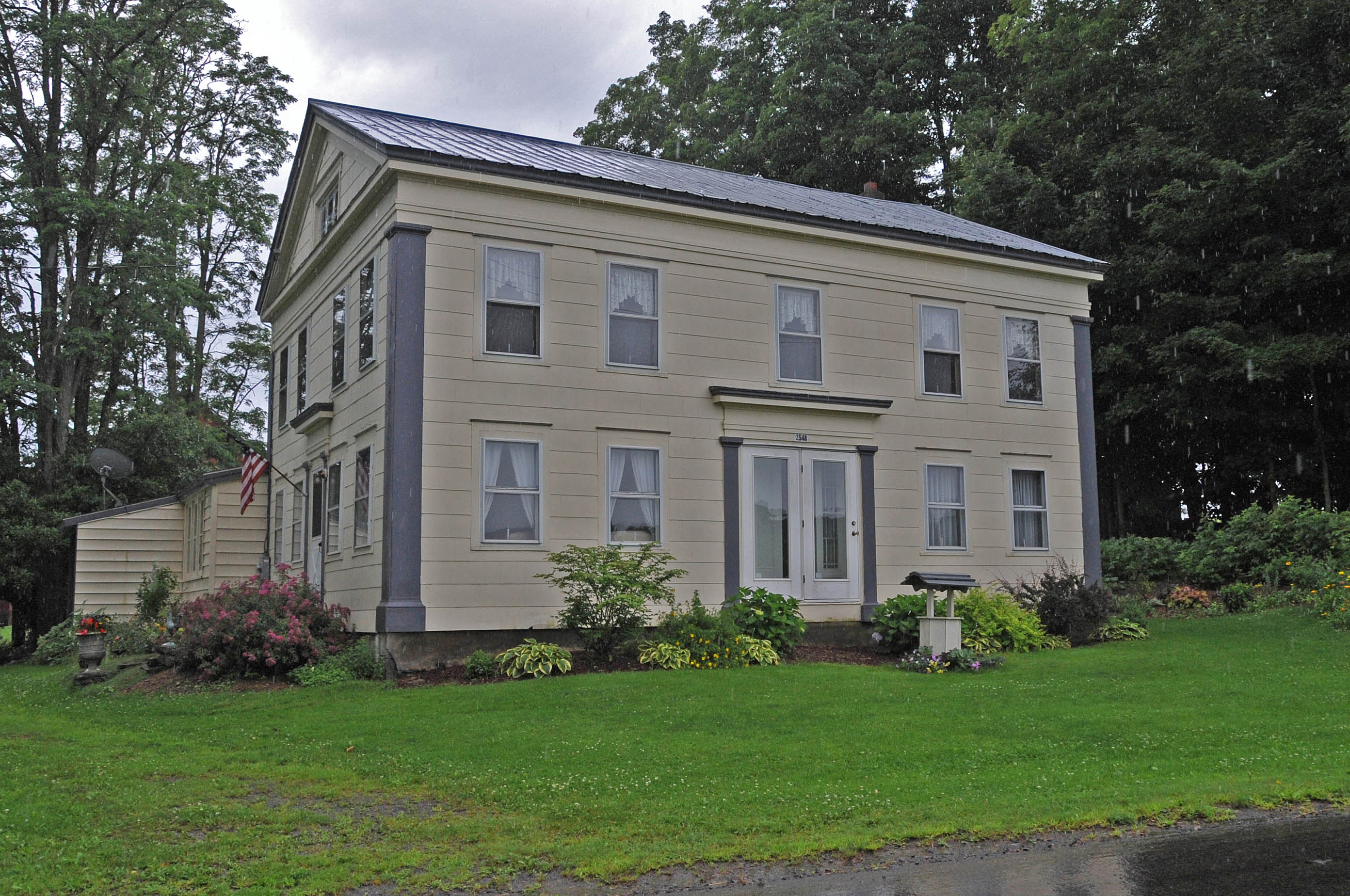

- Location within New York Location within the United States
- Location: 2548 Clarks Corners Rd., Lapeer, New York
- Coordinates: 42°26′26.92″N 76°6′3.5″W
- Area: 1.0 acre (0.40 ha)
- Built: 1830
- Architect: Royal Johnson
- Architectural style: Greek Revival
- NRHP reference No.: 09001080
- Added to NRHP: December 11, 2009

Stage Coach Inn, also known as the Royal Johnson House, is a historic inn located at Lapeer in Cortland County, New York. It was built about 1830 and is a two-story, rectangular five bay center entrance frame building. It features a full Greek Revival style entrance with pilasters, a full entablature, and two-paneled door with sidelights. It served as a home, hostelry for stage coach travelers, a post office, as well as a dance hall. The second floor dance hall remains intact. It remained in the Johnson family from the time of its construction to the early 21st century.

It was listed on the National Register of Historic Places in 2009.
