= Cortland County Poor Farm =

- U.S. National Register of Historic Places
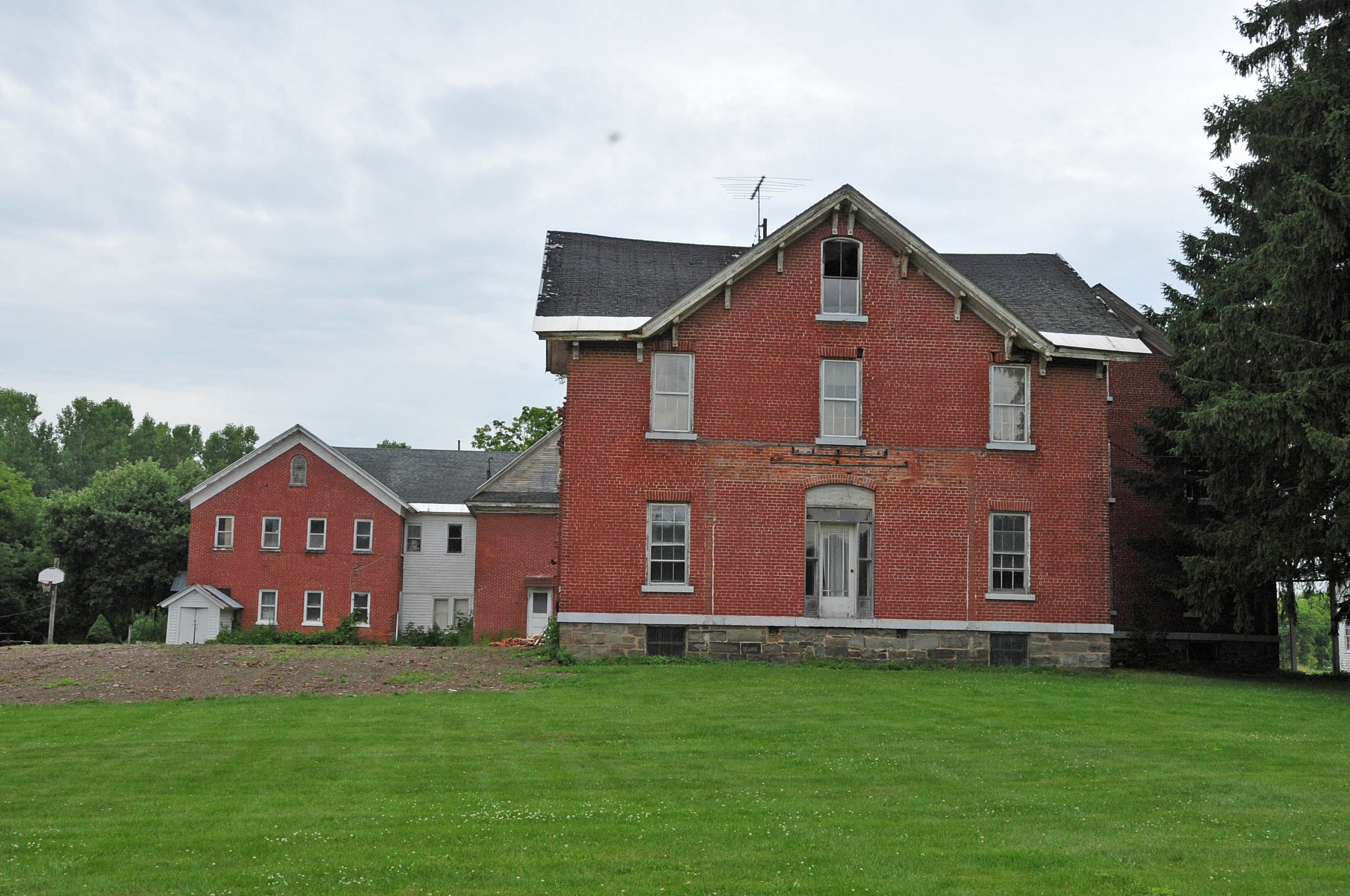

- Location within New York Location within the United States
- Nearest city: Cortland, New York
- Coordinates: 42°37′36″N 76°8′14″W
- Area: 111.8 acres (45.2 ha)
- Built: 1820
- Architect: Multiple
- NRHP reference No.: 82001115
- Added to NRHP: October 29, 1982

Cortland County Poor Farm, also known as County Farm, is a historic poor farm complex located at Cortland in Cortland County, New York. The complex consists of 13 well preserved vernacular buildings, a concrete block piggery, and several frame outbuildings sheathed in clapboard or board and batten siding. The county purchased the original farm in 1836.

It was listed on the National Register of Historic Places in 1982.
