= Union Valley Congregational Church =

Historic church in New York, United States

- U.S. National Register of Historic Places
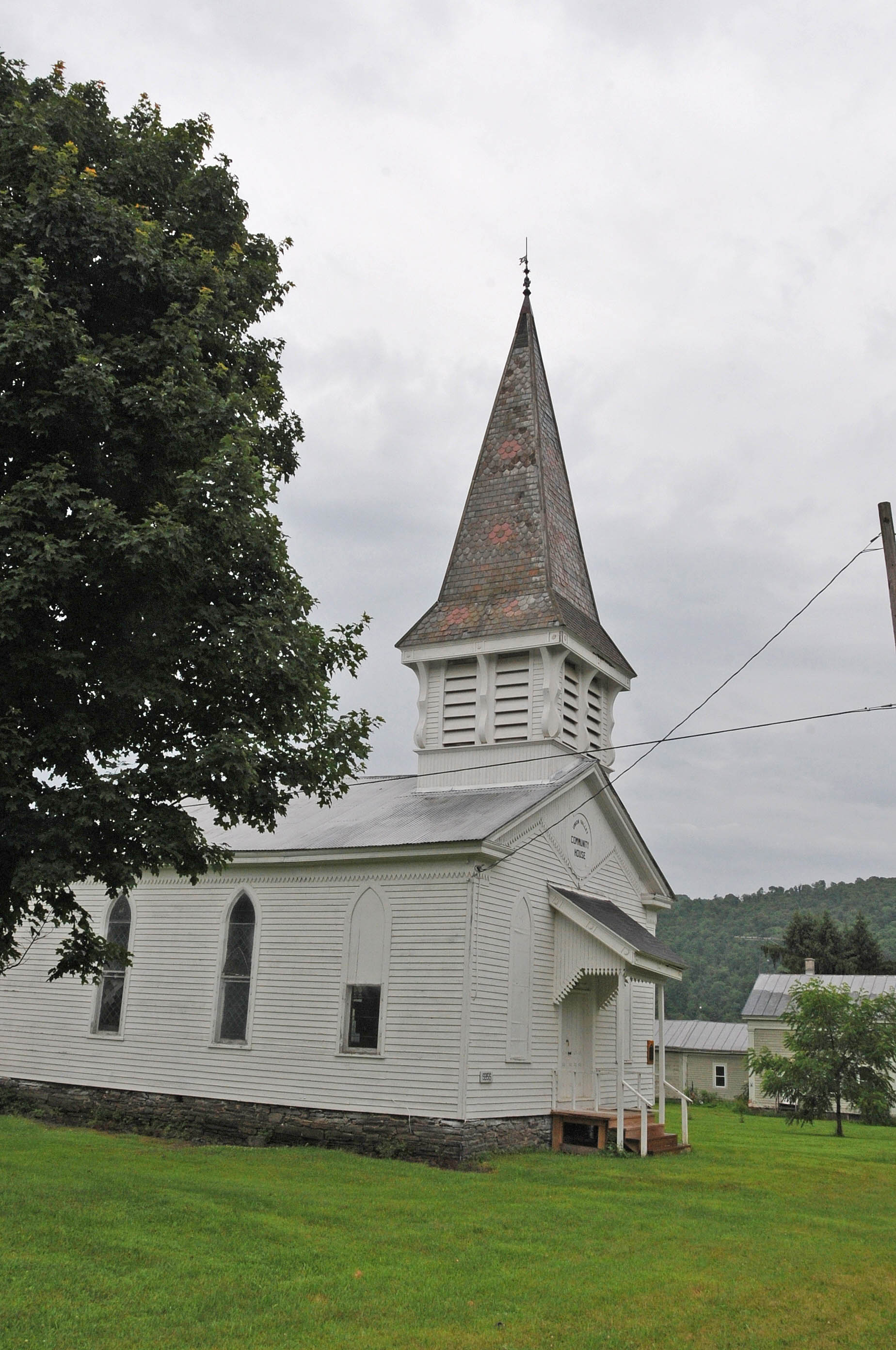

- Location within New York Location within the United States
- Location: Union Valley Cross Rd., Taylor, New York
- Coordinates: 42°38′2″N 75°53′0″W
- Area: less than one acre
- Built: ca. 1849
- Architectural style: Greek Revival, Gothic
- NRHP reference No.: 02001639
- Added to NRHP: December 31, 2002

Union Valley Congregational Church, also known as Union Valley Community House, is a historic Congregational church located at Taylor in Cortland County, New York. It was built about 1849 and is a modestly scaled, one story meetinghouse building with a mortise and tenon timber frame built on an above grade rubble stone foundation. It is rectangular in shape, three bays wide and three bays deep, in the Greek Revival style with an overlay of Late Victorian elements. It features a stout belfry that risesfrom the crest of the roof.

It was listed on the National Register of Historic Places in 2002.
