= Randall Farm (Cortland, New York) =

- U.S. National Register of Historic Places
- U.S. Historic district
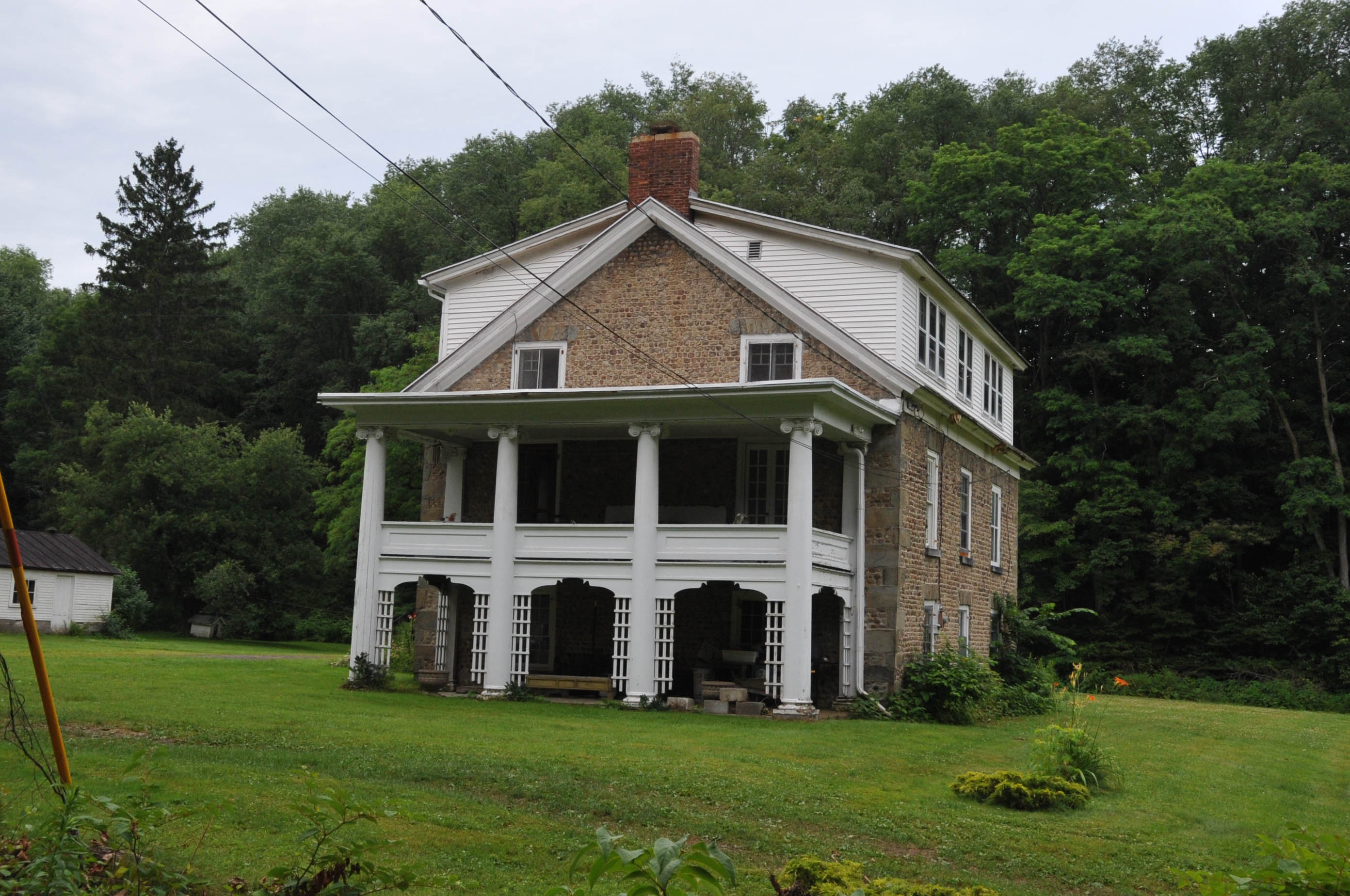

- Location within New York Location within the United States
- Location: 3713 Page Green Rd., Cortland, New York
- Coordinates: 42°35′6″N 76°10′49″W
- Area: 12.1 acres (4.9 ha)
- Built: 1825
- Architectural style: Federal
- MPS: Cobblestone Architecture of New York State MPS
- NRHP reference No.: 00000573
- Added to NRHP: June 2, 2000

Randall Farm is a historic farm and national historic district located at Cortland in Cortland County, New York. The district includes six contributing buildings and one contributing structure. It includes a cobblestone farmhouse built between 1825 and 1840 with a distinctive Colonial Revival porch added about 1920. Also on the property is a 1 1/2-story frame cottage, a dairy barn, garage, playhouse, carriage barn, smokehouse, saltbox shaped barn, small gabled barn, sugar shack, and milk house. The property also includes distinctive landscape elements.

It was listed on the National Register of Historic Places in 2000.
