= Unitarian Universalist Church (Cortland, New York) =

Historic church in New York, United States

- U.S. National Register of Historic Places
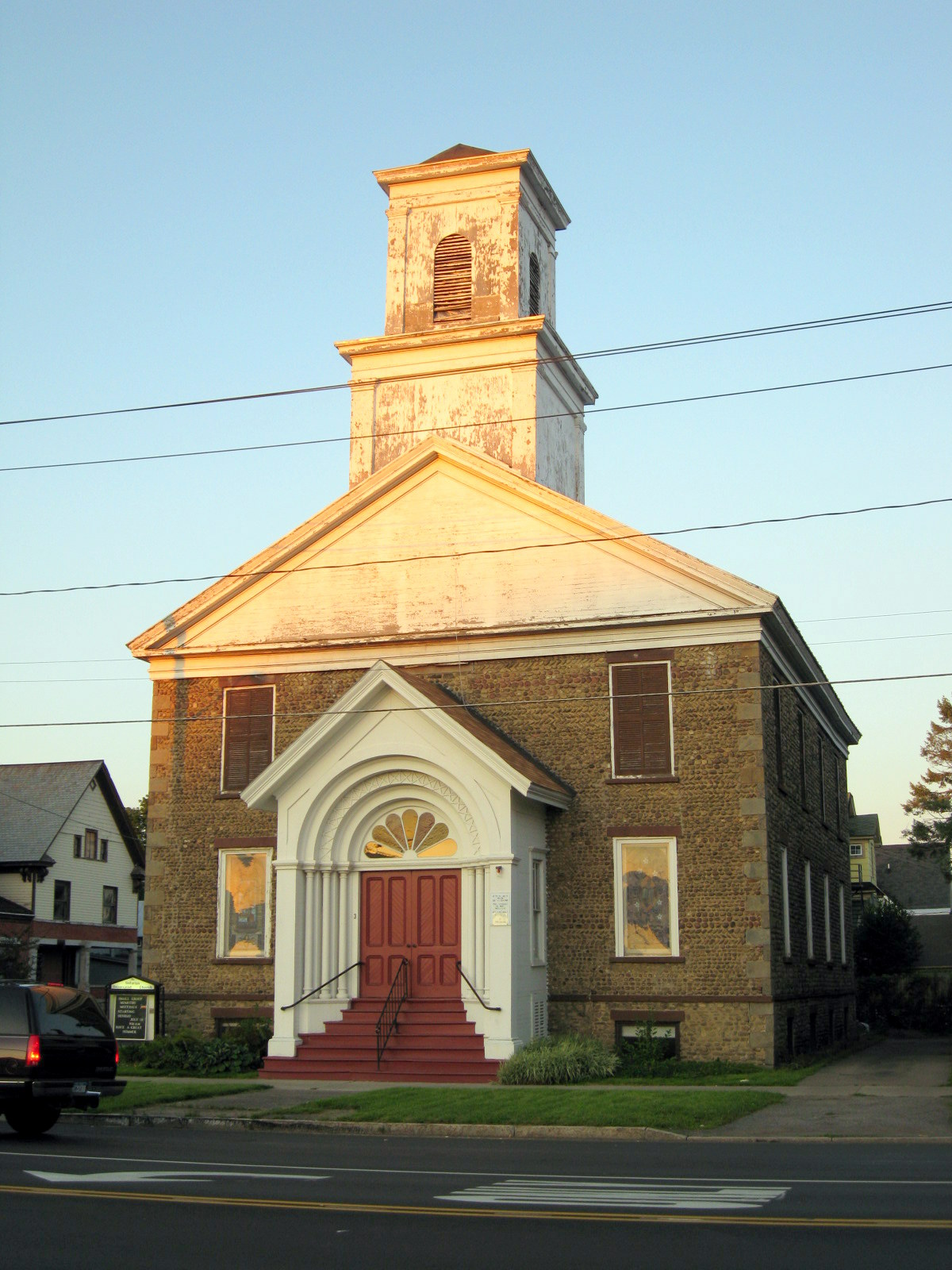
- Unitarian Universalist Church, August 2009

- Location within New York Location within the United States
- Location: 3 Church St., Cortland, New York
- Coordinates: 42°36′5″N 76°10′41″W
- Built: 1837
- Architect: Davis, Benjamin; Bliss, Horace
- Architectural style: Greek Revival, Federal
- MPS: Cobblestone Architecture of New York State MPS
- NRHP reference No.: 93000592
- Added to NRHP: July 1, 1993

The Unitarian Universalist Church of Cortland, New York, also known as "The Old Cobblestone Church," is an historic cobblestone church building located at 3 Church Street in Cortland, New York, United States. Built in 1837, the building was established as a Universalist church. Since 1961, the congregation has been a member of the Unitarian Universalist Association due to a denominational merger. The Unitarian Universalist Church of Cortland was listed on the National Register of Historic Places in 1993.

It has cobblestone walls and granite quoins. In 1895, a large arch was cut in the east cobblestone wall and a Morey and Barnes organ was set in the arch. This historic organ is one of only two such historic organs remaining. It is nationally recognized by the American Organ Historical Society for its superb sound and nearly original condition.

The building was documented by Historic American Buildings Survey photographer Jack Boucher in 1966.

It is one of only 21 surviving cobblestone religious buildings in New York State. It is also the oldest public building still in use in Cortland, NY. "The Town of Cortlandville contributed $100 toward construction of the church in return for the use of the church basement as the Town Hall. The Town retained use of the basement until the 1880s."

== Gallery ==
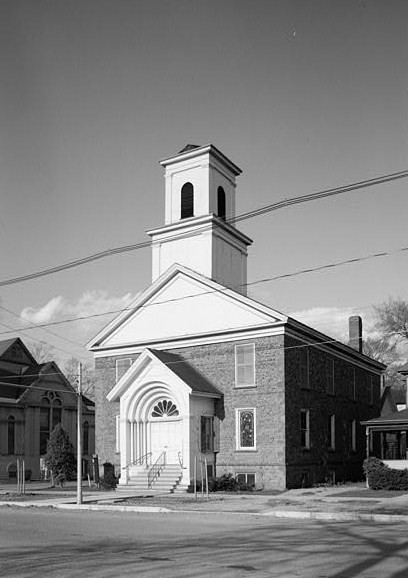
Unitarian-Universalist Church, HABS Photo, 1966
