= William J. Greenman House =

Historic house in New York, United States

- U.S. National Register of Historic Places
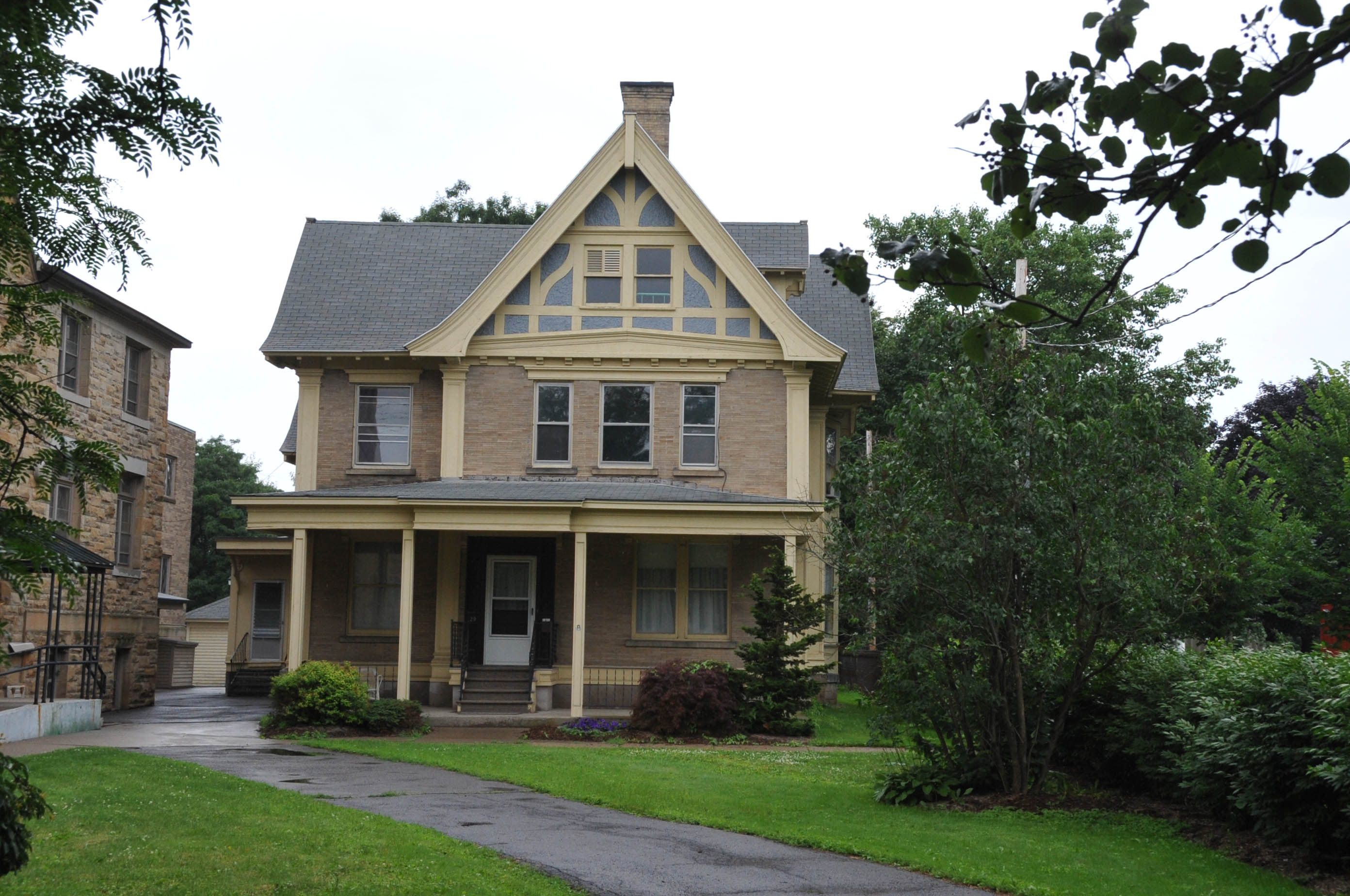

- Location within New York Location within the United States
- Location: 27 N. Church St., Cortland, New York
- Coordinates: 42°36′15″N 76°10′40″W
- Area: Less than 1 acre (0.40 ha)
- Built: 1896
- Built by: Ireland, John
- Architect: Barber, George Franklin
- Architectural style: Queen Anne
- NRHP reference No.: 11000542
- Added to NRHP: August 18, 2011

The William J. Greenman House is a historic home located at Cortland in Cortland County, New York. It was built in 1896, and based on a pattern book plan by architect George Franklin Barber. It is a 2½-story, Queen Anne-style frame dwelling. It is sheathed in clapboard and sits on a stone foundation. It features exuberant wood trim, decorative shingles and half-timbering; a wraparound porch with a circular section topped by a bell-shaped roof; and projecting bay windows. Also on the property is a contributing carriage house.

It was listed on the National Register of Historic Places in 2011.
