= Marathon (village), New York =

Marathon, New York
- Village
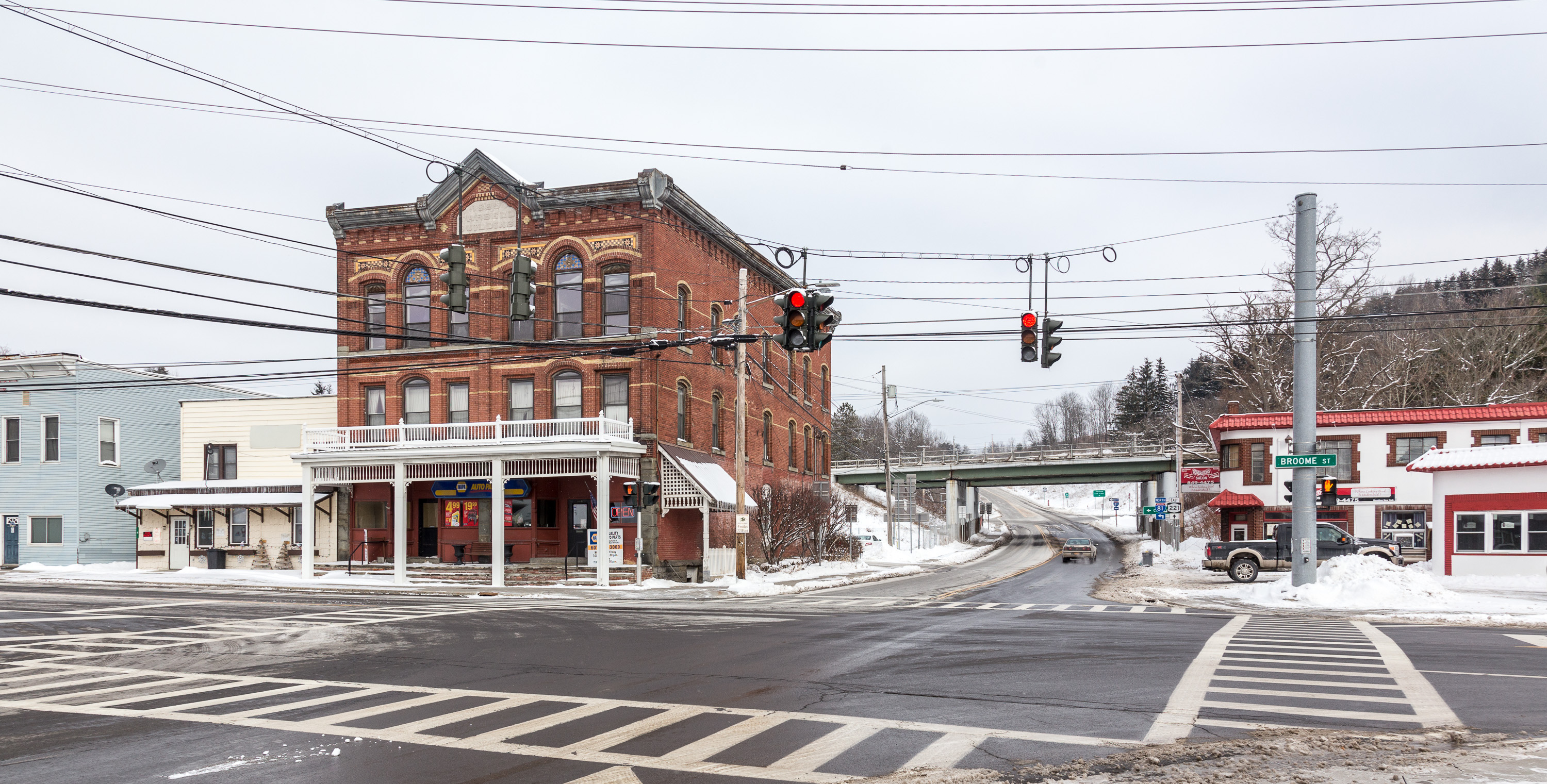
- Broome St and Main St in Marathon Village

- Location within the state of New York
- Coordinates: 42°26′37″N 76°2′13″W
- Country: United States
- State: New York
- County: Cortland
- Town: Marathon

Area
  - Total: 1.13 sq mi (2.93 km^{2})
  - Land: 1.13 sq mi (2.93 km^{2})
  - Water: 0.0039 sq mi (0.01 km^{2})
- Elevation: 1,024 ft (312 m)

Population (2020)
  - Total: 892
  - Density: 789.7/sq mi (304.89/km^{2})
- Time zone: UTC-5 (Eastern (EST))
  - Summer (DST): UTC-4 (EDT)
- ZIP code: 13803
- Area code: 607
- FIPS code: 36-45392
- GNIS feature ID: 0956488
- Website: marathonvillage.org

Marathon is a village within the town of Marathon in Cortland County, New York, United States. The population of the village was 919 at the 2010 census, out of 1,967 in the entire town.

== History ==
The village is within the former Central New York Military Tract and was incorporated in 1861.

Marathon hosts a yearly "Maple Festival" in the spring.

The Peck Memorial Library and Tarbell Building are listed on the National Register of Historic Places.

== Geography ==
Marathon village is located in the western part of the town of Marathon at 42°26′37″N 76°2′12″W (42.443633, -76.036846). It is at the junction of U.S. Route 11, Interstate 81, and New York State Route 221. Via I-81 it is 14 miles (23 km) north to Cortland, the county seat, and 26 miles (42 km) south to Binghamton.

According to the United States Census Bureau, the village has a total area of 1.1 square miles (2.9 km^{2}). Less than 0.004 square miles (0.01 km^{2}), or 0.18%, is covered with water. The Tioughnioga River, part of the Susquehanna River watershed, flows southward through the village.

== Demographics ==
Historical population
Census	Pop.	Note	%±
1870	871		—
1880	1,006		15.5%
1890	1,198		19.1%
1900	1,092		−8.8%
1910	1,079		−1.2%
1920	565		−47.6%
1930	860		52.2%
1940	955		11.0%
1950	1,057		10.7%
1960	1,079		2.1%
1970	1,053		−2.4%
1980	1,046		−0.7%
1990	1,107		5.8%
2000	1,063		−4.0%
2010	919		−13.5%
2020	892		−2.9%
U.S. Decennial Census

As of the census of 2000, there were 1,063 people, 419 households, and 286 families residing in the village. The population density was 941.4 inhabitants per square mile (363.5/km^{2}). There were 439 housing units at an average density of 388.8 per square mile (150.1/km^{2}). The racial makeup of the village was 98.97% White, 0.38% Black or African American, 0.19% Native American, 0.09% from other races, and 0.38% from two or more races. Hispanic or Latino of any race were 0.56% of the population.

There were 419 households, out of which 36.3% had children under the age of 18 living with them, 49.6% were married couples living together, 13.4% had a female householder with no husband present, and 31.7% were non-families. 26.7% of all households were made up of individuals, and 11.9% had someone living alone who was 65 years of age or older. The average household size was 2.54 and the average family size was 3.03.

In the village, the population was spread out, with 29.2% under the age of 18, 8.1% from 18 to 24, 26.7% from 25 to 44, 22.9% from 45 to 64, and 13.2% who were 65 years of age or older. The median age was 36 years. For every 100 females, there were 82.6 males. For every 100 females age 18 and over, there were 81.9 males.

The median income for a household in the village was $32,639, and the median income for a family was $42,000. Males had a median income of $31,538 versus $23,500 for females. The per capita income for the village was $16,379. About 11.4% of families and 12.4% of the population were below the poverty line, including 10.9% of those under age 18 and 17.5% of those age 65 or over.

== Education ==
=== Public libraries ===
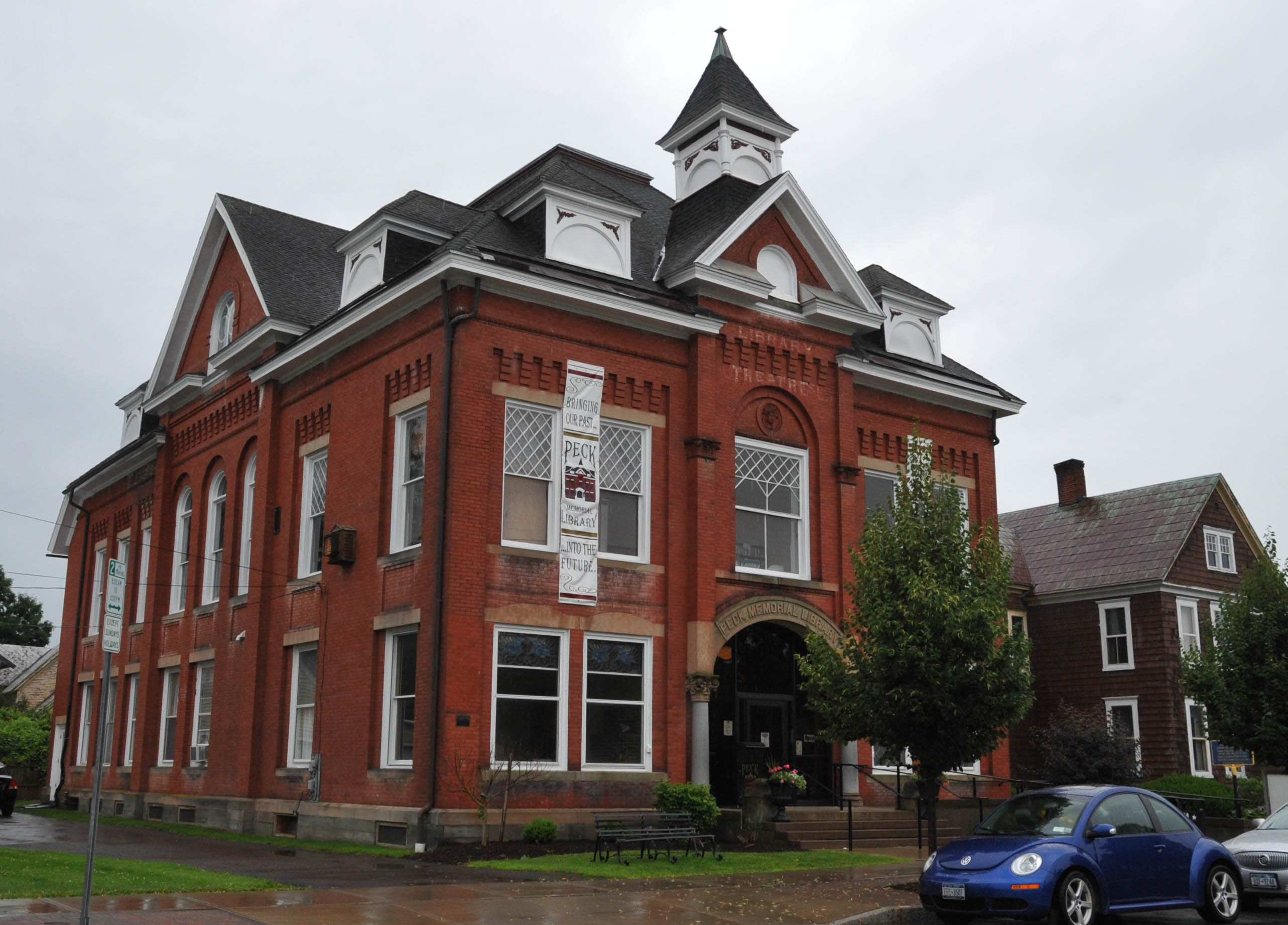
Peck Memorial Library

Peck Memorial Library is a historic library building located at Marathon in Cortland County, New York. It is a 2 1/2-story brick structure constructed in 1894–1895. It is eclectic in style and typical of Late Victorian architecture.

Willed to the people of Marathon by Mrs. Mercena Brink Peck A.D. 1891. It was listed on the National Register of Historic Places in 1992.
