= Cortland, New York =

- City
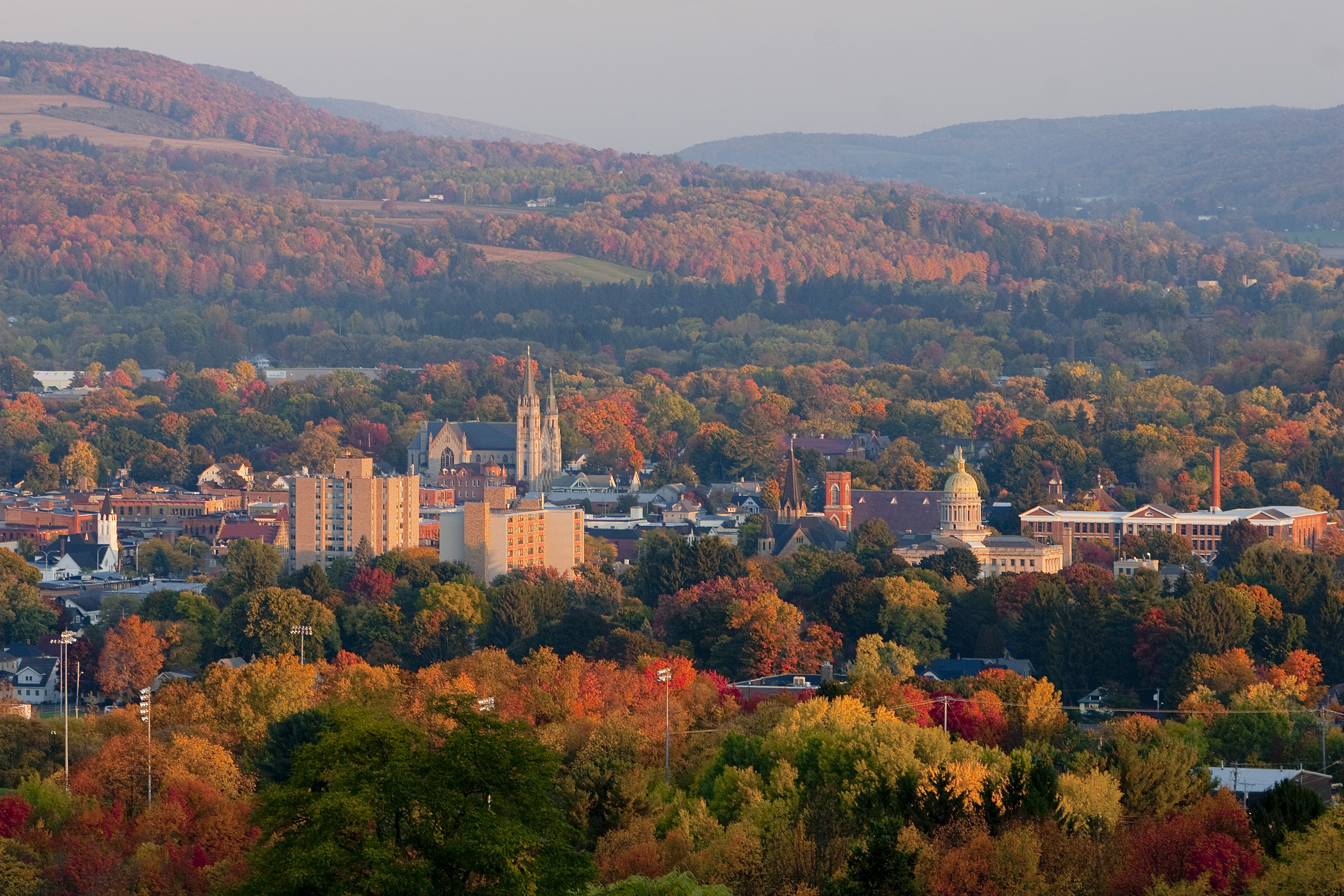
- Cortland, New York, from its Southside

- Location in Cortland County and the state of New York
- Coordinates: 42°36′2″N 76°10′53″W
- Country: United States
- State: New York
- County: Cortland
- Settled: 1791; 235 years ago
- Incorporated (village): 1853; 173 years ago
- Rechartered: 1864; 162 years ago
- Incorporated (city): 1900; 126 years ago

Government
  - Type: Mayor-Council
  - Mayor: Scott Steve (R)
  - Common Council: Members' List: • W1: Kat McCarthy (D); • W2: Katy Silliman (D); • W3: Gary Thomas (D); • W4: John Bennett (D); • W5: Bill Carpenter (D); • W6: Carlos Ferrer (D); • W7: Troy Beckwith (D); • W8: Thomas Michales (R)

Area
  - Total: 3.92 sq mi (10.14 km^{2})
  - Land: 3.90 sq mi (10.09 km^{2})
  - Water: 0.019 sq mi (0.05 km^{2})
- Elevation: 1,129 ft (344 m)

Population (2020)
  - Total: 17,556
  - Density: 4,508.5/sq mi (1,740.74/km^{2})
- Time zone: UTC-5 (Eastern (EST))
  - Summer (DST): UTC-4 (EDT)
- ZIP code: 13045
- Area code: 607
- FIPS code: 36-18388
- GNIS feature ID: 0947499
- Website: www.cortlandny.gov

Cortland is a city and the county seat of Cortland County, New York, United States. Known as the Crown City, Cortland is in New York's Southern Tier region. As of 2024, the estimated population of Cortland, New York, is 17,196, reflecting a decline of approximately 1.82% since the 2020 census, which recorded 17,515 residents.

The city of Cortland, near the county's western border, is surrounded by the town of Cortlandville.

== History ==
The city is within the former Central New York Military Tract. It is named after Pierre Van Cortlandt, the first lieutenant governor of New York.

Cortland, settled in 1791, was made a village in 1853 (rechartered in 1864), and incorporated in 1900 as New York's 41st city. When the county was formed in 1808, Cortland vied with other villages to become the county seat. Known as the "Crown City" because of its location on a plain formed by the convergence of seven valleys, Cortland is 1,130 feet (340 m) above sea level. Forty stars representing the 40 cities incorporated before Cortland circle the State of New York and Crown on the city's official seal. The seven points of the crown represent the seven valleys surrounding Cortland. The 41st star in the center of the crown illustrates Cortland as the incorporated city closest to New York's geographic center.

Cortland's leading industry in the late 19th and early 20th centuries was the Wickwire Brothers wire-drawing mill, noted for its production of wire hardware cloth for use as window screens. The extent of the Wickwires' wealth is demonstrated in the two magnificent mansions they commissioned. The Victorian Chateauesque-style home of Chester Wickwire is now operated as the 1890 House Museum & Center for Victorian Arts. Charles Wickwire's 1912 home is now owned and operated by the SUNY Cortland Alumni Association. It is open to the public and used by the Alumni Association to host college-related events and house visiting dignitaries.

Cortland was also the location of Brockway Motor Company, a pioneering truck maker. Begun in 1875 as Brockway Carriage Works, it was taken over by Mack Trucks in 1956 and survived until 1977. The city continues to host an annual show of Brockway trucks.

From 1960 to 1992, Smith Corona typewriters were manufactured in Cortland.

Cortland boasts a classic octagon house. The Cortland Rural Cemetery is styled as a garden setting and is still in operation.

In 1868, Cortland became the home of the Cortland Normal School, which gradually developed into a four-year college. With graduate programs and research capacity, it has expanded into the State University of New York at Cortland.

In 2006, Cortland's historic clock tower burned down. It was later rebuilt, with spaces in the building for both businesses and apartments.

The Cortland County Courthouse, Cortland County Poor Farm, Cortland Fire Headquarters, Cortland Free Library, First Presbyterian Church Complex, William J. Greenman House, Randall Farm, Tompkins Street Historic District, Unitarian Universalist Church, and United States Post Office are listed on the National Register of Historic Places.

== Geography ==
Cortland is in west-central Cortland County at 42°36′2″N 76°10′53″W (42.600658, −76.181284). Cortland lies between Syracuse and Binghamton; it is surrounded by the town of Cortlandville.

According to the United States Census Bureau, the city has an area of 3.92 square miles (10.14 km^{2}), of which 3.90 square miles (10.09 km^{2}) is land and 0.02 square miles (0.05 km^{2}), or 0.51%, is water.

The Tioughnioga River, a tributary of the Susquehanna River, flows southward past the city.

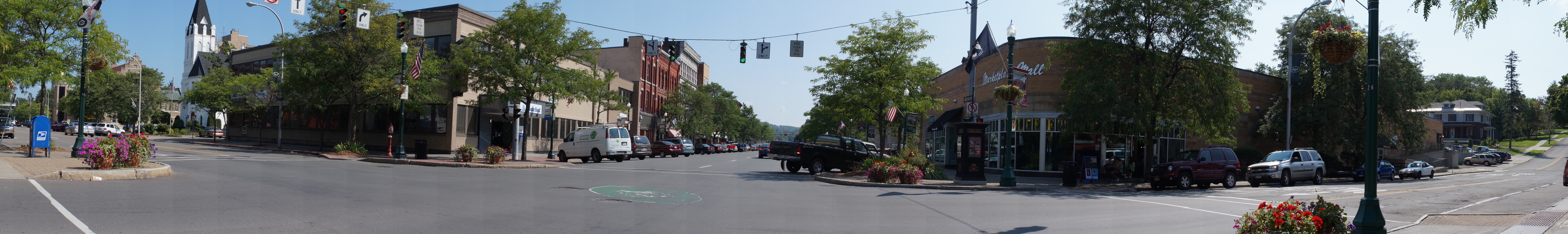
Downtown Cortland

=== Climate ===
Cortland has a humid continental climate (Koppen Dfb), with cold, snowy winters and warm summers.

Climate data for Cortland, New York
Month	Jan	Feb	Mar	Apr	May	Jun	Jul	Aug	Sep	Oct	Nov	Dec	Year
Record high °F (°C)	68 (20)	65 (18)	85 (29)	90 (32)	93 (34)	96 (36)	100 (38)	98 (37)	100 (38)	90 (32)	81 (27)	68 (20)	100 (38)
Mean daily maximum °F (°C)	30.6 (−0.8)	32.8 (0.4)	41.9 (5.5)	54.1 (12.3)	67.6 (19.8)	76.3 (24.6)	81.0 (27.2)	79.4 (26.3)	70.7 (21.5)	59.0 (15.0)	46.2 (7.9)	35.1 (1.7)	56.2 (13.5)
Mean daily minimum °F (°C)	15.2 (−9.3)	15.7 (−9.1)	24.1 (−4.4)	34.4 (1.3)	45.3 (7.4)	54.3 (12.4)	58.8 (14.9)	56.9 (13.8)	49.3 (9.6)	39.3 (4.1)	31.7 (−0.2)	21.5 (−5.8)	37.2 (2.9)
Record low °F (°C)	−25 (−32)	−26 (−32)	−13 (−25)	11 (−12)	23 (−5)	32 (0)	39 (4)	35 (2)	27 (−3)	18 (−8)	2 (−17)	−17 (−27)	−26 (−32)
Average precipitation inches (mm)	2.74 (70)	2.49 (63)	3.12 (79)	3.22 (82)	3.28 (83)	4.08 (104)	3.37 (86)	2.98 (76)	3.97 (101)	3.17 (81)	3.49 (89)	3.41 (87)	39.32 (999)
Average snowfall inches (cm)	19.7 (50)	19.2 (49)	13.2 (34)	4.0 (10)	0 (0)	0 (0)	0 (0)	0 (0)	0 (0)	.3 (0.76)	8.2 (21)	22.3 (57)	86.9 (221)
Average precipitation days (≥ 0.01 in)	17.4	14.3	14.3	13.4	12.1	11.8	10.6	10.2	11.5	12.6	15.2	16.8	160.2
Average snowy days (≥ 0.1 in)	9.1	7.0	4.5	1.7	0	0	0	0	0	.1	3.2	7.6	33.2
Source 1: NOAA (normals 1971–2000),
Source 2: The Weather Channel (extremes)

== Demographics ==
Historical population
Census	Pop.	Note	%±
1870	3,066		—
1880	4,050		32.1%
1890	8,590		112.1%
1900	9,014		4.9%
1910	11,504		27.6%
1920	13,294		15.6%
1930	15,043		13.2%
1940	15,881		5.6%
1950	18,152		14.3%
1960	19,181		5.7%
1970	19,621		2.3%
1980	20,138		2.6%
1990	19,801		−1.7%
2000	18,740		−5.4%
2010	19,204		2.5%
2020	17,556		−8.6%
U.S. Decennial Census

=== 2020 census ===
As of the 2020 census, Cortland had a population of 17,556. The median age was 32.0 years. 16.1% of residents were under the age of 18 and 15.2% of residents were 65 years of age or older. For every 100 females there were 96.0 males, and for every 100 females age 18 and over there were 93.7 males age 18 and over.

Of residents, 99.8% lived in urban areas, while 0.2% lived in rural areas.

There were 6,670 households in Cortland, of which 23.1% had children under the age of 18 living in them. Of all households, 27.9% were married-couple households, 26.3% were households with a male householder and no spouse or partner present, and 34.7% were households with a female householder and no spouse or partner present. About 40.7% of all households were made up of individuals and 14.9% had someone living alone who was 65 years of age or older.

There were 7,649 housing units, of which 12.8% were vacant. The homeowner vacancy rate was 2.2% and the rental vacancy rate was 10.1%.

Racial composition as of the 2020 census
Race	Number	Percent
White	14,546	82.9%
Black or African American	643	3.7%
American Indian and Alaska Native	47	0.3%
Asian	703	4.0%
Native Hawaiian and Other Pacific Islander	8	0.0%
Some other race	529	3.0%
Two or more races	1,080	6.2%
Hispanic or Latino (of any race)	929	5.3%

=== 2000 census ===
As of the census of 2000, there were 18,740 people, 6,922 households, and 3,454 families residing in the city. The population density was 4,778.6 inhabitants per square mile (1,845.0/km^{2}). There were 7,550 housing units at an average density of 1,925.2 per square mile (743.3/km^{2}). The racial makeup of the city was 95.72% White, 1.56% African American, 0.25% Native American, 0.57% Asian, 0.02% Pacific Islander, 0.56% from other races, and 1.33% from two or more races. Hispanic or Latino of any race were 1.72% of the population.

Of the 6,922 households, 24.8% had children under the age of 18 living with them, 34.7% were married couples living together, 11.4% had a female householder with no husband present, and 50.1% were non-families. 36.0% of all households were made up of individuals, and 13.0% had someone living alone who was 65 years of age or older. The average household size was 2.28 and the average family size was 2.95.

In the city, the population was spread out, with 18.3% under the age of 18, 28.4% from 18 to 24, 23.6% from 25 to 44, 16.8% from 45 to 64, and 12.9% who were 65 years of age or older. The median age was 28 years. For every 100 females, there were 88.4 males. For every 100 females age 18 and over, there were 84.5 males.

=== Income and poverty ===
The median income for a household in the city was $26,478, and the median income for a family was $39,167. Males had a median income of $29,857 versus $21,614 for females. The per capita income for the city was $14,267. About 13.9% of families and 24.7% of the population were below the poverty line, including 24.8% of those under age 18 and 15.2% of those age 65 or over.

=== Demographic estimates ===
As of 2015 the largest self-reported ancestry groups in Cortland, New York were:

- English - 15.6%
- Irish - 10.8%
- Italian - 9.7%
- German - 8.4%
- "American" - 5.7%
- Dutch - 2.2%
- Scottish - 2.1%
- French (except Basque) - 1.8%
- Polish - 1.8%

== Government ==
Cortland's government consists of a mayor, who is elected at large, and an eight-member city council. One member is elected from each of the eight voting wards. As of January 2022, the mayor was Mayor Scott Steve and the eight alderpersons that comprise the city's Common Council are:

- Brian Tobin, First Ward
- Kathryn Silliman, Second Ward
- Mary Clare Pennello, Third Ward
- Pat Lane, Fourth Ward
- Tom Conlon, Fifth Ward
- Bill Carpenter, Sixth Ward
- Troy Beckwith, Seventh Ward
- Thomas Michales, Eighth Ward

The City Clerk is Andy Jewett. The City Corporation Counsel is Randall Lewis.

== Transportation ==
=== Roads and highways ===
Interstate 81, U.S. Route 11, and New York State Route 281 are north-south highways servicing the city. New York State Route 13 and New York State Route 41 also serve the city. Via I-81 it is 40 miles (64 km) north to Syracuse and 40 miles (64 km) south to Binghamton. NY-13 leads southwest 18 miles (29 km) to Ithaca.

=== Bus ===
Local public transportation by bus is provided by Centro, which replaced Cortland Transit on March 31, 2025. Greyhound and Trailways of New York provide the city with intercity bus service with connections to Syracuse, Binghamton, and points beyond. OurBus connects Cortland to Binghamton, New York City, and other destinations. The closest Amtrak train station is in Syracuse.

=== Air ===
Air service is provided by Cortland County Airport located west of the city. The nearest commercial airport is Ithaca Tompkins International Airport.

== Sports ==
In 2009, the New York Jets' training camp was moved from Hofstra University in Hempstead to the SUNY Cortland campus. The camp drew in 34,000 visitors and brought nearly $4.26 million to the local economy. In 2010, the Jets signed a three-year contract with SUNY Cortland. In 2015, they moved back to their own facility in Florham Park, New Jersey.

== Notable people ==
- Carl Carmer, author
- Charles Henry De Groat, Union Army brigadier general
- William Dillon, composer, lyricist, and vaudevillian
- Ronnie James Dio, former frontman for Rainbow and Black Sabbath; street in Cortland is named for him (Dio Way)
- Nancy Duffy, Syracuse news personality and founder of the Syracuse St. Patrick's Day Parade
- Katharine May Edwards, Wellesley College professor and classics scholar
- Col. Arnald Gabriel, Commander and Conductor of US Air Force Band, US Air Force Symphony Orchestra, and Singing Sergeants.
- Milo Goodrich, former US congressman.
- Charles W. Goodyear, businessman and railroad owner.
- Leidy Klotz, retired soccer player; professor, author.
- Jim Mahady, former Baseball second baseman for the New York Giants.
- Dennis Mepham, retired soccer player.
- Nathan Lewis Miller, former governor of New York.
- Gideon C. Moody, former senator of South Dakota.
- Mark Nauseef, musician.
- Alton B. Parker, Democratic candidate for president in 1904.
- Sime Silverman, publisher.
- Eric Soderholm, former professional baseball player.
- Elmer Ambrose Sperry, inventor of gyroscopic compass who held over 400 patents; the USS Sperry (AS-12) is named after him.
- Aljamain Sterling, UFC bantamweight champion, MMA fighter.
- Joel Eric Suben, composer and conductor.
- Raymond Gram Swing, journalist.
- Samuel Ringgold Ward, African-American who escaped enslavement to become an abolitionist, newspaper editor and Congregational minister.
- Spiegle Willcox, jazz trombone player, composer, and singer.
- Gary Wood, NFL quarterback.

== See also ==
- Cortland City School District
- Cortland County, New York
- Cortland station
- Cortland Standard
- Cortlandville, New York
