= Green Lake =

Green Lake may refer to:

== Canada ==
- Green Lake (Cariboo), British Columbia
- Green Lake (Whistler), British Columbia
- Green Lake (Nova Scotia), Halifax Regional Municipality
- Green Lake (Ontario), Renfrew County
- Astrolabe Lake, formerly Green Lake, Whitewater Region, Renfrew County, Ontario
- Green Lake, Saskatchewan, village in Saskatchewan
- Green Lake (Saskatchewan), lake in Saskatchewan

== New Zealand ==
- Green Lake (Mayor Island) (Lake Aroarotamahine), a crater lake on Mayor Island in the Bay of Plenty
- Green Lake (Raoul Island), crater lake in the Kermadec Islands
- Green Lake (Rotomahana), close to the shore of Lake Rotomahana in the Bay of Plenty Region
- Green Lake (Southland), in the Hunter Mountains
- Lake Rotokākahi, also known as Green Lake, near Rotorua in the Bay of Plenty Region

== United States ==
Alphabetical by state

- Green Lake (Alaska), south of Sitka
- Green Lake (Bradley County, Arkansas), a lake in Bradley County, Arkansas
- Green Lake (Hawaii), a former lake on the island of Hawaii
- Green Lake (Maine), Hancock County
- Green Lake, Allegan County, Michigan
- Green Lake (Grand Traverse County, Michigan)
- Green Lake (Washtenaw County, Michigan)
- Green Lake Township, Michigan, Grand Traverse County
- Green Lake (Chisago City, Minnesota)
- Green Lake (Isanti County, Minnesota)
- Green Lake (Kandiyohi County, Minnesota)
- Green Lake Township, Kandiyohi County, Minnesota
- Green Lake (Glacier County, Montana)
- Green Lake, a lake in Granite County, Montana
- Green Lake (New York), Onondaga County
- Green Lake (Cortland County, New York)
- Green Lake (Fulton County, New York)
- Green Lake (Herkimer County, New York)
- Green Lakes State Park, Onondaga County, New York
- Green Lake (South Dakota), Lake County
- Green Lake (Texas), Calhoun County
- Green Lake (North Cascades National Park), Washington
- Green Lake (Seattle), a lake and park in north central Seattle, Washington
  - Green Lake, Seattle, a neighborhood surrounding the lake
- Green Lake County, Wisconsin
  - Green Lake, Wisconsin, a city in Green Lake County
  - Green Lake (town), Wisconsin, a town in Green Lake County
  - Green Lake (Wisconsin), a lake in Green Lake County

== Elsewhere ==
- Green Lake (Kunming), Yunnan Province, China
- Green Lake (Ross Island), Antarctica
- Green Lake (Sikkim), a lake near Lachen, Sikkim, India

== Other uses ==
- Camp Green Lake, a fictional place from the book Holes

== See also ==
- Grünsee (disambiguation), (German: green lake)
- Grüner See (disambiguation)
- Lac Vert (disambiguation) (French: green lake)
- Lago Verde (disambiguation) (Italian and Spanish: green lake)
- Laguna Verde (disambiguation)
