= Grünsee =

Grünsee (literally "Green Lake") may refer to:

- Grünsee (Berchtesgadener Land), in Bavaria, Germany
- Grünsee (Pflersch), in South Tyrol, Italy
- Grünsee (Zermatt), in Valais, Switzerland

== See also ==
- Grüner See (disambiguation)
- Green Lake (disambiguation)
