= Lago Verde =

Lago Verde may refer to:

- Lago Verde, Chile, a commune in Chile
- Lago Verde, Maranhão, a town in the Brazilian state of Maranhão
- Lago Verde (Queyras), a lake in Italy
- Grünsee (Pflersch) (Italian: Lago Verde), in the Pflersch Valley in the Stubai Alps, Italy
- Lago Verde, an underground lake within the Frasassi Caves, Italy
- Lago Verde (Bosencheve), a lake in Bosencheve National Park, Mexico

== See also ==
- Laguna Verde (disambiguation)
- Green Lake (disambiguation)
