= Lac Vert =

Lac Vert or similar terms may refer to various lakes:

- Vert Lake (Hébertville), Quebec, Canada
- Lake Vert (Val-d'Illiez), Valais, Switzerland

== France ==
- Lac Vert (Passy), Haute-Savoie
- Lac Vert (Lesponne), Hautes-Pyrénées
- Lac Vert (Lot)
- Lac Vert (Vosges), Haut-Rhin

== See also ==
- Green Lake (disambiguation)
