= Stubensee =

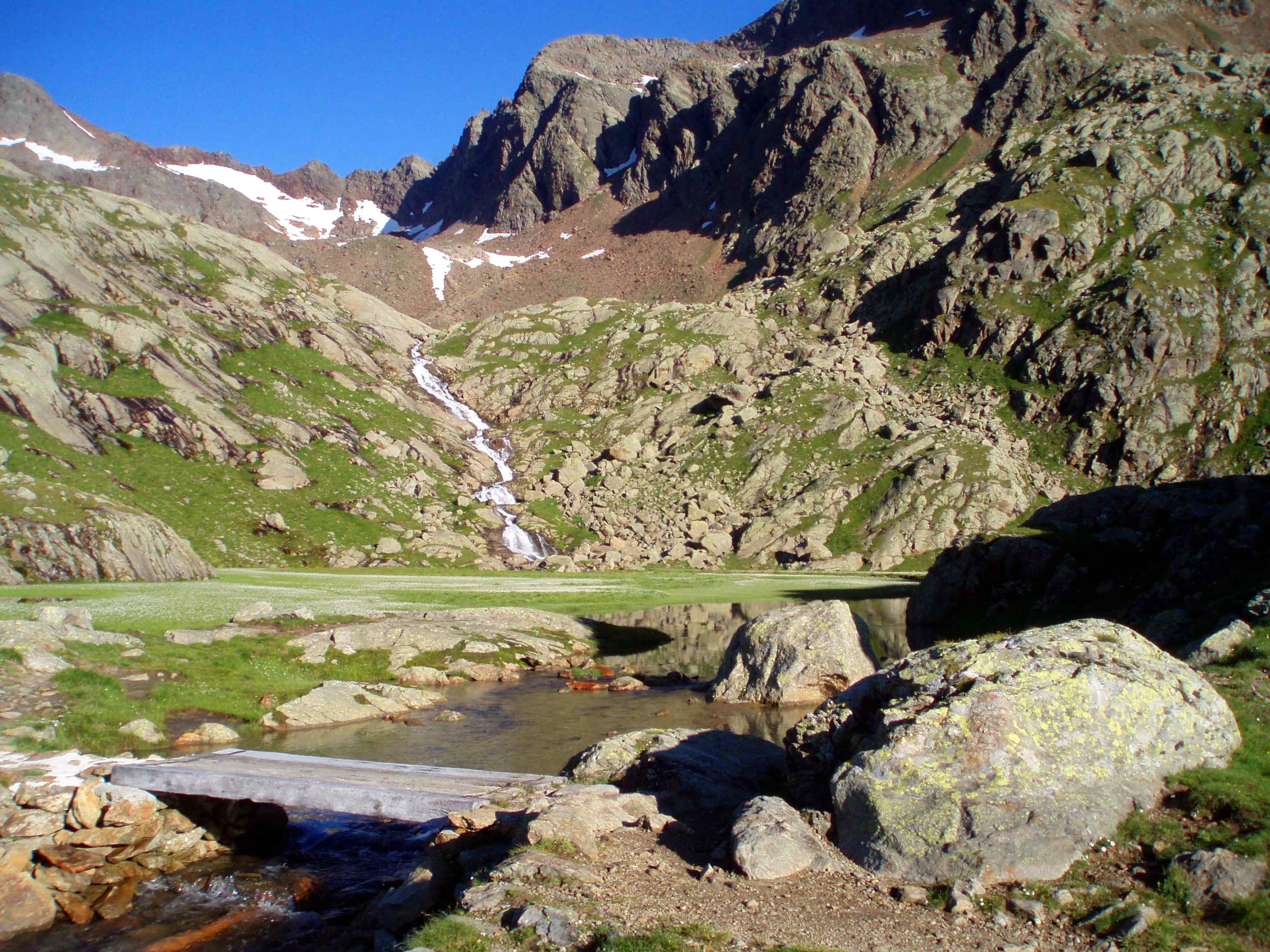
- Stubensee Lake

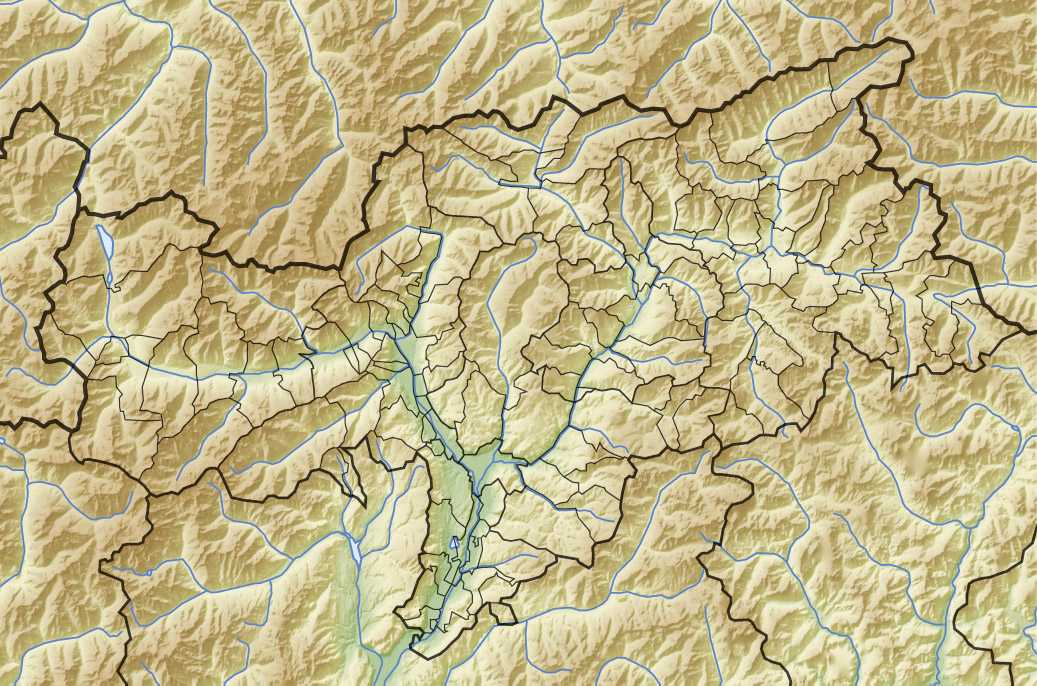
- Location within South Tyrol
- Location: Pflersch Valley, South Tyrol (Italy)
- Coordinates: 46°58′29″N 11°17′06″E
- Type: Mountain lake
- Primary inflows: only forward lake: Hochalmbach
- Primary outflows: only forward lake: Hochalmbach
- Basin countries: Italy
- Surface area: back lake: 3.67 ha (9.1 acres) / forward lake: 6.28 ha (15.5 acres)
- Average depth: both approx. 3 m (9.8 ft)
- Water volume: back lake: 110,153 m^{3} (89.302 acre⋅ft) / forward lake: 188,496 m^{3} (152.816 acre⋅ft)
- Surface elevation: 2,423 m (7,949 ft)

The back and forward lakes Stubensee (lit. Lake Stuben in German; Italian: Lago della Stua) are located 2,423 m above sea level in the back part of the Pflersch valley, which is a left side valley of the Eisacktal. Similar to the Grünsee, one has to go by car until Ochsenalm (an alpine pasture) and then travel northwards high up route 6 until the lakes are reached after about four kilometers. At the forward lake, there is a snack station called Magdeburger Hütte (German for Magdeburg alpine refuge), which is named after the city in Germany.

Both lakes have a very good water quality (A grade). As typical mountain lakes, the water remains refreshingly chilly even on hot summer days at max. 12 °C. While the back lake is only supplied by rain or melting snow, the forward one is supplied and drained by the Hochtalbach (A grade quality / rapid). The creek has a length of about 1.65 kilometers and belongs to the source rivers of the Fernerbach. Both merge near the Ochsenalm. Both lakes give also a protected, untouched living space to trouts and carps.
