= Preble, New York =

- Town
- Location within Cortland County and New York

- Location in the United States Preble (New York)
- Coordinates: 42°44′52″N 76°8′19″W
- Country: United States
- State: New York
- County: Cortland

Government
  - Type: Town Council
  - Town Supervisor: James J. Doring (R)
  - Town Council: Members' List: • Thomas E. Fox (R); • Peter D. Knapp (R); • David R. Morse (D, R); • Debra Brock ()

Area
  - Total: 27.56 sq mi (71.38 km^{2})
  - Land: 26.85 sq mi (69.53 km^{2})
  - Water: 0.71 sq mi (1.85 km^{2})
- Elevation: 1,180 ft (360 m)

Population (2010)
  - Total: 1,393
  - Estimate (2016): 1,327
  - Density: 49.4/sq mi (19.09/km^{2})
- Time zone: UTC-5 (Eastern (EST))
  - Summer (DST): UTC-4 (EDT)
- ZIP Codes: 13141 (Preble); 13077 (Homer); 13087 (Little York); 13045 (Cortland); 13159 (Tully)
- Area code: 607
- FIPS code: 36-023-59773
- GNIS feature ID: 0979397
- Website: preble-ny.org

Preble is a town in Cortland County, New York, United States. The population was 1,357 at the 2020 census, down from 1,393 at the 2010 census. The town is named after Commodore Edward Preble, a naval hero.

Preble is on the northern border of Cortland County and is north of the city of Cortland.

== History ==
Preble is within the former Central New York Military Tract. The land was first settled around 1796.

The town of Preble was organized in 1808, the year Cortland County was formed, from the town of Tully (now in Onondaga County). Preble was one of the original towns of the county when it was formed. The town was reduced in size by the later formation of the town of Scott.

In 1865, the town's population was 1,267.

The First Presbyterian Church and Little York Pavilion are listed on the National Register of Historic Places.

== Geography ==
According to the United States Census Bureau, the town of Preble has a total area of 27.6 square miles (71.4 km^{2}), of which 26.8 square miles (69.5 km^{2}) is land and 0.73 square miles (1.9 km^{2}), or 2.59%, is water.

Interstate 81, U.S. Route 11, and New York State Route 281 extend north–south through the town. The West Branch of the Tioughnioga River flows southward through the town past the previously mentioned highways. Via this river, most of the town is part of the Susquehanna River watershed. The northwestern corner of the town, however, drains northwest via Bennett Hollow to Otisco Lake, one of the Finger Lakes and part of the Lake Ontario watershed.

The northern town line is the border of Onondaga County (Tully).

== Demographics ==
Historical population
Census	Pop.	Note	%±
1820	1,257		—
1830	1,435		14.2%
1840	1,325		−7.7%
1850	1,219		−8.0%
1860	1,274		4.5%
1870	1,150		−9.7%
1880	1,138		−1.0%
1890	885		−22.2%
1900	857		−3.2%
1910	757		−11.7%
1920	678		−10.4%
1930	642		−5.3%
1940	729		13.6%
1950	808		10.8%
1960	991		22.6%
1970	1,601		61.6%
1980	1,637		2.2%
1990	1,577		−3.7%
2000	1,582		0.3%
2010	1,393		−11.9%
2016 (est.)	1,327		−4.7%
U.S. Decennial Census

As of the census of 2000, there were 1,582 people, 615 households, and 437 families residing in the town. The population density was 58.7 inhabitants per square mile (22.7/km^{2}). There were 703 housing units at an average density of 26.1 per square mile (10.1/km^{2}). The racial makeup of the town was 97.85% White, 0.70% African American, 0.70% Native American, 0.06% Asian, 0.06% Pacific Islander, 0.06% from other races, and 0.57% from two or more races. Hispanic or Latino of any race were 0.44% of the population.

There were 615 households, out of which 35.0% had children under the age of 18 living with them, 54.6% were married couples living together, 10.7% had a female householder with no husband present, and 28.8% were non-families. 22.0% of all households were made up of individuals, and 7.8% had someone living alone who was 65 years of age or older. The average household size was 2.57 and the average family size was 2.99.

In the town, the population was spread out, with 28.3% under the age of 18, 6.5% from 18 to 24, 27.8% from 25 to 44, 27.6% from 45 to 64, and 9.8% who were 65 years of age or older. The median age was 37 years. For every 100 females, there were 105.5 males. For every 100 females age 18 and over, there were 100.2 males.

The median income for a household in the town was $41,908, and the median income for a family was $45,789. Males had a median income of $33,333 versus $25,109 for females. The per capita income for the town was $18,983. About 5.2% of families and 7.7% of the population were below the poverty line, including 7.0% of those under age 18 and 7.0% of those age 65 or over.

== Communities and locations in Preble ==
- Baltimore – A hamlet east of Preble village, located on US-11.
- Cummings Crossing – A hamlet on Route 11 by the northern town line.
- Goodale Lake – A small lake by the southern town line.
- Preble – The hamlet of Preble, located west of Interstate 81.
- Slab City – A hamlet on US-11, southeast of Preble village.
- Song Lake – A small lake by the north town and county lines, southwest of Tully Lake.
- Song Mountain – A small mountain located along the northern town and county lines.
- Tully Lake – A lake at the northern town line and partly in the town.
- Upper Little York Lake – A small lake west of Goodale Lake.
