= Vert =

Vert or Verts is the French word for the color green. It may also refer to:

- Vert (tincture), the colour green in heraldry
- Vert (music producer) (born 1972)
- Vert (sport), a competition on a vert ramp
- Vert skating, skating sports discipline
- The Greens (France) (Les Verts), a political party
- &vert;, the HTML character entity reference for the vertical bar symbol

== Places ==
- Vert (river), in southern France
- Vert, Landes, French commune
- Vert, Yvelines, French commune

== See also ==
- Lac Vert (disambiguation), the name of various lakes
