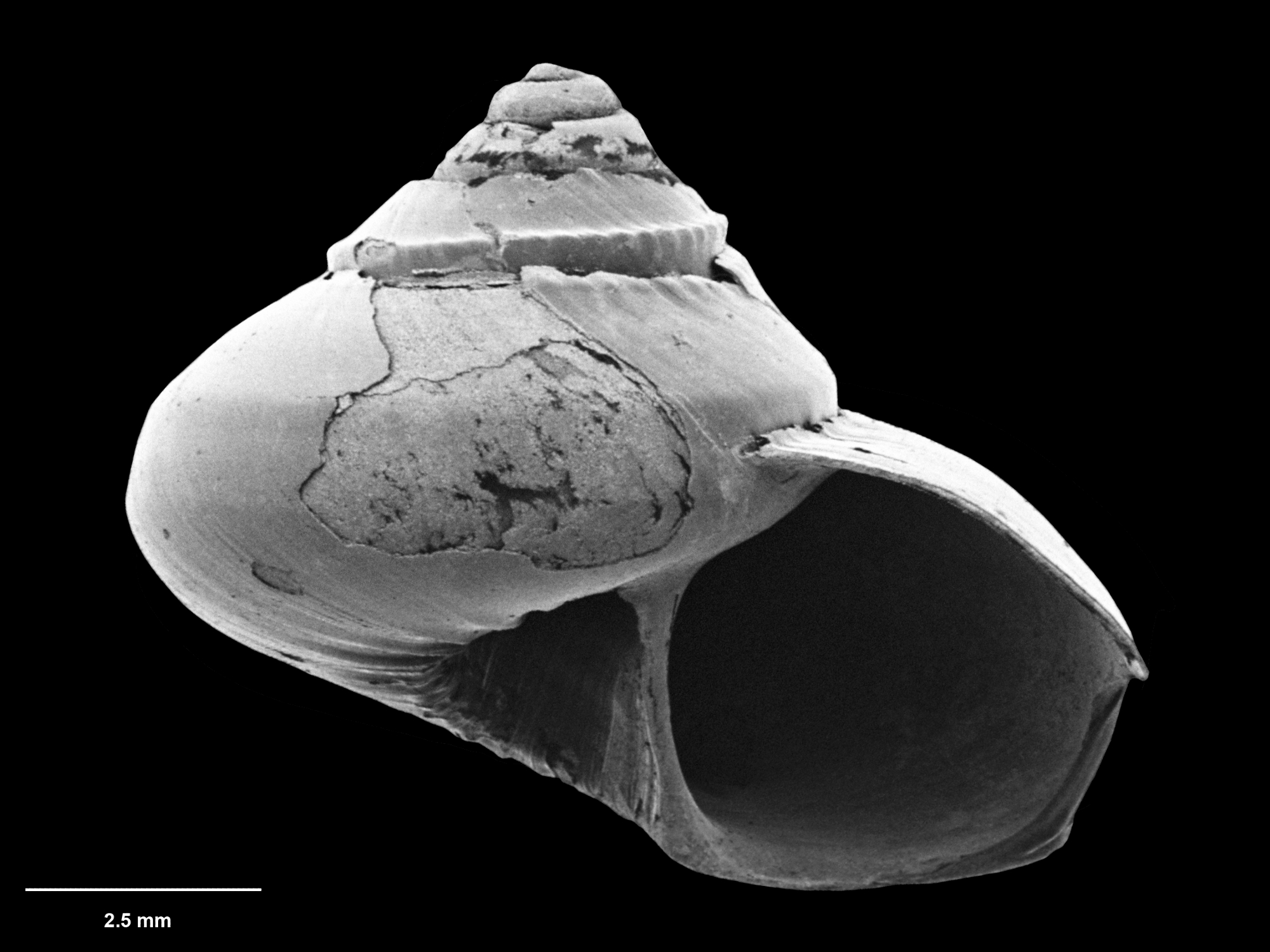
- Type specimen from the collections of Te Papa

Scientific classification
- Kingdom: Animalia
- Phylum: Mollusca
- Class: Gastropoda
- Subclass: Vetigastropoda
- Order: Trochida
- Superfamily: Trochoidea
- Family: Solariellidae
- Genus: Elaphriella
- Species: E. diplax

Binomial name
- Elaphriella diplax Marshall, 1999

Synonyms
- Archiminolia diplax (Marshall, 1999)

= Elaphriella diplax =

Species of gastropod

Elaphriella diplax is a species of sea snail, a marine gastropod mollusk in the family Solariellidae. It is endemic to New Zealand.

== Description ==
The diameter of the shell is up to 11 mm in width. The shell is white in appearance, is moderately thick, and is wider than it is high. This species is regarded as being distinctive in appearance as it has

suprasutural angulation on the spire whorls, rounded, axially elongate nodules on both the submedian and subsutural angulation, and rounded axial pleats on the inner base.

== Distribution ==
This marine species is endemic to New Zealand and occurs off Mayor Island at depths between 753 m and 826 m.
