= Grüner See =

Grüner See (literally "Green Lake") may refer to:

- Grüner See (Styria), near Tragöß, Austria
- Grüner See (Lower Saxony)
- Grüner See (Hundelshausen)

== See also ==
- Grünsee (disambiguation)
- Green Lake (disambiguation)
