= Laguna Verde =

Laguna Verde, the Spanish-language form of green lagoon or green lake, may refer to:

== Bolivia ==
- Laguna Verde (Bolivia), a salt lake in Potosi Department
- Laguna Verde (Beni), a lake in Beni Department
- Laguna Verde (Comarapa), a lake in Comarapa

== Chile ==
- Laguna Verde, Chile, a town
- Laguna Verde (lake of Chile), in the Andes
- Laguna Verde (volcano), in the Salar de Atacama

== Other places ==
- Laguna Verde (Hong Kong), a residential complex in Kowloon, Hong Kong, China
- Laguna Verde Nuclear Power Station, in Alto Lucero, Veracruz, Mexico

== See also ==
- Green Lake (disambiguation)
- Lago Verde (disambiguation)
