= Tully, New York =

- Town
- Location in Onondaga County and the state of New York.
- Coordinates: 42°47′51″N 76°6′23″W
- Country: United States
- State: New York
- County: Onondaga
- Area settled: 1795
- Town created: 1803

Government
  - Type: Town Council
  - Town Supervisor: John C. Masters (R)
  - Town Council: Members' List: • John R. Snavlin (R); • Catherine Goodwin (R); • Chris B. Chapman (R); • Frank Speziale, Jr. (R)

Area
  - Total: 26.28 sq mi (68.06 km^{2})
  - Land: 25.75 sq mi (66.70 km^{2})
  - Water: 0.53 sq mi (1.36 km^{2})

Population (2020)
  - Total: 2,676
  - Density: 103.9/sq mi (40.12/km^{2})
- FIPS code: 36-067-75638
- Website: Town of Tully

Tully is a town in Onondaga County, New York, United States. As of the 2020 census, the population was 2,676. The name of the town is derived from the Roman orator Marcus Tullius Cicero. The town is on the county's southern border, south of Syracuse.

== History ==
Tully was within the former Central New York Military Tract, an area which the federal government reserved to use for granting plots of land as bounty and pay to soldiers and veterans for their service during the American Revolution. The surveyors were responsible for naming the areas. One of the assistant surveyors, being a classical scholar and professor at Kings College (Columbia), assigned names from Roman generals and statesmen, and Greek men of letters. Tully is derived from the middle name of Marcus Tullius Cicero.

This area had been occupied for centuries by the Onondaga people, one of the first Five Nations of the Iroquois Confederacy, or Haudenosaunee. As four of the six nations were allied with the British during the American Revolutionary War, the Onondaga and others were forced to cede their land to the United States after the war. Much was sold and granted to settlers and speculators, and European Americans began to flood into western New York.

The first European-American settler was Andy Tucker, who built a log cabin in 1795. The first town meeting was held on April 4, 1803, when the town was formed from part of the Town of Fabius. The Town of Otisco was partially formed from part of Tully in 1806. When Cortland County was established in 1808, Tully lost its southern parts to the Towns of Preble and Scott in the new county. In 1811, more land was taken from Tully to form the Town of Spafford.

In the late 19th century, the town began to attract more tourists, especially during the summer. Tully Lake Park was developed and the first cottage, a part of the hotel were erected on Tully Lake in 1889. Other cottages and villas were built so that fifty occupied sites by the end of the century. In 1892 the Central New York Assembly established Assembly Park on the east side of the lake. It became the site for annual sessions of an educational nature, similar to those at the celebrated Chautauqua, New York, which is situated on the lake of that name.

In 1998, Aldi opened a regional distribution center in the town on NY-281, off of Interstate 81.

== Geography ==
According to the United States Census Bureau, the town has a total area of 26.3 square miles (68 km^{2}), of which 25.9 square miles (67 km^{2}) is land and 0.4 square miles (1.0 km^{2}) (1.56%) is water.

The southern town line is the border of Cortland County.

Interstate 81, U.S. Route 11, and New York State Route 11A are north–south highways which pass through the town. New York State Route 80 is an east–west highway.

The celebrated Tully Lakes, forming an unbroken chain of natural water gems, consist of Tully (Big), Green, Crooked, Jerry's and Mirror Lakes, of which the first named is the largest and most prominent.

== Demographics ==
Historical population
Census	Pop.	Note	%±
1820	1,123		—
1830	1,640		46.0%
1840	1,663		1.4%
1850	1,559		−6.3%
1860	1,690		8.4%
1870	1,560		−7.7%
1880	1,476		−5.4%
1890	1,380		−6.5%
1900	1,465		6.2%
1910	1,386		−5.4%
1920	1,358		−2.0%
1930	1,461		7.6%
1940	1,430		−2.1%
1950	1,554		8.7%
1960	1,633		5.1%
1970	1,901		16.4%
1980	2,409		26.7%
1990	2,378		−1.3%
2000	2,709		13.9%
2010	2,738		1.1%
2020	2,676		−2.3%
U.S. Decennial Census

As of the census of 2000, there were 2,709 people, 1,030 households, and 744 families residing in the town. The population density was 104.7 inhabitants per square mile (40.4/km^{2}). There were 1,139 housing units at an average density of 44.0 units per square mile (17.0 units/km^{2}). The racial makeup of the town was 97.23% White, 0.44% Black or African American, 0.22% Native American, 0.59% Asian, 0.22% from other races, and 1.29% from two or more races. Hispanic or Latino of any race were 1.11% of the population.

There were 1,030 households, out of which 37.8% had children under the age of 18 living with them, 59.0% were married couples living together, 9.3% had a female householder with no husband present, and 27.7% were non-families. 22.2% of all households were made up of individuals, and 9.3% had someone living alone who was 65 years of age or older. The average household size was 2.59 and the average family size was 3.04.

In the town, the population was spread out, with 28.3% under the age of 18, 5.9% from 18 to 24, 29.4% from 25 to 44, 26.3% from 45 to 64, and 10.0% who were 65 years of age or older. The median age was 37 years. For every 100 females, there were 91.6 males. For every 100 females age 18 and over, there were 87.2 males.

The median income for a household in the town was $53,250, and the median income for a family was $63,266. Males had a median income of $46,667 versus $27,721 for females. The per capita income for the town was $25,223. About 3.9% of families and 6.7% of the population were below the poverty line, including 10.6% of those under age 18 and 5.6% of those age 65 or over.

== Schools ==
Schools in Tully date back to Miss Ruth Thorpe who established a place of learning in Timothy Walker's barn in 1801. The district received its first charter from the Board of Regents to form a high school in 1898. The centralization of the Tully school district occurred in 1930. The centralized school was housed in the current elementary school building with both younger students and high schoolers in the same building. Tully Junior Senior High School is the current school for grades 7–12.

== Notable people ==
- Irving Gill, architect
- Lopez Lomong, US Olympian and carrier of the American flag during the opening ceremonies of the 2008 Beijing Olympics
- Arthur C. Sidman, playwright and actor interred in Tully Cemetery.
- Charles H. Walker, Wisconsin jurist and legislator
- Lyman Walker, Wisconsin lawyer and legislator
- R. Walter Riehlman, congressman interred in Tully Cemetery

== Communities ==
=== Village ===
Within the town is located the village of Tully, a separate municipality.

== Hamlets ==
- Assembly Park – a hamlet by the southern town line, on the east side of Tully lake.
- Crooked Lake – a lake in the southern part of the town, northwest of Tully Lake.
- Green Lake, a lake southwest of Tully Center.
- Tully Center – a hamlet west of Tully village by Interstate 81 by its junction with NY-80 and NY-11A.
- Tully Farms – a location in the north of Tully Center on NY-11A.
- Tully Lake – a lake at the southern town line that is the source of the west branch of the Tioughnioga River.
- Tully Lake Park – a hamlet on the western side of Tully Lake.
- Vesper – a hamlet in the western part of the town on NY Route 80.

== See also ==
- Onondaga Creek
