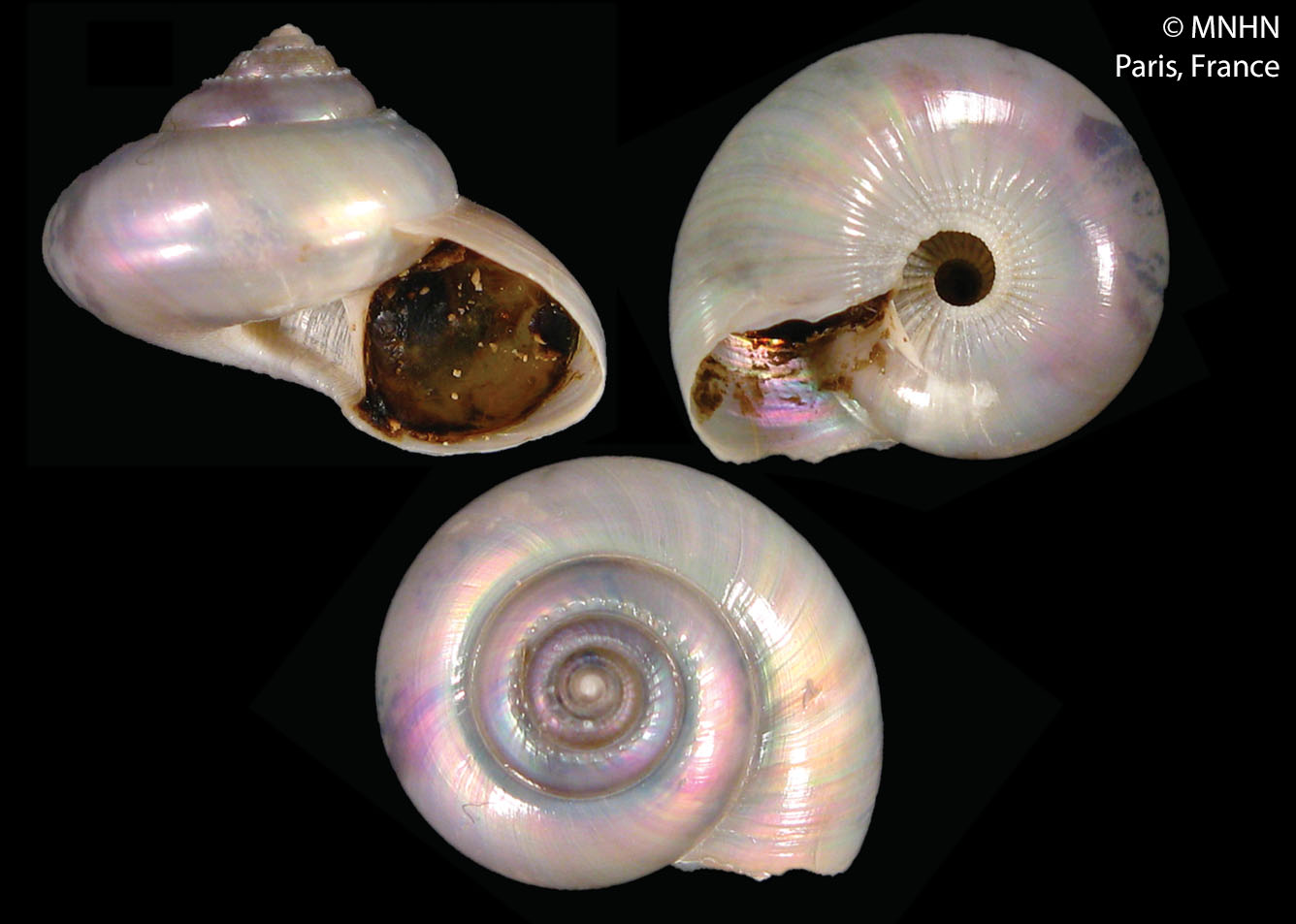

Scientific classification
- Kingdom: Animalia
- Phylum: Mollusca
- Class: Gastropoda
- Subclass: Vetigastropoda
- Order: Trochida
- Superfamily: Trochoidea
- Family: Solariellidae
- Genus: Elaphriella
- Species: E. paulinae

Binomial name
- Elaphriella paulinae Vilvens & Williams, 2016

= Elaphriella paulinae =

Species of gastropod

Elaphriella paulinae is a species of sea snail, a marine gastropod mollusk, in the family Solariellidae.

== Distribution ==
This species occurs in the following locations:

- Austral Islands
- Coral Sea
- Loyalty Ridge
- Solomon Islands
