= Lake Vert (Val-d'Illiez) =

Lake in Valais, Switzerland

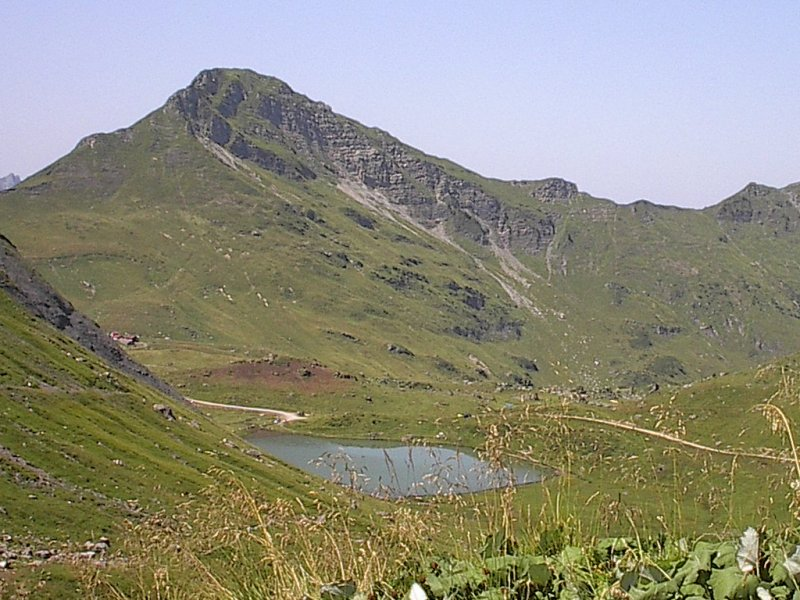

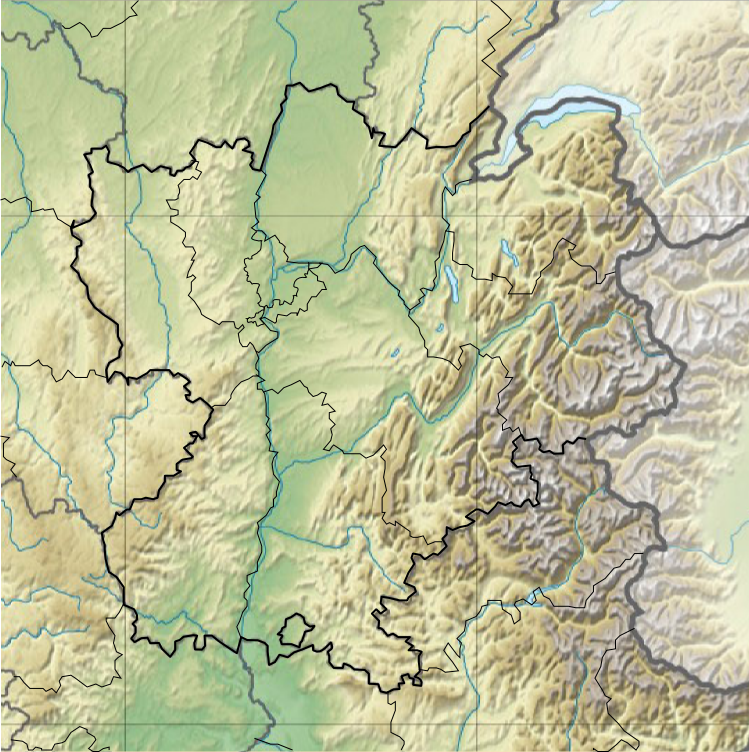
- Location within Canton of Valais Location within Rhône-Alpes Location within Switzerland Location within France Location within Alps
- Interactive map of Lake Vert
- Location: Val-d'Illiez, Valais
- Coordinates: 46°11′47″N 6°48′58″E
- Primary outflows: Vièze de Morgins
- Basin countries: Switzerland
- Surface area: 25 ha (62 acres)
- Surface elevation: 1,972 m (6,470 ft)

Lake Vert is a lake in the Chablais region of the canton of Valais, Switzerland. The lake is located in the municipality of Val-d'Illiez, at an elevation of 1972 metres, near the border with France. Lac de Chésery lies 600 metres north.
