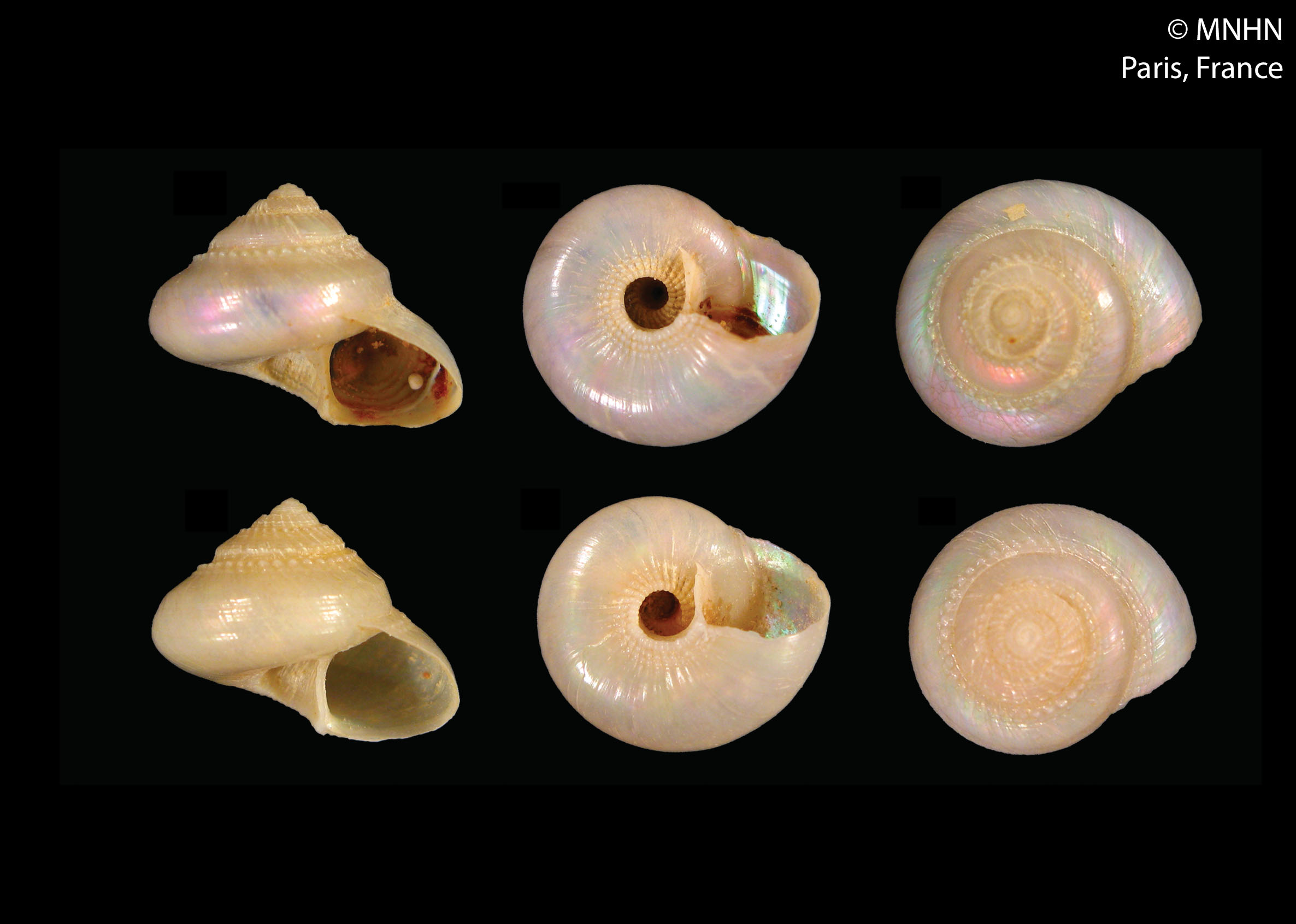

Scientific classification
- Kingdom: Animalia
- Phylum: Mollusca
- Class: Gastropoda
- Subclass: Vetigastropoda
- Order: Trochida
- Superfamily: Trochoidea
- Family: Solariellidae
- Genus: Elaphriella
- Species: E. wareni

Binomial name
- Elaphriella wareni Vilvens & Williams, 2016

= Elaphriella wareni =

Species of gastropod

Elaphriella wareni is a species of sea snail, a marine gastropod mollusk, in the family Solariellidae.

== Distribution ==
This species occurs in the following locations:

- Coral Sea
- Fiji
- Solomon Islands
- Solomon Islands
- Vanuatu part of the South Pacific Ocean
- Wallis and Futuna Islands
