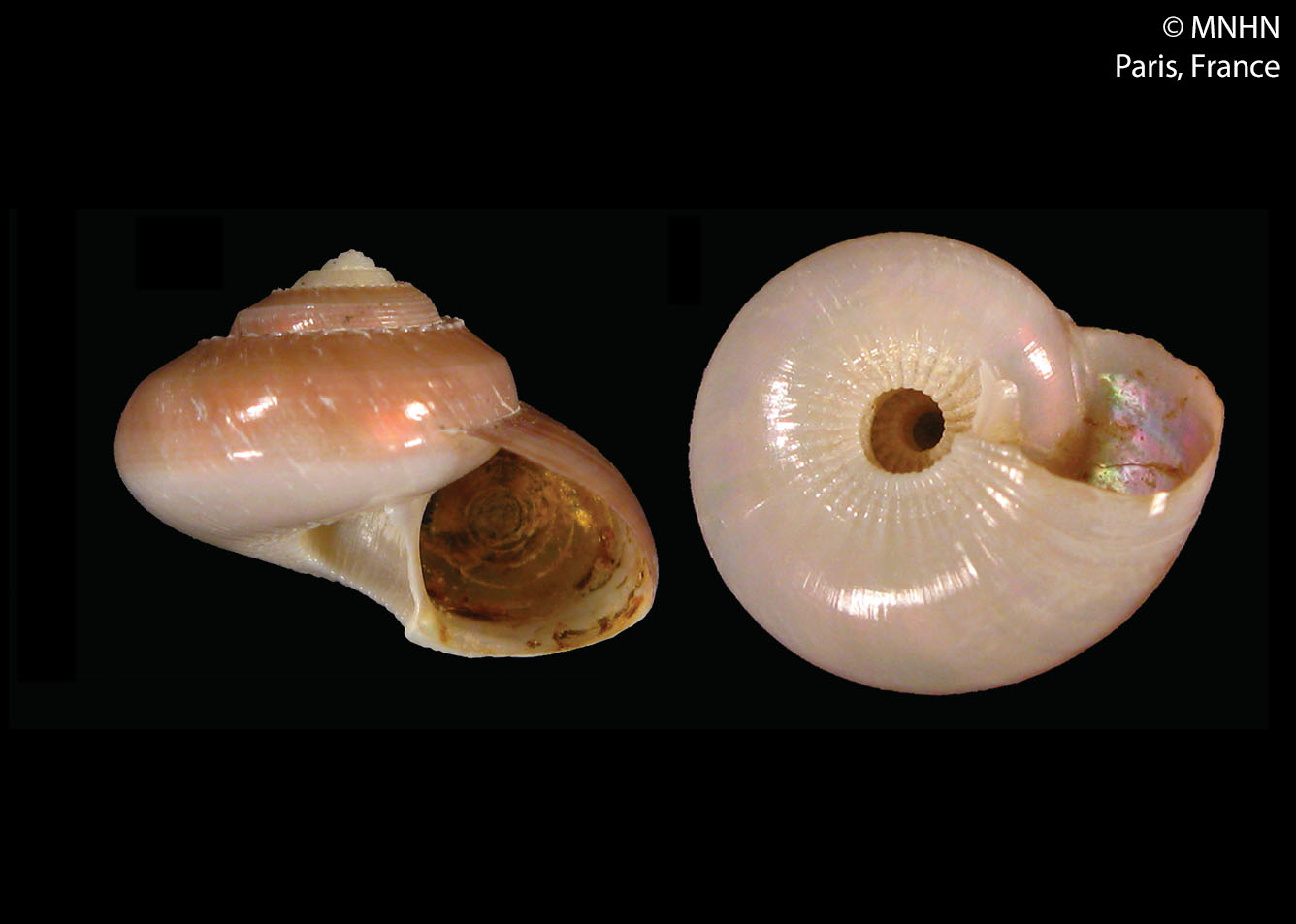
- Shell of Elaphriella cantharos (paratype at MNHN, Paris)

Scientific classification
- Kingdom: Animalia
- Phylum: Mollusca
- Class: Gastropoda
- Subclass: Vetigastropoda
- Order: Trochida
- Superfamily: Trochoidea
- Family: Solariellidae
- Genus: Elaphriella; Vilvens & Williams, 2016

Type species
- Elaphriella cantharos Vilvens & Williams, 2016

= Elaphriella =

Genus of gastropods

Elaphriella is a genus of sea snails, marine gastropod mollusks, in the family Solariellidae.

== Species ==
Species within the genus Elaphriella include:

- Elaphriella cantharos Vilvens & Williams, 2016
- Elaphriella corona (Y.-C. Lee & W.-L. Wu, 2001)
- Elaphriella dikhonikhe Vilvens & Williams, 2016
- Elaphriella diplax (B. A. Marshall, 1999)
- Elaphriella eukhonikhe Vilvens & Williams, 2016
- Elaphriella helios Vilvens & Williams, 2016
- Elaphriella leia Vilvens & Williams, 2016
- Elaphriella meridiana (Dell, 1953)
- Elaphriella olivaceostrigata (Schepman, 1908)
- Elaphriella opalina (Shikama & Hayashi, 1977)
- Elaphriella paulinae Vilvens & Williams, 2016
- Elaphriella wareni Vilvens & Williams, 2016
