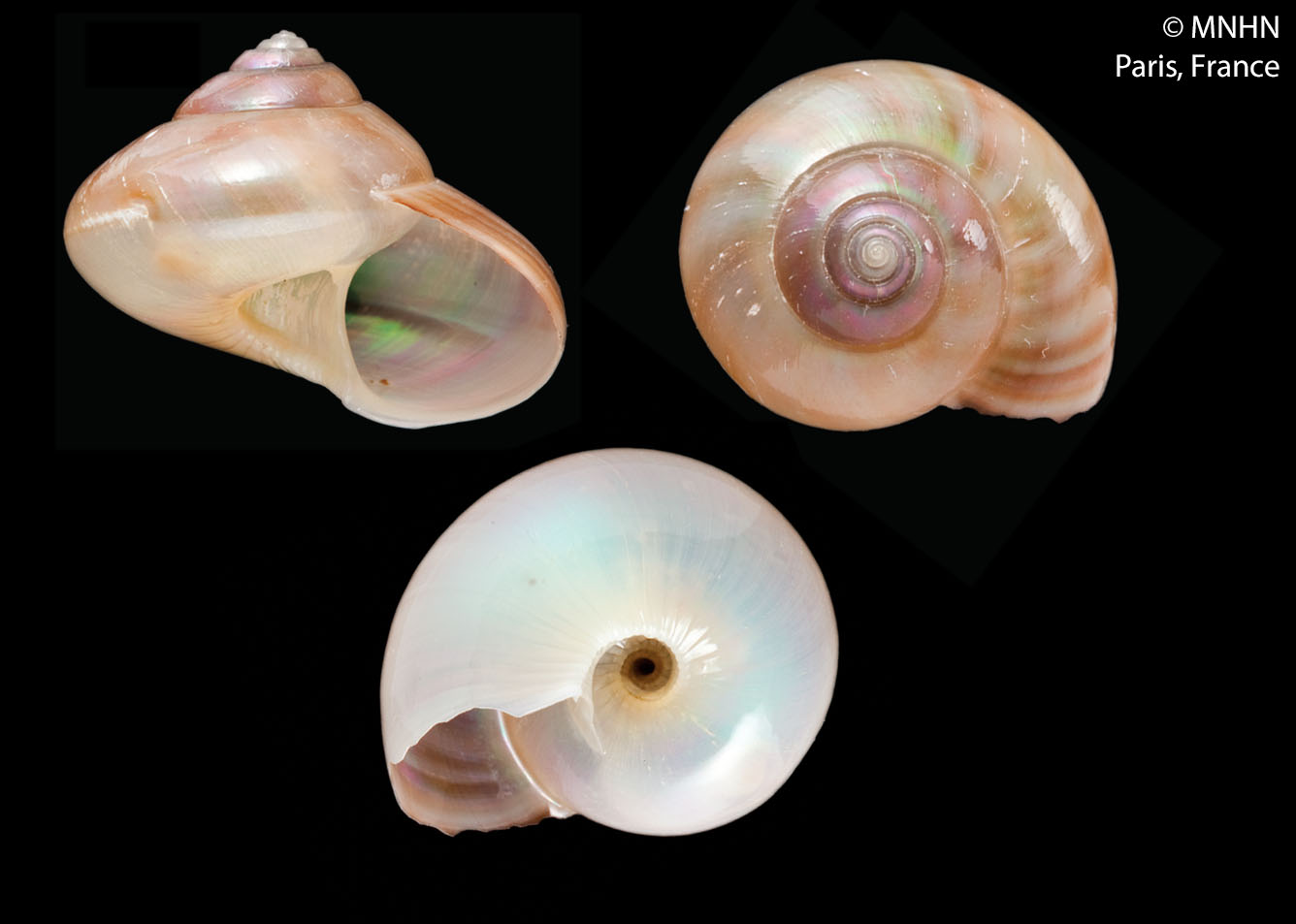

Scientific classification
- Kingdom: Animalia
- Phylum: Mollusca
- Class: Gastropoda
- Subclass: Vetigastropoda
- Order: Trochida
- Superfamily: Trochoidea
- Family: Solariellidae
- Genus: Elaphriella
- Species: E. leia

Binomial name
- Elaphriella leia Vilvens & Williams, 2016

= Elaphriella leia =

Species of gastropod

Elaphriella leia is a species of sea snail, a marine gastropod mollusk, in the family Solariellidae.

== Distribution ==
This species occurs in the Solomon Islands.
