= Crooked Lake (New York) =

Lake in Onondaga County, New York, United States

- Location within New York Location within the United States
- Location: Onondaga County, New York, United States
- Coordinates: 42°46′54″N 76°09′05″W
- Basin countries: United States
- Surface area: 121 acres (0.49 km^{2})
- Average depth: 10 feet (3.0 m)
- Max. depth: 75 ft (23 m)
- Shore length^{1}: 2.7 miles (4.3 km)
- Surface elevation: 1,194 ft (364 m)
- Islands: 3
- Settlements: Tully Center, New York
- ^{1} Shore length is not a well-defined measure.

Crooked Lake is located near Tully Center, New York. Fish species present in the lake include largemouth bass, yellow perch, and pumpkinseed sunfish. There is access via fee boat launch on the west shore off Long Road.
