= First Presbyterian Church (Preble, New York) =

Historic church in New York, United States

- U.S. National Register of Historic Places
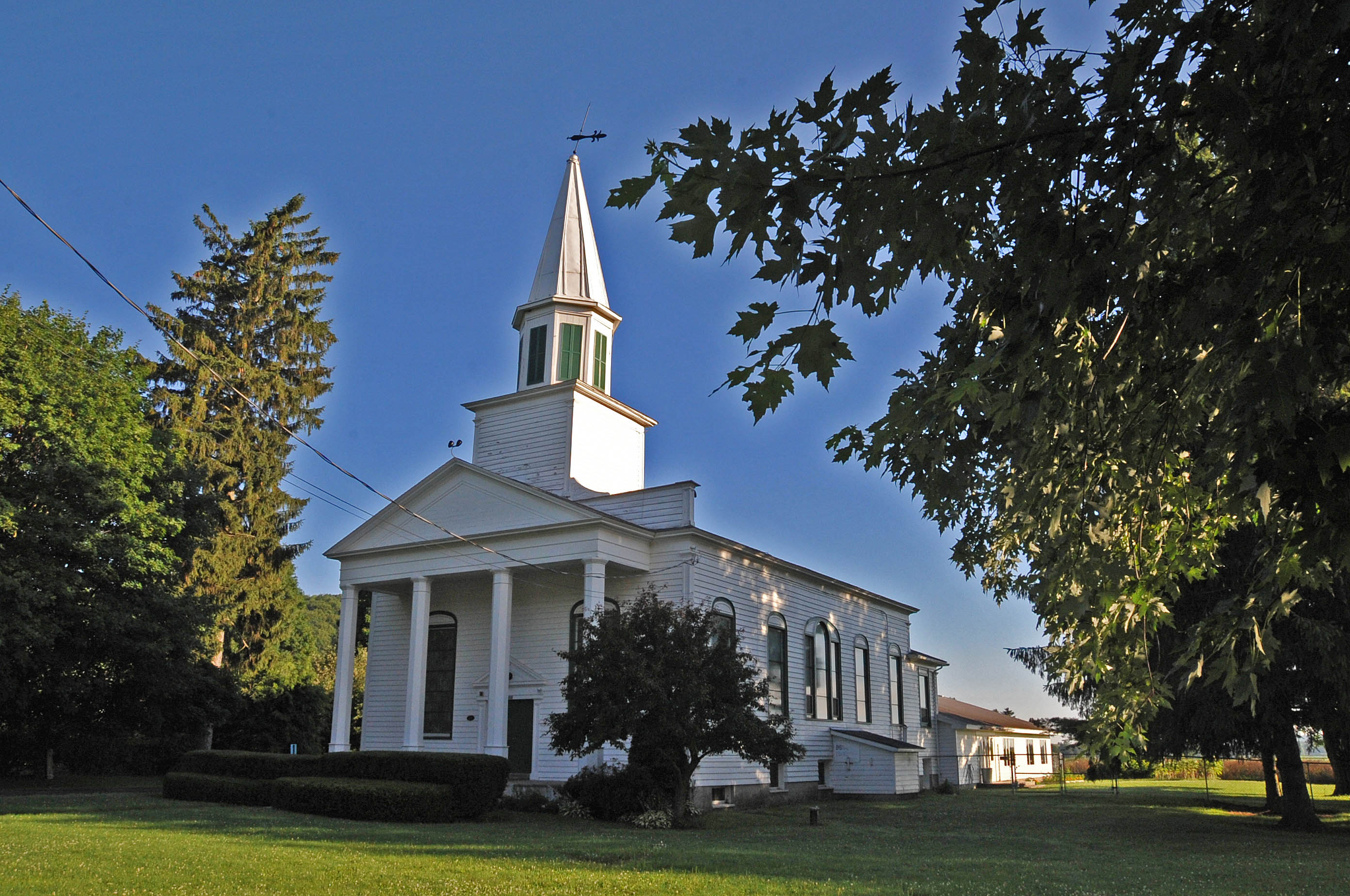

- Location within New York Location within the United States
- Location: 1953 Preble Rd. 108B, Preble, New York
- Coordinates: 42°44′6″N 76°8′47″W
- Area: less than one acre
- Built: 1831
- Architect: Dennis, Earl
- Architectural style: Federal, Colonial Revival
- NRHP reference No.: 01001502
- Added to NRHP: January 24, 2002

First Presbyterian Church, also known as Preble Congregational Church, is a historic Presbyterian church located at Preble in Cortland County, New York. It was built in about 1831 as a conventional meetinghouse in the Federal style. It was moved to its present location in 1859, renovated in the Gothic Revival style in 1865, and thoroughly remodeled again in 1923 to the present Colonial Revival style. The two stage bell tower dates to 1831. The interior features furnishings by Gustav Stickley and stained glass by Henry Keck.

It was listed on the National Register of Historic Places in 2002.
