= Elaphriella opalina =

Scientific classification
- Kingdom: Animalia
- Phylum: Mollusca
- Class: Gastropoda
- Subclass: Vetigastropoda
- Order: Trochida
- Superfamily: Trochoidea
- Family: Solariellidae
- Genus: Elaphriella
- Species: E. opalina

Binomial name
- Elaphriella opalina (Shikama & Hayashi, 1977)

Synonyms
- Archiminolia opalina (Shikama & Hayashi, 1977) superseded combination; Microgaza opalina (Shikama & Hayashi, 1977) superseded combination; Minolia opalina Shikama & Hayashi, 1977; Solariella (Microgaza) opalina Shikama & Hayashi, 1977 (basionym); Solariella opalina Shikama & Hayashi, 1977 (original combination)

Species of gastropod

Elaphriella opalina is a species of small sea snail, a marine gastropod mollusk in the family Solariellidae. The species was first described in 1977 by Tokio Shikama based on three specimen collected in Japan and submitted to the Yokohama National University for identification.

== Description ==
E. opalina is comparable to species of Solariella in its structure and appearance, but with distinctive features, such as its angulated shoulder, as well as nodulous subsutural band and fasciole.

The size of the shell attains 15 mm.

== Distribution ==
This marine species occurs off Japan, Taiwan and the Philippines.
