= Little York Pavilion =

- U.S. National Register of Historic Places
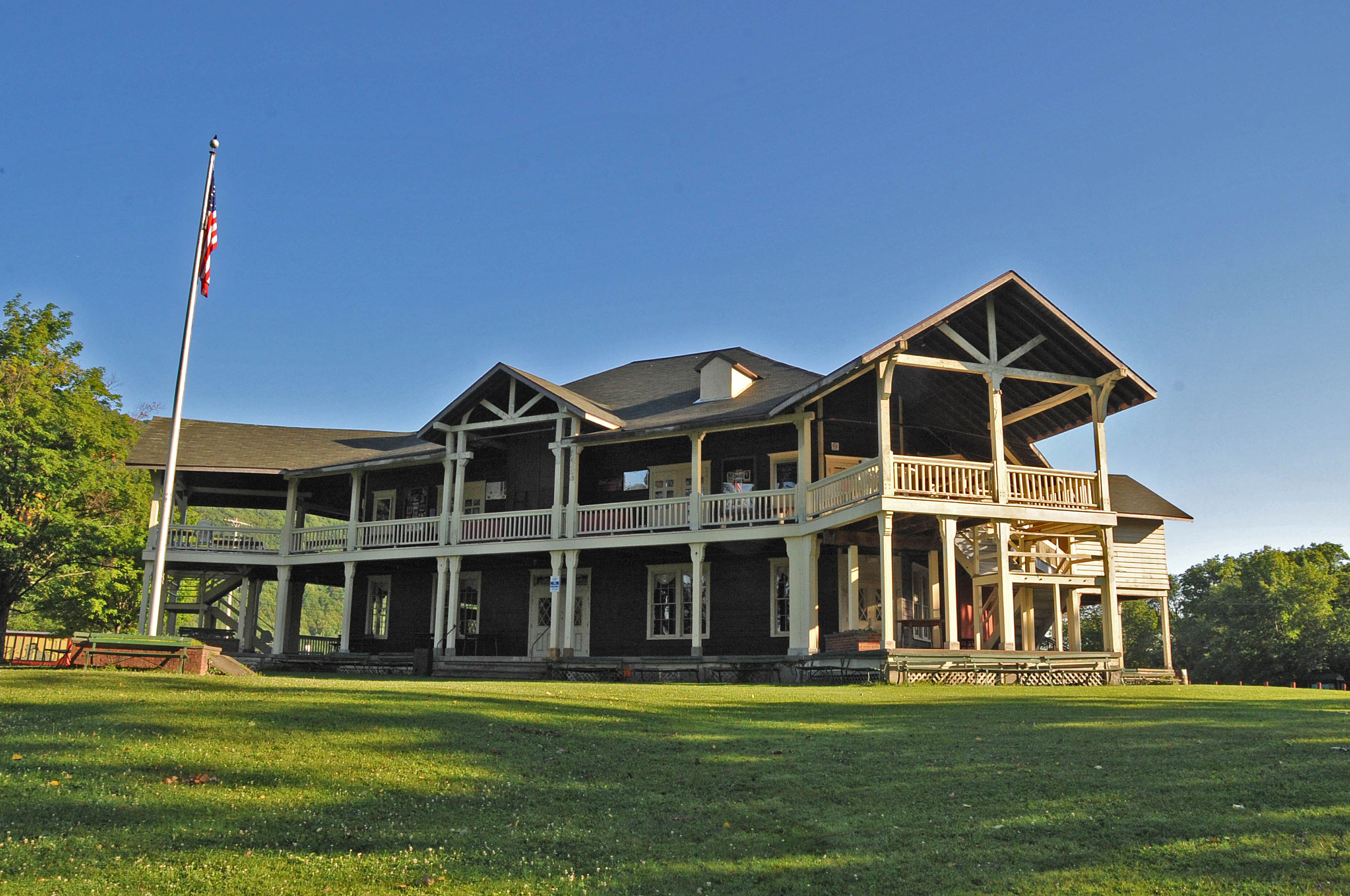

- Location within New York Location within the United States
- Nearest city: Preble, New York
- Coordinates: 42°42′37″N 76°9′11″W
- Area: 7 acres (2.8 ha)
- Built: 1906
- Architect: Barker, Cephas B.
- Architectural style: Stick/Eastlake
- NRHP reference No.: 79001575
- Added to NRHP: July 27, 1979

Little York Pavilion, also known as Dwyer Memorial County Park, Main Pavilion, is an historic trolley park pavilion located at Preble in Cortland County, New York. It was built about 1906, with later additions and modifications, and is a two-story Stick/Eastlake style structure, rectangular at the core, with surrounding verandahs and a jutting pavilion at each corner. The central hip-roofed section contains a single large room at each level.

It was listed on the National Register of Historic Places in 1979.

The Pavilion was originally designed as part of a resort destination by the Cortland Traction Company. Little York Lake provided the only resort area between Binghamton and Syracuse, NY. Besides the Pavilion the park housed several boathouses, an observation deck above a water tower, and amusement rides. The Pavilion itself housed a restaurant on the ground floor and a dance hall on the second floor.

In 1932, the New York Power Corporation, successor to the Cortland County Traction Company, abandoned the park. Attempted revivals met with little success. At the urging of the Little York Garden Club in the late 1930s, the County Board of Supervisors eventually purchased the property. But not until 1951, under County Highway Superintendent William Dwyer, were improvements seriously begun.

Since 1972 the Pavilion has been home to the Cortland Repertory Theatre, a summer performing company.

The building has undergone many changes over the years. The most prominent addition was in 1961, when a slate-roofed stone restroom facility was added on the north side. A large brick chimney occupies the center of the east wall; a similar one on the north was removed in 1973. Later alterations include the enclosure of the ten foot wide verandahs on the north side to accommodate kitchen facilities and dressing rooms for the theatre. The roof of the pavilion was originally surfaced with cedar shingles and was edged with white electric lights. Both roof and lighting were removed long ago, and the present roof is a combination of tin and asphalt shingles. Elsewhere, alterations have been carried out more in sympathy with the original design: stairways, porch rails and flooring have been rebuilt, fire doors installed, and wooden steps replaced with concrete.
