= Lake Te Paritu =

Lake in New Zealand

- Black Lake
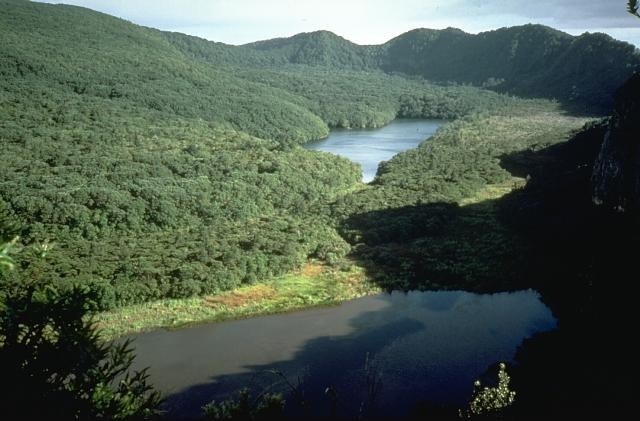
- Caldera of the Mayor Island (New Zealand) in 1986

- Location within North Island
- Coordinates: 37°17′29″S 176°16′3″E
- Basin countries: New Zealand
- Surface area: 3.2 hectares (7.9 acres)

Lake Te Paritu, also known as Black Lake, is one of two small crater lakes on Mayor Island / Tuhua in the Bay of Plenty, New Zealand. It is connected to the larger Lake Aroarotamahine or Green Lake by a wetland, but there is no surface outlet to the sea as both lakes are in a depression.

== Black colour ==
The lake has a black colour due to fine sediment. According to Māori legend, the black is the blood of Tuhua (obsidian) which fought a battle with pounamu (greenstone) who, defeated, fled to the South Island.
