= Elaphriella meridiana =

Scientific classification
- Kingdom: Animalia
- Phylum: Mollusca
- Class: Gastropoda
- Subclass: Vetigastropoda
- Order: Trochida
- Superfamily: Trochoidea
- Family: Solariellidae
- Genus: Elaphriella
- Species: E. meridiana

Binomial name
- Elaphriella meridiana (Dell, 1953)

Synonyms
- Archiminolia meridiana (Dell, 1953); Spectamen meridianum Powell, 1976; Zeminolia meridiana Dell, 1953

Species of gastropod

Elaphriella meridiana is a species of sea snail, a marine gastropod mollusk in the family Solariellidae.

== Description ==
The size of the shell varies between 5 mm and 6.5 mm.

== Distribution ==
This marine species is endemic to New Zealand at occurs off Chatham Rise at a depth of 360 m.
