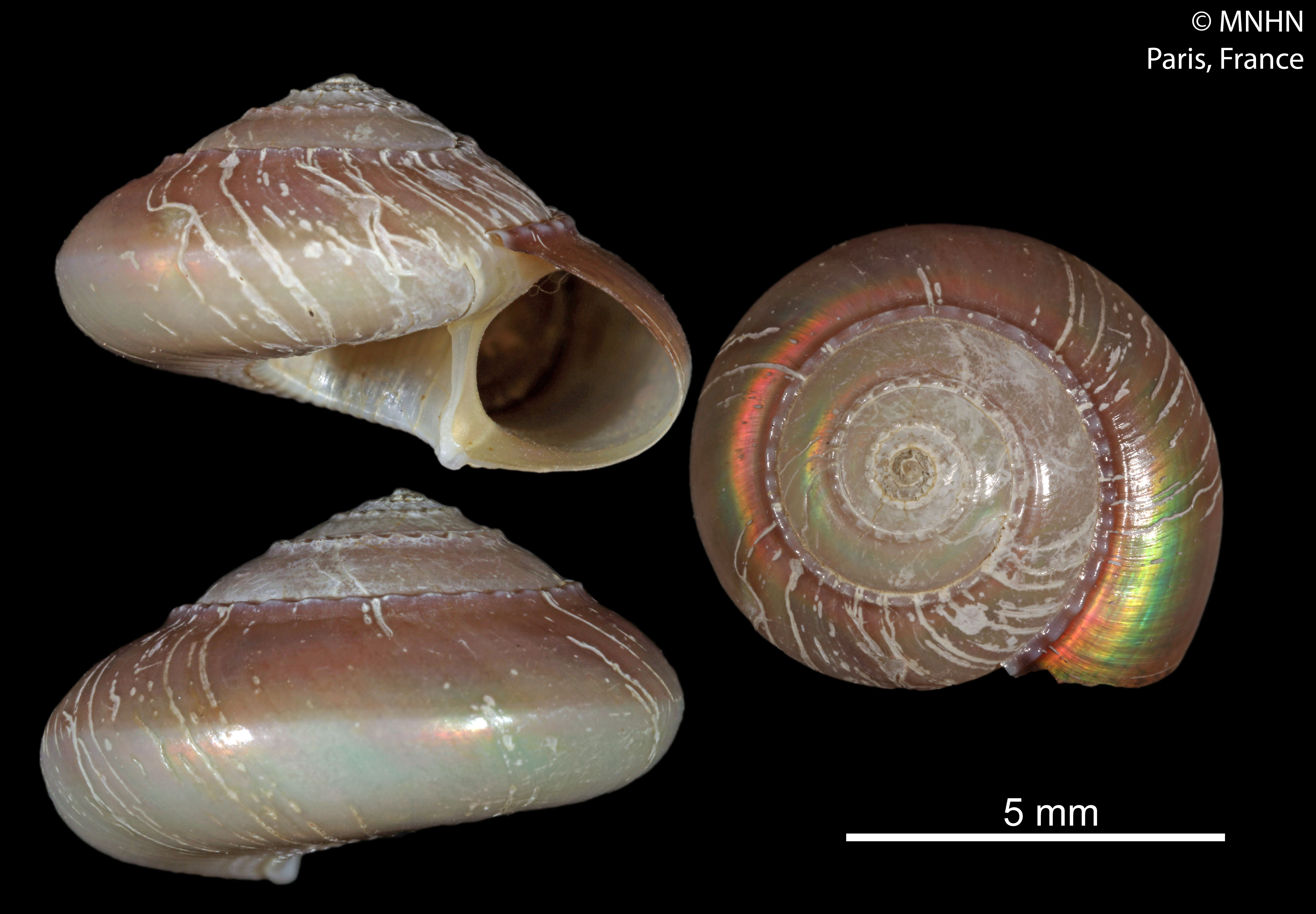
- Shell of Elaphriella corona (specimen at MNHN, Paris)

Scientific classification
- Kingdom: Animalia
- Phylum: Mollusca
- Class: Gastropoda
- Subclass: Vetigastropoda
- Order: Trochida
- Superfamily: Trochoidea
- Family: Solariellidae
- Genus: Elaphriella
- Species: E. corona

Binomial name
- Elaphriella corona (Lee Y.C. & Wu W.L., 2001)

Synonyms
- Microgaza corona Y.-C. Lee & W.-L. Wu, 2001 (original combination)

= Elaphriella corona =

Species of gastropod

Elaphriella corona is a species of sea snail, a marine gastropod mollusk in the family Solariellidae.

== Distribution ==
This marine species occurs off Indonesia.
