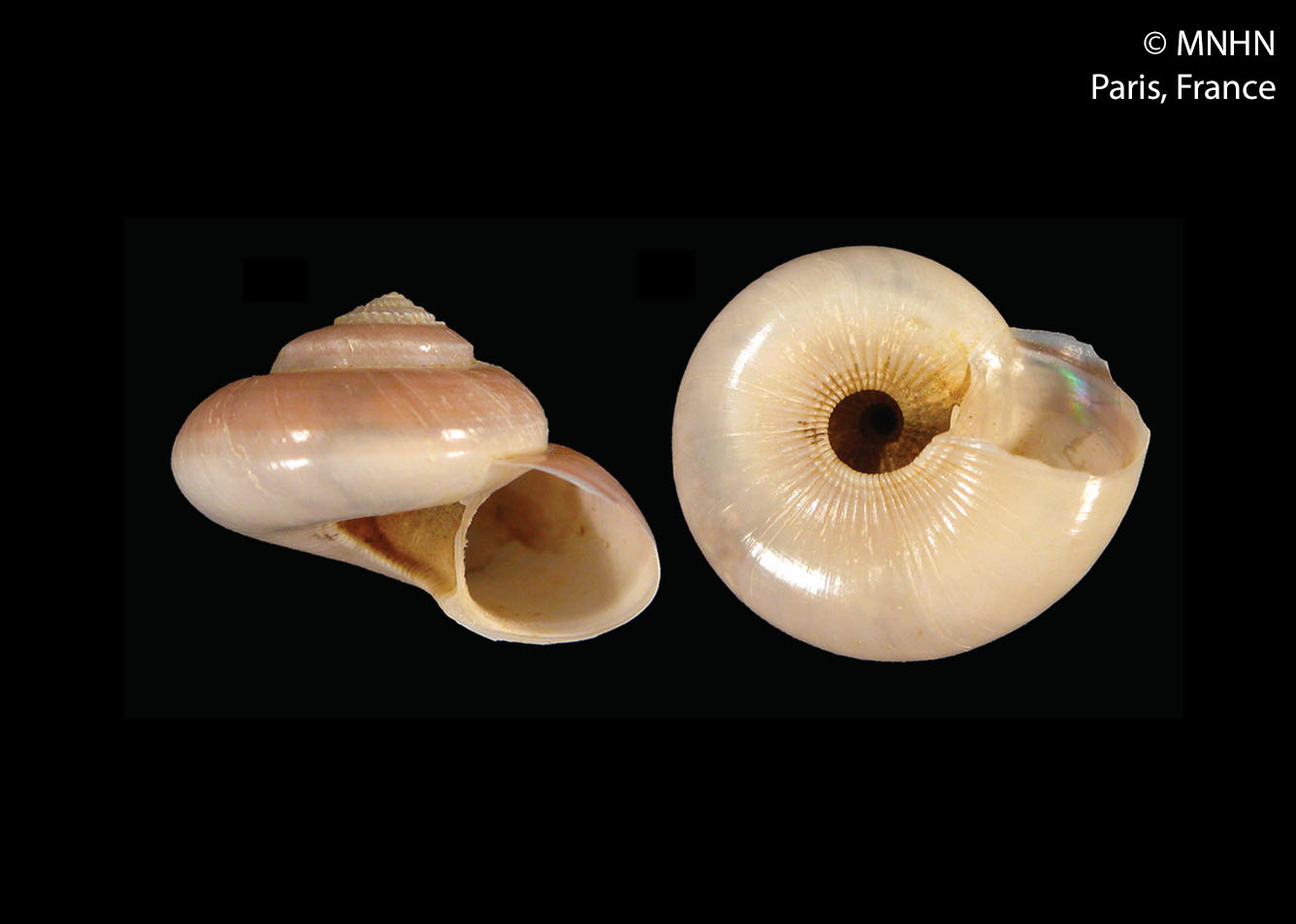

Scientific classification
- Kingdom: Animalia
- Phylum: Mollusca
- Class: Gastropoda
- Subclass: Vetigastropoda
- Order: Trochida
- Superfamily: Trochoidea
- Family: Solariellidae
- Genus: Elaphriella
- Species: E. cantharos

Binomial name
- Elaphriella cantharos Vilvens & Williams, 2016

= Elaphriella cantharos =

Species of gastropod

Elaphriella cantharos is a species of sea snail, a marine gastropod mollusk, in the family Solariellidae.

== Distribution ==
This species occurs in the following locations:

- Papua New Guinea
- Society Islands
- Solomon Islands
