= Green Lake (Cortland County, New York) =

- Location within New York Green Lake (the United States)
- Location: Cortland County, New York, United States
- Coordinates: 42°42′53″N 76°09′01″W
- Type: Lake
- Primary outflows: Upper Little York Lake
- Basin countries: United States
- Surface area: 20 acres (0.081 km^{2})
- Average depth: 5 feet (1.5 m)
- Max. depth: 20 ft (6.1 m)
- Shore length^{1}: 1 mile (1.6 km)
- Surface elevation: 1,158 ft (353 m)
- Settlements: Preble, New York
- ^{1} Shore length is not a well-defined measure.

Green Lake is located near Preble, New York. Fish species present in the lake include largemouth bass, pickerel, and pumpkinseed sunfish. There is access via channel from Upper Little York Lake.
