= Lac Vert (Lesponne) =

Small lake in the Hautes-Pyrénées, France

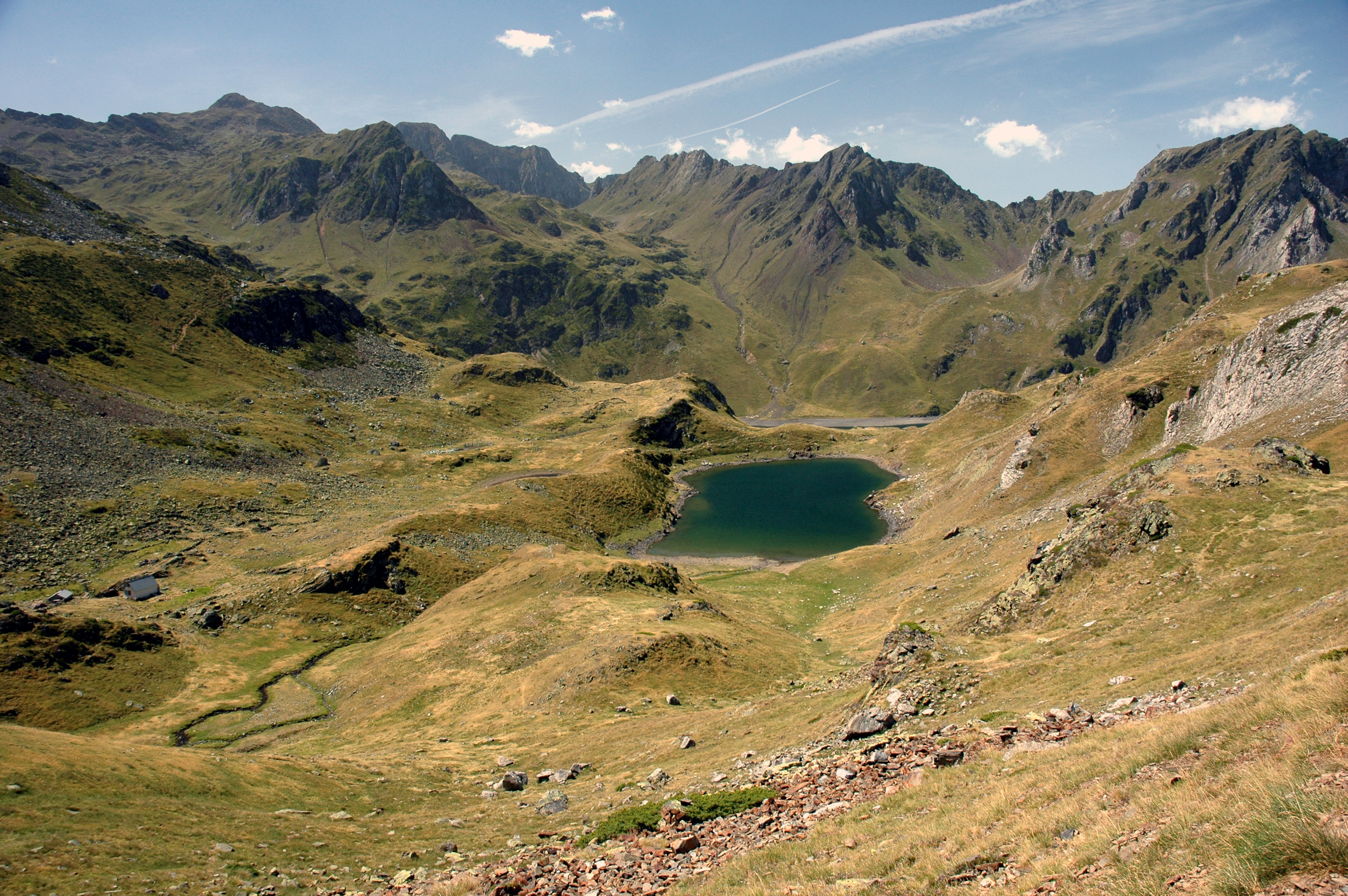

- Location within Pyrenees
- Location: Hautes-Pyrénées
- Coordinates: 42°56′0″N 0°5′16″E
- Basin countries: France
- Surface area: 1.4 ha (3.5 acres)
- Surface elevation: 2,011 m (6,598 ft)

Lac Vert is a small lake in Hautes-Pyrénées, France. At an elevation of 2,009 metres (6,591 ft), its surface area is 1.4 hectares (3.5 acres).
