= Lake Aroarotamahine =

Lake in New Zealand

Lake Aroarotamahine Green Lake
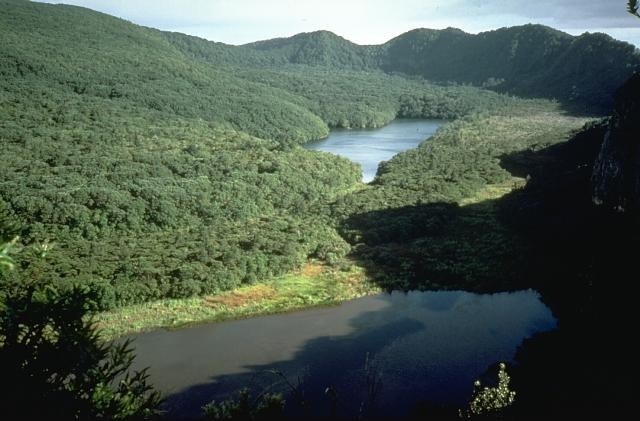
- Caldera of the Mayor Island (New Zealand ). 1986.

- Location within New Zealand
- Coordinates: 37°17′0″S 176°16′2″E
- Basin countries: New Zealand
- Surface area: 10.5 hectares (26 acres)

Lake Aroarotamahine, also known as Green Lake, is one of two small crater lakes on Mayor Island / Tūhua in the Bay of Plenty, New Zealand. Its outlet is a wetland leading to the smaller Lake Te Paritu or Black lake.

The lake has a green colour due to algae. According to Māori legend, the green is the blood of Pounamu (greenstone) which fought a battle with Tuhua (obsidian), and, defeated, fled to the South Island.
