= Laguna Verde (Comarapa) =

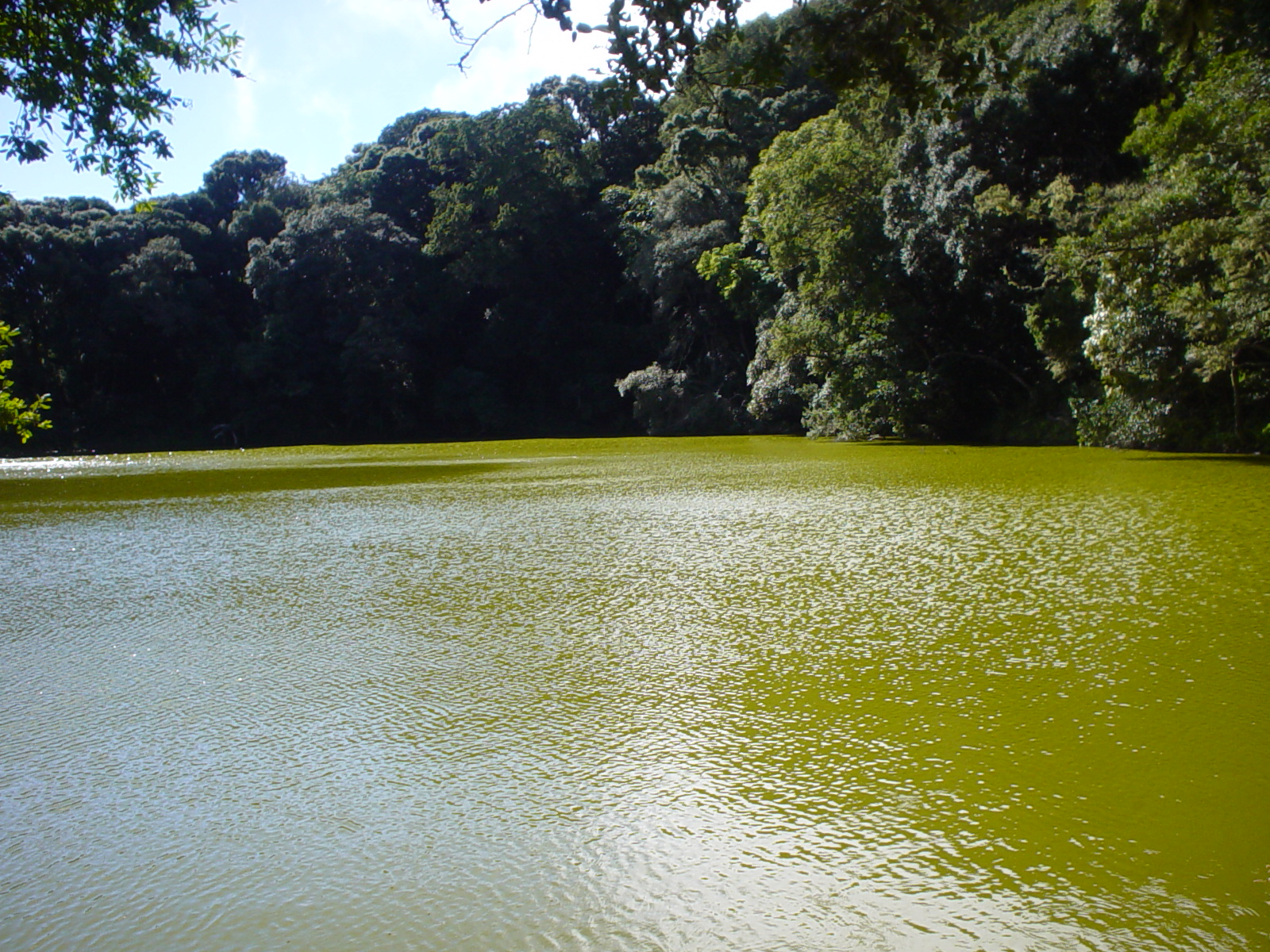

- Location within Bolivia Location within South America
- Interactive map of Laguna Verde
- Location: Santa Cruz, Manuel María Caballero
- Coordinates: 17°52′40″S 64°30′46″W
- Lake type: salt lake
- Primary inflows: lluvia
- Primary outflows: evaporation
- Basin countries: Bolivia
- Surface area: 0.002 km^{2} (22,000 ft^{2})
- Max. depth: 8 m (26 ft)
- Surface elevation: 2,419 m (7,936 ft)
- Islands: none

Laguna Verde (Spanish for "green lake") is a lake in Bolivia located 12 km north of the town Comarapa in the Manuel María Caballero Province in Santa Cruz. It is named after the colour of the water which is caused by algae, usually green but, in times of drought, the colour may change to grey or even yellow.

== Geography ==
The lake is part of an area of 70 hectares of forest and declared the 2006 Ecological Civil Servitude by a project funded by the foundation Environmental Protection Tarija at a cost of U.S. $30,000, while the Foundation friends of Nature ran wiring works, building a cabin and a tourist trail. It lies at an altitude of 2,419 m (7,936 ft) and has an area of approximately 2,000 m^{2} (22,000 ft^{2}) It has a maximum depth of 8 metres.

Among the fauna, as a passage and supply are the wild turkeys, puma and occasionally the spectacled Andean bear. More than 400 species of birds come to Laguna Verde during the migration season.
