= Upper Little York Lake =

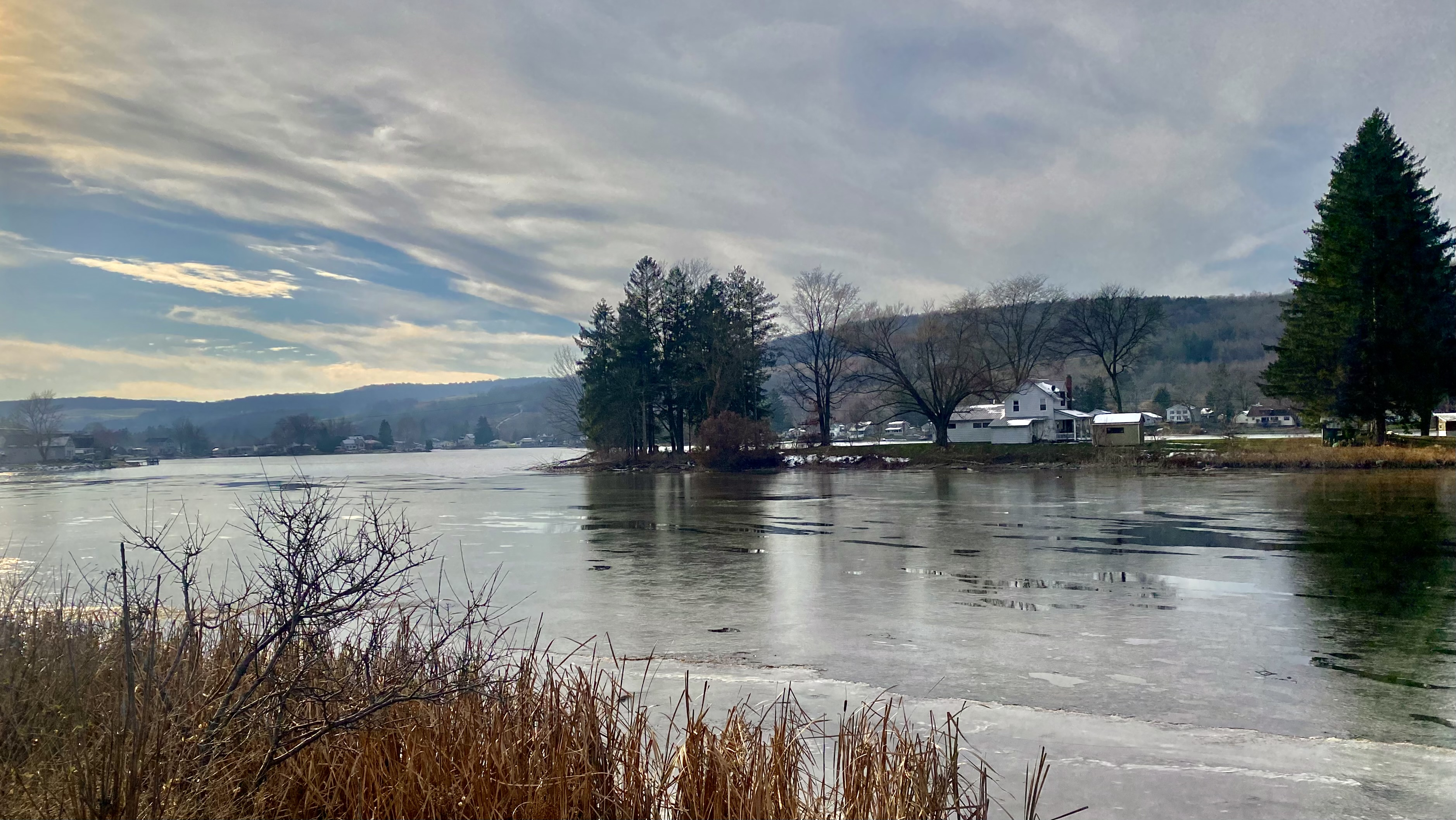
- Partially frozen Upper Little York Lake as seen from Interstate 81, Preble, New York

- Location within New York Upper Little York Lake (the United States)
- Location: Cortland County, New York, United States
- Coordinates: 42°42′12″N 76°09′21″W
- Type: Lake
- Primary inflows: Green Lake, Goodale Lake
- Primary outflows: West Branch Tioughnioga River
- Basin countries: United States
- Surface area: 101 acres (0.41 km^{2})
- Average depth: 5 feet (1.5 m)
- Max. depth: 20 ft (6.1 m)
- Shore length^{1}: 1.4 miles (2.3 km)
- Surface elevation: 1,152 ft (351 m)
- Settlements: Little York, New York
- ^{1} Shore length is not a well-defined measure.

Upper Little York Lake is located near Little York, New York. Fish species present in the lake include bluegill, brown trout, rainbow trout, and pumpkinseed sunfish. There is access via boat launch in Dwyer Memorial Park on the north shore off Little York Road.
