= Bosencheve National Park =

National park in State of Mexico, Mexico

- Bosencheve Buffer Zone
- IUCN category II (national park)
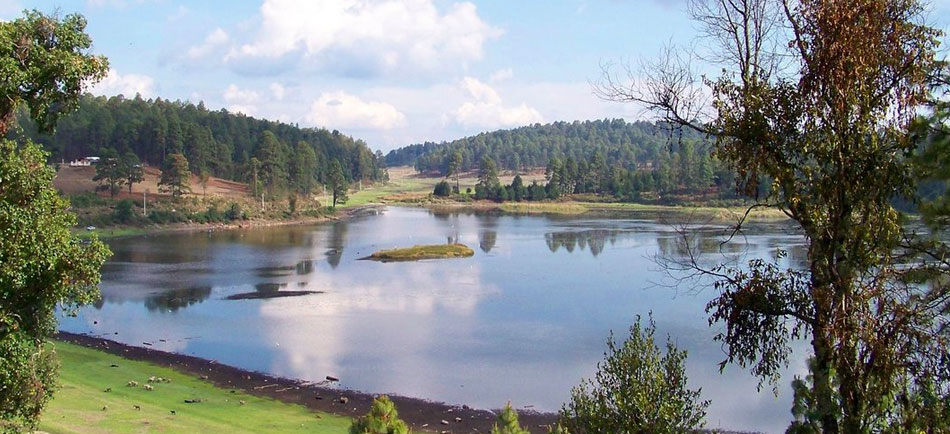

- Location within Mexico
- Interactive map of Bosencheve National Park
- Location: Michoacán, Mexico and State of Mexico, Mexico
- Coordinates: 19.4155°N 100.109°W
- Area: 146 km^{2} (14,600 ha)
- Established: 1940
- Governing body: National Commission of Natural Protected Areas

Bosencheve National Park, also known as the Bosencheve Buffer Zone, is a national park and protected area located in Michoacán, Mexico and State of Mexico, Mexico. The park was established in 1940 and is approximately 146 square kilometers. The national park has two lakes, Lago Verde and Lago Seca. The park a good amount of hiking trails. It is also 2 hours west of Mexico City.
