= Grünsee (Berchtesgadener Land) =

Lake in Schönau am Königsee, Bavaria, Germany

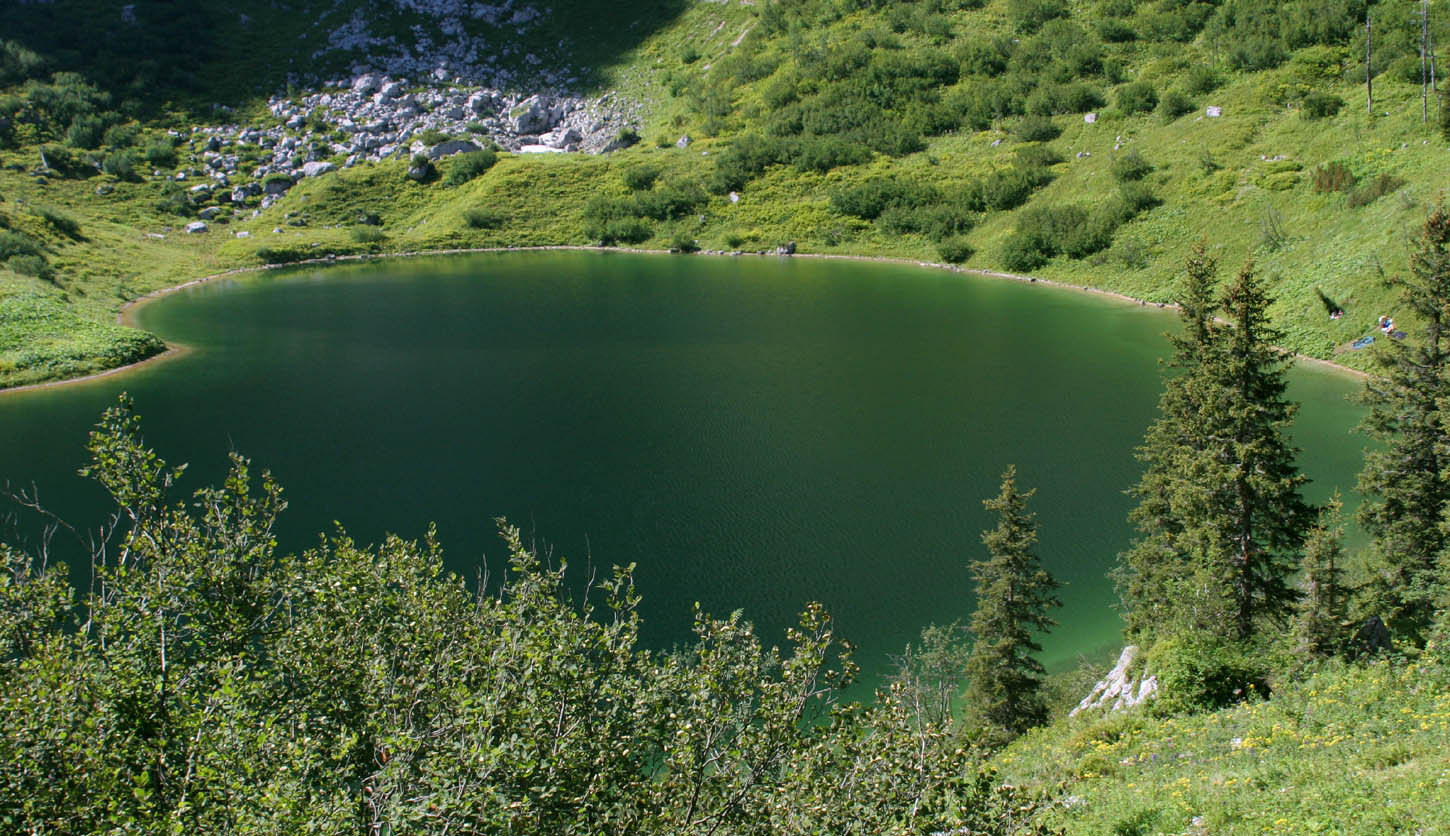

- Location within Bavaria
- Location: Bavaria
- Coordinates: 47°30′07″N 12°57′11″E
- Primary outflows: subterrean
- Catchment area: 2 km^{2} (0.77 sq mi)
- Basin countries: Germany
- Max. length: 320 m (1,050 ft)
- Max. width: 120 m (390 ft)
- Surface area: 3.92 ha (9.7 acres)
- Average depth: 5.2 m (17 ft)
- Max. depth: 9.2 m (30 ft)
- Water volume: 204,000 m^{3} (7,200,000 cu ft)
- Shore length^{1}: 0.8 km (0.50 mi)
- Surface elevation: 1,474 m (4,836 ft)
- Settlements: Grünsee-Alm (verf.)
- ^{1} Shore length is not a well-defined measure.

Grünsee (Berchtesgadener Land) is a lake in Bavaria, Germany. At an elevation of 1474 m, its surface area is 3.92 ha.
