= Lac Vert (Lot) =

- Location within France
- Location: Catus, Lot
- Coordinates: 44°32′57″N 1°19′33″E
- Type: reservoir
- Primary outflows: Vert
- Basin countries: France
- Surface area: 0.07 km^{2} (0.027 sq mi)
- Surface elevation: 160 m (520 ft)

Lac Vert is a lake at Catus in the Lot department, France. At an elevation of 160 m, its surface area is 0.07 km².
