= Tully Lake (New York) =

Lake in New York, United States

- Location within New York Location within the United States
- Location: Onondaga County, Cortland County, New York, United States
- Coordinates: 42.7763995°N 76.1352392°W
- Basin countries: United States
- Surface area: 230 acres (0.93 km^{2})
- Average depth: 8 feet (2.4 m)
- Max. depth: 34 ft (10 m)
- Shore length^{1}: 6.1 miles (9.8 km)
- Surface elevation: 1,194 ft (364 m)
- Islands: 1
- Settlements: Tully Center, New York
- ^{1} Shore length is not a well-defined measure.

Tully Lake is located near Tully Center, New York. Fish species present in the lake include carp, yellow perch, and pumpkinseed sunfish. There is access via state owned carry down on Friendly Lane. There is a 7-horsepower motor limit.
