= Lago Verde (Queyras) =

Lake in Italy

- Location within Italy
- Location: Italy
- Coordinates: 44°49′39.6″N 7°01′15.2″E

Lago Verde (Italian for "green lake") is a lake which is located in Italy, close to the French border and the Queyras valley.
