= Green Lake (Herkimer County, New York) =

- Location within New York Green Lake (the United States)
- Location: Herkimer County, New York
- Coordinates: 43°39′03″N 74°54′37″W
- Type: Lake
- Basin countries: United States
- Surface area: 28 acres (11 ha)
- Surface elevation: 1,621 ft (494 m)
- Settlements: Bisby Lodge

Green Lake is a small lake located northeast of Bisby Lodge in Herkimer County, New York.

== See also ==
- List of lakes in New York
