= Lac de Chésery =

Lake in Valais, Switzerland

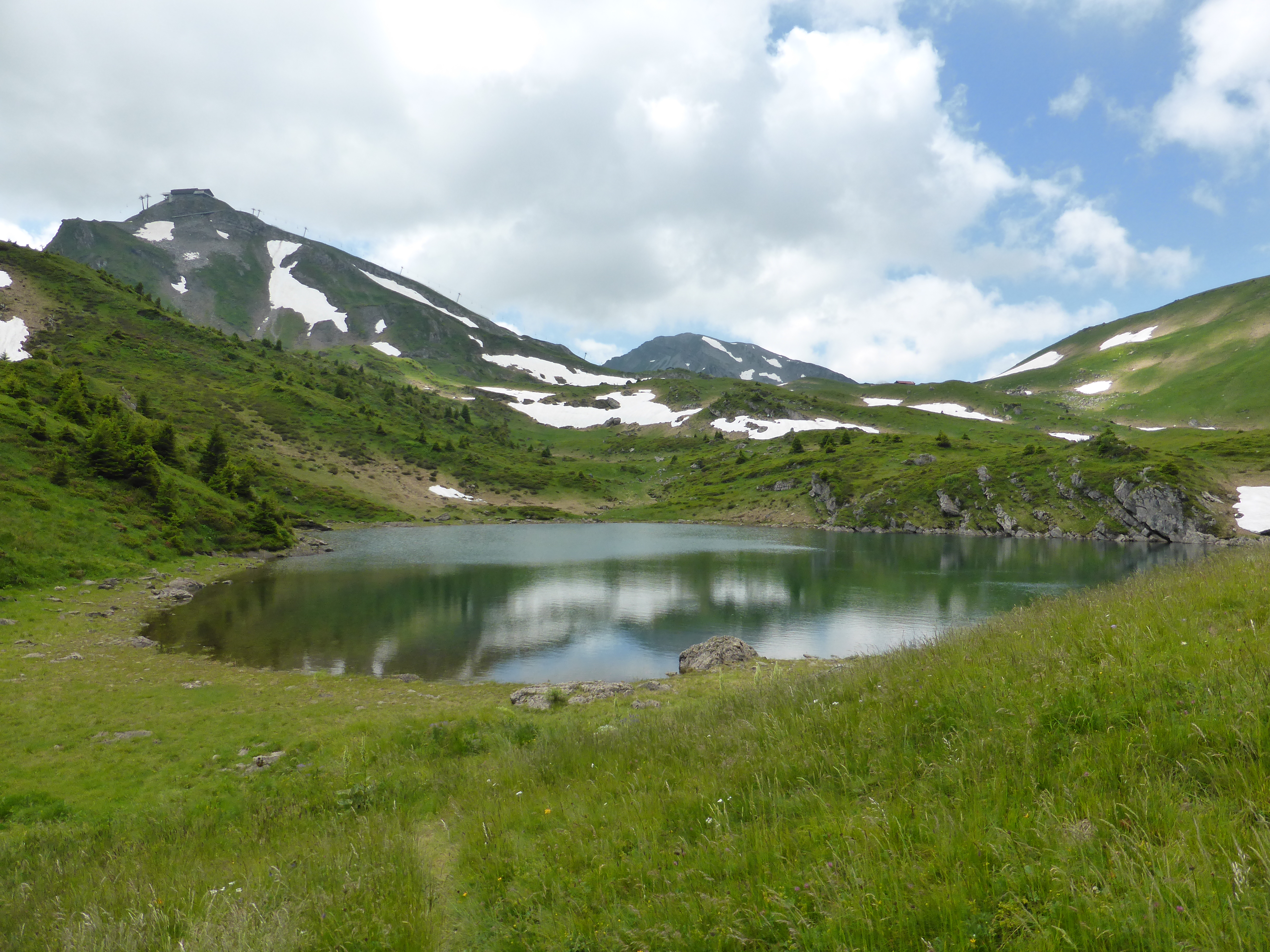
- Lac de Chésery

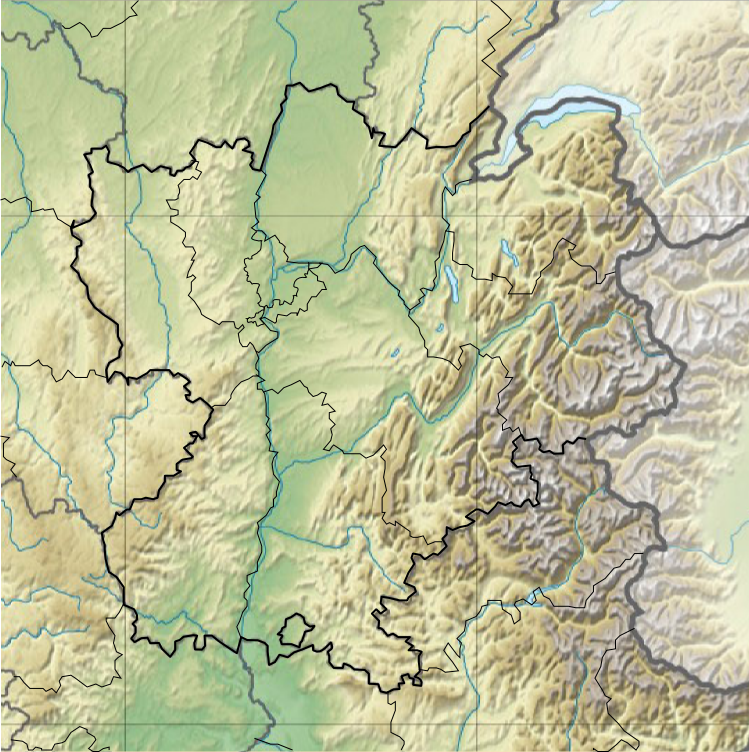
- Location within Canton of Valais Location within Rhône-Alpes Location within Switzerland Location within France Location within Alps
- Interactive map of Lac de Chésery
- Location: Monthey, Valais
- Coordinates: 46°11′46″N 6°48′57″E
- Basin countries: Switzerland
- Surface area: 0.41 ha (1.0 acre)
- Surface elevation: 1,891 m (6,204 ft)

Lac de Chésery is a lake in the municipality of Monthey, canton of Valais, Switzerland. It is located close to the French border, below the Pointe de Chésery.
