= Green Lake (Isanti County, Minnesota) =

Lake in the state of Minnesota, United States

- Location within Minnesota
- Location: Isanti County, Minnesota
- Coordinates: 45°34′24″N 93°26′23″W
- Type: lake

Green Lake is a lake in Isanti County, in the U.S. state of Minnesota.

Green Lake was named for the greenish tint frequently caused by algae.

== See also ==
- List of lakes in Minnesota
