= Mayor Island / Tūhua =

New Zealand shield volcano

Native name: Tūhua (Māori)
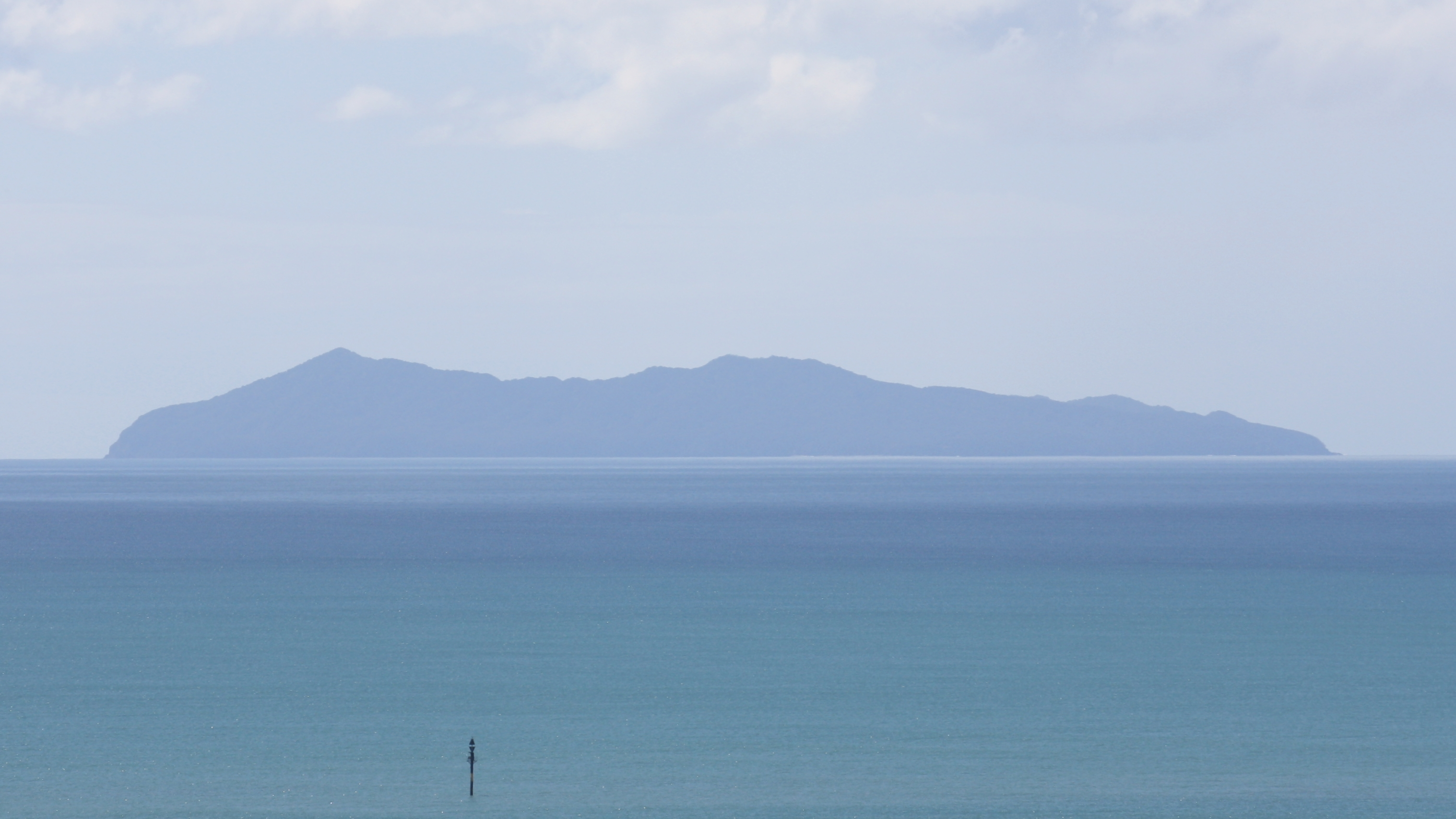
- Mayor Island / Tūhua as seen from Mount Maunganui
- Mayor Island / Tūhua surface volcanics map with the predominant rhyolitic volcanics coloured violet. The approximate submarine Tūhua volcanic field extent is shown in grey. The island to Tūhua's south coloured in orange-red is Mōtītī which has a basaltic andesite`origin. Legend: Key for the volcanics that are shown with panning is: basalt (shades of brown/orange); monogenetic basalts; undifferentiated basalts of the Tangihua Complex in Northland Allochthon; arc basalts; arc ring basalts; dacite; andesite (shades of red); basaltic andesite; rhyolite (ignimbrite is lighter shades of violet); plutonic; White shading is selected caldera features.; Clicking on the rectangle icon enables full window and mouse-over with volcano name/wikilink and ages before present.
- Location within New Zealand Location within North Island

Geography
- Location: Bay of Plenty, North Island, New Zealand
- Coordinates: 37°17′S 176°15′E
- Area: 13 km^{2} (5.0 sq mi)
- Highest elevation: 355 m (1165 ft)

Administration
- New Zealand

Demographics
- Population: 4

Mayor Island / Tūhua is a dormant shield volcano located 26 km (16 mi) off the Bay of Plenty coast of New Zealand's North Island. It covers 13 km^{2} (5 sq mi).

== Geography ==
The island is quite steep along its coast and rises to 355 metres (1,165 ft) above sea level. The closest major port entrance is at Tauranga, 35 km (22 mi) away to the southeast and it is 26 km (16 mi) from the Bay of Plenty coast. A saddle about 75 metres (246 ft) deep separates it from the North Island, while the other side of the volcano rises from the seafloor some 400–500 metres (1,312–1,640 ft) beneath the waves. Approximately 18,000 years ago during the Last Glacial Maximum when sea levels were over 100 metres (330 ft) lower than present day levels, Mayor Island / Tūhua was connected to the rest of New Zealand. Sea levels began to rise 7,000 years ago, separating Mayor Island / Tūhua from the mainland. Hot springs may be found on the island's northern side, and there are two small crater lakes, Lake Aroarotamahine (Green Lake) and Lake Te Paritu (Black Lake). These lie within the calderas formed in explosive eruptions.

=== Geology ===
Mayor Island is characterised as a peralkaline volcano and has exhibited a wide range of eruptive styles, including lava fountains, Strombolian explosions, extrusion of lava domes, phreatomagmatic explosions, Plinian falls and ignimbrite. It is the largest and most complex volcano located in the southwest margin of the 128 edifice Tūhua volcanic field which covers at least 510 km^{2} (200 sq mi) of the ocean floor. This field is a polygenetic volcanic field, although up to 55 of the volcanoes are likely monogenetic, having only erupted once.

Three caldera forming events have occurred named, C1 at 36 thousand years BP, C2, perhaps a gradual collapse, at about 9,200 years BP and C3 as a VEI 5 event at 7,600 ± 100 years BP.

The most recent lava flows were historically dated by appearance at between 500 and 1,000 years old, however radiocarbon dating of lake sediments is consistent with volcanic activity destroying pre-existing vegetation about a thousand years earlier than this.

The Tūhua Caldera formed in the >1 km^{3} (0.24 cu mi) eruptive volume C3 event that occurred at 5650 ±100 BCE and is also a partial collapse crater. It is 2.2 km (1.4 mi) by 2.5 km (1.6 mi) in size. The Tuhua Tephra is quite distinctive and due to it having two dispersion patterns has been found in the Auckland area where it is up to 7 cm (2.8 in) thick, at Rotorua up to 10 cm (3.9 in) thick and Lake Waikaremoana where it is 4 cm (1.6 in) thick, making it useful as a mid-Holocene marker horizon. It has also been characterised from multiple sea bed cores off the East coast from the Havre trough off the Bay of Plenty to the southern North Island off Cape Turnagain. Te Paritu Tephra is assigned to a Mayor Island eruption but the full recent significant eruptive sequence required sea cores as prevailing winds are off land. In summary recent eruptions are:

Mayor Island eruptions
Phases	Tephra/eruption name(s)	Date before present (ka BP)	Comment
Early cone building phase		from ~150	Consistently rhyolitic peralkaline eruptives, with two large and complex lava shields at north-east and south-west of island. includes during period Orongatea pumice cone and Pre-Rotoiti lava which are presently poorly constrained in time.
Early cone building phase	NE lava shield	147	
Early cone building phase	-	131	Te Araata Lavas
Early cone building phase	-	118	Te Araata Lavas
Early cone building phase	Oturu pumice	55	
Early cone building phase	M1	86.3	As far north as Auckland and marine deposits
Early cone building phase	Oturu pumice	55	
Early cone building phase		to 55	
Pre-caldera phase		from 55	Up to 5 explosive episodes of Strombolian to sub-Plinian/Plinian scale and multiple small scale flank eruptions
Pre-caldera phase	Post Rotoiti lavas	46	
Pre-caldera phase	M2	45	Tephra
Pre-caldera phase	-	44 ± 20	Lava flow
Pre-caldera phase	M3	40.5 ± 5	Tephra and lava flow
Pre-caldera phase	M4 (Mayor Island)	37.4	Tephra
Pre-caldera phase		to 36	
Inter-caldera phase		from 36	
Inter-caldera phase	-	36	Rim lavas and Upper Taratimi tephras
Inter-caldera phase	Paratao lava	33	
Inter-caldera phase	Opo Bay lava and tuff ring	25.4	
Inter-caldera phase	Ruamata lava and tuff ring	24	
Inter-caldera phase	M5	22.2	
Inter-caldera phase	-	17.36	Pyroclastic cone, Edifice 2 and Turanganui lavas,
Inter-caldera phase	Te Paritu Tephra	17	
Inter-caldera phase		to 14.2	
Caldera C2 phase		from 14.2	
Caldera C2 phase	M6	14.2	
Caldera C2 phase	-	14	land tephra layer
Caldera C2 phase	-	11.5	marine tephra layer
Caldera C2 phase	Caldera C2 lavas	9.2	includes dome and splatter lava eruptions
Caldera C2 phase	Upper Taumou Pa lava	9.2	
Caldera C2 phase	Pupuke maar macrotephra	8.7	
Caldera C2 phase		to 8.7	
Caldera C3 phase	M7 (Tuhua)	7.6 ± 1	VEI 5
Post C3 volcanism		from 7.6	
Post C3 volcanism	-	2.898 ± 82	C3 lavas
Post C3 volcanism	-	2.4	Tarawakoura, Lake Te Paritu core
Post C3 volcanism	-	2.223 ± 60	Tarawakoura, Lake Te Paritu core

The tephra can contain a distinctive purple crystal mineral tuhualite (Na,K)Fe_{2}Si_{6}O_{15} which the island's volcano was only known source of, until 2016.

==== Risks ====
The island would likely be sterilised in a major pyroclastic eruption as last occurred about 7,000 years ago, although a small eruption could be confined within the caldera. Tsunami activity and ash affecting the Bay of Plenty are possible with initial vent clearing and ash falls toward the major cities of the northern half of the North island being most likely in summer, with economic disruption to especially ports and airports. Large ash fall over land would devastate agriculture and ecosystems for some time due to fluorosis and chlorine poisoning as happened after the 1783 eruption at Laki, in Iceland. Usually however the ash fall will be away from land. However it has been estimated that a worse case tsunami could be 35 m (115 ft) high when it reached Bay of Plenty coastal resorts and the city of Tauranga with possibly only 30 minutes warning. Most of the infrastructure of these coastal towns is less than 15 m (49 ft) above sea level so is at risk of complete destruction.

== History ==
Tūhua is the ancestral home of Te Urungawera, hapū of Te Whānau a Tauwhao within the iwi of Ngāi Te Rangi. The island is considered special by Māori (the indigenous people of New Zealand) partly because of the presence of black obsidian, a volcanic glass created by the rapid cooling of silica-rich lava, prized as a cutting tool. The obsidian was called Tūhua by Māori, who called the island by the same name. Over 80% of obsidian excavated from Matakawau on Great Mercury Island had been sourced from Tūhua. Several pa sites are known on the island, the final of which was inhabited until 1901.

Captain James Cook called it the Mayor when he sighted it on 3 November 1769, in recognition of the Lord Mayor's Day to be held in London a few days later.

The Ngāti Whakaue led a military expedition to the island in 1842, after a tribesman was killed by the Whanau a Tauwhao, a hapu of Ngāi Te Rangi

== Uses and recreation ==
The island, since 2014 has been administered by the Tūhua Trust Board, and access is restricted. Since 1953 it has been a wildlife refuge. The area of the Bay of Plenty around the island is renowned for game fishing, with marlin, mako sharks, and swordfish all inhabiting the surrounding waters. Since 1990 the island itself, has no longer been the base for big game fishing. Some of the waters close to the island, since 1993, are a small marine reserve. There are several tramping tracks around the island, and it is also popular with divers. A small number of holiday houses are located in Opo Bay on the south coast of the island, along with a camp ground and a few rental cabins. The 2001 census showed a population of three, after zero in 1996 and 12 in 1991 (all figures randomised for privacy on a Base-3 system). There are no permanent residents presently but the island is usually occupied during the summer months.

== See also ==
- List of islands of New Zealand
- List of volcanoes in New Zealand
