= Grüner See (Hundelshausen) =

Lake in Hesse, Germany

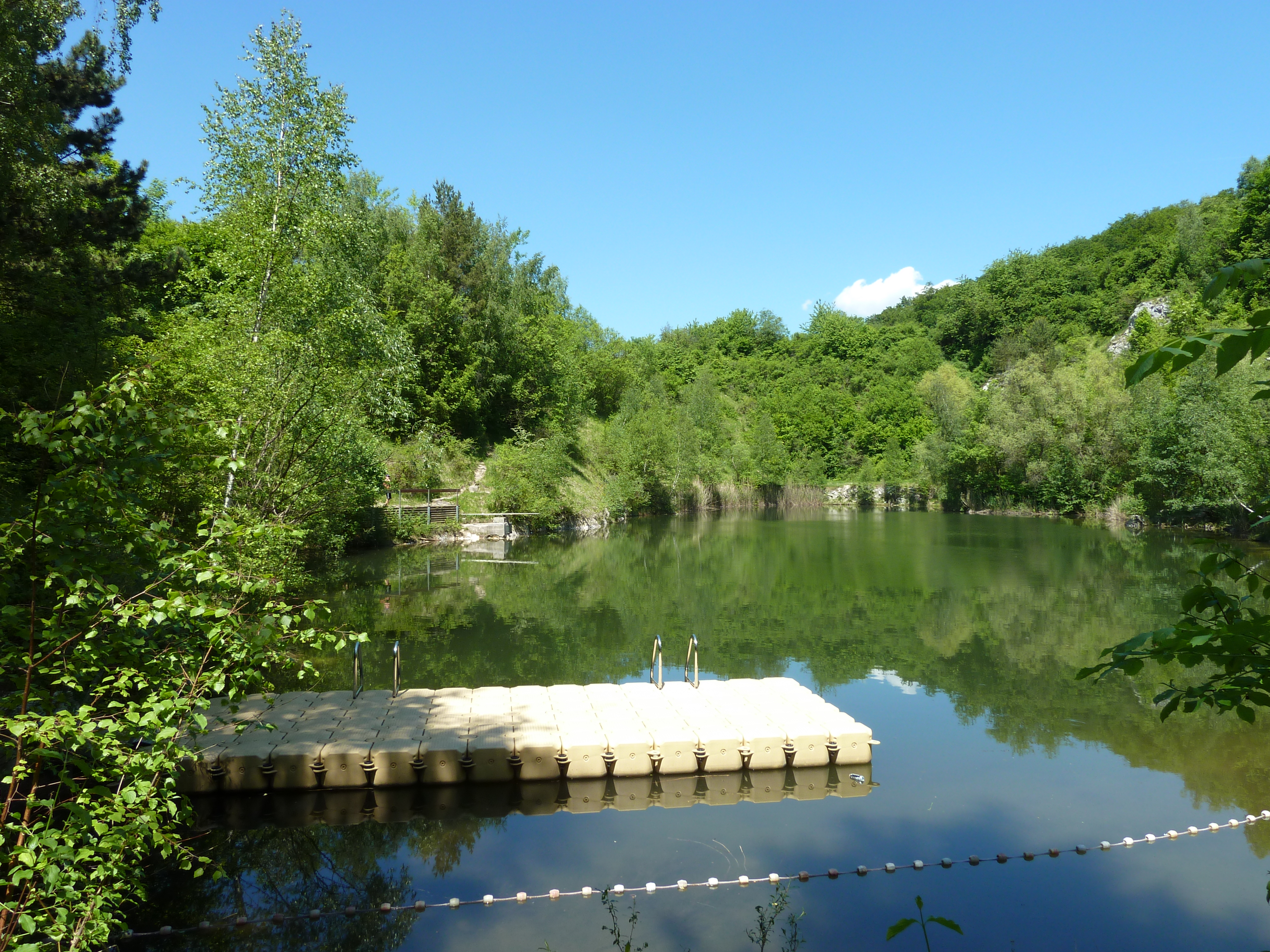
- Green lake near Witzenhausen-Hundelshausen, North Hesse. Former gypsum quarry, today swimming lake

- Location within Hesse
- Location: Hundelshausen, Hesse
- Coordinates: 51°17′44″N 9°51′15″E
- Basin countries: Germany
- Surface area: ca. 5,000 m^{2} (54,000 sq ft)
- Surface elevation: 220 m (720 ft)

Grüner See is a lake in Hundelshausen, Hesse, Germany. At an elevation of 220 metres (720 ft), its surface area is ca. 5,000 m^{2} (1.2 acres).

== Origin ==
The Green Lake, which is partially surrounded by steep slopes, was formed in 1940 when an abandoned open-cast mining pit from a gypsum quarry filled with groundwater, precipitation, and surface water. Its green color is due to its abundance of phytoplankton.
