= Grünsee (Zermatt) =

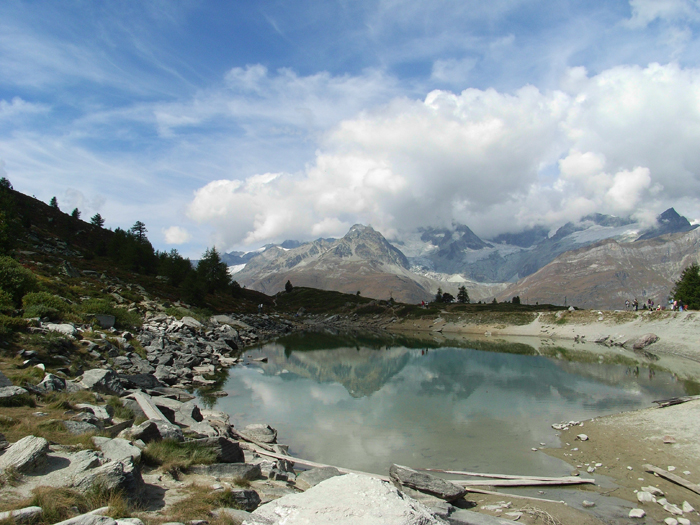
- Grünsee

- Location within Canton of Valais Location within Switzerland
- Interactive map of Grünsee
- Location: Switzerland
- Coordinates: 46.0056°N 7.7857°E
- Type: lake

The Grünsee ("Green Lake") is a small lake near Zermatt, Switzerland, which is fed by the Findel Glacier. It is quite remote and is only accessible by foot (or off-road bike), a small hub of the many footpaths in the area. There is a small hamlet nearby of the same name.
