= Pflerscher Bach =

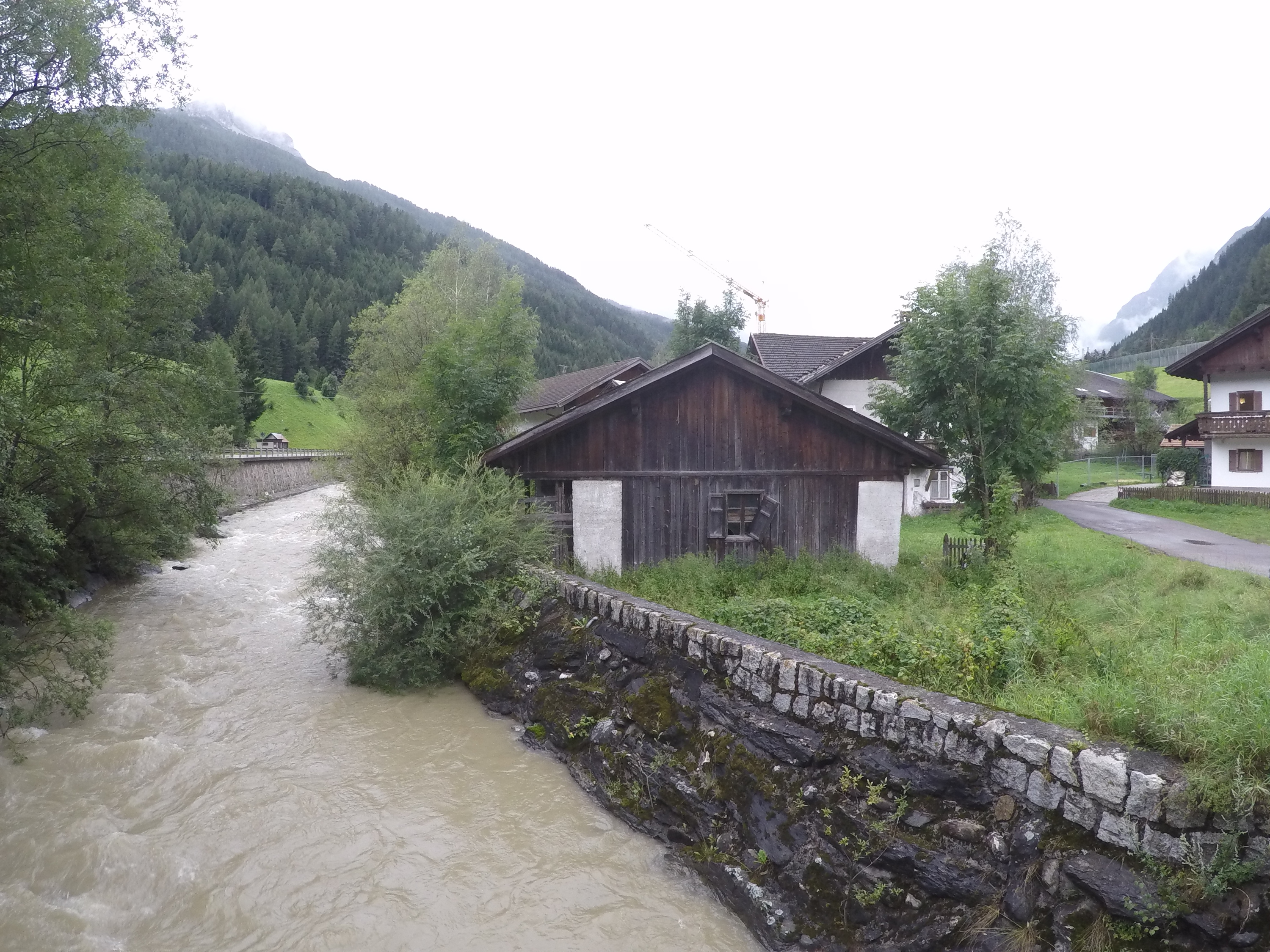
- Pflerscherbach at Vallming

Location
- Country: Italy

Physical characteristics
- Mouth: Eisack
  - coordinates: 46°56′10″N 11°26′28″E
- Length: 15 km (9.3 mi)
- Basin size: 75 km^{2} (29 sq mi)

Basin features
- Progression: Eisack→ Adige→ Adriatic Sea

The Pflerscher Bach is a stream in South Tyrol, Italy. It flows into the Eisack in Gossensaß.

== See also ==
- Stubensee
