= Grünsee (Pflersch) =

Grünsee Lago Verde
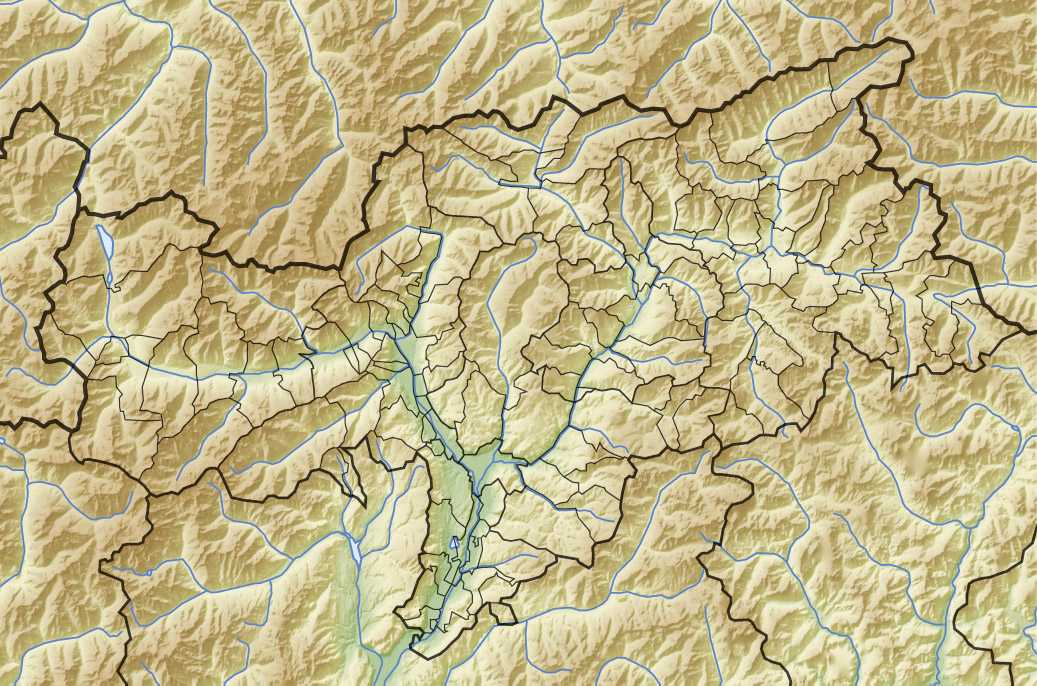
- Location within South Tyrol
- Location: Pflersch Tal, South Tyrol (Italy)
- Coordinates: 46°57′52″N 11°16′58″E
- Type: Mountain lake
- Primary outflows: Fernerbach also: Pflerscher Bach (subterranean)
- Basin countries: Italy
- Surface area: 7,070 m^{2} (76,100 sq ft)
- Surface elevation: 1,680 m (5,510 ft)

The Grünsee (Italian: Lago Verde) is a lake and protected natural monument in South Tyrol. It lies 1,680 metres above sea level in the westernmost part of the Pflersch Valley, the left side valley of the Eisack river below the Brenner Pass.

== Geography ==
The lake was created as remnant, when the Feuerstein Ferner had drawn itself. It gives fish such as trout and carp a protected, untouched living space. The lake drains subterraneously via the Fernerbach. As a typical mountain lake the water is very clean (A-grade quality). It remains cold even in summer.

== Access ==
The lake can only be reached by foot. There is road access to the Ochsen alpine hut about 11 km east. The road is not accessible for cars in winter.
