= 1890 House Museum =

- U.S. National Register of Historic Places
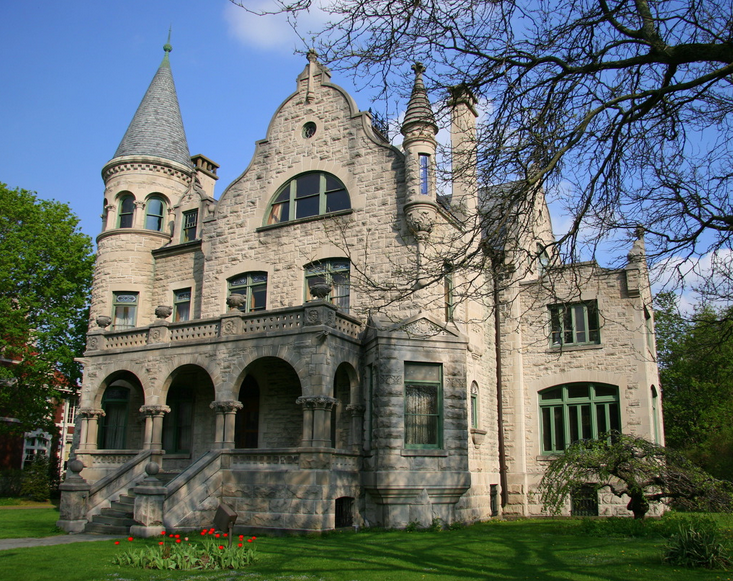

- Location within New York Location within the United States
- Location: 37 Tompkins St., Cortland, New York
- Coordinates: 42°35′46.1″N 76°10′56″W
- Built: 1890
- Architect: Samuel B. Reed
- Architectural style: Chateauesque
- Website: the1890House.org
- NRHP reference No.: 75001179 (original); 82001116 (increase)
- Added to NRHP: March 18, 1975 (original); November 17, 1982 (increase)

The 1890 House Museum is a historic house located on Tompkins Street in Cortland, New York. It was built in 1890 for industrialist Chester F. Wickwire (1843–1910), and was designed by architect Samuel B. Reed. The house is a mirror image sister house of an earlier mansion built for circus manager James Anthony Bailey in Harlem, New York City. The beautiful mosaic stained glass windows throughout the home were created by Henry F. Belcher. Chester Wickwire lived in the home from 1890 until his death in 1910. He made his fortune by founding and managing the Wickwire Brothers Company in Cortland, NY, which produced wire products such as horse muzzles, seed spreaders, insect screens, and similar products for rural Americans.

In 1974, the 1890 House Museum formed a part of the Tompkins Street District's listing on the National Register of Historic Places, and in 1975, the 1890 House became a museum after campaigning from Cortland County leaders.

== History ==
=== First Wickwire family ===
==== Family ====
Chester, his wife Ardell, and their sons Charles and Frederic moved into the house on June 1, 1890. After Chester's death in 1910, Ardell Wickwire lived in the house until her death in 1915.

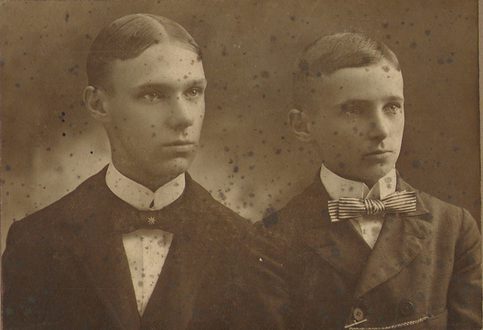
Charles Wickwire and Frederic Wickwire

Chester was born in 1843 to Raymond and Elmira (Greenman) Wickwire. The farming family lived in McGrawville, NY, now known as McGraw, New York. When Chester was age nineteen, the family moved to the city of Cortland to open a grocery store on Main Street, which was managed by Chester and his father Raymond at the outset. Raymond soon died, and Chester's brother Chauncey then took over his father's duties. When Chauncey died at age 27, Chester's other brother, Theodore, stepped in to assist, and they changed the store from a grocery store to a hardware store. Chester married Ardell Rouse from Greene, New York on October 2, 1866. They had three children, Raymond, Charles and Frederic. Raymond died at age five of scarlet fever in 1878; his two younger brothers followed their father into the family business.

==== Margaret Stack ====
In addition to the Wickwire family, many servants lived at the mansion. One servant, a twenty one year old Irish cook named Margaret Stack, immigrated from Athea, County Limerick, Ireland in 1904. She arrived on Ellis Island with two of her siblings. Stack worked at the house from 1904 to 1911, after which she moved back to Ireland with her husband, a fellow Irish immigrant named John Lane, who she met in Cortland. Visitors to the house can view Margaret Stack's bedroom and learn about the lives of Victorian servants.

=== Second Wickwire family ===
After Ardell's death in 1915, the house lay dormant for eight years until Frederic moved in with his wife Marian, a local poet. Frederic and Marian made several renovations to the house, reflecting the style and tastes of the 1920s.

Frederic died in 1929, and Marian later remarried local judge C. Leonard O’Connor. Marian Goodrich Wickwire O’Connor outlived her second husband as well, and lived in the house until 1973.

== Wickwire Brothers Factory ==
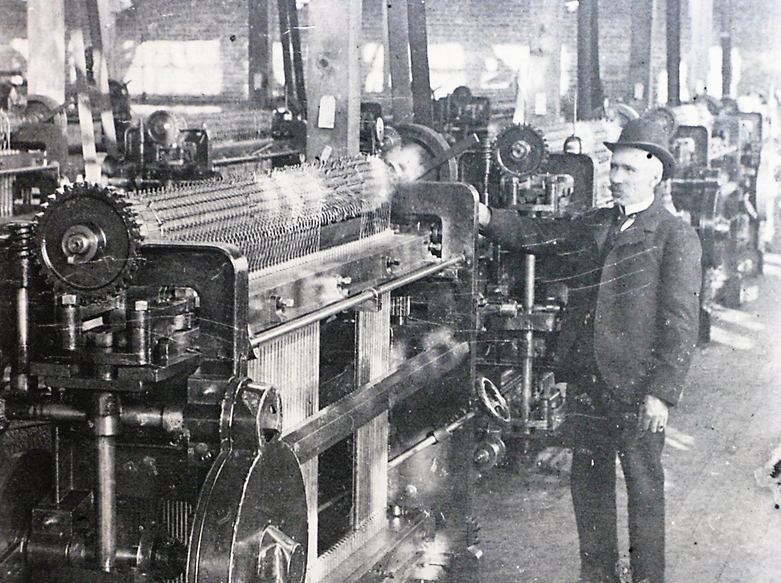
Chester Wickwire in the Wickwire Brothers Factory

In 1873, Chester Wickwire received a carpet loom in trade at his hardware store, which he adapted to weave wire instead. In the process, he discovered a cheaper method for manufacturing wire products, and after outgrowing their store on Main Street in Cortland, he and his brother, Theodore, opened their own factory, which they called the Wickwire Brothers Company. By 1883, they had become the second largest producer of wire goods in the United States, thanks in part to Chester's patents.

The Wickwires hired many immigrants, mainly from Germany, Italy, Ukraine, Russia, and Ireland. The employees worked on an assembly line, which proved to be dangerous. Though Chester was a fair and well-liked factory owner, the factory did have some difficult times, and saw seven industrial accidents between 1887 and 1897. In February 1888, a 14-year-old boy lost his toes and part of his foot. In April 1888, one man had his fingers mangled in the gears of a loom.

== Museum today ==
The museum offers guided and self-guided tours for visitors, who can view several rooms on three floors, as well as a cupola. The 1890 House offers monthly educational programs and special events, and you can view their YouTube series called WickWired, focusing on the Victorian age and the lives of the Wickwire Family.

== Gallery ==
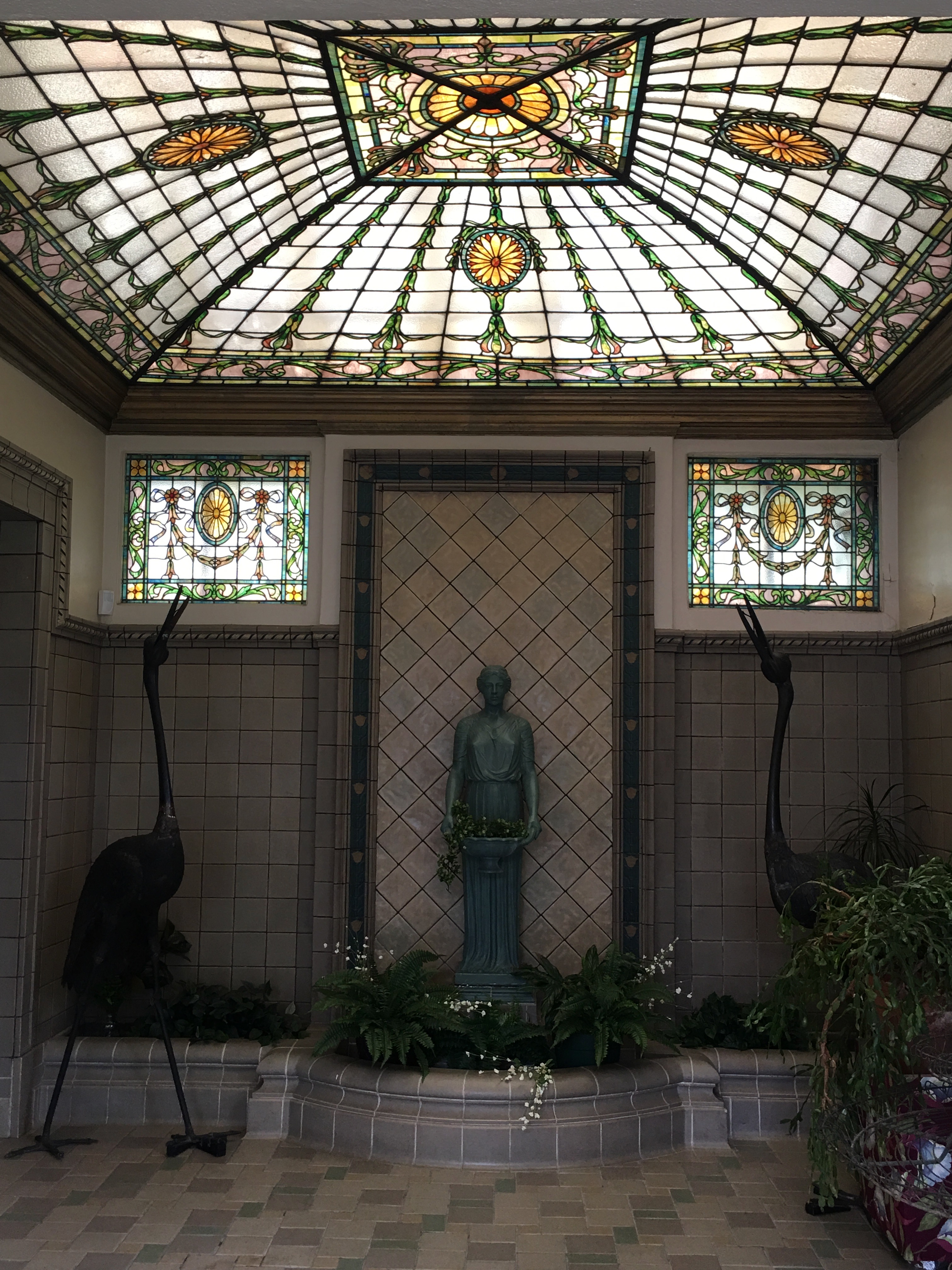
Fernery & Sun Parlor of the 1890 House

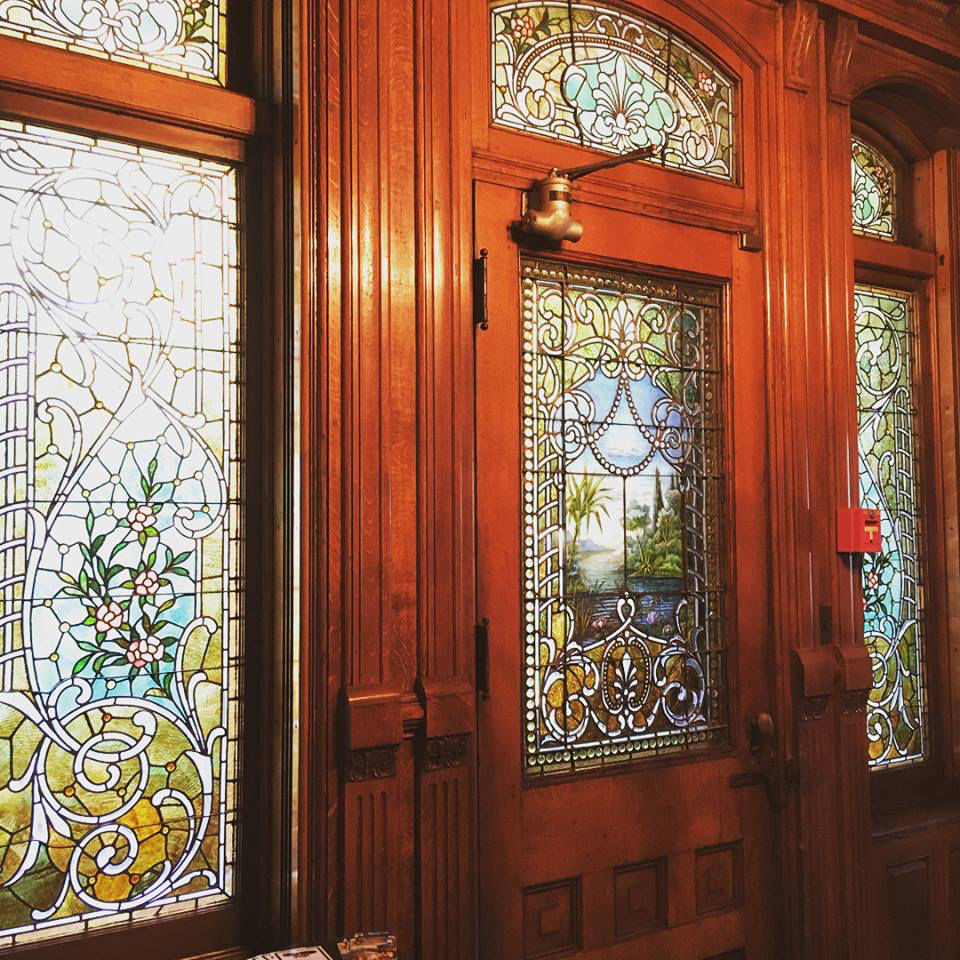
Stained glass side door of the 1890 House

== See also ==
- Tompkins Street–Main Street Historic District
