= Sugar Hill, Manhattan =

Historic district in Manhattan, New York

- Sugar Hill Historic District
- U.S. National Register of Historic Places
- U.S. Historic district
- New York City Landmark
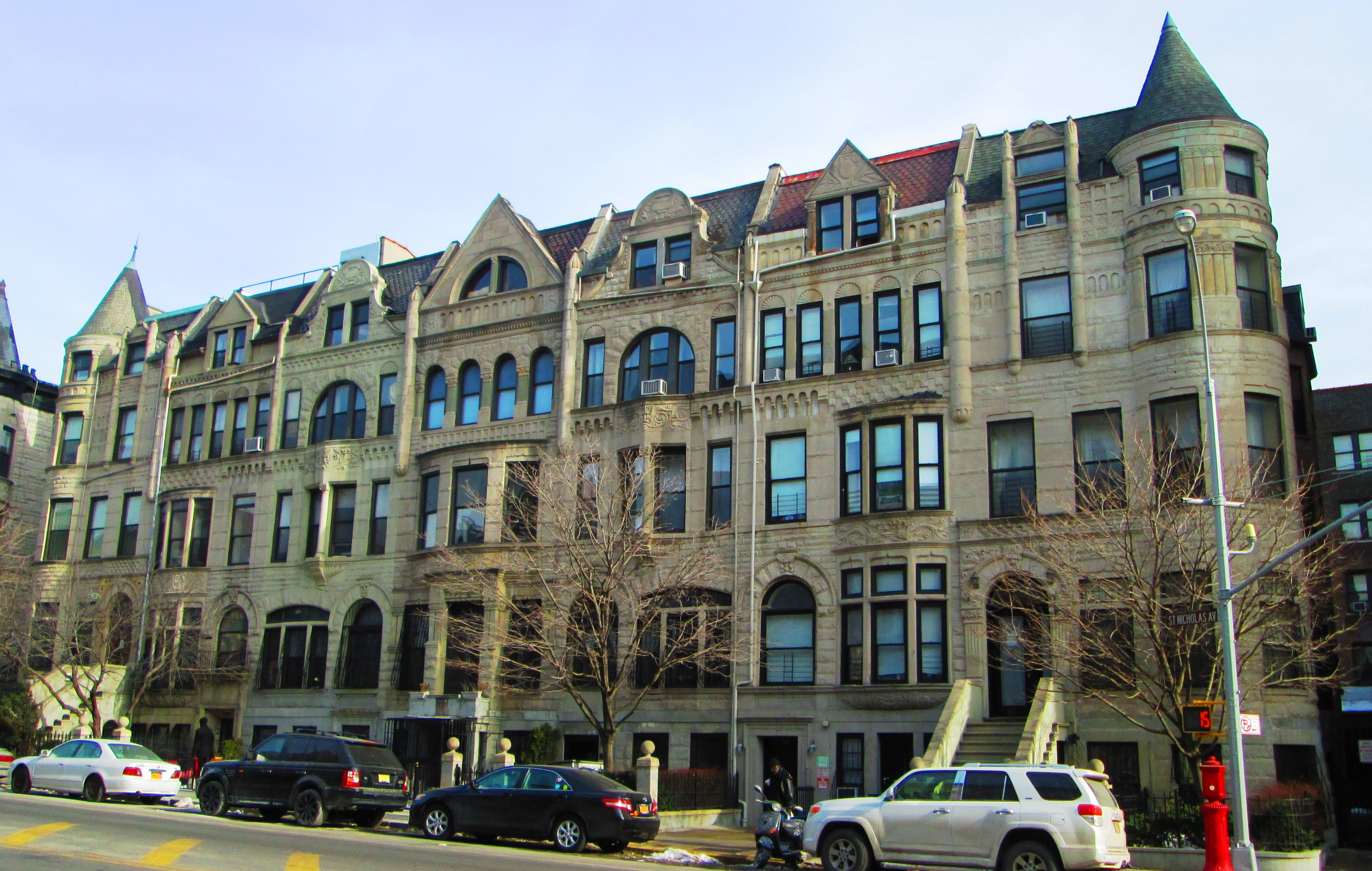
- row houses at 718-730 St. Nicholas Avenue (2014)
- Location: Roughly bounded by W. 155th St., 127th St., Edgecombe Ave. and Amsterdam Ave. Manhattan, New York
- Coordinates: 40°49′38″N 73°56′36″W
- Area: 75 acres (30 ha)
- Built: 1883-1930
- Architects: Richard S. Rosenstock, Arthur Bates Jennings, Frederick P. Dinkelberg, Henri Fouchaux, Theodore Minot Clark, Neville & Bagge, Schwartz & Gross, George F. Pelham, Horace Ginsbern, C. P. H. Gilbert, Clarence True, John P. Leo, Samuel B. Reed, William Grinnell, William Schickel et al.
- Architectural style: Queen Anne, Romanesque Revival, Renaissance Revival, Beaux-Arts, Neoclassical, Colonial Revival, Gothic Revival, neo-Grec, etc.
- NRHP reference No.: 02000360
- NYCL No.: 2064, 2103–2105

Significant dates
- Added to NRHP: April 11, 2002
- Designated NYCL: Hamilton Heights/Sugar Hill HD: June 27, 2000 extension: October 3, 2001; Hamilton Heights/Sugar Hill Northeast HD: October 23, 2001; Hamilton Heights/Sugar Hill Northwest HD: June 18, 2002

Sugar Hill is a National Historic District in the Harlem and Hamilton Heights neighborhoods of Manhattan, New York City, bounded by West 155th Street to the north, West 127th Street to the south, Edgecombe Avenue to the east, and Amsterdam Avenue to the west. The equivalent New York City Historic Districts are:

- Hamilton Heights/Sugar Hill Historic District and Extension: roughly West 145th to West 150th Street, Edgecombe Avenue to between Convent and Amsterdam Avenues
- Hamilton Heights/Sugar Hill Northeast Historic District: roughly West 151st to West 155th Street, west of St. Nicholas Avenue to between Convent and Amsterdam Avenues
- Hamilton Heights/Sugar Hill Northwest Historic District: roughly West 151st to West 155th Street, east of St. Nicholas Avenue to Edgecombe Avenue

The Federal district was listed on the National Register of Historic Places in 2002. The Federal district has 414 contributing buildings, two contributing sites, three contributing structures, and one contributing object.

== History ==
Sugar Hill got its name in the 1920s when the neighborhood became a popular place for wealthy African Americans to live during the Harlem Renaissance. Reflective of the "sweet life" there, Sugar Hill featured rowhouses in which lived such prominent African Americans as W. E. B. Du Bois, Thurgood Marshall, Adam Clayton Powell Jr., Duke Ellington, Cab Calloway, Walter Francis White, Roy Wilkins, Sonny Rollins and Afro-Puerto Rican Arturo Schomburg.

Langston Hughes wrote about the relative affluence of the neighborhood in his essay "Down Under in Harlem" published in The New Republic in 1944:

Don't take it for granted that all Harlem is a slum. It isn't. There are big apartment houses up on the hill, Sugar Hill, and up by City College – nice high-rent-houses with elevators and doormen, where Canada Lee lives, and W. C. Handy, and the George S. Schuylers, and the Walter Whites, where colored families send their babies to private kindergartens and their youngsters to Ethical Culture School.

Terry Mulligan's 2012 memoir Sugar Hill, Where the Sun Rose Over Harlem is a chronicle of the writer's experiences growing up in the 1950s and 1960s in the neighborhood, where her neighbors included future United States Supreme Court Justice Thurgood Marshall, early rock n' roll legend Frankie Lymon, and New York baseball great Willie Mays.

== Notable buildings ==
Among the many notable buildings in the Sugar Hill area are:

- Nicholas C. and Agnes Benziger House, 345 Edgecombe Avenue (William Schickel, 1890–91) - has also been used as a hospital, nursery and housing for the homeless
- James A. and Ruth M. Bailey House, 10 St. Nicholas Place (Samuel B. Reed, 1886–88) - A Romanesque Revival residence built for James A. Bailey of the Barnum & Bailey Circus
- The Garrison Apartments, 435 Convent Avenue (Neville & Bagge, 1909-1910) - Originally Emsworth Hall, it became a cooperative apartment building in 1929 and is today the oldest continuously operated Black founded, owned, and managed co-op in New York City. Home to many Harlem trailblazers and history makers.
- 14 and 16 St. Nicholas Place (William Grinnell, 1883–84) - Queen Anne style detached frame houses clad in wood shingles
- Fink House, 8 St. Nicholas Place (Richard S. Rosenstock, 1885) - Queen Anne style house, would later be combined with...
- Baiter House, 6 St. Nicholas Place (Theodore G. Stein, 1893–94) - ...and used as a sanitarium, a hospital, a hotel, and a group home
- 713-721 St. Nicholas Avenue (Hugh M. Reynolds, 1890–1891) - Row houses in the Victorian Romanesque Revival style
- 718-730 St. Nicholas Avenue (Arthur Bates Jennings, 1889–1890) - A Romanesque Revival row
- 729 and 731 St. Nicholas Avenue (Theodore Minot Clark, 1886–1886) - two houses faced in Manhattan schist and shingles
- 757-775 St. Nicholas Avenue (Frederick P. Dinkelberg, 1894–1895) - A Renaissance Revival style row which is said to be "among the finest in the district."
- 409 Edgecombe Avenue Apartments (Schwartz & Gross, 1916–1817) - Originally the Colonial Parkway Apartments. Home to Babe Ruth as an infant, Aaron Douglas, Thurgood Marshall, W. E. B. Du Bois, Marvel Cooke, and Jules Bledsoe.
- 555 Edgecombe Avenue. Several noted big band leaders lived here in the 1940s including Count Basie, Andy Kirk, Don Redman, Erskine Hawkins, Benny Carter and Cootie Williams.

== Gallery ==
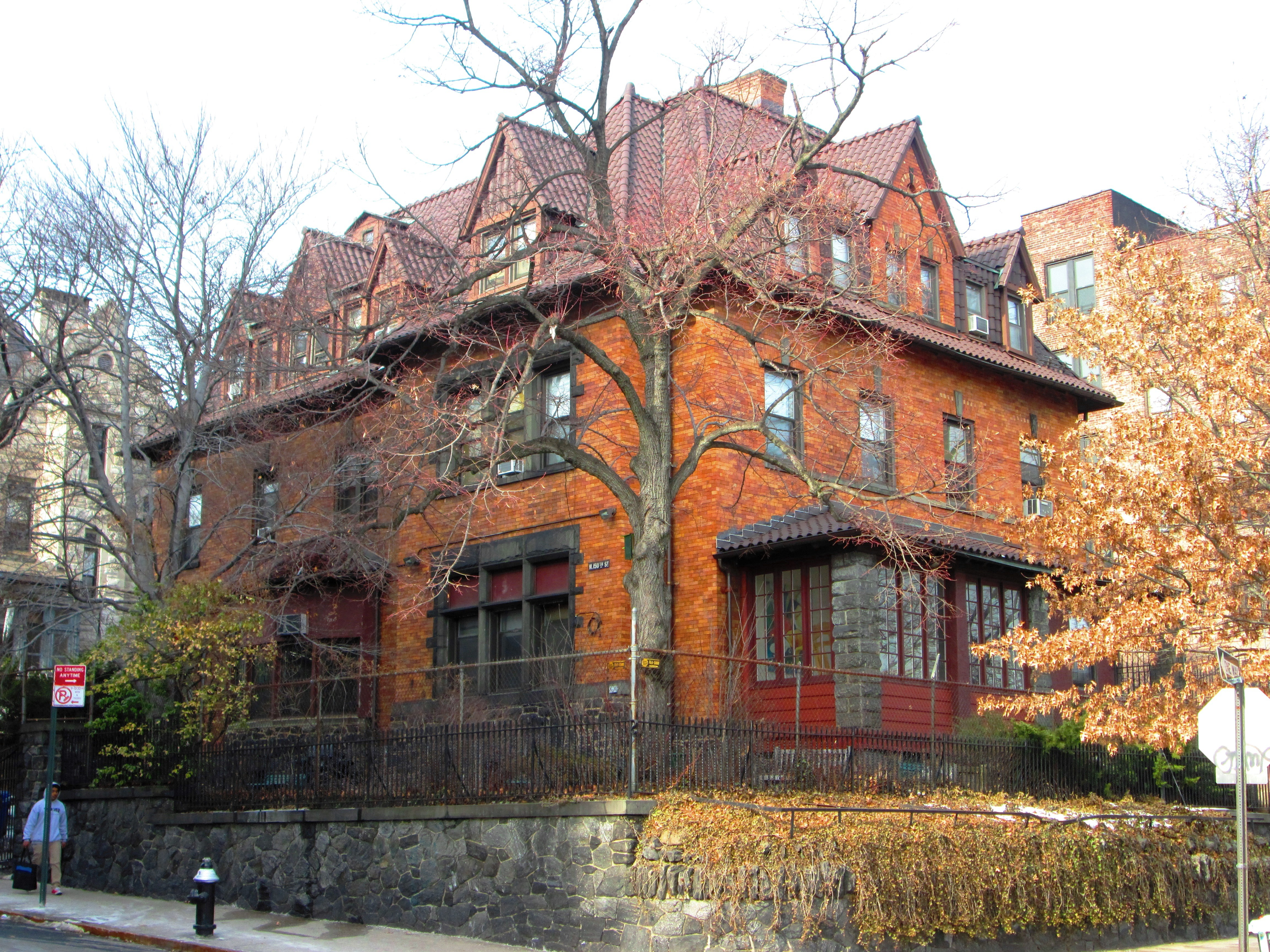
Benziger House

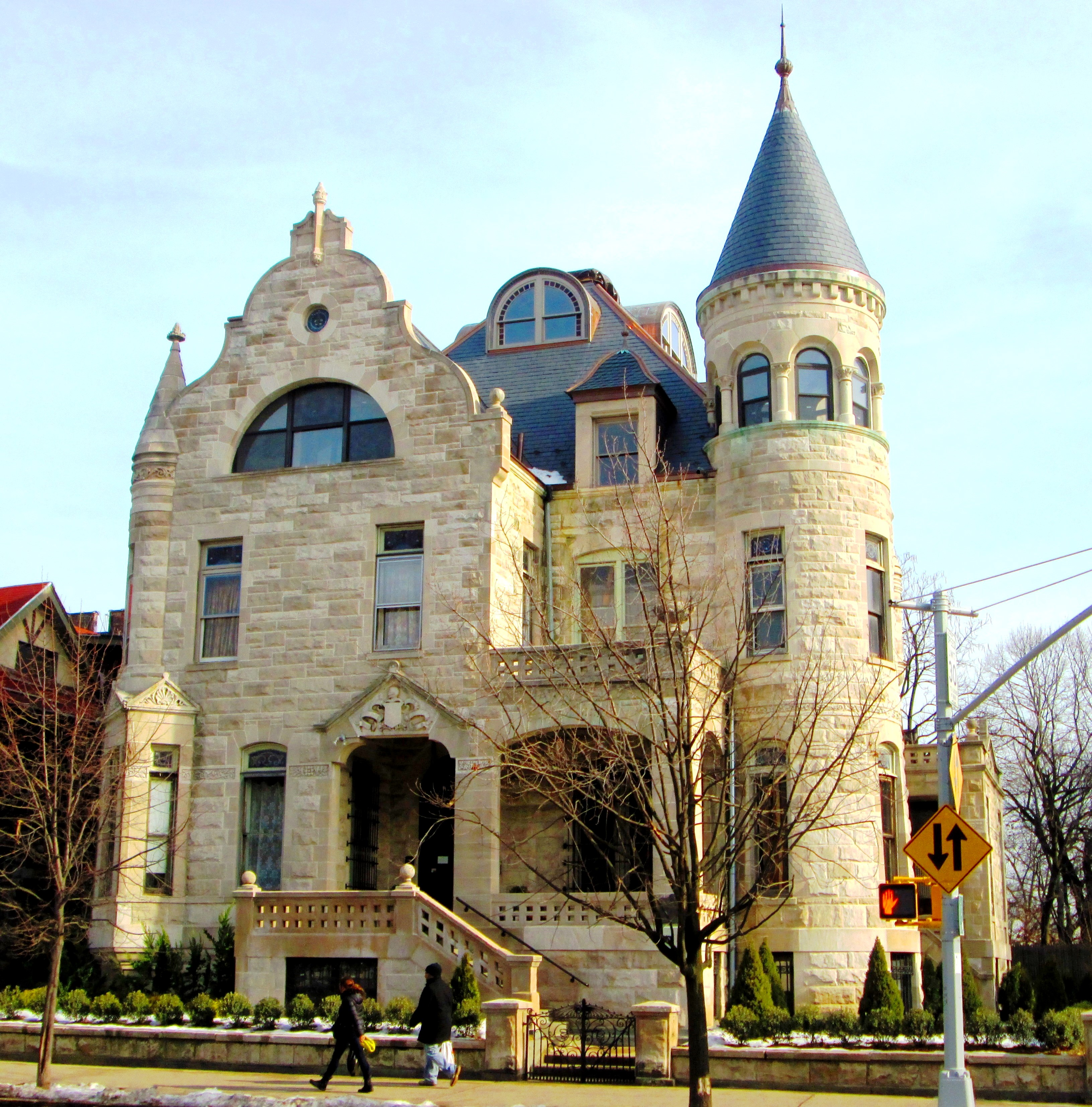
Bailey House

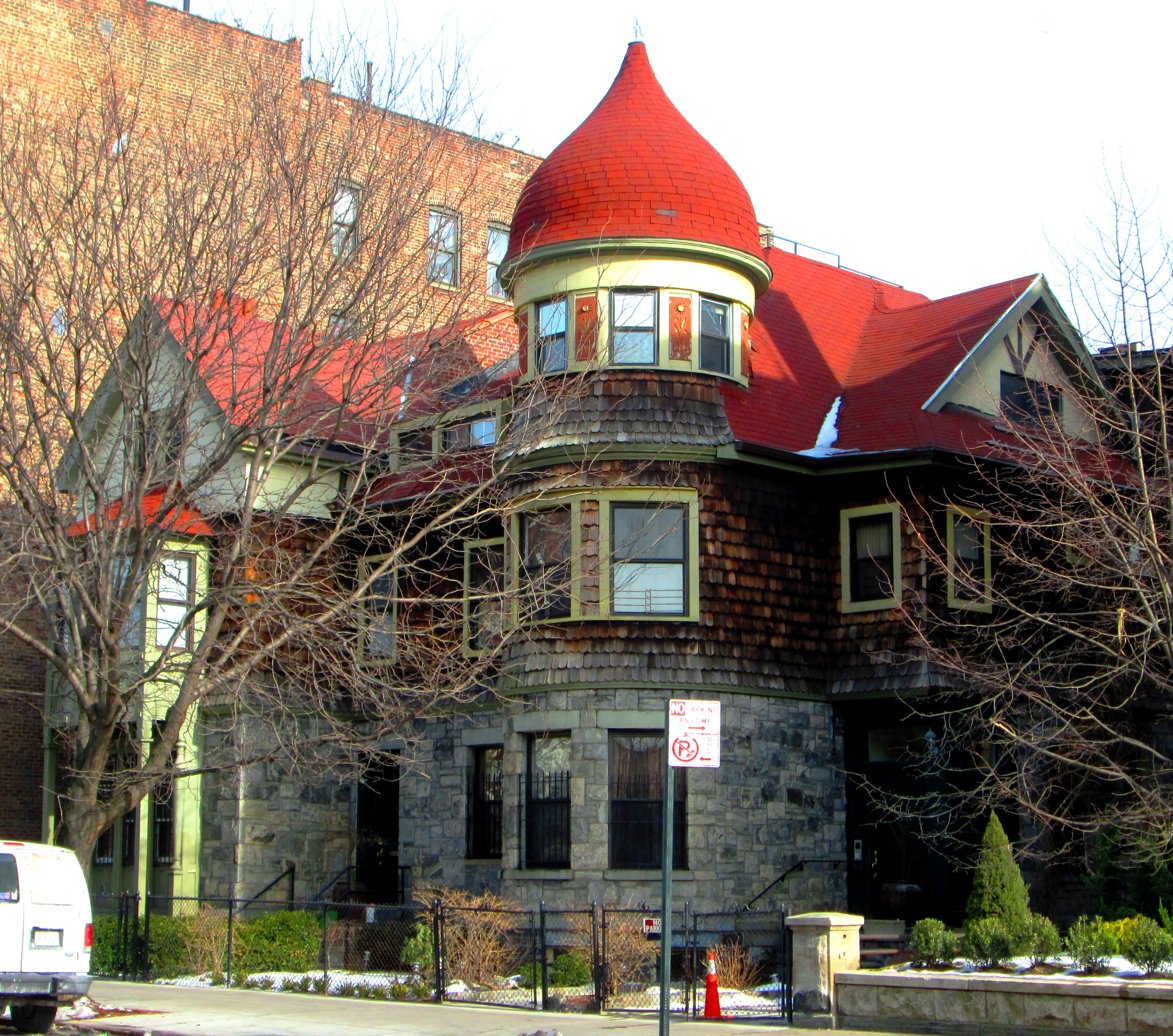
14 (right) and 16 (left) St. Nicholas Place

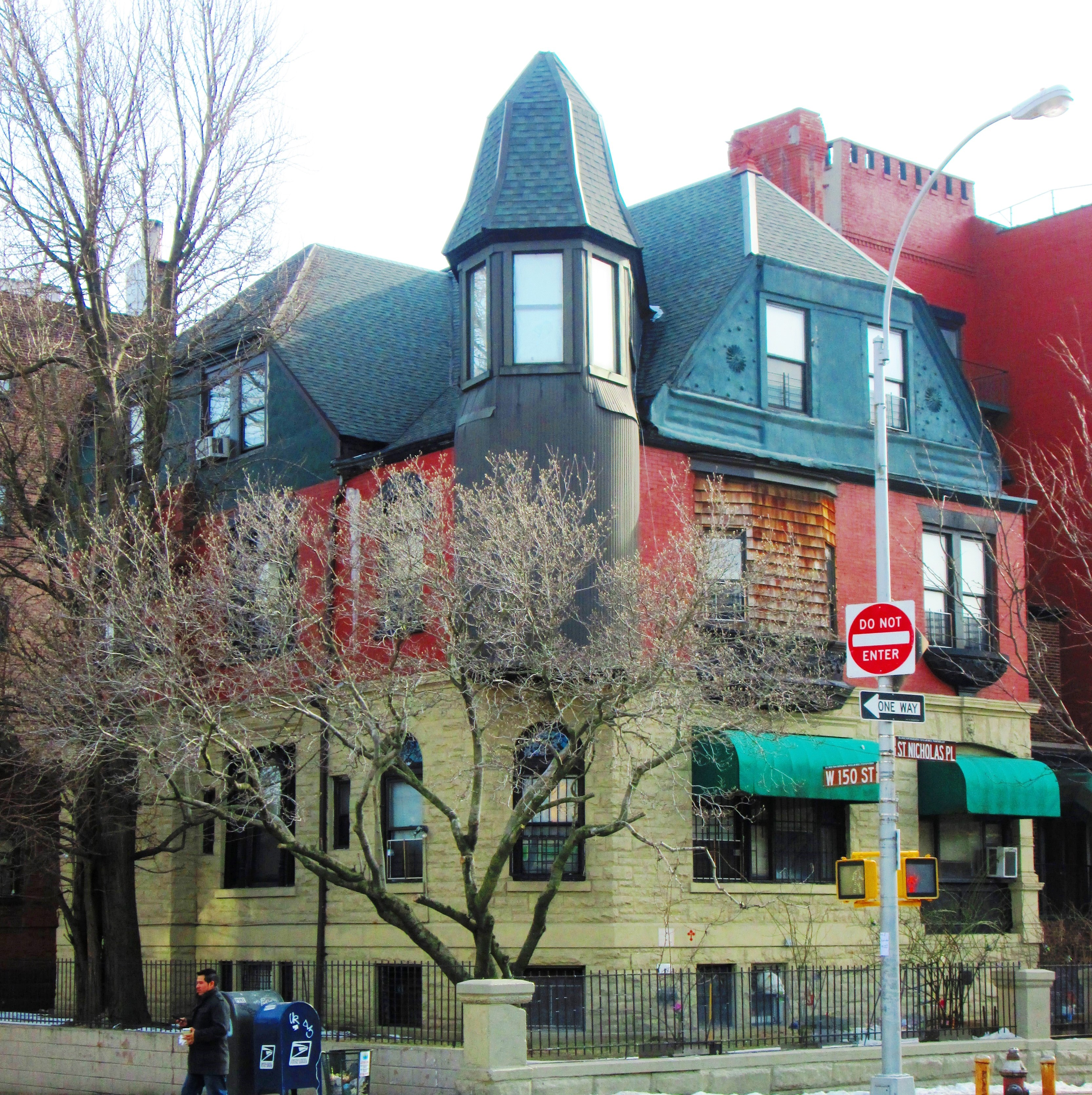
Fink House

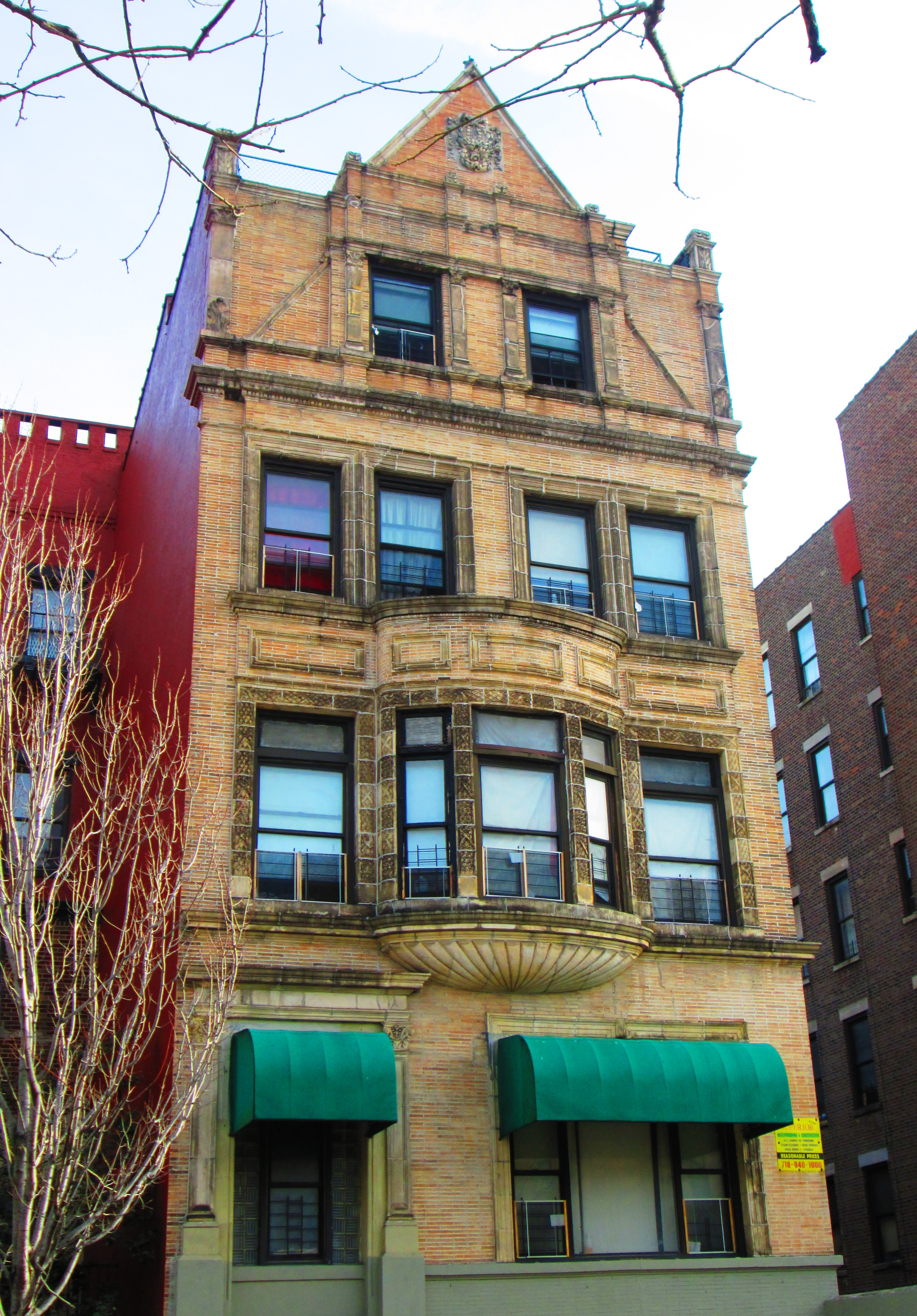
Baiter House

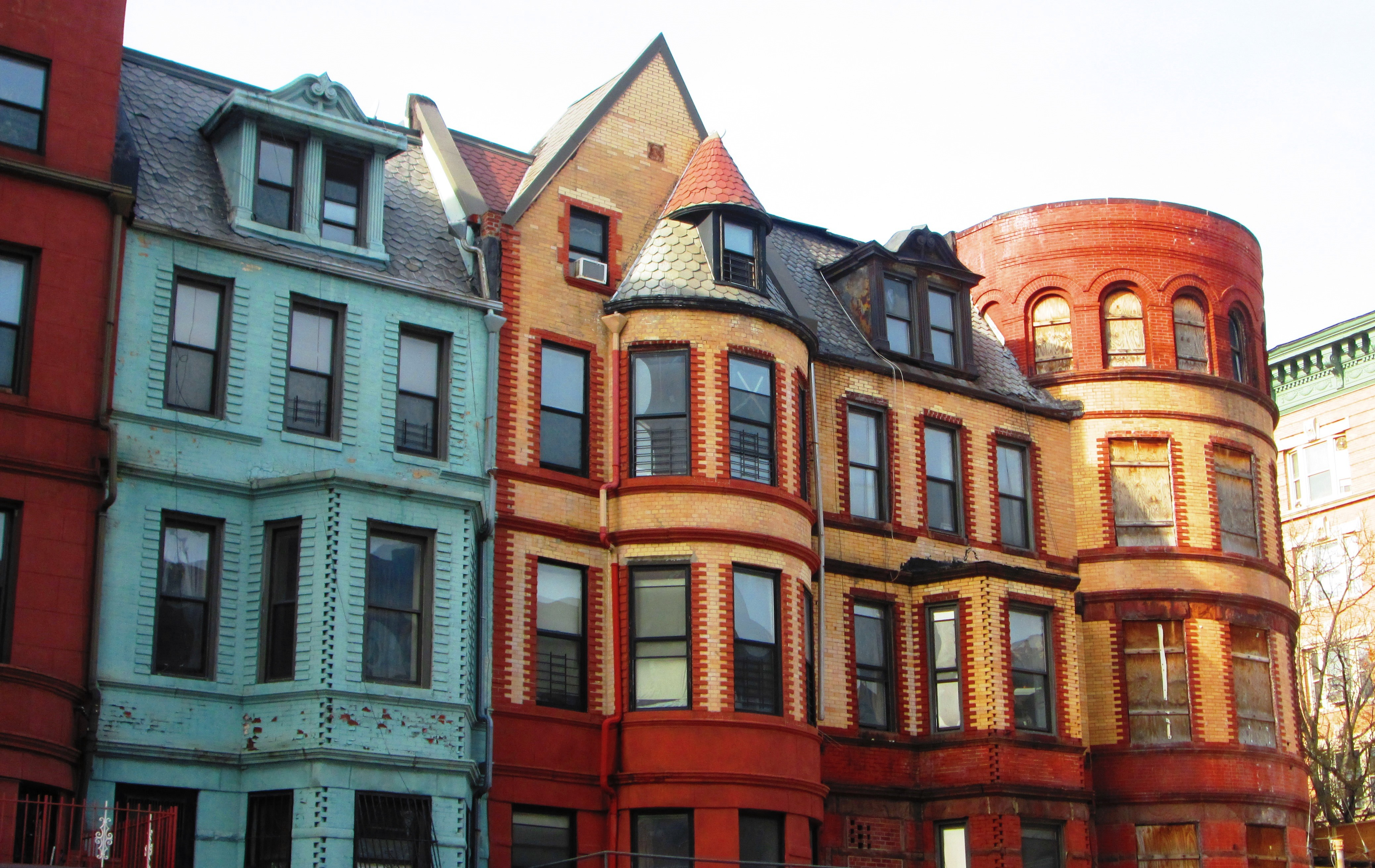
715 (left) - 721 (right) St. Nicholas Avenue

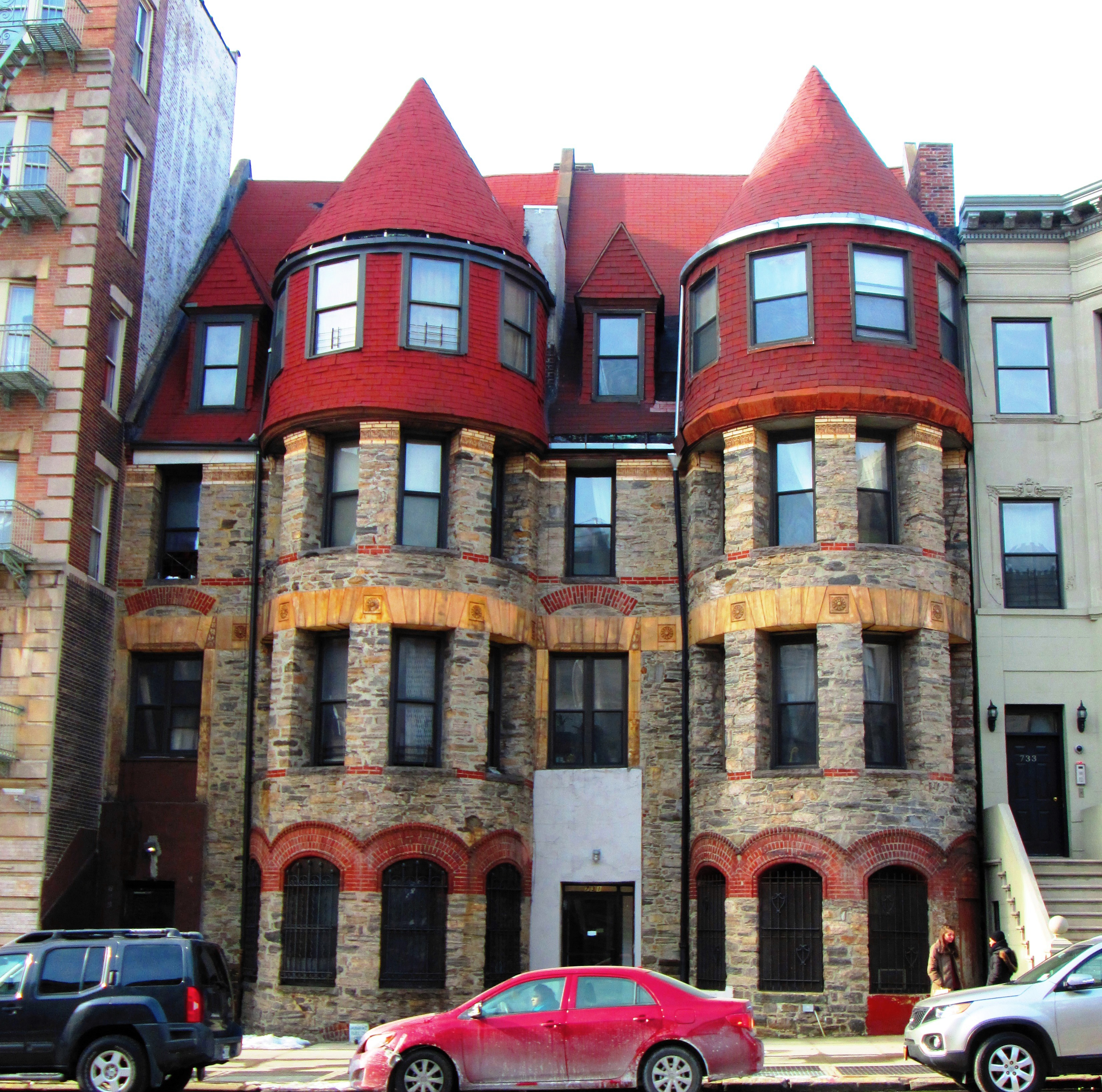
729 and 731 St. Nicholas Avenue

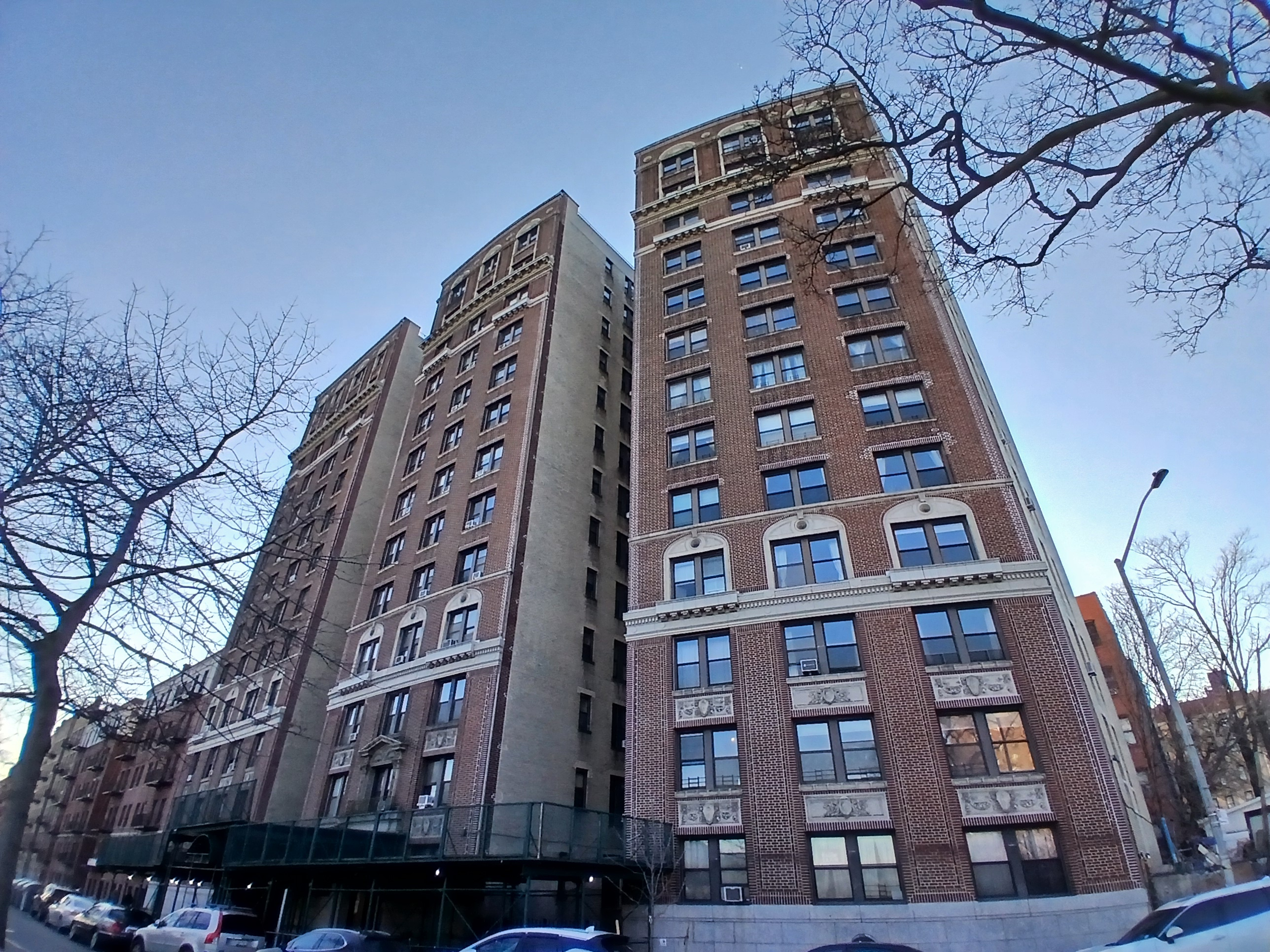
409 Edgecombe Avenue Apartments

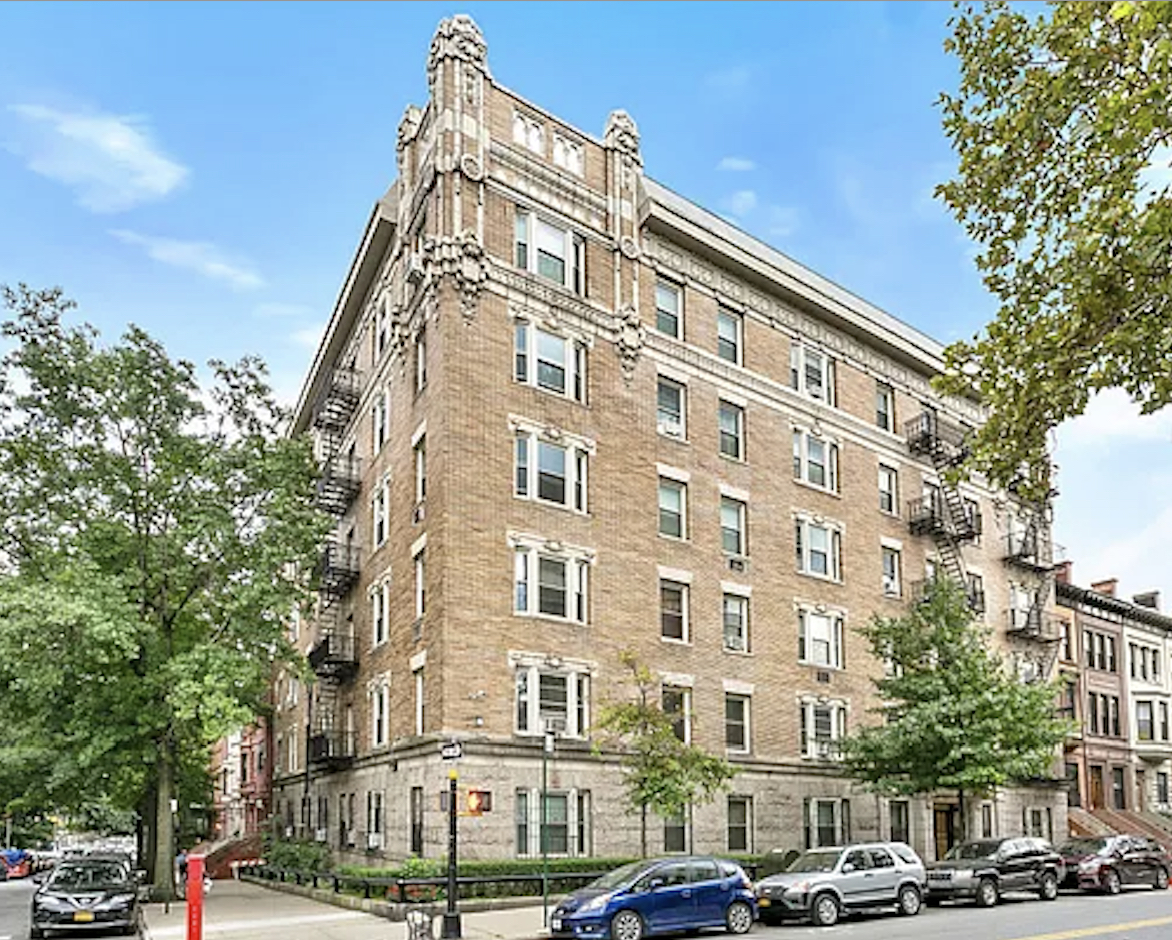
The Garrison Apartments, 435 Convent Avenue

== In popular culture ==
- The Leslie Uggams Show featured a "Sugar Hill" sketch throughout its one-year run in 1969.
- The Sugarhill Gang, the first rap group with a single in the Top 40, took their name from the neighborhood; the band members were actually all from Englewood, New Jersey.
- The 1974 film Claudine, starring Diahann Carroll and James Earl Jones was filmed in the Sugar Hill neighborhood.
- The 1994 film Sugar Hill, about drug dealers in Harlem, stars Wesley Snipes.
- Sugar Hill is mentioned in the lyrics to the jazz standard "Take the 'A' Train" by Billy Strayhorn.
- It is also referred to by rapper AZ's "Sugar Hill" on his album Doe or Die.
- Henry "Red" Allen recorded "Sugar Hill Function", written by Charlie Holmes, on February 18, 1930.
- There is also a song by Rex Stewart and his Fifty-Second Street Stompers – one of the four Duke Ellington small groups – called "Sugar Hill Shim-Sham", which was recorded on July 7, 1937.
- The 1978 film Cindy, a modern retelling of Cinderella set in Harlem, includes a scene at the Sugar Hill Ball.
- American rapper Sugarhill Ddot stage name after Sugarhill neighborhood.

== See also ==
- List of New York City Designated Landmarks in Manhattan above 110th Street
- National Register of Historic Places listings in Manhattan above 110th Street
- Bushman Steps
