= Landrock =

Landrock is a surname. Notable people with the surname include:

- Ernst Heinrich Landrock (1878–1966), German photographer
- Heinrich Landrock (1890–1948), German rower
- Maria Landrock (1923–1992), German actress
- Peter Landrock (born 1948), Danish cryptographer and mathematician

== See also ==
- John Christian and Bertha Landrock Reichert House, in Iowa, United States
