= Cortland Rural Cemetery =

Cemetery in Cortland, New York, U.S.

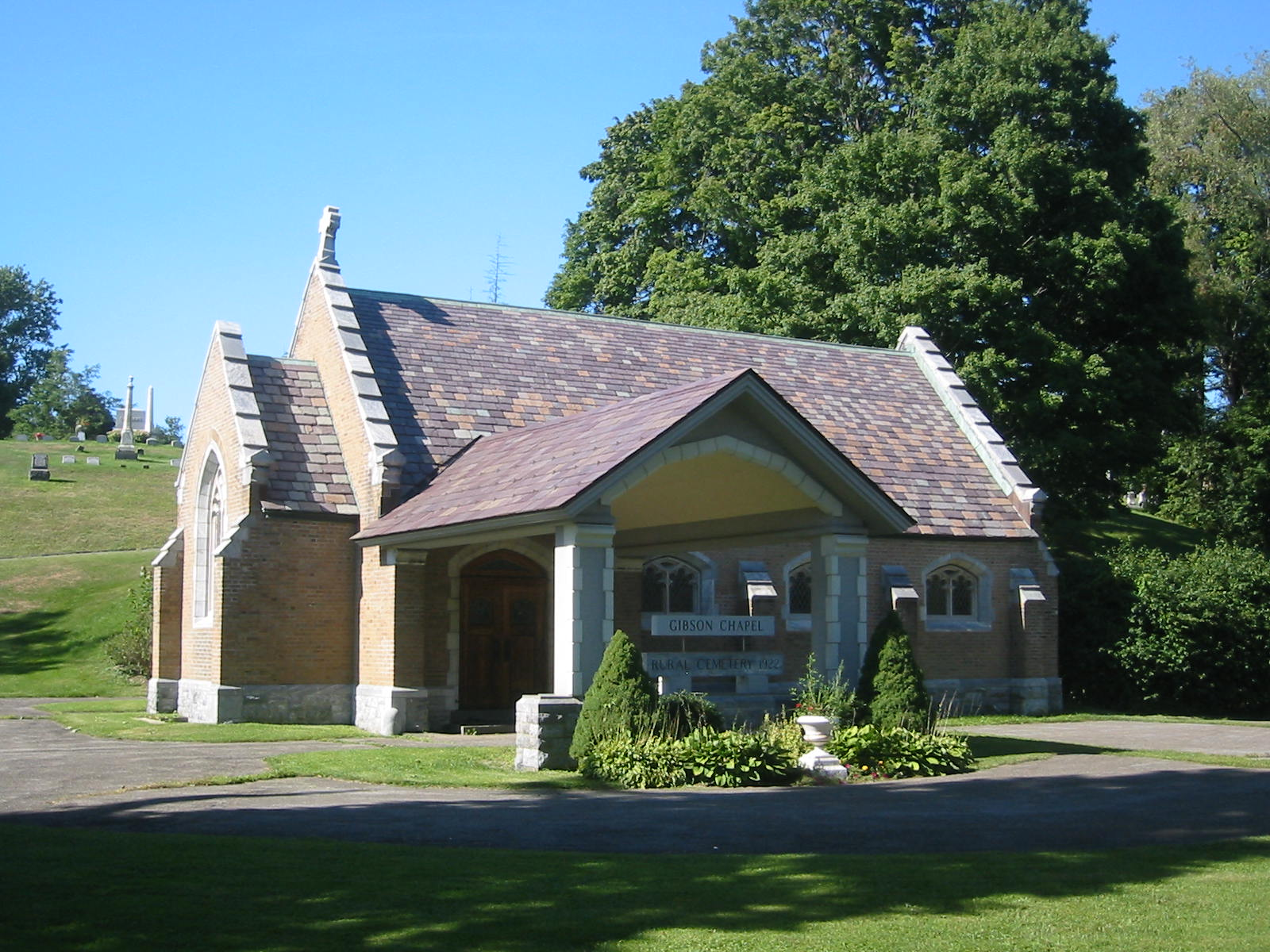
- Historic Gibson Memorial Chapel
- Interactive map of Cortland Rural Cemetery

Details
- Established: 1853
- Location: Cortland, New York
- Country: United States
- Coordinates: 42°35′37″N 76°11′15″W
- Size: 44 acres (18 ha)
- No. of graves: 19,000
- Cortland Rural Cemetery
- U.S. Historic district – Contributing property
- Part of: Tompkins Street–Main Street Historic District (ID75001179)
- Added to NRHP: March 18, 1975

The Cortland Rural Cemetery is located in Cortland, New York, United States. A non-profit, non-denominational cemetery established in 1853, the still operational cemetery has a physical footprint of approximately 44 acres (18 ha) and features the attributes typical of the mid-19th century garden cemetery or rural cemetery, including rolling hills, copious trees, curving roads, and an overall asymmetrical design. The cemetery is regulated by the New York State Department of State NYS Division of Cemeteries and as such has the special designation of 501(c)(13) reserved by independent, non-profit cemeteries in New York. It is managed by a volunteer Board of Trustees and funds its operations with a combination of revenues from operations such as burial fees, plot sales income, and marker foundation installation fees, ongoing donations from Cortland Rural Cemetery Foundation, and donations received from individual donors, other foundations, and in-kind assistance from the City of Cortland. Adjacent to the State University of New York at Cortland, located at 110 Tompkins Street, and an included in the Tompkins Street–Main Street Historic District on the National Register of Historic Places, the cemetery has over 19,000 individual graves on its grounds, including those of many notable figures in Cortland's history. The cemetery's grounds also include noteworthy historical architectural structures, including the Gibson Memorial Chapel designed (circa 1922) by noted architect George W. Conable and an office/garage and superintendent's mansion designed by Carl Wesley Clark (circa 1928). The cemetery has dedicated Veterans sections and is also home to a decades-old Jewish Cemetery associated with Cortland's Temple Brith Sholom.

== Notable burials ==
Sorted by surname.

- Bertha Blodgett, author of Stories of Cortland County for Boys and Girls, 1932.
- William L. Chaplin, general agent of the Underground Railroad
- Major General Levi R. Chase, highly decorated US Air Force officer and veteran of WWII, Korea, and Vietnam
- Rowland Lucius Davis, NYS Supreme Court Justice.
- Charles Holland Duell, Member of New York State Assembly, U.S. Commissioner of Patents.
- Rodolphus Holland Duell, Cortland County Judge and U.S. Representative.
- Major Andrew J. Grover, commander of the 76th Regiment of the New York Volunteers, killed at the Battle of Gettysburg on July 1, 1863.
- Nathan Lewis Miller, former governor of New York.
- Rufus T. Peck, publisher and New York assemblyman.
- Henry S. Randall, New York Secretary of State and biographer of Thomas Jefferson.
- Joseph Reynolds, US Congressman.
- Charles Walton Sanders, author of a popular, mid-1800s school reader series.
- Chester and Theodore Wickwire, late 19th century Cortland industrialists.

== Gallery ==
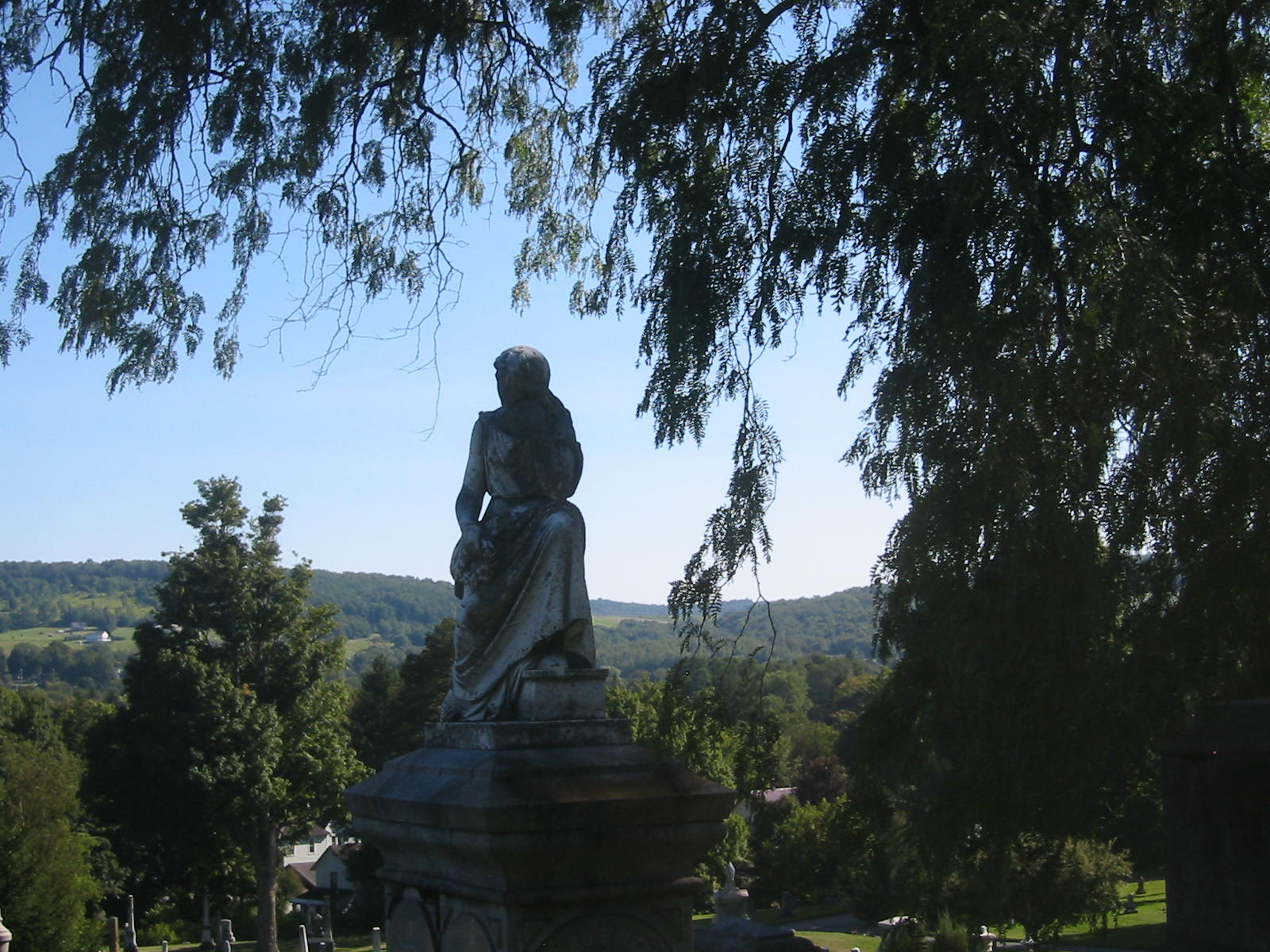
Hill-top view looking South toward Tompkins Street

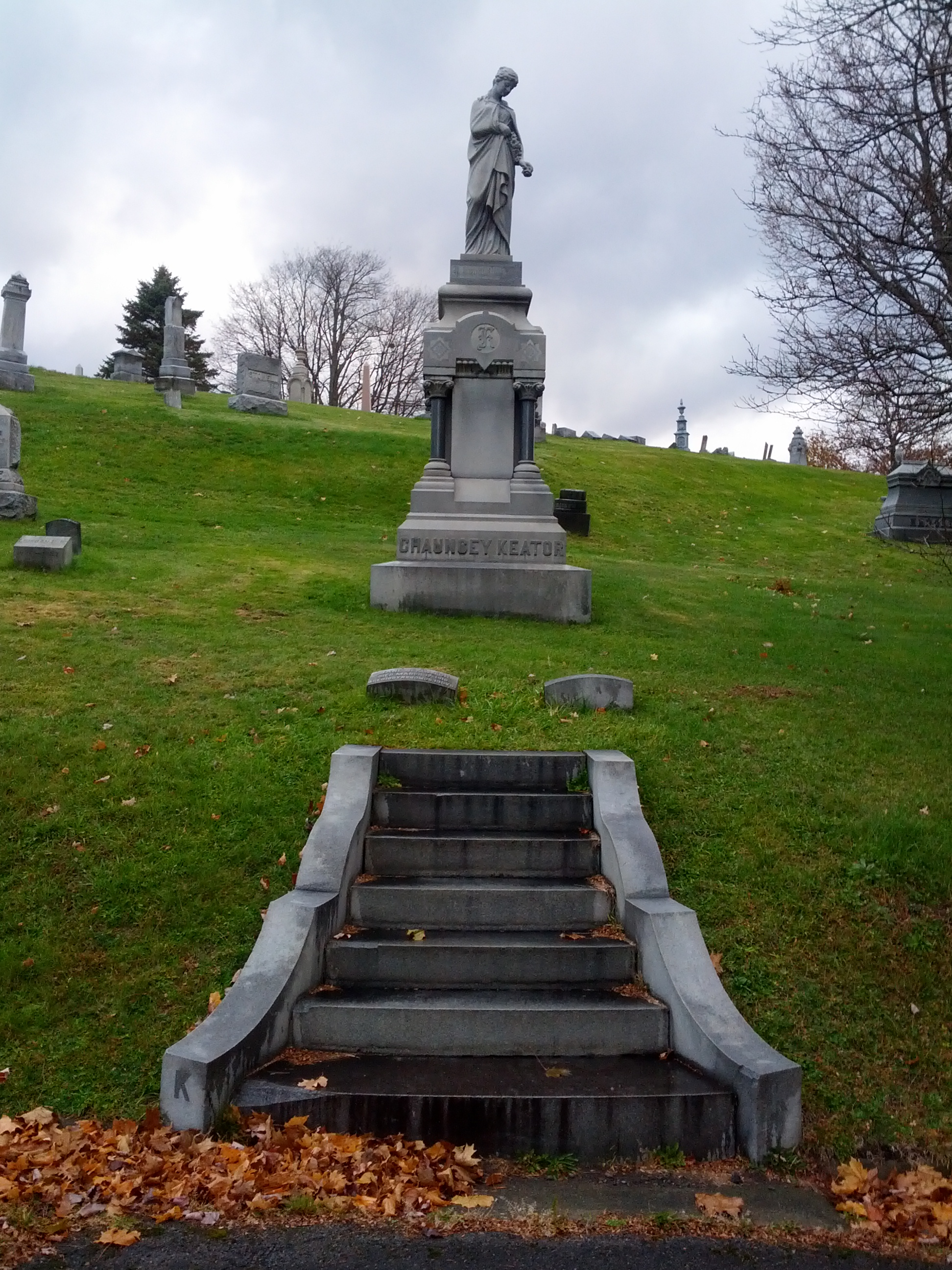
One of numerous large markers in the cemetery, this one marks the grave of Chauncey Keator
