= James Bailey House =

Historic house in Manhattan, New York

- Bailey House
- U.S. National Register of Historic Places
- U.S. Historic district – Contributing property
- New York State Register of Historic Places
- New York City Landmark
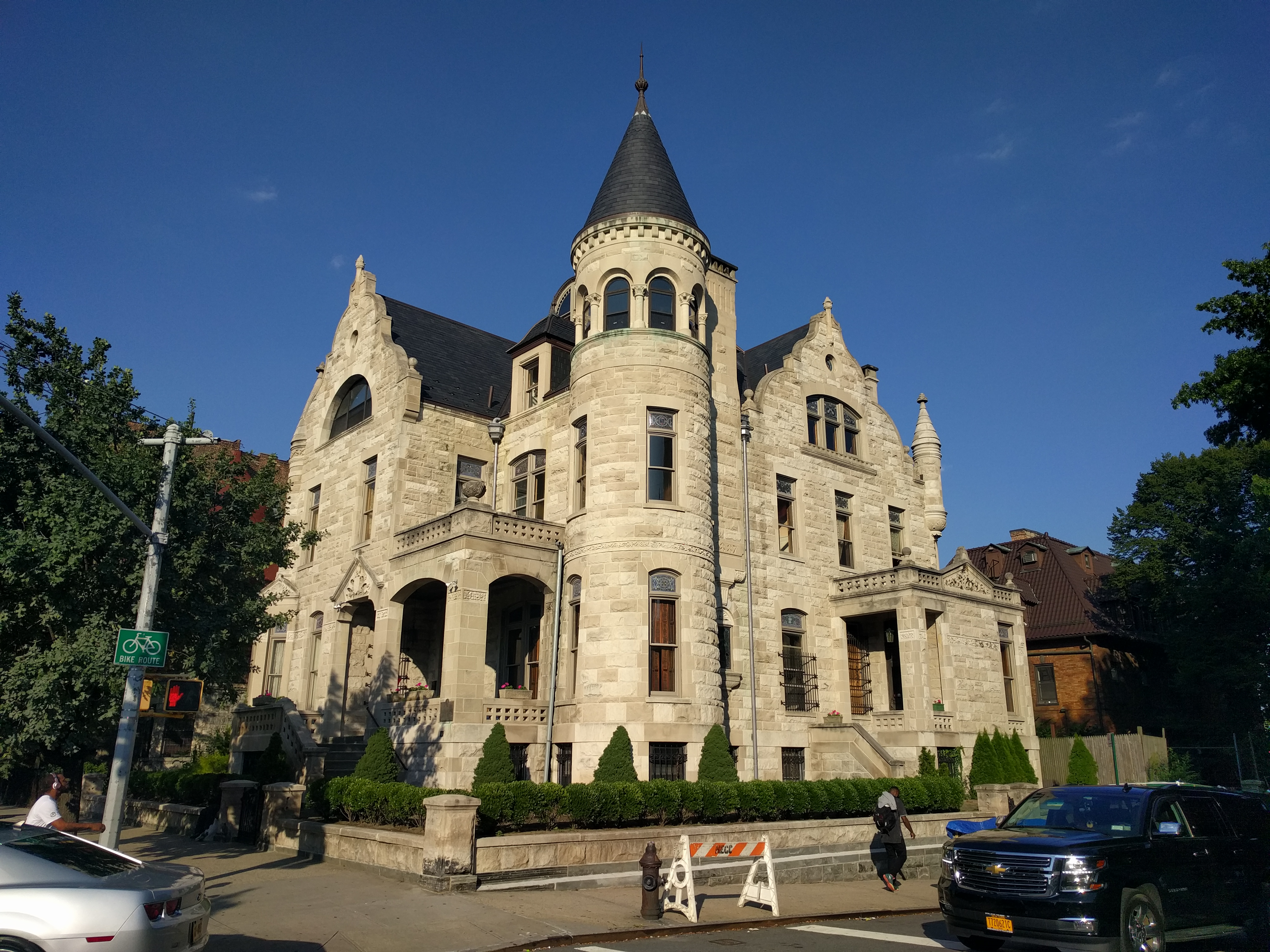
- The Bailey House in 2017

- Location within New York City Location within New York Location within the United States
- Location: 10 St. Nicholas Place; Manhattan, New York City
- Coordinates: 40°49′38″N 73°56′33″W
- Built: 1886–1888
- Architect: Samuel B. Reed
- Architectural style: Romanesque Revival
- Part of: Sugar Hill Historic District (ID02000360)
- NRHP reference No.: 80002668
- NYSRHP No.: 06101.001672
- NYCL No.: 0845

Significant dates
- Added to NRHP: April 23, 1980
- Designated NYSRHP: June 23, 1980
- Designated NYCL: February 19, 1974

The James A. and Ruth M. Bailey House is a freestanding limestone mansion located at 10 St. Nicholas Place at West 150th Street in the Sugar Hill section of Harlem in Manhattan, New York City. The house was built from 1886 to 1888 and was designed by architect Samuel Burrage Reed in the Romanesque Revival style for circus impresario James Anthony Bailey of the Barnum & Bailey Circus. When it was constructed there were few other buildings in the area, and as a result, sitting as it does on an escarpment, the Bailey Mansion had a clear view to the east of the Long Island Sound.

== History and description ==
Among the house's numerous design features are numerous unique stained glass mosaic windows, designed and fabricated by Henry Belcher, and the varying kinds of wood throughout each room. The interior is richly paneled in hand-carved timber. The exterior features Flemish-style gables and a corner tower.

Bailey sold the house two years prior to his death and from the 1910s to the 1950s, it was owned by a Bavarian doctor, Franz Koempel. In 1951, the house was purchased by Marguerite Blake, who ran it as the M. Marshall Blake Funeral Home until her retirement. The Bailey House was designated a New York City Landmark in 1974, and was added to the National Register of Historic Places in 1980. In 2000, a fire damaged portions of the house. In late 2008, she brought the house to market, seeking to sell it for $10 million. As of May 2009, it was being listed for $6.5 million. On August 31, 2009, it was reported that the house sold for $1.4 million, which is only around $170 per square foot.

In 2014, the house was renovated and cremated remains belonging to the funeral parlor were found in a Harlem storage unit. As of 2024, the house is still being repaired and restored by owners Martin Spollen and Chen Jie, and Jie's cousin Xu Haihua.

== Gallery ==
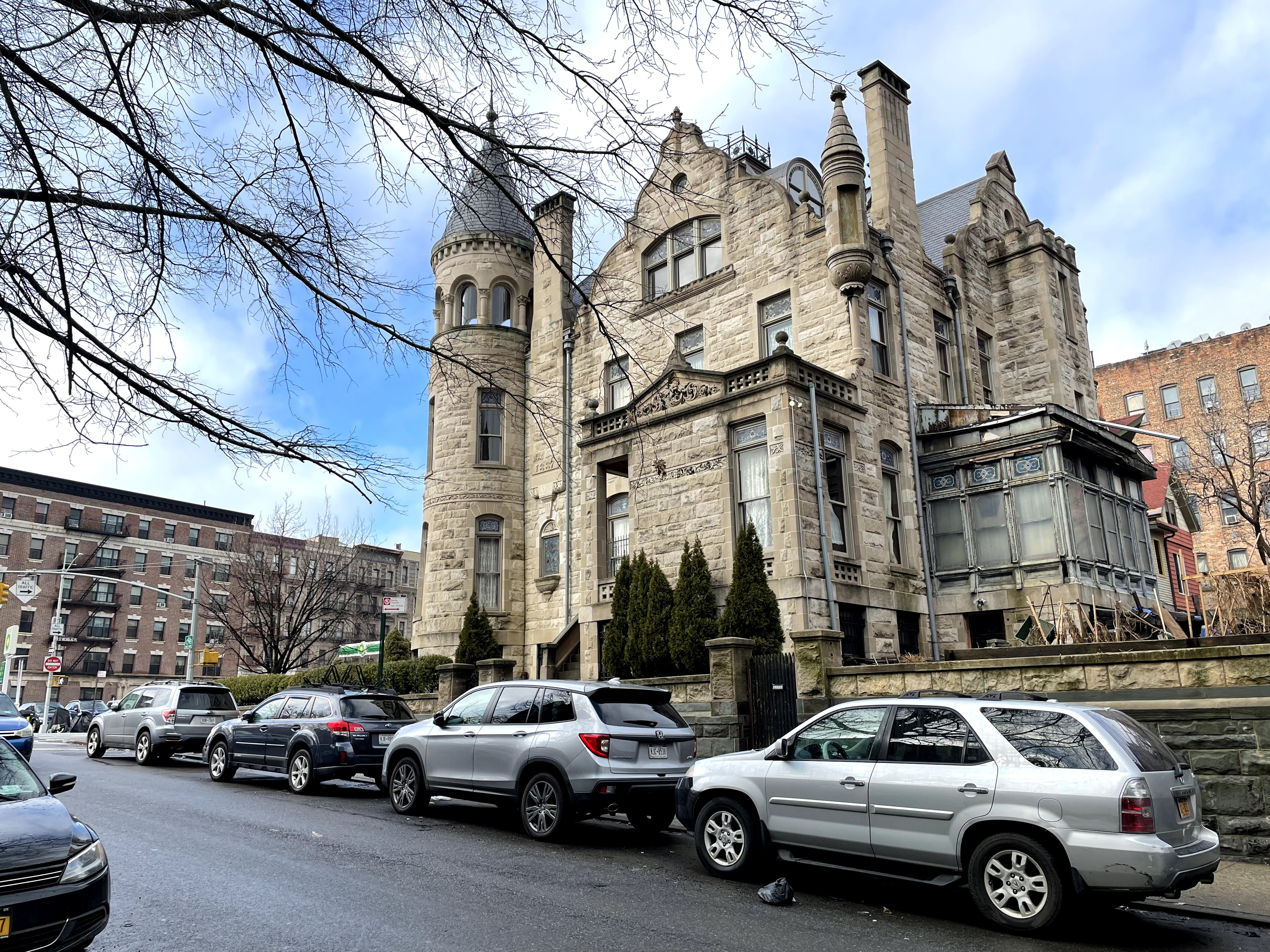
James Bailey House from St Nicholas Place, February 2021

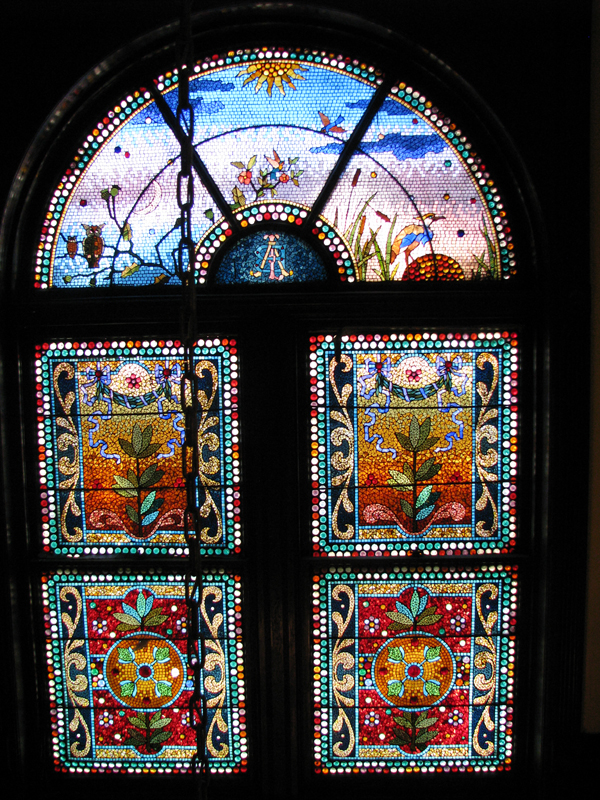
Belcher stained glass mosaic window

== See also ==
- List of New York City Designated Landmarks in Manhattan above 110th Street
- National Register of Historic Places listings in Manhattan above 110th Street
