= Rowland L. Davis =

New York State Supreme Court Justice

Justice Rowland L. Davis (Photo courtesy of the SUNY Cortland Memorial Library.)

Rowland L. Davis (July 11, 1871 - February 2, 1954) was a New York State Supreme Court Justice.

== Early life ==
Davis, of Cortland, New York, was born in Dryden, Tompkins County, New York, on July 11, 1871. He was the son of Lucius Davis (1835–1912) and Harriet (Francis) Davis (1839–1915.) Davis attended the district school near McLean and graduated from the Cortland Normal School (today SUNY Cortland). While at the normal school he became a member of the Young Men's Debating Club (later to be known as the Delphic Fraternity.) Davis then graduated from Cornell Law School in 1897. He was admitted to the bar on July 6, 1897.

== Legal career ==
Davis practiced law from 1897 to 1915. From 1897 to 1902, Davis practiced law in Cortland with Bronson & Davis and from 1902 until 1915 with Davis & Lusk. In March 1899, he was elected a police justice of the Village of Cortland, and when the village first became a city, he was elected first city judge in 1903.

Justice Davis was elected to the New York Supreme Court in 1915 and was designated an associate justice of the Appellate Division, Fourth Department in 1921. Davis was a justice of the Appellate Division of the New York Supreme Court, 1921-39 (4th Department 1921–26, 3rd Department 1926–31, 2nd Department 1931–39.) He retired from the bench in March, 1939, moving on to two years of trial work in the 6th District before final retirement on March 31, 1941. He was a Republican.

== Personal life ==
Davis was married to Iva A. Yager Davis (1883 - 1963). According to his Sons of the American Revolution Application dated Sept 26, 1932 National #52752 he was a descendant of John Lane Davis and Dolor Davis. On that same application he lists 2 children: Rowland Jr born Aug 3, 1907 and Harriet born May 2, 1910.

== Death ==
Justice Rowland L. Davis died in Cortland, N.Y. on February 2, 1954. He was 82 years old.

He was buried at the Cortland Rural Cemetery.

== Sources ==
- The Cortland Normal News, February 1893, Volume 15, No. 6, page 19.
- Political Graveyard.com
- The Delphic Fraternity, Inc.
- Supreme Court of the State of New York
- The Historical Society of the Courts of the State of New York
- THE HISTORY AND JUSTICES OF THE NYS APPELLATE DIVISION, THIRD DEPARTMENT
