= Joseph T. McCaddon =

American circus proprietor (1859-1938)

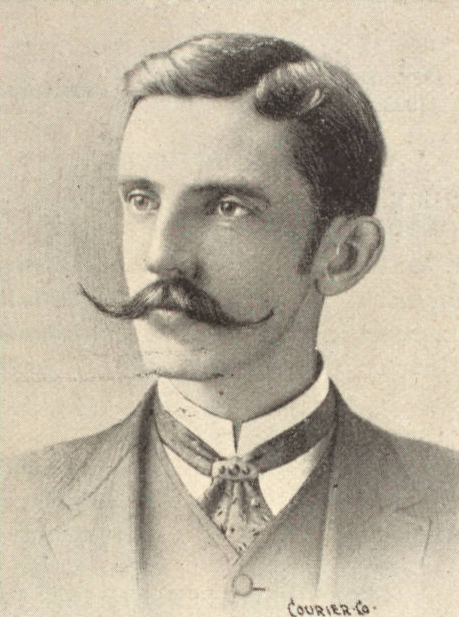
- Born: Joseph Terry McCaddon; January 31, 1859; Beverly, Washington County, Ohio, U.S.
- Died: January 21, 1938 (age 78); Great Neck, Long Island, New York, U.S.
- Occupation: Circus proprietor

Joseph T. McCaddon (January 31, 1859 – January 21, 1938) was an American showman and circus proprietor.

== Early life ==
Joseph Terry McCaddon was born on January 31, 1859, in Beverly, Washington County, Ohio. In 1888 he married Mayme Gray and had two sons, Joseph Terry McCaddon, Jr. born in 1895 and Stanley Gage McCaddon born in 1900. Mayme died in 1905 while the couple was in London, England. Joseph T. McCaddon married Betsey Chamberlain Ohnewald in Long Island, New York in 1927. He remained married until his death in 1938.

== Career ==
Joseph T. McCaddon was the brother-in-law of Barnum & Bailey Circus's James Anthony Bailey. He was associated for some years with the Barnum & Bailey Circus, both in America and abroad. He also had been connected with the Forepaugh-Sells Brothers' Circus and Buffalo Bill’s Wild West Show.

Joseph T. McCaddon, who had been managing the Adam Forepaugh shows for two years, became a co-owner on January 13, 1892, when J. A. Bailey purchased the shows from James E. Cooper and granted him half the interest. The shows remained under his management for the following season. For the 1892 and 1893 seasons, McCaddon was the proprietor and general manager of the Forepaugh shows. By 1894, Forepaugh's Circus was co-owned by McCaddon, Bailey, and James P. Anderson.

Acting as J. A. Bailey's representative, McCaddon accompanied Buffalo Bill’s Wild West Show while Bailey and William F. Cody were partners in the mid-1890s.

At the turn of the century, he was serving as business manager of the Barnum & Bailey enterprise.

McCaddon, long employed by J. A. Bailey in show business, later founded the McCaddon International and Wild West shows. After competing with the Buffalo Bill’s Wild West Show in France in 1905, the shows were stranded in Grenoble, where their stock was sold at auction. When his French circus venture failed, he was arrested in London, England, over alleged bankruptcy fraud but was released after the court blocked extradition. While Bailey helped J. T. McCaddon, the two became estranged.

After the death of his brother-in-law in 1906, McCaddon lived with his sister, Ruth L. Bailey, the sole beneficiary of the estate. The Bailey Estate Trust was established by Bailey's widow, J. T. McCaddon, W. W. Cole, and A. A. Stewart. In 1906, it sold Bailey's interest in the Adam Forepaugh and Sells Brothers circus to the Ringling Brothers. In 1908, Joseph's sister revised her will, naming him, his brother Theodore D. McCaddon, and their sister Lillie E. Harper as the chief beneficiaries.

== Death ==
Joseph T. McCaddon died on January 21, 1938, in Great Neck, New York, United States, at age 78.

== Legacy ==
The McCaddon collection, donated to the Princeton University Library by the sons of Joseph T. McCaddon in 1941, consists of Barnum & Bailey contracts, James A. Bailey's scrapbooks and letters, and various programs, pictures, and advertising items. In July 1978, new material was purchased at auction to enlarge the McCaddon collection.
