= Joseph Reynolds (New York politician) =

American politician

Member of the U.S. House of Representatives from New York's 22nd district
- In office March 4, 1835 – March 3, 1837
- Preceded by: Nicoll Halsey; Samuel G. Hathaway
- Succeeded by: Hiram Gray; Andrew DeWitt Bruyn

Personal details
- Born: September 14, 1785 Easton, New York, USA
- Died: September 24, 1864 (aged 79) Cortland, New York, USA
- Resting place: Cortland Rural Cemetery
- Party: Jacksonian

Joseph Reynolds (September 14, 1785 – September 24, 1864) was an American farmer from New York who served as a brigadier general of state militia troops during the War of 1812, as a judge, and as a U.S. Representative from New York for one term from 1835 to 1837.

== Biography ==
Born in Easton in Washington County, New York, Reynolds completed academic studies. He moved to Virgil, New York, in 1809, and engaged in agricultural pursuits.

=== Early career ===
He organized a company of riflemen for service in the War of 1812, and served as a major, colonel, and brigadier general in the State troops. He was a Justice of the Peace 1815–1837, and was a member of the New York State Assembly in 1819.

He served as judge of Cortland County 1821–1839, and as supervisor of the town of Cortlandville 1825–1835.

=== Congress ===
Reynolds was elected as a Jacksonian to the Twenty-fourth Congress (March 4, 1835 – March 3, 1837).

=== Later career and death ===
He was elected the first president of the village of Cortland, New York in 1864. He died in Cortland on September 24, 1864, and was interred in the Cortland Rural Cemetery.

== Sources ==
- United States Congress. "Joseph Reynolds (id: R000177)". Biographical Directory of the United States Congress.

U.S. House of Representatives
| Preceded by Samuel G. Hathaway | Member of the U.S. House of Representatives from New York's 22nd congressional district 1835–1837 | Succeeded by Hiram Gray |
