= Tompkins Street–Main Street Historic District =

Historic district in New York, United States

- Tompkins Street/Main Street Historic District
- U.S. National Register of Historic Places
- U.S. Historic district
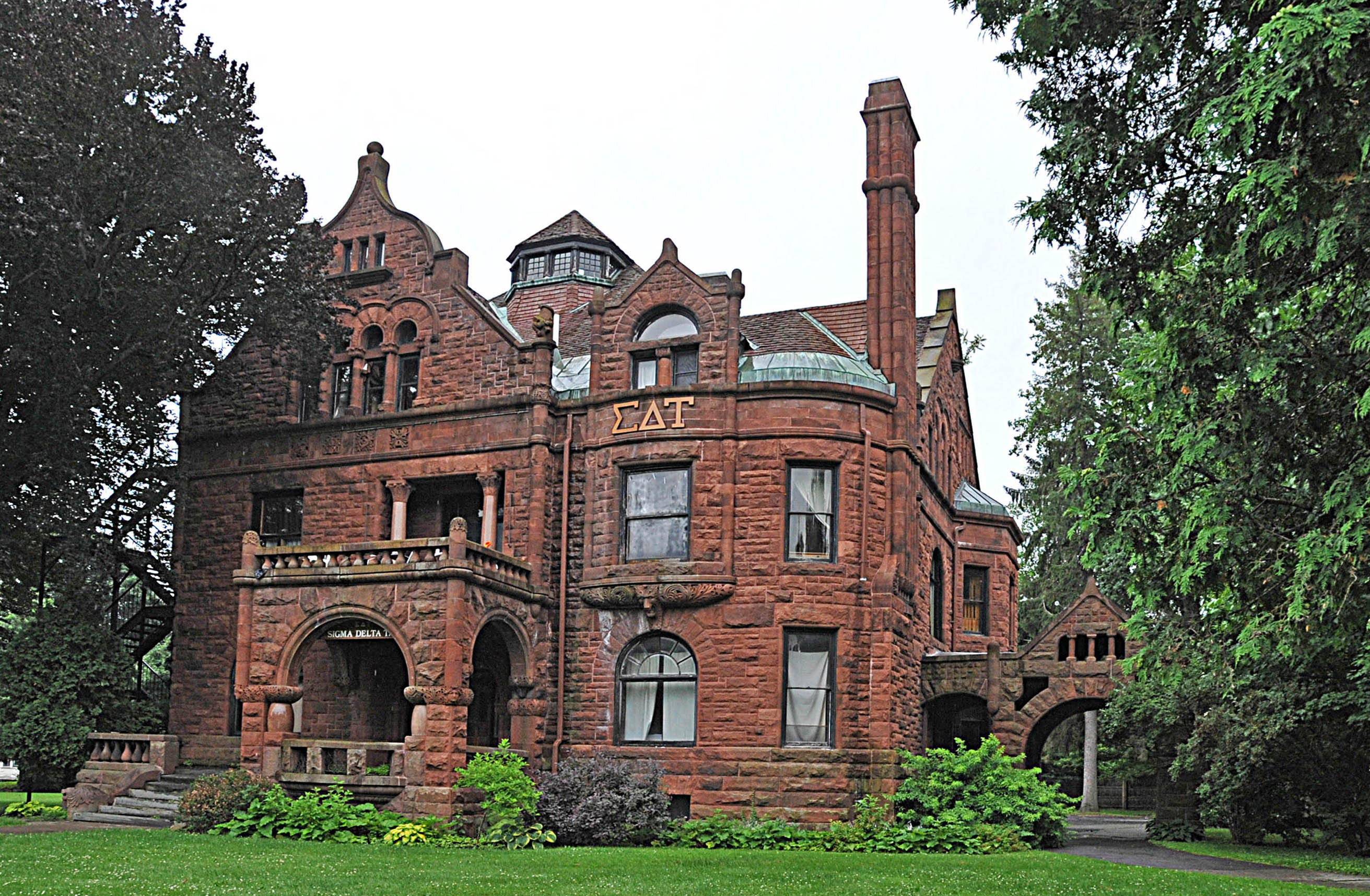

- Location within New York Location within the United States
- Location: Tompkins and intersecting streets from Main St. to Cortland Rural Cemetery (original); Main St. from Tompkins St. to Clinton Ave. (increase); Cortland, New York
- Coordinates: 42°35′43″N 76°11′12″W
- Built: 1810
- Architectural style: Stick/Eastlake, Italianate (original); Mid 19th Century Revival, Late 19th And 20th Century Revivals, Late Victorian (increase)
- NRHP reference No.: 75001179 (original); 82001116 (increase)
- Added to NRHP: March 18, 1975 (original); November 17, 1982 (increase)

Tompkins Street–Main Street Historic District, formerly known as Tompkins Street Historic District, is a historic district in Cortland, New York. It encompasses 109 contributing buildings and one contributing site in the central business district of Cortland and the surrounding residential areas. It includes about 60 commercial buildings built between 1860 and 1910, public buildings such as the separately listed U.S. Post Office, and the Cortland Rural Cemetery. Residences date as early as the 1830s and include mansions from the 1890-1916 period. Most residences are 2 1/2 stories and of frame construction.

Under the Tompkins Street name, it was listed on the National Register of Historic Places in 1975. Its boundaries were increased to include Main Street from Tompkins to Clinton Streets in 1982.
