= Terry Mulligan =

American novelist

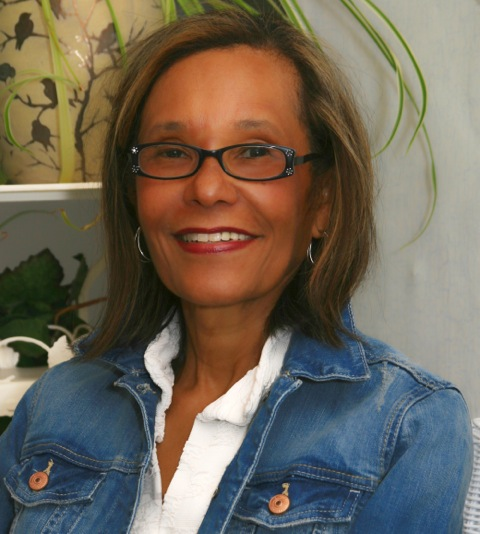
Terry Mulligan

Terry Baker Mulligan is an American novelist. Author of the novel, Afterlife in Harlem and the memoir, Sugar Hill: Where the Sun Rose Over Harlem, she is the winner of a 2012 IPPY Award and 2013 Benjamin Franklin Awards.

== Childhood and education ==
Mulligan’s mother Olivia Hodges Jackson worked as a secretary in the offices of the Harlem-based New York Amsterdam News, and later for the administration at the City College of New York. Her father, the Philadelphia-born Roy Baker, was a Cotton Club dancer and an entertainer with Cab Calloway’s troupe during the Harlem Renaissance era. Although never married to her mother, Baker took some responsibility for Terry’s upbringing, with colorful weekend adventures along Seventh Avenue defining his relationship with young Terry.

Mulligan attended both public and private schools while growing up in New York City, graduating high school from the “progressive powerhouse,” the New Lincoln School in Harlem. She obtained her bachelor's degree in English from Wagner College in Staten Island, New York City, and she completed her formal education at the City College of New York, earning a Master of Arts degree in English.

== Memoir, Sugar Hill: Where The Sun Rose Over Harlem ==
Making her home in St. Louis, Missouri, after her marriage to Michael Mulligan in the early 1970s, Mulligan began writing the first of several versions of what would become her award-winning 2012 memoir Sugar Hill, Where the Sun Rose Over Harlem. In it, she celebrates the life of the neighborhood as she knew it in the 1950s, a place where African-American achievers and celebrities made their homes alongside middle-class families and lower-income blacks and whites. Mulligan writes about her frequent visits to the Apollo Theater in its heyday as a showcase for the great stars of jazz, soul, gospel, R&B and early rock ‘n roll. She also details extensively the shaping influence that her maternal grandmother, her mother and her mother’s sisters had on her growing up. The cover of Sugar Hill was included on the front of Publishers Weekly in March 2012, featuring titles from the Independent Book Publishers Association.

== Awards ==
In May 2012, Sugar Hill, Where the Sun Rose Over Harlem was awarded the Independent Publishers Gold Medal for Adult Multicultural Nonfiction.

In 2013, Sugar Hill won two Benjamin Franklin Gold Medal Awards for Autobiography/Memoir and Multicultural Writing.
