= Samuel B. Reed =

American architect

Samuel Burrage Reed
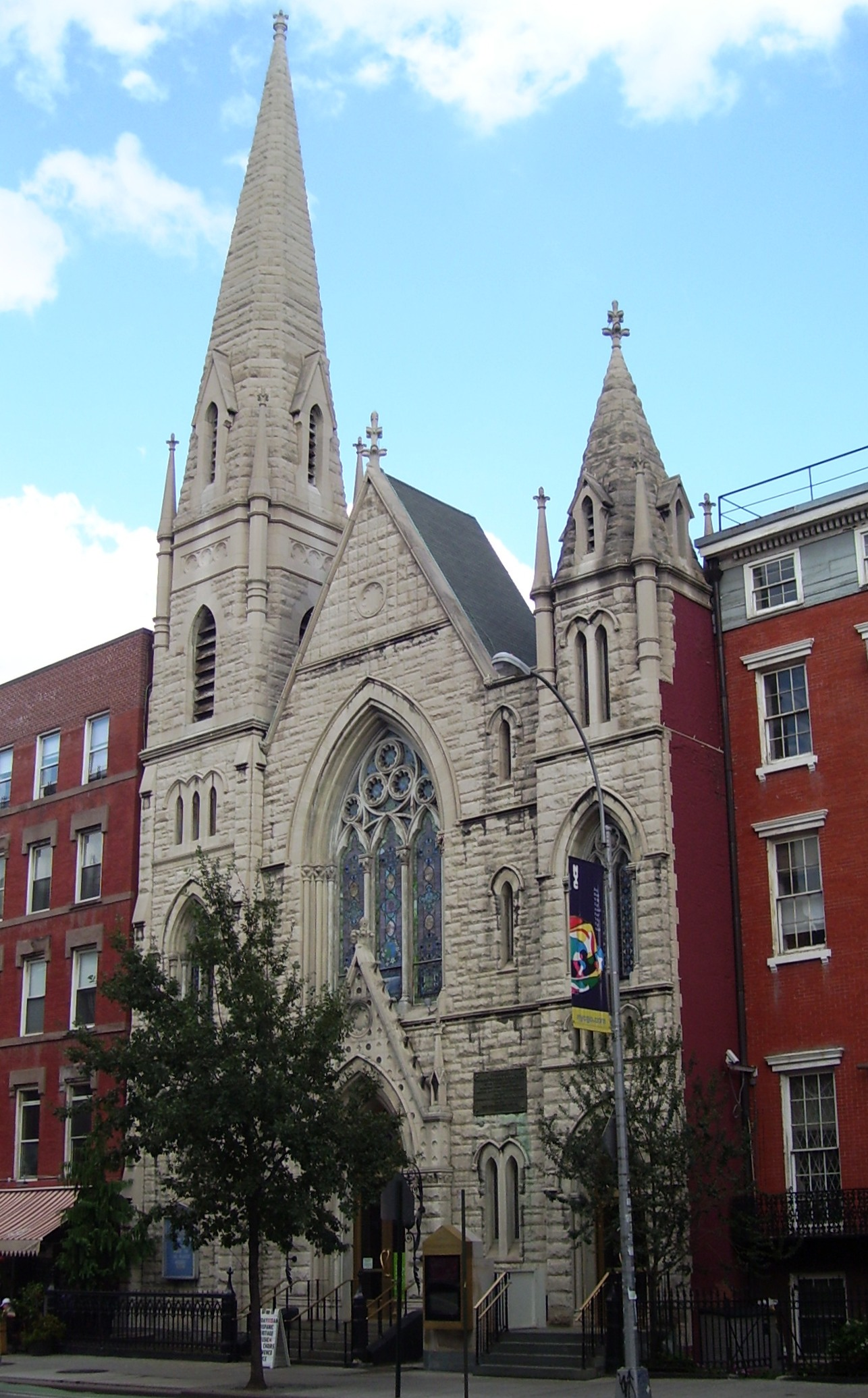
- New Middle Collegiate Church
- Born: January 7, 1834; Meriden, New Haven County, Connecticut
- Other names: S. B. Reed
- Known for: Architect

Samuel Burrage Reed was an American architect of Corona, New York, and Woodcliff Lake, New Jersey. He was active in mid-to-late nineteenth-century and early twentieth-century America, particularly in New York State, New York City, and Connecticut.

Born in Meriden, Connecticut, he was first trained as a carpenter before becoming an architect. He is notable for designing several mansions, as well as public and ecclesiastical buildings. Reed was a member of the American Institute of Architects (AIA).

== Works ==
- 1903 – Passaic County Court House, Paterson, New Jersey.
- 1891 – New Middle Collegiate Church, Second Avenue, New York City.
- 1890 – Chester Wickwire House, Cortland, New York (now the 1890 House Museum).
- 1889 - First Presbyterian Church Complex (Cortland, New York)
- 1888 – James Bailey House, Manhattan, New York City (of Barnum & Bailey Circus fame).
- 1883 – John C. Reichert House, Tipton, Iowa.
- Pinard Cottages, Newport, Rhode Island.
