= John Christian and Bertha Landrock Reichert House =

Historic house in Iowa, United States

- U.S. National Register of Historic Places
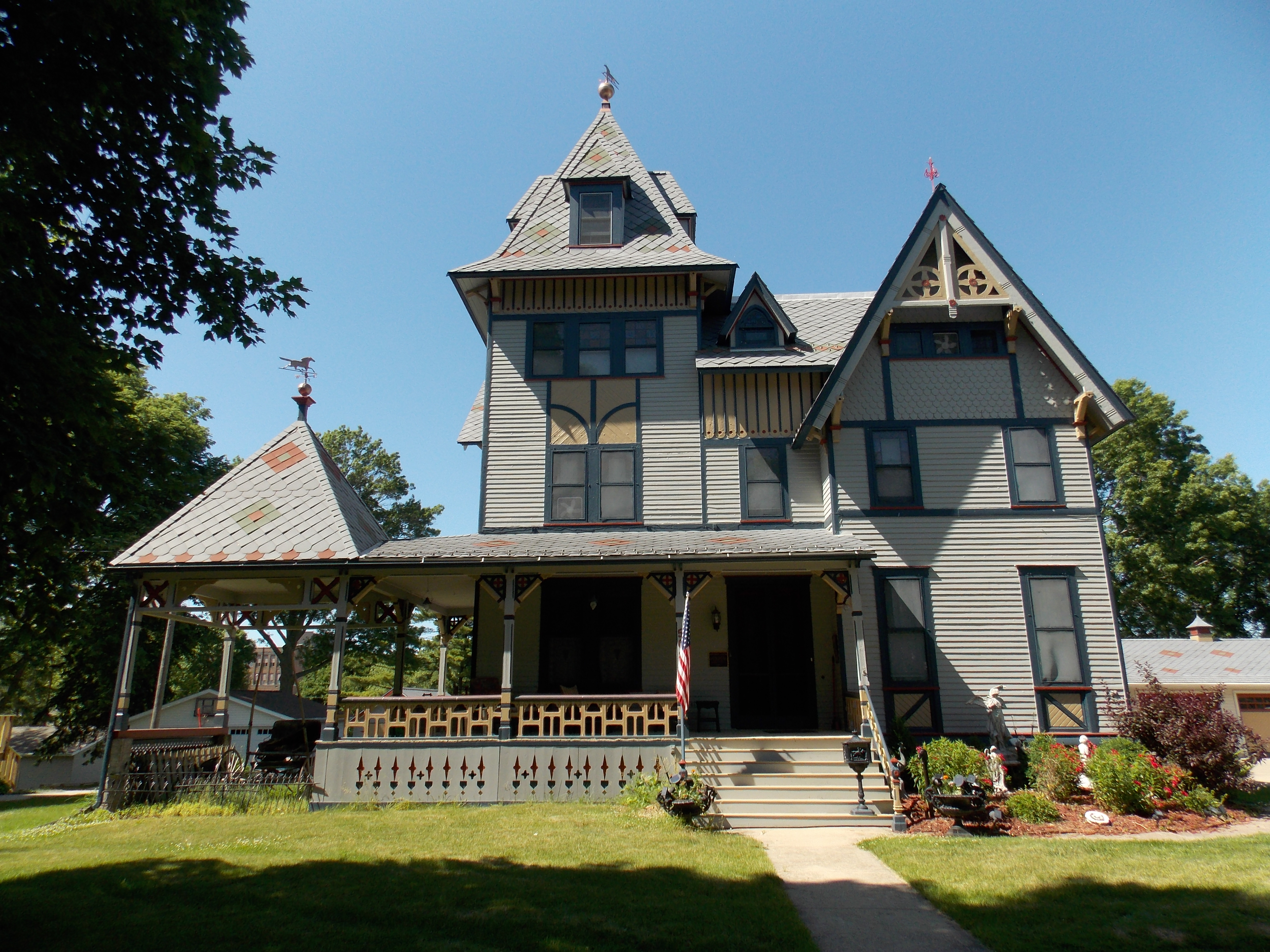

- Location within Iowa Location within the United States
- Location: 508 E. 4th St. Tipton, Iowa
- Coordinates: 41°46′09″N 91°07′19″W
- Area: 3 acres (1.2 ha)
- Built: 1883
- Architect: Samuel B. Reed
- Architectural style: Stick style
- NRHP reference No.: 91001861
- Added to NRHP: December 19, 1991

Eastlake Victorian Home - Tipton Iowa John Christian and Bertha Landrock Reichert House is a historic residence located in Tipton, Iowa, United States. Built in 1883 by J.C. Reichert (architect Samuel B. Reed, New York). The home was sited in an oak grove which provided much of the lumber used in its construction. This home is a 3½ story frame structure built on a limestone foundation with a full basement that is paved in paving bricks. It is a rare example of the Eastlake Victorian style (also known as the Stick style). As such, it is one of the largest and most complete homes of this unique era still standing. The rectangular-shaped main block is capped with a steeply pitched cross gabled roof. A large, rectangular tower is prominent on the main facade, as is the front porch that ends in a pyramid shaped turret. The home retains all of its etched glass doors and colored glass windows. When constructed, the home featured a rare luxury of the time; indoor running water on all three floors. Rain water was collected by way of channels in the roofing system and directed into a 700 gallon reservoir in the third floor. In addition, several rooms retain their original frescoed ceilings.

This home served briefly as a bed and breakfast before returning to its current use as a private residence in 1996. It has been listed on the National Register of Historic Places since 1991.

J.C. Riechert was a native of Bavaria who immigrated to Ohio in 1837 and moved to Tipton in 1855. He and his brother, John Henry, were carpenters. They became contractors and built numerous buildings in the area. They expanded their business by adding a lumberyard before they opened a hardware and farm implement business. Reichert also served as a director of the Cedar County State Bank. Reicherts sold the house to Frank D. Wingert, a banker, in 1897 and moved to Cedar Rapids. The house remained in the Wingert family until 1969.
