= Belcher mosaic windows =

Type of windows manufactured from 1884 to 1897

Belcher mosaic windows were manufactured in the United States by the Belcher Mosaic Glass Company between 1884 and 1897. Identifiable by their unique, continuous lead matrix and use of small, glass tesserae, Belcher windows are an example of the innovation occurring in decorative glass during the nineteenth century. Also referred to as “mercury mosaics” or “metallo mosaics”, Belcher windows echo many of the larger concepts at play in American architecture during the end of the 1800s including an emphasis on the inherent nature of the material to impart design and a capitalization of developments in technology to create more affordable decorative objects. While their era of production was short lived, Belcher windows were popular and many examples still survive today, both in situ but more likely in collections.

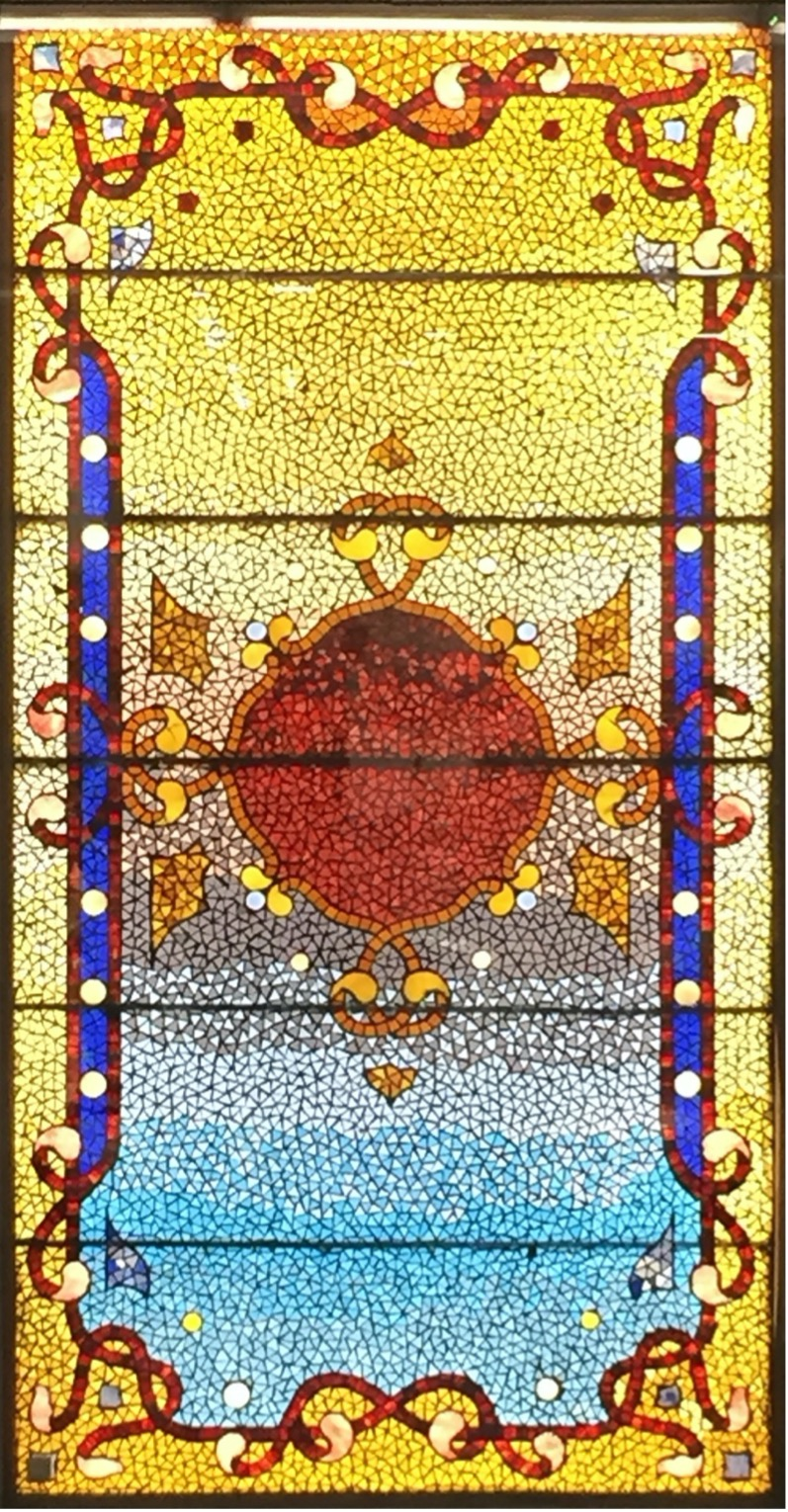
Figure 1 “Earth, Art, Fire and Water: Museum No. 1078" Belcher Mosaic Glass Company. 1885–1887. Originally housed in a mansion in East Milwaukee, the window is now part of Macy's The Art of American Victorian Stained Glass exhibit, located in the Chicago department store's State Street pedway.

== The Belcher Mosaic Glass Company ==
Located in Newark, New Jersey, research gathered by Barbara E. Krueger, Director of the Michigan Stained Glass Census, indicates that the Belcher Glass Company was in operation as early as 1825. It is unclear what kind of work was being performed by the Belcher Glass Company in its early years, though it is almost certainly not figural stained glass. The timeline established by Krueger shows that the company, then called Cooper & Belcher Glass, began producing decorative windows as early as 1855. The company experiences a third change in ownership in 1875 and is renamed as Belcher & Povey until the 1880s when the Belcher Mosaic Glass Company is founded following the invention of Henry F Belcher's “Mosaic of Glass and Lead Glazing” process, patented in 1884. The company's first catalogue published in 1886 includes over fifty full-color examples of Belcher mosaic windows customers could select. Designs included in this publication ranged from simple mixes of colors and shapes, complex geometric patterns, transom lights with building numbers for secular use, and figural scenes for religious settings. The catalogue also boasts that the Belcher system produces windows that are lighter, air-tight, and more durable than their leaded counterparts. Whether this is accurate or not, it does show that the Belcher Mosaic Glass Company sought to compete directly with other stained glass studios at the time. It should also be noted that surviving examples of Belcher mosaic windows do show that both the patented matrix system and traditional leaded method were sometimes used in the same panel. Based on archival evidence and the dates of construction of all known windows, it is likely that the Belcher Mosaic Glass Company went out of business after 1897.

== Production ==
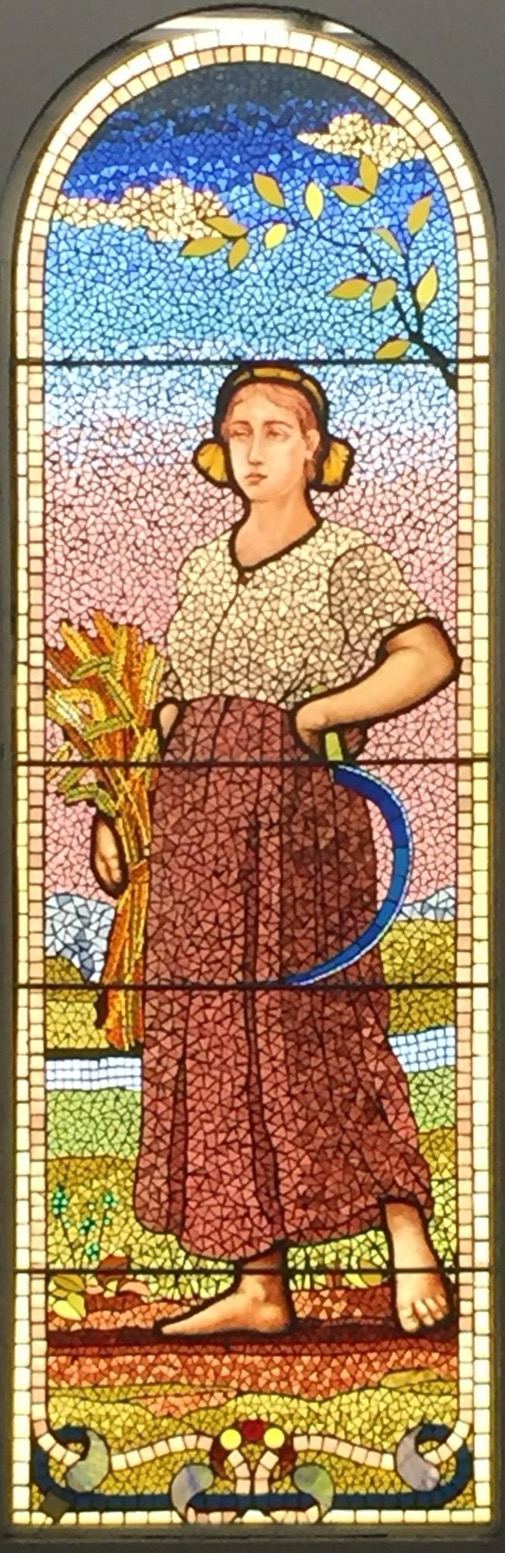
Figure 2 "Standing Woman: Museum No. 6.1029" Belcher Mosaic Glass Company. 1885–1897. Macy's The Art of American Victorian Stained Glass exhibit, located in the Chicago department store's State Street pedway.

Belcher mosaic windows were created following a patented method of applying a molten metal matrix to a pre-arranged design of glass tesserae. As a result, Belcher mosaic windows contain a continuous lead matrix to hold pieces of glass in place, unlike traditional stained glass windows which use pieces of metal. As specified in his patent application for this method, Henry Belcher sought to improve upon leaded stained glass, utilizing advances in technology to produce a more durable and cost-effective product.

Henry F Belcher's first patent submitted in 1884 illustrates the process by which pieces of glass were adhered to sheets of asbestos with space intentionally left in-between for the metal matrix. An unspecified material could then be placed on top of each piece of glass that was slightly smaller is size in order to allow the molten metal to flow slightly over the edges of the glass to create a flange for added security. A second sheet of asbestos was adhered on top and a metal frame was placed around the edges to form the rest of the mold. The use of asbestos sheeting was important due to the material's ability to accommodate any 3-dimensional components, such as pressed jewels, yet maintain rigidity to prevent the molten material from pushing outward and flowing over the glass pieces. If projecting elements were utilized in a design, the top asbestos sheet was dampened before being pressed against any projecting objects to take an impression. The sheet was then allowed to dry before the assembly processes continued. A series of transversal grooves could also be carved into the asbestos sheeting to create lines of thickened matrix material, resulting in lines of reinforcement referred to as ribs. Also listed as an option for reinforcement was the inclusion of “core-wire”, an unspecified wire material cast into the matrix. The patent also specified that the asbestos sheeting's ability to take and hold heat was utilized in the manufacturing process. Prior to filling the mold, Henry writes that both the asbestos and glass were heated. This was done to avoid thermal shock when the molten matrix came in contact with the glass and to prevent the liquid matrix from cooling too quickly, inhibiting the material's ability to flow and fill the mold. After the sandwiched layers were fully prepared, the mold was filled with the molten metal, an alloy composed of lead, bismuth, tin, copper, and antimony. This particular alloy combination was preferred by Belcher for its characteristic expansion on cooling, which he believed added to the strength of the resulting panel. After the panel had cooled, water was used to dissolve the adhesive and remove the asbestos sheeting.

In May 1885, Henry Belcher submitted a second patent that expanded on his initial production process by presenting methods to improve the overall durability, strength, and appearance of the window. Chief among these was the introduction of a separate metal framing incorporated into the poured matrix. Figures included in the patent illustrate how Belcher had developed a system for laying thin brass strips of metal across channels in the mosaic pattern prior to assembling the remainder of the mold and pouring in the liquid metal. Essentially, the strip of metal would act as a flange of lead, overlapping the edges of glass, while the poured matrix would run underneath to form the core or heart. While his previous process of creating ribs had offered some reinforcement, the addition of non-lead based metal supports provided greater resistance to buckling. Another option for cast-in-place reinforcement specified by Belcher is the use of steel wire meant to improve upon his previous “core-wire”.

The use of a poured matrix seen can be seen as a predecessor to the twentieth century dalle de verre windows which utilized a similar method of pouring a liquid matrix (concrete or epoxy resin) around an arranged glass design. Comparisons between Belcher mosaic windows and cloisonné, a technique dating back to Mycenae which involves creating a thin and complex metal matrix across a surface and then filling the small sections with colorful material ranging from glass, gemstones, and enamel.

Theories regarding why manufacturing of Belcher mosaic windows stopped are often linked to the object's production method. It has been speculated that perhaps the use of mercury in the manufacturing process led to workers falling ill and the factory being shut down. However, this claim has not been substantiated. Others have posed the possibility of lead poisoning being likely. While future research may confirm either theory, other elements such as changes in tastes are also conceivable factors.

== Design ==
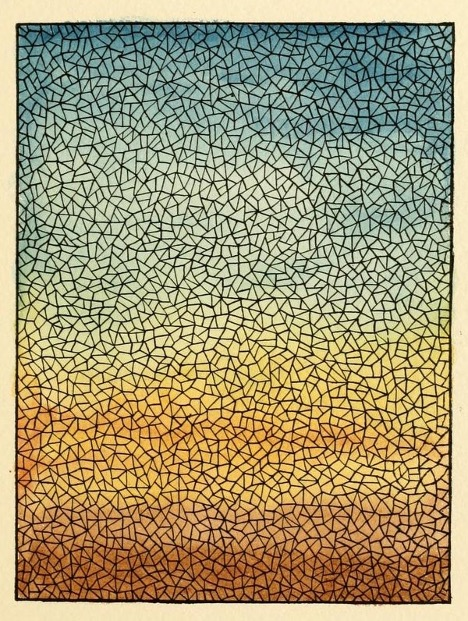
Figure 3 Example of a color gradient window design from the Belcher Mosaic Glass Company Catalogue, 1886.

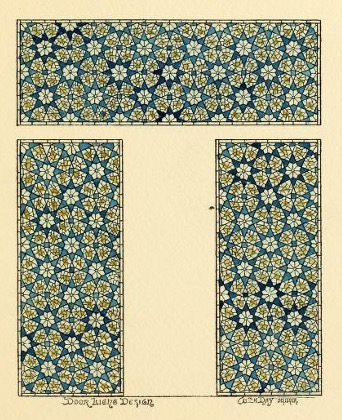
Figure 4 Mosaic door light designs from the Belcher Mosaic Glass Company Catalogue, 1886, Designed by W. H. Day.

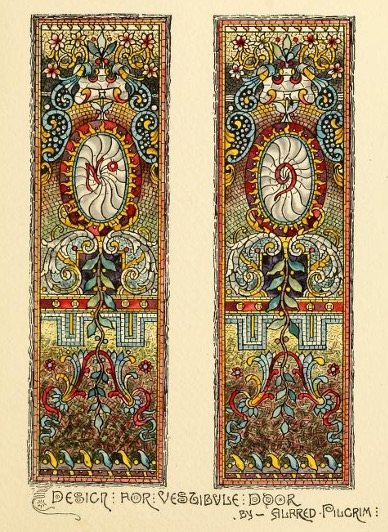
Figure 5 Vestibule door design from the Belcher Mosaic Glass Company Catalogue, 1886, designed by Alfred Pilgrim.

The Belcher Mosaic Glass Company’ first catalogue was published in 1886 and features a foreword written by stained glass designer Caryl Coleman, brother of American artist Charles Caryl Coleman. In his writing, Coleman commends the use of glass in the decorative arts in the United States during the second half of the nineteenth century. Coleman writes, “Almost from the first the American artist abandoned the usages and traditions of the European schools, and aimed at brilliant effect rather than design, striving for artistic and harmonious arrangement of diverse color rather than merely transparent pictures.” Here, Coleman is speaking to the strong tradition of mosaic windows developed in the United States during the 1800s.

The stained glass revival in the United States is a culmination of many factors including changes in taste, the economy, and technology. Design influences are varied and many, such as the Munich-style, Arts and Crafts Movement, Art Nouveau, and Eclecticism seen in architecture. During the mid-to-late 1800s several types of decorative window styles developed in the United States, including mosaic windows. As with other American decorative glass at the time, Belcher mosaic windows followed the general movement away from a reliance on fired-on paint and towards what North American artists saw as a more accurate revival of gothic values: a reliance on the material to impart design and a desire to emphasize the brilliance of glass.

Surviving examples and illustrated designs from the Belcher Mosaic Glass Company's 1886 catalogue show a variety of styles and motifs. Simple color gradient panels rely entirely on the color of the glass and their strategic placement to create serene shifts in color (fig. 3). The color gradient motif was commonly incorporated as the background in panels with designs in the foreground (fig. 1). The use of geometric patterns and classical motifs are also recurrent. Many of the repeating mosaic designs are evocative of Norman Romanesque ornamentation and Islamic decorative motifs from the Middle Ages (fig. 4). Panels can again either solely feature these mosaic designs or utilize them as a backdrop. Typical classical motifs employed in Belcher mosaic windows include flowers, leaves, scrolls, swags, and ribbons (fig. 5). During the stained glass revival in the United States, decorative glass windows were used in both secular and non-secular settings. The Belcher Company Catalogue features several examples of transom or door lites with address numbers integrated into the design. The use of Belcher mosaic windows to advertise a business or display an building's address is part of a larger trend seen in stained glass windows during the nineteenth century. The Belcher Catalogue also contains religious designs for a non-secular setting (fig. 8). While the designs do not indicate whether the figures would have been composed of mosaic pieces or larger sections of glass, surviving examples of figural windows show a combination of both. In the window "Standing Woman: Museum No. 6.1029" (fig. 2), the figure's clothes and accessories are made of small, triangular pieces of colored glass and the figure's face, arms, and feet are larger pieces of cut glass that have been painted. Other representational designs include landscapes, animals, and architectural features (fig. 7)

Visually, there are similarities between Belcher mosaic windows and those made using the copper-foil method. Patented by Stanford Bray in 1886, copper-foiling involves applying a thin layer of copper-foil along the edges of the cut pieces of glass in order to then solder the material together. It is presumed that Bray's patent was acquired by Louis C. Tiffany as windows and lampshades produced by Tiffany Studios heavily utilized this technique. Both the Belcher and copper-foil technique were developed and utilized near the end of the 19th century and built upon an established tradition of mosaic decorative windows within the United States. While both utilized smaller pieces of glass held in place by a visually continuous matrix, Belcher mosaic windows are easily distinguishable from those made via copper-foiling. Belcher mosaic windows tend to use angular pieces of glass (generally triangular) with the optional inclusion of pressed jewels and the matrix between pieces is inconsistent in width. Copper-foiled components typically have a tight fit and while there may be some variation in the width of the matrix, it displays more uniformity and flow across the design.

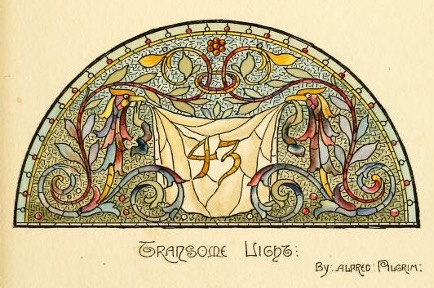
Figure 6 Transom light design with building number from the Belcher Mosaic Glass Company Catalogue, 1886, designed by Alfred Pilgrim.

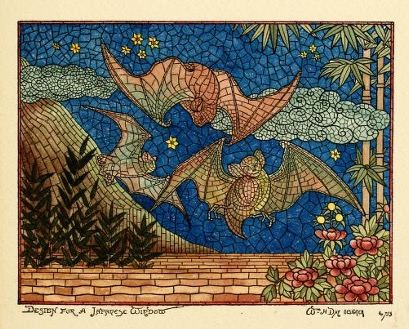
Figure 7 “Japanese Window” design with bats against the night sky, number from the Belcher Mosaic Glass Company Catalogue, 1886, designed by W. H. Day.

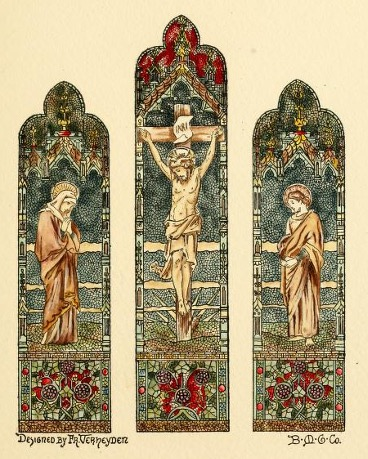
Figure 8 A design for a trio of religious themed lancet windows showing the crucifixion, from the Belcher Mosaic Glass Company Catalogue, 1886, designed by Fr. Verneyder.

== Use ==
Belcher mosaic windows were installed in both public and residential settings. Today, examples can be found in their original setting and in collections. The Michigan Stained Glass Census contains additional information on the location of existing Belcher mosaic windows within Michigan. Additional examples are on public display in Chicago, Illinois as part of Macy’s The Art of American Victorian Stained Glass exhibit, located in the department store's State Street pedway.

== See also ==
- Architectural glass
- Autonomous stained glass
- Cloisonné
- Dalle de verre
- Smith Museum of Stained Glass Windows
- Stained glass
- Stained glass conservation
