= List of turnpikes in New York =

This is a list of turnpikes built and operated by private companies in the U.S. state of New York, mainly in the 19th century. While most of the roads are still maintained as free public roads, some have been abandoned.

== Background ==
Turnpikes, though common in Britain, were almost unheard of in their American colonies. After they had declared independence, the states' road networks were still in poor condition, often with state and local authorities being unable to effectively maintain their roads. The construction of the first turnpike in America, the Philadelphia and Lancaster Turnpike, sparked a wave of turnpike creation across the northeast. New York followed suit, chartering its first turnpike in 1797. In all, over 450 companies were chartered. Many were chartered to expand access to the state's western regions, others were chartered to be local connections to larger thru-routes, and there were still others meant to connect to other states.

For a turnpike to be created, a company must first have been chartered by the state legislature, as general incorporation law had yet to be widespread in its use. Vetoes of charters were rare, though they were known to happen. A company's charter created the framework for how a company was to operate. To raise capital, companies sold shares of their stock at a fixed rate. Then, the company would set about constructing their road, as prescribed in their charters. The methods of construction could range from a simple dirt road to a toilsome macadam construction. As much as two-thirds of companies in New York were unable to complete their roads in the time allotted by the legislature. However, if a company completed their road, they could begin to collect tolls on their road (or earlier, if allowed by the legislature). Toll booths were erected to accomplish this task, often residential homes with a small booth attached. Tolls varied based on the number of people and livestock travelling, and the type of vehicle travelled in. Exemptions were granted for, among other things, living near a toll booth, going to a house of worship, requesting a physician, or travelling armies. Should a road be not up to standards, gates were to be kept open to travellers until the road was in good condition. Local reaction to a turnpike varied; some communities welcomed a new turnpike, accepting the tolls as a civic duty to be paid, while others resisted by boycotting through shunpikes, lying to escape tolls, or outright vandalism.

The turnpike craze busted as soon as it boomed, challenged by the introduction of steamboats and railroads; the Erie Canal supplanted the need for cross-state turnpikes. Though many long distance turnpikes were doomed, some of the smaller, local turnpikes survived well into the 19th century, with a few surviving into the 20th century. With the introduction of plank roads, the chartering of traditional turnpikes fell out of fashion, with only a few more being chartered. Toll roads had become a memory a few decades into the 20th century, though the 1950s brought about the New York Thruway System, reintroducing toll roads to the state.

== List ==
| Name | | Chartered | Length | Routing | Approximate modern designation | Built? | Notes |
|---|---|---|---|---|---|---|---|
| Albany and Schenectady Turnpike | | April 1, 1797, c. 87; reorganized March 30, 1802, c. 69 | 14 miles (23 km) | Schenectady, Albany | NY 5 | Yes | 1852: Abandoned within Albany |
| Greenville Turnpike | | Unknown | 11.59 miles (18.65 km) | Port Jervis, Greenville, Mt Hope | CR 94 | Yes | |
| First Great Western Turnpike | | March 15, 1799, c. 30 | 52 miles (84 km) | Cherry Valley, Esperance, Duanesburg, Watervliet | US 20 | Yes | Initially founded as the Western Turnpike, April 4, 1798, c. 88. Authorized to extend into Albany 1830. Authorized to abandon the easternmost 8 miles 1847, then within Schoharie and Otsego counties 1853. |
| Columbia Turnpike | | March 29, 1799, c. 69 | 20 miles (32 km) | Hudson, Claverack, Hillsdale, Massachusetts state line | NY 23 (NY 23B) | Yes | Connected to Twelfth Massachusetts Turnpike at east end. Still in operation by 1907, when its toll houses were turned over to the county |
| Rensselaer and Columbia Turnpike | | April 1, 1799, c. 73 | 28 miles (45 km) | Rensselaer, Nassau, Lebanon Springs | US 20 | Yes | Founded as the Albany and Columbia Turnpike, April 5, 1798 (c. 94) to go from the state line at Lebanon Springs to Albany; it charter was repealed in the act that created this turnpike. |
| Eastern Turnpike | | April 1, 1799, c. 73 | 40 miles (64 km) | Rensselaer, Berlin, Massachusetts | Forbes Avenue, Washington Avenue, NY 43, Taborton Road, Stage Coach Road ... Old Eastern Turnpike Trail ... Upper Stage Coach Road, Old Post Road, Plank Road, Green Hollow Road ... | Yes | Connected to Williamstown Turnpike at east end. Eastern end (Sand Lake to NY/MA state line) declared public in 1824. Authorized to sell remaining section (Sand Lake to Hudson River) to the Albany and Sand Lake Plank Road Company in 1849. |
| Northern Turnpike | Main Road | April 1, 1799, c. 79 | 60 miles (97 km) | Lansingburgh, Cambridge, Salem, Granville | NY 40, Melrose Valley Falls Road, Northern Turnpike, NY 67, Bushwick-Hoosick Road, Stage Road, Turnpike Road, NY 22 | Yes | 1837: Authorized to reroute off Stage Road to Turnpike Road and NY 67. 1846: Authorized to abandon north of Cambridge |
| Northern Turnpike | Branch | April 1, 1799, c. 79 | | Salem, Vermont state line | CR 153 | Yes | |
| Seneca Road Company | Main Road | April 1, 1800, c. 78 | 157 miles (253 km) | Canandaigua, Waterloo, Cayuga, Oneida, Utica | NY 5, NY 173, NY 175, Onondaga CR 133, (Turnpike Road: Mud Lock – Sennett) | Yes | 1845: Abandoned from Canandaigua through Geneva. Authorized to sell or abandon parts of their road 1850, then fully dissolved 1852 |
| Seneca Road Company | North Branch | March 21, 1806, c. 75 | | Chittenango, Syracuse, Cayuga | | | |
| Susquehannah Turnpike | | April 1, 1800, c. 79 | 80 miles (130 km) | Salisbury, CT, Catskill, Cairo, Durham, Gilboa, Stamford, Treadwell, Unadilla | State Line Road, Dutchess CR 60, CR 8, NY 82, US 9, Church Road, Greendale Road, Main Street, NY 145, CR 20, Durham Road, Potter Mountain Road, NY 990V, Gilboa Road, NY 23, Turnpike Road, Delhi–Leonta Road, NY 357 | Yes | Part of the Catskill Turnpike Road. Portion of the turnpike east of the Hudson spun off as the Ancram Turnpike 1803. Due to lost revenues to competition with the Charlotte Turnpike, was made public west of the intersection of the two 1844, then west of Gilboa 1845 |
| Orange Turnpike | | April 4, 1800, c. 102 | 25 miles (40 km) | Sloatsburg, Monroe | NY 59, NY 17, Orange Turnpike, Greycourt Road, Lehigh Avenue | Yes | 1806: extended south to the New Jersey state line at Suffern to connect to the Franklin Turnpike, and north to Chester |
| Mohawk Turnpike | | April 4, 1800, c. 105 | 80 miles (130 km) | Schenectady, Amsterdam, Fonda, Palatine Bridge, Little Falls, Herkimer, Utica | NY 5 | Yes | Company reformed to spin off bridge at Schenectady 1805 |
| Westchester Turnpike | | April 7, 1800, c. 121 | 10 miles (16 km) | Eastchester, New Rochelle, Mamaroneck, Port Chester, Connecticut state line | US 1 | Yes | Connected to Connecticut Turnpike at north end |
| Newburgh and Cochecton Turnpike | | March 20, 1801, c. 36 | 60 miles (97 km) | Newburgh, Montgomery, Wurtsboro, Monticello, Cochecton, Pennsylvania state line | NY 17K, NY 17, NY 17B, Newburgh Turnpike | Yes | |
| Flushing and Newtown Turnpike | | March 21, 1801, c. 57 | 5 miles (8.0 km) | Flushing, Newtown | NY 25A, 37th Street, Elmhurst Avenue | Yes | |
| Chenango Turnpike | Main Road | March 30, 1801, c. 92 | 65 miles (105 km) | Oxford, Norwich, Sherburne, Hamilton, Sangerfield, Paris, Whitestown | East River Road, NY 12, NY 12B, Madison CR 83, US 20, NY 12 | Yes | Abandoned a few years after construction. Later known as Oxford and Chenango Turnpike |
| Chenango Turnpike | Branch | April 4, 1803, c. 85 | | Oxford, Wattle's Ferry | Chenango CR 35, NY 8, NY 7 | Yes | Was to be later incorporated into the Oxford Turnpike |
| Oneida Turnpike | | March 31, 1801, c. 94 | 25 miles (40 km) | Vernon, Peterboro, Cazenovia | Peterboro Road, Cody Road | Yes | |
| Union Turnpike | | April 3, 1801, c. 118 | 30 miles (48 km) | Hudson, New Lebanon | NY 66, NY 295, New Concord Road, Frisbee Street, Columbia CR 5, Old Hudson Turnpike, Columbia CR 30, NY 22 | Yes | |
| Stephentown Turnpike | | April 3, 1801, c. 119 | 10 miles (16 km) | Stephentown, Rensselaer and Columbia Turnpike | Rensselaer CR 26 | Yes | Decommissioned November 12, 1816, c. 11 |
| New-Windsor and Blooming-Grove Turnpike | | April 3, 1801, c. 120 | 10 miles (16 km) | New Windsor, Blooming Grove, Goshen | NY 94, NY 208, Sarah Wells Trail | Yes | |
| Second Great Western Turnpike | | April 4, 1801, c. 150 | 45 miles (72 km) | Cherry Valley, Cooperstown, Sherburne | NY 166, Otsego CR 33, Kraham Road, Chicken Farm Hill Road, Main Street, NY 80 | Yes | |
| Schoharie Kill Bridge Road | | March 30, 1801, c. 150 | | Windham, Susquehannah Turnpike | NY 23 | Yes | Locally known as the Windham Turnpike. 1810: Road clarified, with authorization to run from Cairo and extend to Blenheim |
| Quaker Hill Turnpike | | March 30, 1802, c. 66 | 10 miles (16 km) | New Fairfield, Connecticut, Beekman | | No | |
| Troy and Schenectady Turnpike | | April 2, 1802, c. 95 | 15 miles (24 km) | Troy, Schenectady | NY 7 | Yes | Made public 1844 |
| Hudson Branch Turnpike | | April 2, 1802, c. 96 | 10 miles (16 km) | Hudson, Livingston (including later Taghkanic) | US 9 | Yes | Road made public 1827 |
| Ulster and Delaware Turnpike | | April 2, 1802, c. 98 | 110 miles (180 km) | Connecticut state line, Millerton, Pine Plains, Rhinebeck, Kingston, Delhi, Walton, Bainbridge | Beilke Road, NY 199, Salisbury Turnpike, NY 308, NY 28, NY 10, NY 206 | Yes | Connected to Salisbury and Canaan Turnpike at east end |
| Dutchess Turnpike | Main Road | April 2, 1802, c. 111 | 35 miles (56 km) | Poughkeepsie, Pleasant Valley, Millbrook, Amenia, Connecticut state line | US 44, NY 343 | Yes | Connected to Goshen and Sharon Turnpike at east end. Authorized to be planked 1851. |
| Dutchess Turnpike | Branch | April 2, 1802, c. 111 | 7 miles (11 km) | Millbrook, Dover Plains | NY 343 | Yes | |
| Schoharie Turnpike | Full Road (1802-1807) | April 5, 1802, c. 113 | 60 miles (97 km) | Athens, Freehold, Oak Hill, Middleburgh, Cherry Valley | Schoharie Turnpike, NY 145, Lawyersville Road, Looenburgh Turnpike, New York 10, Luenbergh 2/3, Chestnut Street | Yes | Split into the Eastern Branch and Western Branch on March 13, 1807 |
| Schoharie Turnpike | Eastern Branch (post-1807) | March 13, 1807, c. 30 | 30 miles (48 km) | Athens, Freehold, Livingstonville | Schoharie Turnpike, NY 145 | Yes | Western 10 miles abandoned 1834, then abandoned west of the Potic River 1844 |
| Schoharie Turnpike | Western Branch (post-1807) | March 13, 1807 | 35 miles (56 km) | Livingstonville, Oak Hill, Middleburgh, Cherry Valley | NY 145, Lawyersville Road, Looenburgh Turnpike, New York 10, Luenbergh 2/3, Chestnut Street | Yes | Abandoned north of Cobleskill 1849, then north of Middleburgh 1852. |
| Canandaigua and Bath Turnpike | | April 2, 1803, c. 77 | 35 miles (56 km) | Canandaigua, Gorham, Middlesex, Bath | NY 364, NY 245, NY 21, NY 371, NY 415 | Probably not | |
| Third Great Western Turnpike | | April 4, 1803, c. 84 | 90 miles (140 km) | Manlius, Cherry Valley | NY 92, US 20 | Yes | |
| Ancram Turnpike | | April 2, 1803, c. 26 | 90 miles | Livingston, Salisbury, CT | State Line Road, Dutchess CR 60, CR 8, NY 82, US 9, Church Road, Greendale Road | Yes | Created from the Susquehanna Turnpike east of the Delaware River |
| Highland Turnpike | | March 24, 1804, c. 32 | 110 miles (180 km) | Mount Pleasant, Peekskill, Fishkill | US 9 | No | Repealed April 2, 1806 in the act that created the second Highland Turnpike |
| Susquehannah and Bath Turnpike | | April 7, 1804, c. 71 | 100 miles (160 km) | Jericho, Ithaca, Watkins Glen, Bath | NY 206, NY 79, Schuyler CR 23, Steuben CR 114, Steuben CR 87, NY 54 | Yes | Part of the Catskill Turnpike. Authorized to terminate at Ithaca if necessary 1808. Made public through Tompkins County 1838, then fully public 1839 |
| Albany and Bethlehem Turnpike | | April 9, 1804, c. 11 | 5 miles (8.0 km) | Albany, Glenmont | NY 32, NY 144 | Yes | |
| Fall-hill Turnpike | | April 9, 1804, c. 97 | 15 miles (24 km) | Minden, German Flatts | NY 5S | Partly | The only part built was a toll bridge at Little Falls, turned over to Hermiker County 1823 |
| Chatham Turnpike | Main Road | April 10, 1804, c. 106 | 10 miles (16 km) | Malden Bridge, Old Chatham, East Chatham | Albany Turnpike | No | |
| Chatham Turnpike | East Branch | April 10, 1804, c. 106 | | East Chatham, Chatham-Canaan town line | Columbia CR 9 | No | |
| Chatham Turnpike | West Branch | April 10, 1804, c. 106 | | East Chatham, New Concord | Albany Turnpike | No | |
| Coxsackie Turnpike | | March 2, 1805, c. 76 | 25 miles (40 km) | Coxsackie Landing, Climax, Freehold | NY 385, NY 81 (Greene CR 26) (CR 75), CR 27, Stonitch Road | Yes | Abandoned west of Greenville 1828. |
| Albany and Delaware Turnpike | | March 2, 1805, c. 26 | 75 miles (121 km) | Albany, Rensselaerville, Bristol, North Blenheim, Otego | Delaware Avenue, Delaware Turnpike, Albany CR 353, Schoharie CR 19A, CR 19, Campbell Road, Kniskern Road ... Dave Brown Mountain Road | Yes | 1809: limits contracted, supposedly to North Blenheim. Road west from there never constructed, but was surveyed and later used by the Blenheim, Jefferson, and Harpersfield TP |
| Little Delaware Turnpike | | March 16, 1805, c. 36 | 60 miles (97 km) | Catskill, Palenville, Tannersville, Prattsville | NY 23A, NY 23, NY 30, Lower Meeker Hollow Road, Crescent Valley Road, Delaware CR 6, NY 28 | Partly | Intended to reach Delhi, but the company folded before the road could be built. The road east of Hunter was later maintained by the Hunter Turnpike Company with much more success |
| Lake Erie Turnpike | | March 28, 1805, c. 57 | 60 miles (97 km) | Bath, Hornell, Angelica, Jamestown, Lake Erie | Steuben CR 10, Turnpike Road, NY 21, Turnpike Road, Karr Valley Road, Main Street, Old State Road, Allegeny CR 41 | Partly | Incomplete beyond Angelica. Made public 1832 |
| Fourth Great Western Turnpike | | March 28, 1805, c. 56 | 30 miles (48 km) | Sherburne, Fabius | NY 80, Chenango CR 16, Madison CR 58, NY 13, Lighthouse Hill Road, Albany Street | Yes | Later extended to Homer. Authorized to abandon the road in Chenango and Madison counties 1850. |
| Hillsdale and Chatham Turnpike | | April 2, 1805, c. 64 | 20 miles (32 km) | Massachusetts state line in Hillsdale, Albany | NY 71, Dugway Road, NY 203, NY 66, Columbia CR 17, Bunker Hill Road, US 20 | Yes | Dissolved by Court Order 1840-05-15 |
| Cayuga Turnpike | | April 2, 1805, c. 68 | 120 miles (190 km) | Burlington, New Berlin, Norwich, Homer, Cayuga | | No | |
| Ontario and Genesee Turnpike | | April 2, 1805, c. 69 | 90 miles (140 km) | Canandaigua, Bloomfield, Le Roy, Batavia, Black Rock | NY 5 | Yes | |
| Onondaga Salt Spring Turnpike | | April 4, 1805, c. 73 | 55 miles (89 km) | Oxford, Norwich, Syracuse | | Maybe | |
| Great Northern Turnpike | | April 4, 1805, c. 76 | 130 miles (210 km) | Kingsbury, Schroon Lake, New Russia, Elizabethtown, Canadian border | US 9 | Yes | |
| Delaware Road | | April 6, 1805, c. 85 | 50 miles (80 km) | Grand Gorge, Delhi, Walton | | No | |
| (Road of the) Walleboght and Brooklyn Toll Bridge Company | | April 6, 1805, c. 86 | 1 mile (1.6 km) | Brooklyn | Flushing Ave (Hudson Ave to Marcy Ave) | Yes | Spelling later standardised to the Wallabout and Brooklyn Toll Bridge |
| Newburgh and Chenango Turnpike | | April 6, 1805, c. 89 | 80 miles (130 km) | Oxford, Jericho, Deposit, Hancock, Cochecton | | No | |
| Neversink Turnpike | | April 6, 1805, c. 89 | 80 miles (130 km) | Chenango Point, Oquaga, Cook House, Liberty, Neversink, Wawarsing, Rochester, Marbletown, Hurley, Old Mine Road, Kingston | Lucas Avenue (extended), Lucas Turnpike, US 209, NY 55 ... Bradley Road, Tanzman Road, Old Route 17 | Incomplete W of the Delaware | Renamed First Great South Western Turnpike 1817 c. 134. Part in Ulster County made public 1826, c. 238. Locally known as Lucas Elmendorf's Turnpike, after its primary progenitor. Listed as end of Liberty and Bethel Branch TP. Reincorporated as Rondout and Beaverkill Turnpike, 1836 c. 522. |
| Popacton Turnpike | | April 6, 1805, c. 89 | 90 miles (140 km) | Kingston, Hurley, Walton | | No | |
| Plattsburgh and Chateauguay Turnpike | | April 8, 1805, c. 92 | 40 miles (64 km) | Plattsburgh, Chateauguay | | No | |
| Utica Turnpike | | April 10, 1805, c. 125 | 30 miles (48 km) | Deerfield, Trenton, Steuben | NY 12 | Yes | Opened in part on December 23, 1811, and fully opened 1815. Road sold off in 1848. |
| Rome Turnpike | | April 10, 1805, c. 125 | 20 miles (32 km) | Rome, Oneida Castle | | No | Not to be confused with a later Rome Turnpike |
| Greenfield Turnpike | | March 14, 1806, c. 49 | 35 miles (56 km) | Rensselaerville, Greenfield | Greene CR 38, Albany CR 405, CR 402, CR 351 | Yes | Extension to Coxsackie Turnpike 1807–1820. Charter repealed 1837. |
| Farmers' Turnpike | | March 14, 1806, c. 50 | 35 miles (56 km) | Troy, Bath, Greenbush, Papsknee, Castleton, Schodac, Kinderhook Landing, Hudson | | Partially. Hudson north to Bath completed. | Authorized to relenquish the road for public use on April 14th, 1827.. Not to be confused with the second Farmers' Turnpike incorporated in 1808. |
| Waterford and Whitehall Turnpike | | March 28, 1806, c. 87 | 60 miles (97 km) | Waterford, Stillwater, Sandy Hill, Fort Ann, Whitehall, West Haven, VT | US 4 | Yes | |
| Newburgh and New-Windsor Turnpike | | April 2, 1806, c. 91 | 5 miles (8.0 km) | Newburgh, New Windsor | River Road | Yes | |
| Schenectady and Ballstown Turnpike | | April 2, 1806, c. 97 | 5 miles (8.0 km) | Schenectady, Ballston line | | No | |
| Unadilla Turnpike | | April 2, 1806, c. 98 | 40 miles (64 km) | Otego, Chenango Point | NY 7 | Probably not | |
| Jamaica and Rockaway Turnpike | | April 2, 1806, c. 103 | 15 miles (24 km) | Lawrence, Jamaica | Rockaway Turnpike, Rockaway Boulevard, Stuphin Boulevard | Yes | |
| Canajoharie and Charleston Turnpike | | April 2, 1806, c. 111 | 20 miles (32 km) | Canajoharie, Duanesburgh | | No | |
| Hamilton and Skaneateles Turnpike | | April 2, 1806, c. 112 | 70 miles (110 km) | Richfield Springs, Plainfield, Leonardsville, Brookfield, Hamilton, Fabius, Tully, Marietta, Skaneateles | | Yes | Made public 1847 |
| Highland Turnpike | | April 2, 1806, c. 119 | 20 miles (32 km) | Kingsbridge, Poughkeepsie, Rhinebeck, Clermont, Hudson | Albany Post Road, Blue Hill Road, Middle Road, NY 23B | Yes | Charter repealed 1833 |
| New-Baltimore and Rensselaerville Turnpike | | April 2, 1806, c. 123 | 20 miles (32 km) | New Baltimore, Rensselaerville | New Baltimore Road, Aquetuck Road, NY 143 | Yes | Authorized to sell 1850 |
| Mohawk Bridge and Ballstown Turnpike | | April 2, 1806, c. 113 | 20 miles (32 km) | Niskayuna, Burnt Hills | Balltown Road, Blue Barns Road | Yes | |
| Waterford Turnpike | | April 4, 1806, c. 145 | 40 miles (64 km) | Waterford, Halfmoon, Clifton Park, Jonesville | Middletown Road, Guideboard Road, Plant Road, Plank Road, Kinns Road, Carlton Road, Main Street | Maybe | Charter amended 1810, c. 92 |
| Mexico Turnpike | | April 4, 1806, c. 154 | 50 miles (80 km) | Mexico Point, Rotterdam, Cleveland, Camden, Rome | | No | |
| Middleburgh and Rensselaerville Turnpike | | April 4, 1806, c. 155 | 15 miles (24 km) | Middleburgh, Rensselaerville | | No | |
| Albany and Greene Turnpike | | April 7, 1806, c. 164 | 35 miles (56 km) | Glenmont, Coeymans Landing, Athens, Catskill | NY 144, Main Street, River Road ... Riverside Avenue, Mansion Street, Ely Street, NY 385 | Yes | 1838: Made public within Catskill. 1852: Made public from Albany to Coxsackie |
| Essex Turnpike | | April 3, 1807, c. 101 | | Grog Harbour, Willsborough, Great Northern Turnpike | Albee Road, Lakeshore Road, NY 22 | No | |
| Owego and Ithaca Turnpike | | April 6, 1807, c. 153 | 29 miles (47 km) | Owego, Ithaca | NY 96, NY 96B | Yes | Made public 1840 |
| Otsego and Broome Turnpike | | April 6, 1807, c. 159 | | Otego, Susquehannah and Bath Turnpike | | No | |
| Salina and Chenango Turnpike | | April 6, 1807, c. 160 | 80 miles (129 km) | Salina Village, Onondaga Hollow, Tully, Homer, Virgil, Cincinnatus, Lisle, Chenango Point | US 11 | Yes | |
| Lake George Turnpike | | April 6, 1807, c. 163 | | Fort Ann, Ticonderoga, Elizabethtown north line | | No | |
| Croton Turnpike | Westchester County | April 6, 1807, c. 167 | 18 miles (29 km) | Westchester-Dutchess county line, Stephentown | NY 133, NY 100, US 202 | Yes | March 18, 1808, c. 55: extended south to Ossining. Charter repealed 1851 |
| Croton Turnpike | Dutchess County | April 8, 1811, c. 169 | 14 miles (23 km) | Westchester-Dutchess county line, Brewster, Patterson, Connecticut state line | US 202, NY 22, Haviland Hollow Road | Yes | 1835: Abandoned within Southeast |
| Saugerties and Woodstock Turnpike | | April 7, 1807, c. 172 | | Saugerties, Little Shandaken, Ulster and Delaware Turnpike | NY 212 | Yes | Referenced as end of the Woodstock Branch Turnpike. Not to be confused with two later companies of the same name |
| New Paltz Turnpike | | April 7, 1807, c. 175 | | New Paltz Landing, New Paltz, Southwest Turnpike | NY 299 | No | The final alignment wasn't stated in its first charter, but rather was set in an 1820 amendment |
| Rensselaerville and Durham Turnpike | | March 4, 1808, c. 31 | 8 miles (13 km) | Durham, Rensselaerville, Albany and Delaware Turnpike | Niles Road, Gerard Road, Barger Road ... Willsey Road, Albany CR 361 | Yes | Made public 1837 |
| Great Bend and Bath Turnpike | | March 11, 1808, c. 41 | 115 miles (185 km) | Cochecton and Great Bend Turnpike, Chenango Point, Owego, Newtown, Bath | US 11, NY 17C, Chemung CR 60, NY 352, NY 415 | Yes | |
| Farmer's Turnpike | | March 11, 1808, c. 46 | 14 miles (23 km) | Gardiner, Milton | US 44, Milton Turnpike | Yes | |
| Claverack and Hillsdale Turnpike | | March 18, 1808, c. 56 | | Massachusetts state line at Hillsdale, Claverack | | No | |
| Canaan and Union Village Turnpike | | March 25, 1808, c. 65 | 17 miles (27 km) | West Stockbridge-Canaan line, Stewards, Chatham, Union | Flint's Crossing Road, NY 22, Peaceful Valley Road, Frisbee Street, Albany Turnpike | Yes | Charter amended 1827 |
| Bowman's Creek Turnpike | | March 25, 1808, c. 66 | | Minden, Bowman's Creek, Charleston, Great Western Turnpike | | No | |
| Traveller's Turnpike | | March 25, 1808, c. 79 | | Rensselaer and Columbia Turnpike, Kinderhook, Claverack | | No | |
| Schoharie and Duanesburgh Turnpike | | March 25, 1808, c. 83 | 12 miles (19 km) | Schoharie, Quaker Street, Duanesburgh | NY 7, Schoharie Turnpike | Yes | |
| Bristol and Rensselaerville Turnpike | | March 25, 1808, c. 89 | 7 miles (11 km) | Bristol, Rensselaerville | Potter Mountain Road, Potter Hollow Road | Yes | |
| Stamford Turnpike | | April 1, 1808, c. 104 | | Roxbury, Stamford | | No | |
| Windham Turnpike | | April 1, 1808, c. 112 | | Windham, Acra | | Yes | A rather unprofitable venture, and likely didn't last long |
| Catskill Ferry Turnpike | | April 1, 1808, c. 114 | | Catskill-Greenport Ferry, Claverack | | No | |
| Beekman and Pawling's Turnpike | | April 1, 1808, c. 123 | | Pawlings, Poughkeepsie | | No | Not to be confused with the Pawlings and Beekman Turnpike |
| Military Turnpike | | April 6, 1808, c. 128 | | Ithaca, Oxford | | No | |
| Middletown Turnpike | | April 6, 1808, c. 153 | | Middletown, Roxbury | NY 30 | Maybe | |
| Oneida and Jefferson Turnpike | | April 8, 1808, c. 158 | | Rome, Redfield, Malta, Putnam's Ferry | | No | Not to be confused with a second Oneida and Jefferson Turnpike |
| Norwich and Preston Turnpike | | April 8, 1808, c. 161 | 5 miles (8.0 km) | Norwich, Preston | | Maybe | |
| Aurora Turnpike | | April 8, 1808, c. 190 | | Montezuma, Cayuga, Levanna, Aurora, Ithaca | | No | |
| Green River Turnpike | | April 11, 1808, c. 195 | | Hudson, Claverack, Hillsdale, Massachusetts state line at West Stockbridge | | No | |
| Pine Plains Turnpike | | April 11, 1808, c. 196 | | Pine Plains, Gallatin | | No | |
| Cook-house and Jerico Turnpike | | April 11, 1808, c. 197 | | Tompkins, Jericho | | No | |
| Sherburne and Lebanon Salt Spring Turnpike | | April 11, 1808, c. 197 | 23 miles (37 km) | Norwich, Eaton | Main Street, Bingham Road, Lawrence Road, West Hill Road, Chenango CR 14, Madison CR 74 | Yes | |
| Jerico and Norwich Turnpike | | April 11, 1808, c. 197 | | Jericho, Norwich | | No | |
| Ulster and Orange Branch Turnpike | | April 11, 1808, c. 198 | 36 miles (58 km) | Montgomery, Roosa Pass, Liberty | Corbett Road, Winding Hill Road, Youngblood Road, Collabar Road, Orange CR 17, CR 48, Ski Run Road, Pickles Road, Ferguson Road, Summitville Road, Mount Vernon Road, New Road, Old Turnpike Road, Mountain Dale Road, Broadway, Roosevelt Avenue, Old Falls Road, Brickman Road, Seldon Road, Hilldale Road, Cross Road, NY 52 | Yes | 1811, c. 73: authorized to extend west to West Branch Delaware River, though never completed 1833, c. 123: part from Liberty to Mamakating made public |
| Goshen and Wallkill Turnpike | | April 11, 1808, c. 199 | 13 miles (21 km) | Goshen, Bloomingburg | Old Minisink Trail, Scotchtown Avenue, Goshen Turnpike | Yes | Dissolved 1819 |
| Cortlandt Turnpike | | February 10, 1809, c. 25 | | Somers, Cortlandt | | No | |
| Minisink and Montgomery Turnpike | | February 17, 1809, c. 30 | 28 miles (45 km) | New Jersey state line at Carpenter's Point, Deerpark, Middletown, Montgomery | Neversink Drive, Shinhollow Road ... Old Stage Road, Gumyard Turnpike, Mount Hope Road, W Main Street, NY 211 | Yes | 1819: Abandoned east of Middletown 1843: Abandoned east of Shawangunk Mountain |
| Woodstock Branch Turnpike | | February 17, 1809, c. 41 | | Kingston, Saugerties and Woodstock Turnpike | | Maybe | |
| Mountain Turnpike | | March 17, 1809, c. 70 | | Rensselaerwyck, North Blenheim, Albany and Delaware TP | | Yes | Referenced as end point of Durham and Broome TP. Made public |
| Charlotte River Turnpike | | March 17, 1809, c. 70 | | Oneonta, Susquehanna Turnpike | NY 28, NY 357 | Yes | Road later turned over to Otego Turnpike Company |
| Windham and Durham Turnpike | | March 17, 1809, c. 71 | | Windham, Durham | | No | |
| Brooklyn, Jamaica and Flatbush Turnpike | Main Road | March 17, 1809, c. 74 | 11 miles (18 km) | Fulton Ferry, Jamaica | Old Fulton Street, Cadman Plaza West, Fulton Street (Flatbush Avenue, Hanson Place), Jamaica Avenue | Yes | Turned over to Jamaica and Brooklyn Plank Road Company 1851 |
| Brooklyn, Jamaica and Flatbush Turnpike | Branch | March 17, 1809, c. 74 | 3 miles (4.8 km) | Brooklyn Heights, Flatbush | Flatbush Avenue | Yes | |
| Athens Turnpike | | March 24, 1809, c. 81 | 5 miles (8.0 km) | Athens, Leeds | Leeds-Athens Road, Church Road | Yes | |
| Utica and Minden Turnpike | | March 24, 1809, c. 96 | Over 25 miles (40 km) | Utica, Litchfield, Columbia, Warren, Stark, Minden | Albany Road ... Norton Road, Jerusalem Hill Road, Cedarville Road, Jordanville Road ... | Partly | Company folded before completion |
| Rockland Turnpike | | March 27, 1809, c. 129 | | Monroe, Haverstraw | | No | Later built as New Antrim and Waynesburgh TP |
| Dunderbergh and Clove Turnpike | | March 27, 1809, c. 130 | 11 miles (18 km) | Jones Point, Doodletown, Lower Smith Clove | River Road, US 9W, Old Dunderberg Road, Seven Lakes Drive, US 6 | Yes | |
| Goshen and Minisink Turnpike | | March 27, 1809, c. 132 | 20 miles (32 km) | Carpenter's Point, Goshen | Minisink Avenue, (Old) Greenville Turnpike, US 6 (Orange CR 56), Maple Avenue, Police Highway, West Main Street | Yes | |
| Eastern Union Turnpike | | March 28, 1809, c. 146 | 13 miles (21 km) | Hancock-Stephentown line, Sand Lake | NY 43, Eastern Union Turnpike | Yes | 1851: Abandoned from Stephentown to Alps |
| New-Windsor and Cornwall Turnpike | | March 30, 1809, c. 171 | 5 miles (8.0 km) | Monroe, Canterbury, New Windsor | US 9W, Sloop Hill Road, Faculty Road, Main Street, Angola Road, Long Hill Road, NY 32, NY 17 | Yes | |
| Owego Turnpike | | March 30, 1809, c. 177 | | | | Yes | Amended several times |
| Angelica and Allegany Turnpike | | February 8, 1810, c. 1 | | Angelica, Allegany River | | No | |
| Middle Patent Turnpike | | February 17, 1810, c. 11 | | Bedford, North Castle, Greenwich line | | No | |
| Bedford Turnpike | | February 17, 1810, c. 13 | | Ridgefield line, Bedford, North Castle, Connecticut state line | | No | |
| Warwick and Minisink Turnpike | | March 2, 1810, c. 28 | 19 miles (31 km) | Vernon-Warwick line, Amity, Goshen and Minisink TP | Warwick Turnpike, Hoyt Road, NY 94, Fancher Road, Covered Bridge Road, Sutton Road ... Walling Road, Newport Bridge Road, Furman Lane, Liberty Corners Road, Oil City Road, State Line Road, NY 284, Main Street, Pine Hill Road, Minisink Turnpike | Yes | Made public east of Pine Island 1832 |
| Ulster and Delaware First Branch Turnpike | | March 9, 1810, c. 30 | 25 miles (40 km) | Hudson River, Platekill, Little Shandaken, Middletown | | Yes | |
| Westchester and Dutchess Turnpike | | March 9, 1810, c. 47 | Over 20 miles (32 km) | Cortlandt, Philipstown, Frederick | N Division Street, Oregon Road, Peekskill Hollow Turnpike, Peekskill Hollow Road, New York 301, Miller Hill Road, | Yes | 1820, c. 179: Authorized to extend over Fishkill Mountain |
| Bellvale Turnpike | | March 9, 1810, c. 48 | 9 miles (14 km) | Bellvale, Monroe | NY 17A | Yes | |
| Ithaca and Geneva Turnpike | | March 19, 1810, c. 69 | 50 miles (80 km) | Ithaca, Tremain's Village, Ovid, Geneva | State Street, NY 96, NY 96A | Yes | |
| Durham and Broome Turnpike | | March 23, 1810, c. 75 | | Durham, Rensselaerville, Broome | | No | |
| Walton and Franklin Turnpike | | March 23, 1810, c. 78 | | Franklin, Walton | | No | |
| Paris and Bridgewater Turnpike | | March 23, 1810, c. 79 | | Litchfield, Bridgewater, Paris, Westmoreland | | No | |
| Newburgh and Sullivan Turnpike | | March 30, 1810, c. 102 | 21 miles (34 km) | Newburgh, New Hurley, Sam's Point, Fallsburg | Water Street, Leroy Place, North Street, Plank Road, NY 32, NY 300, Strawridge Road, Bordens Road, NY 208, Wallkill Avenue, Bruyn Avenue, Indian Springs Road, Oregon Trail | Yes | 1811, c. 167: authorized to extend west to the Orange and Ulster Branch TP, though the road seems only to be built as far as Sam's Point |
| Little Falls and Fairfield Turnpike | | March 30, 1810, c. 106 | | Little Falls, Fairfield | | No | |
| Whitehall and Granville Turnpike | | April 2, 1810, c. 116 | | Whitehall, Granville | | No | Resurrected in 1812 with a somewhat different membership |
| Cambridge Branch Turnpike | | April 2, 1810, c. 118 | | Cambridge, Shaftsbury line | | No | |
| St. Lawrence Turnpike | | April 2, 1810, c. 124 | Over 80 miles (130 km) | Wilna, Russell, Bangor | U.S. Military Highway, Russell Turnpike, Lewisburg Road, Russell Turnpike, St. Lawrence County Route 24, CR 58, NY 72, NY 11B | Yes | Locally called the Russell turnpike |
| Newburgh and Plattekill Turnpike | | April 5, 1810, c. 162 | | Newburgh, Plattekill | | N | Listed as endpoint of Plattekill-Marlborough TP. A new company was formed 1812 by mostly the same associates |
| Mohawk and Black River Turnpike | | April 5, 1810, c. 167 | | Rome, Turin | | No | |
| Bath and Geneva Turnpike | | April 5, 1810, c. 173 | | Bath, Penn Yan, Geneva | | No | |
| Hadley and Luzerne Turnpike | | April 6, 1810, c. 195 | | Hadley, Great Falls | | No | |
| Plattekill and Marlborough Turnpike | | February 16, 1811, c. 9 | 8 miles (13 km) | Newburgh, Plattekill, Newburgh and Plattekill Turnpike | | Yes | Follows the route of the Huckleberry Turnpike |
| Southern Westchester Turnpike | | March 22, 1811, c. 63 | | Town of Westchester, Westchester Village | | No | Not to be confused with a later Southern Westchester Turnpike opened in the 1860s |
| Washington and Saratoga Turnpike | | March 30, 1811, c. 91 | | Montgomery-Saratoga county line, Saratoga Springs, Greenwich, Vermont | | No | |
| Black River and Sackett's Harbor Turnpike Company | Black River Turnpike | March 30, 1811, c. 92 | | Brownville, Munger's Mills, Watertown, Lowville | | No | |
| Black River and Sackett's Harbor Turnpike Company | Sackett's Harbor Turnpike | March 30, 1811, c. 92 | | Munger's Mills, Sacket's Harbor | | No | |
| Portage Turnpike | | April 8, 1811, c. 176 | 8 miles (13 km) | Lake Erie, Lake Chatauqua | NY 394 | Probably | |
| Spencer and Seneca Turnpike | | April 8, 1811, c. 177 | | Candor, Spencer, Catherine, Watkins Glen | | No | |
| Madison County Turnpike | | April 8, 1811, c. 179 | 23 miles (37 km) | Eaton, Peterboro, Chittenango | | Yes | |
| Lebanon Turnpike | | April 8, 1811, c. 182 | | Deruyter, Lebanon, Hamilton | | No | |
| Great Bend and Union Turnpike | | April 8, 1811, c. 183 | | Pennsylvania line, Chenango Point, Union | | No | |
| Balltown and Saratoga Spring Turnpike | | April 8, 1811, c. 184 | | Ballstown Spa, Saratoga Springs | | No | |
| Lewis Turnpike | | April 8, 1811, c. 187 | | Steuben, Boonville, Turin, Martinsburgh, Lowville | | No | |
| Narrowsburgh and Sullivan Turnpike | | April 8, 1811, c. 193 | | Narrowsburgh, Bethel | | Yes? | |
| Manlius and Truxton Turnpike | | April 9, 1811, c. 194 | | Manlius, Fabius, Truxton | | No | |
| Deruyter and Eaton Turnpike | | April 9, 1811, c. 204 | | Deruyter, Eaton, Madison | | No | |
| Bethel Branch Turnpike | | April 9, 1811, c. 213 | | Narrowsburgh, Newburgh and Cochecton | | No | |
| Bridgewater and Litchfield Branch Turnpike | | April 9, 1811, c. 218 | | Litchfield, Bridgewater | | No | |
| Canandaigua, Palmyra and Pultneyville Turnpike | | April 9, 1811, c. 230 | | Canandaigua, Palmyra, Pultneyville | | No | |
| Tioga Turnpike | | April 9, 1811, c. 247 | | Richford, Owego | | No | |
| LeRaysville Turnpike | | February 21, 1812, c. 11 | | Watertown, Le Raysville, Diana | | No | |
| Cape Vincent Turnpike | | February 21, 1812, c. 11 | | Chaumont, Cape Vincent | | No | Not to be confused for a later Cape Vincent Turnpike, chartered three years later by the same company |
| Hempstead Turnpike | | March 20, 1812, c. 37 | 9 miles (14 km) | Jamaica Village, Hempstead | Jamaica Avenue, Hempstead Avenue, NY 24 | Yes | |
| Union Turnpike | | May 25, 1812, c. 40 | | New Jersey state line at Minisink, Old Minisink Road, Minisink and Montgomery TP | | No | |
| Goshen and West Town Turnpike | | June 1, 1812, c. 70 | | New Jersey state line at Unionville, Westtown, Johnson, Goshen | | No | |
| Ogdensburg Turnpike | | June 8, 1812, c. 79 | 53 miles (85 km) | Le Ray, Antwerp, Rossie, Morristown, Ogdensburg | Military Highway, US 11, Jefferson CR 24, CR 25, St. Lawrence CR 3, NY 37 | Yes | |
| Mount Hope and Lumberland Turnpike | | June 8, 1812, c. 112 | 34 miles (55 km) | Wallkill, Deerpark, Forestburgh, Narrowsburgh | Mount Hope Road, Highland Avenue, Main Street ... Galley Hill Road, Horse Shoe Bend Road, NY 211, Oakland Valley Road, Hartwood Road, Sullivan CR 43 ... Old Lumberland Turnpike ... Blind Pond Road, Sullivan CR 23, NY 97 | Yes | |
| Merritt's Island Turnpike | | June 8, 1812, c. 119 | 4 miles (6.4 km) | Crossing the Black Dirt Region in Warwick, through Pine Island | Pine Island Turnpike | Yes | |
| Cazenovia and German Turnpike | | June 10, 1812, c. 124 | | Cazenovia, German | | No | Some talks in 1814 of the town of Cazenovia purchasing a controlling majority of the company's stock |
| Cayuga and Susquehanna Turnpike | | June 10, 1812, c. 127 | | Ithaca, Owego, Pennsylvania state line | Montrose Avenue, Montrose Turnpike (in part) | Yes | Connected to Milford and Owego TP at south end. Made public 1835 |
| Hamilton Turnpike | | June 12, 1812, c. 138 | | Hamilton, Madrid | | No | |
| Newburgh and Plattekill Turnpike | | June 12, 1812, c. 141 | 14 miles (23 km) | Newburgh, Plattekill | Gidney Avenue, Gardnertown Road, Plattekill Turnpike, NY 300, NY 32, Plattekill-Ardonia Road | Yes | A reformation of an 1810 company. Made public 1853 |
| Cortland and Seneca Turnpike | | June 12, 1812, c. 142 | 17 miles (27 km) | Homer, Ithaca | NY 13, NY 366, Forest Home Drive, University Avenue | Yes | |
| Delaware Turnpike | | June 12, 1812, c. 148 | | Narrowsburgh, Snook's Ridge | | No | |
| Cairo and East Kill Turnpike | | June 15, 1812, c. 156 | 22 miles (35 km) | Cairo, Windham | Mountain Avenue, South Road, Maple Lawn Road, Storks Nest Road, Dutcher Notch Trail, Colgate Lake Trail, Colgate Road, Greene CR 23C, Jewett Heights Road | Yes | |
| Eagle Village Turnpike | | June 15, 1812, c. 159 | | Manlius, Cazenovia | | No | |
| Sacondaga Turnpike | | June 15, 1812, c. 160 | 26 miles (42 km) | Scotia, Fish House | NY 147, NY 29, Fish House Road, Fulton CR 109 | Yes | |
| Nelson and DeRuyter Turnpike | | June 15, 1812, c. 161 | | Nelson, Deruyter | | No | |
| Chenango Turnpike | | June 15, 1812, c. 162 | 7 miles (11 km) | Pennsylvania state line, Chenango Point | ... Park Avenue, Cross Street, Pennsylvania Avenue | Yes | |
| Whitehall and Granville Turnpike | | June 19, 1812, c. 202 | 26 miles (42 km) | Whitehall, Granville | Williams Street, Washington CR 12, Upper Turnpike, NY 22, Old State 22, Washington CR 24, North Street | Yes | Resurrected from 1810 company. Southern 5 miles abandoned 1823. Still relevant by 1856 |
| Peekskill Turnpike | | June 19, 1812, c. 224 | 5 miles (8.0 km) | Peekskill, Yorktown | US 6, Main Street | Yes | Authorized to make road town-owned 1860, county owned 1867. Locally known as the five-mile turnpike |
| Potsdam and Hopkinton Turnpike | | February 5, 1813, c. 19 | 14 miles (23 km) | Potsdam, Hopkinton | NY 11B | Yes | |
| Parishville Turnpike | | February 5, 1813, c. 20 | 38 miles (61 km) | Parishville, Potsdam, Canton, Ogdensburg | NY 72, Old Potsdam-Parishville Road, Outer Main Street, Main Street, Maple Street, US 11, NY 68 | Yes | |
| Jericho Turnpike | | March 20, 1813, c. 77 | 17 miles (27 km) | Oyster Bay, Jamaica | Jamaica Avenue, NY 25 | Yes | |
| Great Island Turnpike | | April 9, 1813, c. 157 | 11 miles (18 km) | Goshen, Pine Island, New Jersey state line | Liberty Corners Road, Pine Island Turnpike, Pulaski Highway | Yes | Connected to Deckertown and Newton TP at south end. 1841: Authorized to extend north an eighth of a mile from Quaker Creek |
| Dutchess Union Turnpike | | April 9, 1813, c. 162 | | Beekman, Dover, Connecticut state line | | Yes | |
| New Paltz and Plattekill Turnpike | | April 9, 1813, c. 171 | | Newburgh, New Paltz | | No | |
| Scaghticoke Turnpike | | April 12, 1813, c. 188 | | Northern TP, Viele Bridge ... | | Maybe | Existing references could be referring to the Northern TP |
| Blue Mountain Turnpike | | March 11, 1814, c. 35 | | Greenland, Saugerties | | No | |
| Williamsburgh Turnpike | | March 11, 1814, c. 39 | 8 miles (13 km) | Williamsburgh, Jamaica | Metropolitan Avenue | Yes | Made a village-maintained road 1849 in Williamsburgh |
| Newtown Turnpike | | March 25, 1814, c. 61 | 23 miles (37 km) | Newtown, Watkins Glen | Lake Street, Lake Road, Main Street, Watkins Road, NY 14 | Yes | Road made public 1834 |
| Fifth Great Western Turnpike | | March 25, 1814, c. 66 | | Homer, Locke, Genoa | NY 90, Clearview Road | Yes | |
| Roxbury, Blenheim and Broome Turnpike | | March 25, 1814, c. 68 | | Roxbury, Blenheim ... Broome, Mountain Turnpike | | No | |
| Newton and Bushwick Turnpike | | March 25, 1814, c. 72 | 4 miles (6.4 km) | Newtown, Brooklyn | Flushing Avenue (from Marcy Ave) | Yes | Later known as the Brooklyn and Newtown Turnpike. Not to be confused with a similarly named TP that listed this road as an endpoint to a branch of its road |
| New Antrim and Waynesburgh Turnpike | | April 1, 1814, c. 85 | 12 miles (19 km) | New Hempstead, Waynesburg | US 202 | Yes | |
| Princetown Turnpike | | April 6, 1814, c. 93 | | Burton's Bridge, Schenectady | | No | |
| Montgomery Turnpike | | April 9, 1814, c. 111 | | Fort Montgomery, Monroe | | No | |
| Homer and Cayuga Turnpike | | April 15, 1814, c. 147 | | Homer, Cortland | | No | |
| Monticello Turnpike | | April 15, 1814, c. 151 | | Monticello, Liberty | | No | |
| Merritt's Island and West Town Turnpike | | April 15, 1814, c. 182 | | Warwick, Westtown, Greenville | | No | |
| Kaaterskill Turnpike | | April 15, 1814, c. 190 | | Catskill, Cairo | | Yes | |
| New Hamburgh Turnpike | | March 24, 1815, c. 104 | | Fishkill | | Yes | Road made public 1830 |
| Snake Hill Turnpike | | March 24, 1815, c. 110 | 4 miles (6.4 km) | Newburgh, New Windsor | NY 32 | Yes | Made public 1842 |
| Rochester Turnpike | | March 31, 1815, c. 118 | | Rochester, Canandaigua | | No | |
| Cape Vincent Turnpike | | March 31, 1815, c. 119 | 21.5 miles (34.6 km) | Cape Vincent, Brownville | NY 12E | Yes | Road made public 1831 |
| Montezuma Turnpike | | March 31, 1815, c. 120 | 39 miles (63 km) | Throop, Montezuma, Angell's Corners, Marengo, Lyons, Newark, East Palmyra, Palmyra | McDonald Road, Fuller Road, NY 90, NY 31, NY 89, Armitage Road, Tyre Road, Turnpike Road, Lyons-Marengo Road, Montezuma Street, Water Street, Old Lyons Road ... Pearl Street, Tellier Road, Creek Road | Yes | Part of charter repealed 1835, except the bridge over the Seneca River |
| Richmond Turnpike | | March 31, 1815, c. 122 | 8 miles (13 km) | Staten Island Ferry, Chelsea | Victory Boulevard | Yes | |
| Junius Turnpike | | April 7, 1815, c. 132 | 14 miles (23 km) | Cayuga Bridge, Phelps | Balsley Road, North Road, NY 96 | Yes | |
| Throopsville Turnpike | | April 7, 1815, c. 139 | | Skaneateles, Throopsville | | Yes | |
| Phillipstown Turnpike | | April 14, 1815, c. 165 | 25 miles (40 km) | Cold Spring Landing, Patterson | NY 301, Farmer's Mills Road, White Pond Road, Milltown Road, Holmes Road, NY 292, NY 311, NY 22, Birch Hill Road | Yes | 1834: Abandoned east of Haviland's Corners |
| Boonville Turnpike | | April 17, 1815, c. 213 | 18 miles (29 km) | Remsen, Boonville, Leyden | NY 12, NY 12D | Yes | Commencement point for Turin and Leyden TP |
| Salt and Gypsum Turnpike | | April 17, 1815, c. 219 | | Oxford, Norwich, Manlius | | No | |
| Johnstown Turnpike | | April 18, 1815, c. 239 | 21 miles (34 km) | Tribe's Hill, Johnstown, Oppenheim | Stoners' Trail, NY 67, New Turnpike Road | Yes | Folded soon after completion from lack of funds; road from Johnstown to Oppenheim later became Johnstown and Amsterdam TP |
| Cazenovia and Truxton Turnpike | | April 18, 1815, c. 258 | | Truxton, Pompey, Cazenovia | | No | |
| Troy and Sand Lake Turnpike | | February 20, 1816, c. 15 | 10 miles (16 km) | Troy, Wyantskill, Sand Lake | NY 66 | Yes | Reincorportated February 15, 1822, c. 27 |
| Greenbush and Nassau Turnpike | | March 22, 1816, c. 43 | | Greenbush, Burden Lake, Nassau | | No | |
| Oriskany Turnpike | | April 5, 1816, c. 62 | | Eaton, Madison, Augusta, Paris | | No | |
| Spencer and Candor Turnpike | | April 12, 1816, c. 97 | | Spencer, Candor | | No | |
| Catharine and Spencer Turnpike | | April 12, 1816, c. 98 | 23 miles (37 km) | Spencer, Catharine, Newtown Turnpike | NY 34, NY 224 | Yes | |
| Malta and Saratoga Turnpike | | April 12, 1816, c. 100 | | Half Moon, Malta, Saratoga Springs | | No | |
| Ithaca and Hamburgh Turnpike | | April 12, 1816, c. 101 | | Ulysees, Hector, Watkins Glen | | No | |
| Homer and Genoa Turnpike | | April 12, 1816, c. 113 | | Homer, Dryden, Lansing | | Probably not | |
| Chenango and Onondaga Turnpike | | April 12, 1816, c. 181 | | Salina, Fabius, Chenango Point | | No | |
| Junius and Hector Turnpike | | April 17, 1816, c. 185 | | Seneca Falls, Ovid, Hector | | No | |
| Nelson Turnpike | | April 17, 1816, c. 191 | | Eaton, Cazenovia | | No | |
| Blooming Grove and Greycourt Turnpike | | April 17, 1816, c. 213 | 8 miles (13 km) | Blooming Grove, Chester | NY 94 | Yes | |
| Madison County South Branch Turnpike | | April 17. 1816, c. 226 | | Lebanon, Peterboro | | No | |
| Nyack Turnpike | | April 17, 1816, c. 232 | 13 miles (21 km) | Nyack Landing, Hempstead | NY 59 | Yes | |
| Ithaca and Ludlowville Turnpike | | February 21, 1817, c. 49 | | Ithaca, Ludlowville | | No | |
| Niagara and Chautauque Turnpike | | February 28, 1817, c. 63 | | Buffalo, Irving, Canadaway, Portland, Pennsylvania state line | | No | |
| Long Island Turnpike | | February 28, 1817, c. 65 | | Hempstead, Huntington, (Sag Harbor) | | No | |
| Block House and Port Glasgow Turnpike | | March 10, 1817, c. 73 | | Canandaigua Outlet, Port Glasgow | | No | |
| Oswego Falls and Sodus Bay Turnpike | | March 14, 1817, c. 84 | 29 miles (47 km) | Fulton, Port Glasgow | | Yes | |
| Homer and Elbridge Turnpike | | March 28, 1817, c. 121 | | Homer, Scott, Spafford, Skaneateles, Elbridge | | No | |
| Oswego and Sodus Branch Turnpike | | March 28, 1817, c. 122 | | Auburn, Sterling, Oswego, Cato, Wolcott | | No | |
| Fishkill Mountain Turnpike | | March 31, 1817, c. 142 | | Patterson, Fishkill | | Yes | 1820: Authorized to begin collecting tolls |
| Westchester and Pelham Turnpike | | April 5, 1817, c. 157 | 2 miles (3.2 km) | Schuylerville, Pelham Bridge | Hutchison River Parkway East, Libby Place, Buhre Avenue, Westchester Avenue, Shore Road | Yes | |
| Albany and Schoharie Turnpike | | April 5, 1817, c. 168 | | Schoharie, Berne, Bethlehem, Albany | | Yes | |
| South Oyster Bay Turnpike | | April 7, 1817, c. 188 | | Hempstead, Babylon | Greenwich Street, Nassau Road, Babylon Turnpike, Merrick Road, NY 27A | Yes | 1837: Authorized to alter their route near Fort Neck. Not to be confused with another company with the same name inc. 1850 |
| Huntington and Smithtown Turnpike | | April 15, 1817, c. 293 | 14 miles (23 km) | Smithtown, Oyster Bay | NY 25 | Yes | |
| Pawlings and Beekman Turnpike | | April 3, 1818, c. 86 | 8 miles (13 km) | Pawlings, Beekman | NY 55 | Yes | In business up to 1906 |
| Westmoreland and Sodus Bay Turnpike | | April 10, 1818, c. 98 | | Hampton, Bridgeport, Lysander, Cato | | No | Only the bridge across the Seneca River on modern NY 31 was constructed. Further reading: |
| Buffalo and Manchester Turnpike | | April 10, 1818, c. 99 | | Buffalo, Black Rock, Manchester | | No | |
| Florida and White Oak Island Turnpike | | April 10, 1818, c. 102 | | Florida, Warwick | | No | |
| DeRuyter and Cazenovia Turnpike | | April 10, 1818, c. 112 | | Cazenovia, DeRuyter, German | | No | |
| Hamilton and Columbus Turnpike | | April 10, 1818, c. 113 | | Morrisville, Hamilton, Griffin's Mills, Columbus | | No | |
| German and Cincinnatus Turnpike | | April 10, 1818, c. 114 | 3 miles (4.8 km) | Cincinnatus, German | Cincinnatus Road, NY 26 | Yes | Listed as the endpoint for the Geneganslet Turnpike |
| Cazenovia and Chittenango Turnpike | | April 10, 1818, c. 117 | | Cazenovia, Chittenango | | No | Not to be confused with a same named company chartered 1848 |
| Blenheim and Jefferson Turnpike | | April 10, 1818, c. 118 | | Blenheim, Jefferson | | No | |
| Benton and Wayne Turnpike | | April 17, 1818, c. 178 | | Penn Yan, Hammondsport | | No | |
| Saugerties Branch Turnpike | | April 17, 1818, c. 189 | | Saugerties, Plattekill | | No | |
| Otsego Lake Turnpike | | April 17, 1818, c. 190 | 11 miles (18 km) | Cooperstown, Pierstown, Springfield | NY 80 (Pierstown Road) | Yes | |
| Oxford Turnpike | | April 20, 1818, c. 200 | | Oxford, Bainbridge | | No | Was to be built on the old Chenango Turnpike |
| Dunkirk and Moscow Turnpike | | April 20, 1818, c. 201 | | Dunkirk, Perry, Moscow | | No | |
| Stamford and Middletown Turnpike | | April 21, 1818, c. 242 | | Delhi, Stamford, Roxbury | | No | |
| Otego Turnpike | | April 21, 1818, c. 246 | | New Berlin, West End, Charlotte River | | Possibly | Inherited southern portion of road from Charlotte River Turnpike |
| Gardner's Island Turnpike | | April 21, 1818, c. 247 | | Pine Island, Gardner's Island, New Jersey state line | | No | |
| Warsaw and Lake Erie Turnpike | | April 21, 1818, c. 263 | | Leicester, Perry, Orangeville, Sheldon, Willink, Hamburgh, Lake Erie | | No | |
| Brookfield and Sherburne Turnpike | | March 12, 1819, c. 45 | | Brookfield, Sherburne | | No | |
| Turin and Leyden Turnpike | | March 26, 1819, c. 73 | 13 miles (21 km) | Boonville, Turin | West Road | Yes | End point for first Canal TP. Line later used for West Turin and Leyden Plank Road |
| Plattekill Turnpike | | April 2, 1819, c. 92 | | West Saugerties, Hunter | | No | |
| Clove Turnpike | | April 2, 1819, c. 94 | | Vail's Gate, New Windsor & Cornwall TP | | No | |
| Little Falls and Oldenbarneveld Turnpike | | April 2, 1819, c. 99 | | Little Falls, Herkimer, Fairfield, Newport, Russia, Oldenbarneveld | | No | |
| Corinth and Tully Turnpike | | April 9, 1819, c. 121 | | Corinth, Tully | | No | |
| McDonough Turnpike | | April 9, 1819, c. 130 | | Oxford, McDonough, Cincinnatus | | No | |
| Rome and Sackett's Harbor Turnpike | | April 9, 1819, c. 137 | | Whitestown, Rome, Adams, Sackett's Harbor | | No | |
| Franklin Turnpike | | April 9, 1819, c. 144 | | Manlius, Franklin, Truxton | | No | |
| Delhi and Franklin Turnpike | | April 9, 1819, c. 145 | | Bartlett Hollow, Delhi | | No | |
| Oxford and Butternuts Turnpike | | April 12, 1819, c. 159 | | Oxford, Guilford, Butternuts, McDonald's Bridge | | Yes | |
| Rome Turnpike | | April 12, 1819, c. 172 | 2.16 miles (3.48 km) | Rome, road to Oneida | James Street | Yes | |
| Geneganslet Turnpike | | April 12, 1819, c. 173 | | Chenango Point, Chenango Forks, Genegantslet, Smithville Flats, Cincinnatus | | No | |
| Niagara, Cattaraugus and Chautauque Turnpike | | April 12, 1819, c. 183 | | Buffalo, Smithville, Eden, Concord, Fredonia | | No | |
| Cortland and Owego Turnpike | | April 13, 1819, c. 194 | | Cortland, Virgil, Richford, Owego | | No | |
| Fort George Turnpike | | April 13, 1819, c. 245 | | Glen Falls, Lake George | | No | |
| Wawarsing and Traps Turnpike | | April 7, 1820, c. 151 | | Rochester, Wawarsing | | No | |
| Hampton and Whitehall Turnpike | | April 11, 1820, c. 177 | | Hampton, Whitehall | Old NY 273 | Probably | |
| Kent and Carmel Turnpike | | March 23, 1821, c. 133 | | Kent, Carmel | | No | |
| Petersburgh Turnpike | | February 28, 1822, c. 49 | | Troy, Milltown, Brunswick, Grafton, Petersburgh, Massachusetts state line | | No | |
| Sandford Turnpike | | March 22, 1822, c. 82 | | Deposit, Sanford, Pennsylvania state line | | No | |
| Bainbridge and Deposit Turnpike | | March 29, 1822, c. 142 | | Deposit, Bainbridge | | No | |
| Charlotte Turnpike | | April 12, 1822, c. 191 | | McDonald's Bridge, Harpersfield | | No | Not to be confused with a later Charlotte Turnpike |
| Hunter Turnpike | | April 12, 1822, c. 208 | | Hunter, Saugerties | | Yes | |
| Canal Turnpike | | February 28, 1823, c. 50 | | Lee, Turin | NY 26, North Main Street | Yes | 1826: Extended south to Rome and north to the Turin-Leyden TP at Constableville. Not to be confused with a later Canal Turnpike, chartered 1827 |
| Catskill Mountain Association's Turnpike | | March 24, 1823, c. 84 | | Catskill, Hunter | | No | |
| Long Causeway Turnpike | | April 7, 1823, c. 113 | 4 miles (6.4 km) | Lockport, Newfane | NY 104 | Yes | |
| Spring Turnpike | | April 10, 1823, c. 131 | | Mechanicville, Malta | | No | |
| Goshen and Monroe Turnpike | | April 12, 1823, c. 155 | 4 miles (6.4 km) | Goshen, Chester | | Yes | |
| Hector and Catharine Turnpike | | April 15, 1823, c. 161 | | Jefferson, Catharine, Hector | | Yes | 1833: Route changed to travel along Washington Street in Jefferson |
| Ulster and Delaware Western Turnpike | | April 19, 1823, c. 194 | | Esopus Creek, Middletown | | No | |
| Sand Lake and Nassau Turnpike | | April 23, 1823, c. 226 | | Sand Lake, Nassau, New Lebanon | | Yes | 1836: Authorized to extend to Lebanon Springs |
| Monroe and Haverstraw Turnpike | | March 10, 1824, c. 79 | 13 miles (21 km) | Monroe, Haverstraw | Orange CR 106, Main Street | Yes | Formed the western part of the border of Haverstraw and Stony Point |
| Batavia and Newport Turnpike | | March 27, 1824, c. 124 | | Elba, Barre | | No | |
| Oxford and Windsor Turnpike | | April 3, 1824, c. 165 | | Oxford, Coventry, Bainbridge, Windsor, Pennsylvania state line | | No | |
| Harpersfield, Jefferson and Blenheim Turnpike | | April 6, 1824, c. 169 | | Sturges Corner, Blenheim | | No | |
| Buffalo Turnpike | | April 10, 1824, c. 212 | | Buffalo Creek, Lake Erie | | No | |
| Nassau Turnpike | | April 10, 1824, c. 214 | | Nassau, Sand Lake | | Yes | 1827: authorized to extend to Blooming Grove. Charter repealed 1851 |
| Onondaga and Cortland Turnpike | | April 10, 1824, c. 219 | | Syracuse, Truxton, Cincinnatus | | No | |
| Whitehall and Fairhaven Turnpike | | April 10, 1824, c. 221 | 7 miles (11 km) | Whitehall, Vermont state line | Washington CR 9, US 4 | Yes | |
| Port Kent and Malone Turnpike | | March 29, 1825, c. 55 | | Port Kent, Keeseville, Malone | | No | |
| Auburn and Port Byron Turnpike | | April 13, 1825, c. 140 | | Auburn, Brutus, Port Byron, Mosquito Point | | No | |
| Saugerties and Woodstock Turnpike | | April 14, 1825, c. 156 | | Saugerties, Woodstock | | No | Not to be confused with earlier and later Saugerties-Woodstock Turnpikes |
| Hemlock Lake Turnpike | | April 15, 1825, c. 162 | | Canadice Lake, Hemlock Lake, Richmond south line | | Possibly | Route clarified 1838 |
| Rochester Portage Turnpike | | April 20, 1825, c. 229 | | Gates, Handford's Landing | | No | |
| Broome and Tioga Turnpike | | April 20, 1825, c. 259 | | Pennsylvania state line at Kirkwood, Binghamton, Union, Newark, Caroline, Catskill Turnpike | | No | |
| Bristol Turnpike | | April 21, 1825, c. 280 | 9 miles (14 km) | Bristol, Catskill | River Road, Main Street, Malden Turnpike, NY 32, NY 32A | Yes | Renamed to the Malden Turnpike 1830, c. 275 |
| Rome and Rochester Turnpike | | April 21, 1825, c. 295 | 80 miles (130 km) | Rome, Vienna, Constantia, Oswego Falls, Hannibal, Sterling, Wolcott | Dominick Street, Rome-New London Road, Oswego Road, NY 49, NY 3 | Yes | |
| Buffalo and Hamburg Turnpike | | April 13, 1826, c. 170 | | Buffalo, Hamburg | | No | Not to be confused with a later corporation formed 1830 |
| Flushing and Huntington Northern Turnpike | | April 13, 1826, c. 171 | | Flushing, Little Neck, Great Neck, Cow Neck, Hempstead Harbor, Cedar Swamp, Wolver Hollow, Norwich, Cold Spring, Huntington, (Smithtown) | | No | |
| Long Pond Turnpike | | April 14, 1826, c. 192 | | New Jersey state line at Hewitt–Warwick, Greenwood Lake | | No | |
| Greenbush and Troy Turnpike | | April 14, 1826, c. 193 | | Greenbush, Troy | | No | |
| Bath and Sparta Turnpike | | April 17, 1826, c. 266 | | Bath, Dansville | | No | 1827, c. 194: east end relocated to Kennedy's corners |
| Lockport Turnpike | | April 17, 1826, c. 270 | | Lockport, Cambria, Wilson, Porter, Youngstown | | No | |
| Cherry Valley and Canajoharie Turnpike | | April 17, 1826, c. 272 | | North of Cherry Valley, outside Canajoharie | | No | |
| Catskill and Mountain Turnpike | | April 6, 1827, c. 171 | 13 miles (21 km) | Catskill village, Catskill town | Bridge Street, US 9W, NY 23A, Mountain Turnpike Road | Yes | Part in Catskill village abandoned 1877 |
| Eastern Branch Turnpike | | April 7, 1827, c. 191 | | Averill Park, Berlin | | No | |
| Putnam and Dutchess Turnpike | | April 11, 1827, c. 206 | | Somers-North Salem-Carmel-Southeast corners, Pawlings | | No | |
| Johnstown and Amsterdam Turnpike | | April 14, 1827, c. 243 | 15 miles (24 km) | Johnstown, Oppenheim | NY 67, New Turnpike Road | Yes | From parts of Johnstown Turnpike |
| Stephentown and Nassau Turnpike | | April 14, 1827, c. 256 | | Stephentown, Nassau | | No | |
| Canal Turnpike (Wayne County) | | April 14, 1827, c. 276 | | Lyons, Clyde, Savannah | | No | |
| Wallabocht and Bedford Turnpike | | April 16, 1827, c. 314 | | Brooklyn, Bedford | | No | |
| Tully and Syracuse Turnpike | | April 16, 1827, c. 316 | | Syracuse, Tully | | No | Not to be confused with a later Tully and Syracuse TP chartered 1831 |
| Otisville Turnpike | | February 19, 1828, c. 32 | | Calhoun, Mamakating | | No | |
| Lansingburgh Turnpike | | March 28, 1828, c. 135 | At least 2 miles (3.2 km) | Lansingburgh, Schagticoke | New Turnpike Road, River Road, New Schagticoke Road ... | Yes | 1830: Authorized to extend north to the Hoosick River and south to Union Bridge |
| Watervliet Turnpike | | March 31, 1828, c. 141 | 4 miles (6.4 km) | Albany-Watervliet line, West Troy | Broadway, NY 32 | Yes | |
| Spencer and Danby Turnpike | | March 31, 1828, c. 145 | | Spencer, Danby | | No | |
| Farmer's Turnpike (Suffolk County) | | April 4, 1828, c. 153 | | ?, Huntington and Smithtown Turnpike | | No | |
| Hudson River and Hudson and Delaware Canal Turnpike | | April 15, 1828, c. 214 | | Esopus, New Paltz, Marbletown | | No | |
| Fort Plain and Canadaraga Turnpike | | April 15, 1828, c. 215 | | Fort Plain, Danube, Warren, Canadarango Springs | | No | |
| Dover and Union Vale Turnpike | | April 19, 1828, c. 266 | | Connecticut state line at Bull's Bridge, Union Vale | | No | Not to be confused with a similarly named company chartered 1835 |
| Kingston and Middletown Turnpike | | April 19, 1828, c. 283 | | Kingston, Shandaken, Middletown (West Branch Delaware River) | | No | Not to be confused with a similarly named company chartered 1831 |
| Painted Post Turnpike | | April 21, 1828, c. 322 | | Painted Post, Erwin line | | No | |
| Greene and Delaware Turnpike | | April 21, 1828, c. 325 | | Middletown, Hunter | NY 28, NY 42, NY 23A | Yes | |
| Franklin and St. Lawrence Turnpike | | April 21, 1828, c. 330 | | Moira-Brasher line, Brasher-Stockholm line | | No | |
| Chateaugay Turnpike | | April 21, 1828, c. 338 | | Malone, Brainardsville, Mooers | | Yes | |
| Saugerties and Woodstock Turnpike | | April 21, 1828, c. 311 | | Saugerties, Woodstock, (Shandaken) | | Yes | Made public beyond Woodstock 1851. |
| Canajoharie and Sharon Turnpike | | February 9, 1829, c. 26 | | Canajoharie, Sharon | | No | |
| Ithaca and Havana Turnpike | | March 28, 1829, c. 86 | | Ithaca, Havana | | No | |
| Flushing and Huntington Turnpike | | April 14, 1829, c. 133 | | Flushing, Hempstead Harbor, Huntington | | No | |
| Rome and New London Turnpike | | April 17, 1829, c. 155 | | Verona, New London, Rome | | No | Reincorporated with much of the same membership 1830 |
| Saratoga County Turnpike | | April 18, 1829, c. 172 | | Waterford, Halfmoon, Clifton, Ballston Spa, Saratoga Springs | | Maybe | Referenced here |
| Rome and Vienna Turnpike | | April 23, 1829, c. 241 | | Rome | | No | |
| Bethpage Turnpike | | April 23, 1829, c. 233 | 8 miles (13 km) | Hempstead, Bethpage, (Babylon) | NY 24 | Yes | |
| Deep Hollow Branch Turnpike | | April 27, 1829, c. 286 | | Washington, Amenia | | Yes | |
| Cooperstown, Schoharie and Durham Turnpike | | April 30, 1829, c. 331 | | Cooperstown, Fulton, Durham | | No | Still in business by 1834 |
| East Kill Turnpike | | May 1, 1829, c. 338 | | Lexington, Hunter, Windham | | No | |
| Buffalo and Hamburg Turnpike | | January 8, 1830, c. 11 | Over 7 miles (11 km) | Hamburgh, Buffalo | Hoover Road, NY 5, Ohio Street | Yes | Subject of an 1874 court case |
| Charlotte Turnpike | | April 16, 1830, c. 199 | 20 miles (32 km) | Harpersfield, North Kortright, Davenport, Davenport Center, West Davenport, Milfordville, Otego, Gilbertsville | NY 23, Pine Lake Road, Charlotte Creek Road, NY 7 | Yes | 1833: western terminus moved from Gilbertsville to Oneonta |
| Rome and New London Turnpike | | April 16, 1830, c. 200 | | Verona, Rome | | | |
| Ellenville and Shawangunk Turnpike | | April 17, 1830, c. 229 | | Ellenville, Sam's Point | | No | |
| Woodbourne and Ellenville Turnpike | | April 17, 1830, c. 227 | | Ellenville, Woodbourne | NY 52 | Yes | |
| Delhi and Meredith Turnpike | | April 20, 1830, c. 271 | | Delhi, West Meredith | | No | |
| Kingston and Middletown Turnpike | | February 17, 1831, c. 45 | 30 miles (48 km) | Kingston, Pine Hill | Washington Avenue, NY 28, NY 28A ... NY 28 | Yes | Start point for the Prattsville TP. Subject of The People v. The Kingston and Middletown Turnpike Company, May 1840. Sold their road to a similarly named plank road 1850 |
| New Paltz Turnpike | | April 9, 1831, c. 108 | 9 miles (14 km) | Highland, New Paltz | River Road, Vineyard Avenue, Old NY 299, NY 299 | Yes | |
| Brunswick and Pittstown Turnpike | | April 18, 1831, c. 180 | 12 miles (19 km) | Milltown, Pittstown | NY 2, Tamarac Road | Yes | 1834: Authorized to extend north to the Troy railroad |
| Brunswick and Pittstown Turnpike | | April 18, 1831, c. 180 | 12 miles (19 km) | Milltown, Pittstown | NY 2, Tamarac Road | Yes | 1834: Authorized to extend north to the Troy railroad |
| Troy Turnpike | | April 18, 1831, c. 182 | | Troy, Vermont state line | NY 7 | Yes | Still in business by 1839 |
| Liberty and Bethel Branch Turnpike | | April 21, 1831, c. 198 | | Liberty-Neversink line, Cochecton | | No | |
| Oneonta and Franklin Turnpike | | April 22, 1831, c. 235 | | Milfordville, Franklin | | No | Not to be confused with a later turnpike of the same name chartered 1835 |
| Syracuse and Pulaski Turnpike | | April 23, 1831, c. 258 | | Syracuse, Salina, Cicero, Brewerton, Central Square, Colose, Maple View, Pulaski | | No | |
| West Point and Cornwall Turnpike | | April 20, 1831, c. 202 | | West Point, Cornwall Landing | | No | |
| Tully and Syracuse Turnpike | | April 25, 1831, c. 285 | 20 miles (32 km) | Tully, Syracuse | US 11, North Road | Yes | |
| Ticonderoga and Schroon Turnpike | | April 26, 1832, c. 304 | | Ticonderoga, Schroon | | No | |
| Schenectady and Duanesburgh Turnpike | | April 26, 1832, c. 305 | | Duanesburgh-Princeton line, Schenectady | | No | |
| Saratoga Turnpike | | April 26, 1832, c. 320 | 22 miles (35 km) | West Troy, Clifton Park, Jonesville, Ballston Spa | NY 32, Mohawk Street, Crescent Road, US 9 Plank Road, Saratoga CR 94, Old Route 146, Old Plank Road, Plank Road, Saratoga CR 109, Carlton Road, Main Street, Longkill Road, Eastline Road, NY 67 | Yes | |
| Berlin and Poestenkill Turnpike | | March 15, 1833, c. 65 | | Berlin, Poestenkill | Plank Road | Yes | 1836: Authorized to extend west. Charter repealed 1852. |
| Blenheim, Jefferson and Harpersfield Turnpike | | April 3, 1833, c. 126 | 17 miles (27 km) | North Blenheim, Charlotte Turnpike | Schoharie CR 2, CR 2A, Delaware CR 29 | Yes | End point of the Gilboa and Jefferson Turnpike. On the track of the road surveyed by the Albany and Delaware TP co. |
| East Salem Turnpike | | April 19, 1833, c. 177 | | Jackson, Vermont state line | | No | |
| Salina and Oswego Turnpike | | April 24, 1833, c. 210 | | Salina, Liverpool, Phoenix, Fulton, Oswego | | No | |
| Sag Harbor and Bull’s Head Turnpike | | April 29, 1833, c. 282 | 4 miles (6.4 km) | Sag Harbor, Bull's Head | CR 79 | Yes | Collection of tolls began 1837. In business at least to 1893 |
| Troy and Schenectady McAdam Turnpike | | April 30, 1833, c. 305 | | Troy, Schenectady | | Maybe | First company chartered to make a MacAdam road in New York. Was to be purchased from the Troy-Schenectady TP Co. |
| Moirah Turnpike | | April 30, 1833, c. 308 | 10 miles (16 km) | West Moirah, Cedar Point | | No | |
| Chemung Turnpike | | March 25, 1834, c. 50 | | Lower Narrows, Upper Narrows | | No | Not to be confused with another local road known by this name |
| Utica and New Berlin McAdam Turnpike | | March 26, 1834, c. 51 | | Utica, New Hartford, Bridgewater, New Berlin | | No | |
| Rensselaer and Berkshire Turnpike | | March 29, 1834, c. 57 | | Berlin, Massachusetts state line | | No | |
| Butternuts and Oxford Turnpike | | April 16, 1834, c. 112 | | Oxford, Mount Upton, Gilbertsville, Otego | New Virginia Road, Chenango CR 37, NY 51 ... | Yes | Subject of a court case in 1841. Authorized to abandon their road 20 miles beyond Oxford 1851 |
| New Paltz and Liberty Turnpike | | April 22, 1834, c. 142 | | New Paltz, Ellenville, Liberty | | No | |
| East Creek Turnpike | | April 24, 1834, c. 167 | | Manheim (along East Canada Creek) | | No | 1835: Authorized to extend north to Salisbury Center |
| Plattekill Turnpike | | April 28, 1834, c. 194 | | Saugerties-Woodstock TP, Plattekill Clove, (Lexington, Prattsville) | | Probably not | |
| Binghamton and Harpursville Turnpike | | May 2, 1834, c. 251 | | Binghamton, Conklin, Harpersville | | No | |
| Oneida and Jefferson Turnpike | | May 3, 1834, c. 268 | | Rome, Lee, Annsville, Florence, Redfield, Boylstown, Lorraine, Adams, Sackets Harbor | | No | Construction may have begun, but if so it's unlikely it was completed beyond Lorraine |
| Gowanus, Fort Hamilton and Bath Turnpike | | May 6, 1834, c. 317 | | Brooklyn, Fort Hamilton, Bath | | No | |
| Oneonta and Franklin Turnpike | | April 13, 1835, c. 69 | | Davenport, Franklin | NY 28, NY 357 | Yes | Abandoned a mile from McDonald's bridge 1845. Still in business to 1916 |
| Oxford and Cortlandville Turnpike | | April 13, 1835, c. 86 | | Oxford, McDonough, German, Cincinnatus, Solon, Cortland | | No | |
| Petersburgh, Grafton and Brunswick Turnpike | | April 20, 1835, c. 107 | | Petersburgh, Grafton, Brunswick | NY 2 | Yes | 1840: Authorized to extend their road east to the Massachusetts state line |
| Kingston Turnpike | | April 23, 1835, c. 130 | | Kingston | | No | |
| Bath and Coney Island Turnpike | | April 23, 1835, c. 137 | | Brooklyn, across from Coney Island | | No | |
| Dover and Union Vale Turnpike | | April 23, 1835, c. 145 | | Dover, Union Vale | | Yes | 1836: Authorized to extend through Union Vale. Charter repealed 1851 |
| Bainbridge and Oxford Turnpike | | May 2, 1835, c. 191 | | Bainbridge, Chenango canal in Oxford | | No | |
| North Hempstead and Flushing Turnpike | | May 4, 1835, c. 218 | | Cow Neck, Little Neck | NY 25A | Yes | 1836: Authorized to extend east to Norwich, then Cold Spring Harbor |
| LeRoy and Brockport McAdam Turnpike | | May 4, 1835, c. 217 | | LeRoy, Brockport | | No | |
| Gilboa and Jefferson Turnpike | | May 4, 1835, c. 216 | | Gilboa, Blenheim, Jefferson | | No | Not to be confused with a later turnpike of the same name |
| Clarkson and Sweden McAdam Turnpike | | May 11, 1835, c. 295 | | Brockport, Lake Ontario | | No | |
| Lumberland and Bethel Turnpike | | May 11, 1835, c. 286 | | Lumberland, Bethel | | No | |
| Butternuts and Sherburne Turnpike | | April 9, 1836, c. 116 | | Sherburne, New Berlin, Louisville, Oneonta | | Yes | Made public 1877 |
| Westfield and Nettle Hill Turnpike | | April 11, 1836, c. 125 | | Westfield, Nettle Hill | | No | |
| New Rochelle and Harlaem Turnpike | | April 20, 1836, c. 167 | | New Rochelle, Eastchester, Harlem River | | | |
| Bushwick and Newtown Bridge Turnpike | Main Road | April 26, 1836, c. 192 | | Williamsburgh, Newtown | 45th Avenue, Laurel Hill Boulevard, Meeker Avenue | Yes | |
| Bushwick and Newtown Bridge Turnpike | Branch | April 26, 1836, c. 192 | | , Newtown and Bushwick TP | | | |
| Bushwick and Newtown Bridge Turnpike | Branch | April 4, 1853, c. 93 | | , Maspeth and Newtown PR | | | |
| Buffalo and Williamsville McAdam Turnpike | | May 3, 1836, c. 240 | | Buffalo, 11 Mile Creek, Clarence Hollow | NY 5 | Yes | |
| Norwich and Mt. Upton Turnpike | | May 13, 1836, c. 331 | | Norwich, Mount Upton | | No | |
| Norwich and New Berlin Turnpike | | May 13, 1836, c. 334 | | Norwich, New Berlin | | No | |
| Ninevah and Oxford Turnpike | | May 18, 1836, c. 369 | | Nineveh, Oxford | | No | |
| Unadilla and Deposit Turnpike | | May 18, 1836, c. 370 | | Unadilla, Masonville, Deposit | | No | |
| Port Byron and Conquest Turnpike | | May 25, 1836, c. 469 | | Port Byron, Mosquito Point | NY 38 | Yes | Still in business by 1851 |
| Deerfield McAdam Turnpike | | May 25, 1836, c. 473 | | Deerfield, Deerfield Corners | | No | Not to be confused with a later Deerfield McAdam TP |
| Norwich and Ithaca Turnpike | | May 25, 1836, c. 479 | | Norwich, Cincinnatus, Cortland, Virgil, Dryden, Ithaca | | No | |
| Florida and Duanesburgh Turnpike | | May 25, 1836, c. 503 | | Minaville, Duanesburgh, Mariaville, Princetown, Rotterdam, Schenectady | | No | 1837: Authorized to extend west to Tribe's Hill |
| White Creek Turnpike | | May 25, 1836, c. 359 | | Eagle Bridge, Vermont state line | | No | |
| Rondout and Beaverkill Turnpike | | May 26, 1836, c. 522 | | (Port Hexon), Port Benjamin (Wawarsing), Rondout Creek, Willowemoc Creek, Beaver Kill, East Branch Delaware River, (Hancock) | | Yes | A direct continuation of the First Great South Western TP. Unclear as to whether the company survived after incorporation |
| Fort Plain and Otsego McAdam Turnpike | | April 4, 1837, c. 260 | | Fort Plain, Springfield | | No | |
| Lenox Basin and Chenango Canal Turnpike | | April 24, 1837, c. 244 | | Lenox Basin, Wampsville, Lenox Mills, Siloam, Chenango Canal | | No | |
| Neatmoose Turnpike | | April 28, 1837, c. 275 | | Eagle Bridge, Pittstown | | No | |
| Clinton and Utica McAdam Turnpike | | May 5, 1837, c. 332 | | Clinton, Utica | | No | |
| Canajoharie and Sharon Turnpike | | May 9, 1837, c. 366 | | Canajoharie, Sharon Springs | | No | |
| Rosendale Turnpike | | May 9, 1837, c. 366 | | Hurley, New Paltz Turnpike | | No | |
| Salisbury and Little Falls McAdam Turnpike | | May 10, 1837, c. 381 | | Salisbury, Little Falls | | No | |
| Steele Creek Turnpike | | May 16, 1837, c. 477 | | German Flatts, Cedarville, Winfield | | No | |
| Fallsburgh Turnpike | | March 29, 1838, c. 134 | 12 miles (19 km) | Ellenville, Fallsburgh | NY 52 | Yes | 1852: sold to the Ellenville and Fallsburgh Plank Road Co. |
| Fort Ann and West Granville Turnpike | | April 6, 1838, c. 165 | | Fort Ann, Granville | | No | |
| Smithville and Willett Turnpike | | April 12, 1838, c. 198 | | Smithville Flatts, Willet | | No | |
| Napanock Turnpike | | April 14, 1838, c. 219 | | Old Paltz, Napanock | | No | |
| Falls Branch Turnpike | | April 14, 1838, c. 214 | | Neversink Creek, NY 52 | | No | |
| Catskill and Ulster Turnpike | | April 14, 1838, c. 217 | 12 miles (19 km) | Catskill, West Camp, Ulster | | No | |
| Ravenswood, Hallett's Cove, and Williamsburgh Turnpike | | April 18, 1838, c. 272 | | Hallett's Cove, Bushwick | Vernon Boulevard | Yes | 1860: authorized to lay a tram on their road |
| South Durham Turnpike | | March 27, 1839, c. 102 | | Durham | | No | |
| Masonville Turnpike | | April 4, 1839, c. 125 | | Unadilla, Masonville, Deposit | | No | Had attempted the previous year, but was vetoed due to not having described their route |
| West Troy and Cohoes Turnpike | | April 20, 1839, c. 202 | | West Troy, Cohoes | | No | |
| Deerfield McAdam Turnpike | | April 20, 1839, c. 244 | | Utica, Deerfield Corners | | Yes | Not to be confused with an earlier Deerfield McAdam TP. Listed as the endpoint of the Northern Plank Road |
| Summit and Fulton Turnpike | | May 4, 1839, c. 339 | 10 miles (16 km) | Summit Corners, Byneville, Fulton | | No | |
| Unadilla and Butternuts Turnpike | | April 10, 1840, c. 101 | | Gilbertsville, Unadilla | | No | |
| Delhi and Meredith Turnpike | | April 13, 1840, c. 126 | | Delhi, West Meredith | | No | |
| Astoria and Flushing Turnpike | | May 11, 1840, c. 265 | | Lawrence's Point, Hallett's Cove | Astoria Boulevard | Yes | Was still known by that name as late as 1909, though more commonly known as Flushing Avenue before the 1920s |
| Middletown and Delhi Turnpike | | May 14, 1840, c. 334 | | Pine Hill, Middletown, Andes, Bovina, Delhi | NY 28 | Yes | Later amendments suggest that the road may have run through Meredith, though the same amendments also listed the endpoint as Delhi |
| Meredith Turnpike | | May 14, 1840, c. 335 | | Delhi, Meredith, Davenport | | No | |
| Schagticoke and Lansingburgh Turnpike | | March 19, 1841, c. 187 | | Schagticoke, Lansingburgh | NY 40, Melrose Valley Falls Road | Yes | |
| Addison Turnpike | | May 10, 1841, c. 178 | | Addison, Pennsylvania state line | NY 417, Steuben CR 85 | Yes | Discontinued 1877 |
| Hurley and Woodstock Turnpike | | May 12, 1841, c. 187 | | Hurley, Woodstock | | | |
| Lumberland and Bethel Turnpike | | May 26, 1841, c. 279 | | D&H Canal, Bethel | | No | |
| Deerpark and Minisink Turnpike | | May 26, 1841, c. 286 | | Deerpark, Minisink | | No | |
| Olive and New Paltz Turnpike | | May 26, 1841, c. 293 | | New Paltz Landing, Arnoldville, Rosendale, Marbletown, Olive, Caseville | | No | |
| Gilboa and Jefferson Turnpike | | March 28, 1842, c. 95 | | Gilboa, Jefferson | NY 30 ... Schoharie CR 13, NY 10 | Yes | Not to be confused with an earlier, similarly named company |
| Gilboa and Patterson's Hollow Turnpike | | April 8, 1842, c. 131 | | Gilboa, Broome, Rensselaerville | Schoharie CR 17, CR 61, Albany CR 362 | Yes | Was to terminate at a railroad that was never constructed; actually terminated at Potter's Hollow. Known by that name at least to 1877, though more commonly known as the Gilboa and Potter's Hollow Turnpike |
| Hamburgh Turnpike | | April 17, 1843, c. 149 | | Hamburgh | NY 5 | Yes | |
| Otisville and Westbrookville Turnpike | | April 17, 1843, c. 148 | | Otisville, Westbrookville | | No | |
| Prattsville Turnpike | | April 17, 1843, c. 152 | | Shandaken, Bushnellville, Lexington, Prattsville | NY 42, NY 23A | Yes | Abandoned 1856 |
| Cayuga and Seneca Road and Bridge | | April 18, 1843, c. 158 | | Mentz, Tyre | | No | |
| Roxbury Turnpike | | March 29, 1844, c. | | Windham Turnpike, Delaware River, Roxbury | | No | |
| East Hampton Turnpike | | April 23, 1844, c. 190 | | East Hampton, Sag Harbor | NY 114 | Yes | |
| Lexington Turnpike | | May 1, 1844, c. 246 | | Windham Turnpike, Hunter, Lexington, Prattsville Turnpike | | No | |
| Lackawach and Neverskink Turnpike | | May 7, 1844, c. 289 | | Napanoch, Parksville | NY 55 ... Bradley Road, Tanzman Road | Probably | |
| Rome and Oswego Road | | May 7, 1844, c. 293 | | Rome, Oswego | | Yes | 1854: Not to be confused with a similarly named plank road |
| Black Rock and Niagara Road | | May 7, 1844, c. 294 | | Black Rock, Tonowanda, Niagara Falls | | No | |
| Delaware Turnpike | | April 8, 1845, c. 47 | | Blenheim, West Harpersfield | NY 23 | Probably | Toll houses were still in operation on the road 1856 |
| Unadilla and Norwich Turnpike | | April 19, 1845, c. 81 | | Unadilla, Rochdale, Norwich | | No | |
| Rosendale and New Paltz Turnpike | | April 25, 1845, c. 95 | | New Paltz, Rosendale | | No | |
| Fallsburgh and Liberty Turnpike | | May 10, 1845, c. 173 | | Woodbourne, Liberty | NY 52 | Yes | |
| Greenville and Potter's Hollow Turnpike | | May 13, 1845, c. 241 | | Greenville, Durham, Potter's Hollow | | No | |
| Prattsville and Gilboa Turnpike | | May 13, 1845, c. 223 | | Prattsville, Conesville, Gilboa | | No | |
| Port Byron and Savannah Turnpike | | May 14, 1845, c. 318 | | Port Byron, Howland Island, Savannah | | No | |
| Binghamton and Pennsylvania Turnpike | | 1848 | | | | Yes | Referenced in law 1851 |
| East Hamburg Turnpike | | Before 1853 | | East Hamburg | | Yes | |
| Callicoon and Cochecton Turnpike | | 1852 | | Cochecton, Pike Pond, Jeffersonville, Youngsville | New Turnpike Road, NY 52 | Yes | Extended to near the Delaware River the year of incorporation |
| Cazenovia and Chittenango Turnpike | | April 11, 1853 | 8 miles (13 km) | Cazenovia, Chittenango | NY 13 | Yes | Reorganized from a plank road of a similar name |
| Jeffersonville and Monticello Turnpike | | Between 1856 and 1875 | | Jeffersonville, Monticello | Sullivan CR 142, CR 143, CR 142, CR 74, Old White Lake Turnpike, Lee Cole Road, Bushville-Swan Lake Road, Harris-Bushville Road, Old Route 17, Jefferson Street | Yes | |
| Verona and Vernon Turnpike | | April 12, 1863 | | | | | |
| Woodbourne and Liberty Turnpike | | May 2, 1863 | | | | | |
| Middletown and Bovina Turnpike | | February 2, 1865 | | | | | |
| Wappinger's Falls Turnpike and Navigation Co. | | April 22, 1867 | | Fishkill | | | |
| Platteville Clove Turnpike | | April 11, 1868 | | Saugerties, Hunter | | | |
| Herkimer and Middleville Stone Turnpike | | April 6, 1874 | | | | | |
| Kaaterskill Turnpike | | May 28, 1881 | | | | | |

== See also ==
- List of plank roads in New York
