= Babylon Turnpike =

Babylon Turnpike may refer to:

- Hempstead and Babylon Turnpike – Also known as "Hempstead–Babylon Turnpike" or simply "Babylon Turnpike"
- New York State Route 109 – Also known as "Babylon–Farmingdale Turnpike," "Maywood–Babylon Turnpike," or simply "Babylon Turnpike"
