= Oxford Turnpike =

Oxford Turnpike may refer to the following roads in the United States:

- Oxford Turnpike (Connecticut)
- Oxford Turnpike (New York), a turnpike in New York
