= The Cobble =

Mountain in New York, United States

- Location within New York Adirondack Park Location within the United States

Highest point
- Elevation: 2,329 feet (710 m)
- Coordinates: 42°35′19″N 74°33′42″W

Geography
- Location: NE of Summit, New York, U.S.
- Topo map: USGS Summit

The Cobble is a mountain in Schoharie County, New York. It is located northeast of Summit. Meade Hill is located southwest and Fulton Hill is located east-southeast of The Cobble.
