= Fulton Hill (Schoharie County, New York) =

Mountain in New York, United States

- Location within New York Adirondack Park Location within the United States

Highest point
- Elevation: 2,182 feet (665 m)
- Coordinates: 42°34′41″N 74°29′53″W

Geography
- Location: NW of West Fulton, New York, U.S.
- Topo map: USGS Breakabeen

Fulton Hill is a mountain in Schoharie County, New York. It is located northwest of West Fulton. The Cobble is located west-northwest and Rossman Hill is located southeast of Fulton Hill.
