= List of plank roads in New York =

Road list

This is a list of plank roads built and operated by private companies in the U.S. state of New York, mainly in the 19th century. While most of the roads are still maintained as free public roads, some have been abandoned.

== Background ==
The first plank road in the United States was the Syracuse-Central Square road. A 16.5 mile road built for $23,000 out of eight foot wide, four inch thick hemlock planks, the Syracuse-Central road was a massive success. In its first two years, 161,000 teams passing over it generated $12,900 in revenue. An 1847 report claimed that the road could generate 100 to 200 percent profit. Along the road, there were four toll booths. A vehicle that was drawn by two horses paid 1 and one-half cents per mile, one horse and rider paid half a cent, and pedestrians traveled on the road free.

After the success of the first plank road, applications to form new plank road companies poured in. By 1847, a general incorporation law was passed by the state legislature. The law made it significantly easier to form a company. The law stated that at least five people could come together and form a company with the intent to build a plank road, as long as they circulated a message in at least one newspaper in the county where the plank road would be built saying where people could buy a participating interest in the company. The company then had to raise at least 500 dollars per mile that the road would be built. Next, the proposed company had to draw up articles of association, elect directors according to the articles, name the company, state how long the company will continue (at most 30 years), list the company's capital, and provide in-depth information about where the road will go. The company could than petition the New York Department of State's office, and presumably get approval to form a company. In 1848, 52 companies were organized, 80 in 1849, and in the 1850s, about 200. This was significantly easier than the process before, which involved petitioning the New York State Legislature. In New York state, under the general incorporation law, from 1847 to 1854, more than 340 plank road building companies were incorporated, building about 3,500 miles of plank roads.

The New York Senate reported in 1870 that plank roads were more profitable than gravel or stone roads.

== List ==
Name		Chartered	Length	Routing	Approximate modern designation	Built?	Notes
Salina and Central Square Plank Road		April 12, 1844, c. 151		Salina - Central Square	US 11	Yes	See Background for more information
Lockport and Buffalo Plank Road		April 29, 1844, c. 227	10 miles (16 km)	Lockport - East Amherst	NY 78	Yes	Was planked once before it became unprofitable
Buffalo and Batavia Plank Road		May 7, 1844, c. 317		Batavia - Buffalo		Yes	
Ogdensburgh and Heuvelton Plank Road		May 9, 1846, c. 175	7 miles (11 km)	Ogdensburgh - Heuvelton		No	Was reincorporated 1848
Aurora and Buffalo Plank Road		May 11, 1846, c. 191		Aurora - Spring Brook - Buffalo	US 20A, NY 78, NY 16 (Seneca Street)	Yes	
Buffalo and Lancaster Plank Road		May 12, 1846, c. 212	15 miles (24 km)			No	Not to be confused with a later similarly named road
Henrietta Plank Road		May 12, 1846, c. 258	7 1/2 miles (12.1 km)	Brighton - Henrietta	NY 15	Yes	Likely only existed for a few years before the Rochester-West Henrietta PR was constructed
Rome and Oswego Plank Road		1847		Rome - Mexico - Oswego	West Dominick Street, NY 49, Oswego Road, Main Street, NY 13, NY 104	Yes	
Northern Plank Road		August 18, 1847	21 miles (34 km)			No	Not to be confused with another similarly named company chartered later that year
Cherry Valley and Canajoharie Plank Road		August 19, 1847	12 miles (19 km)			No	
Salmon River Plank Road		August 26, 1847	17 miles (27 km)	Port Ontario - Pulaski - Albion - Williamstown	Lake Road, US 11, NY 13	Yes	Authorized to sell the road west of Pulaski and abandon the road east of Sand Bank 1853
Watertown and Sackett's Harbor Plank Road		August 31, 1847	10 miles (16 km)	NY 3, Dodge Avenue	Watertown - Sackett's Harbor	Yes	
McConnellsville and Fish Creek Plank Road		September 9, 1847	4 miles (6.4 km)	Fish Creek Landing - McConnellsville		Yes	
Rome and Utica Plank Road		September 22, 1847	14 miles (23 km)	Rome - Oriskany - Whitesboro - Utica	Erie Boulevard ... Martin Street ... Stanwix Avenue, NY 69, Main Street, Whitesboro Street, Court Street	Yes	Partly abandoned 1856
Whites' Corners and Buffalo Plank Road		September 29, 1847	11 miles (18 km)	White's Corners - Buffalo	US 62, Southside Parkway, Abbot Road, South Park Avenue	Yes	Part abandoned 1881
Bridgewater and Utica Plank Road		October 20, 1847	18 miles (29 km)	Utica - Bridgewater	Oneida Street (Main Street), NY 8	Yes	Probable extension to New Berlin some time later
Lansingburgh Plank Road		October 20, 1847	2 miles (3.2 km)			No	Not to be confused with another similarly named road chartered the next year
Fonda and Caroga Plank Road		November 5, 1847		Fonda - Newkirk's Mills		Yes	Authorized to sell their road 1855
New London Plank Road		November 17, 1847	5 1/2 miles (8.9 km)	New London - Fish Creek - Rome and Oswego PR	NY 49, Herder Road	Yes	Abandoned north of Fish Creek 1853
Rome and Turin Plank Road		November 24, 1847	28 miles (45 km)	Rome - Lee - Ava - Turin		Yes	Abandoned 1855
Mohawk and Newport Plank Road		December 1, 1847	14 miles (23 km)	Mohawk - Herkimer - Middleville - Newport		Yes	Still in business to at least 1866. 1854: Authorized to abandon their road through Newport Village, and to make their bridges public
Waterville and Utica Plank Road		December 11, 1847	20 miles (32 km)	Utica - Clinton - Deansville - Waterville	Genesee Street, NY 12B, NY 315	Yes	Financially unsuccessful. Made public 1877.
Central Plank Road		December 15, 1847	12 miles (19 km)	Central Square - Hastings - Colosse - Maple View	US 11	Yes	
Salina, Liverpool, and Clay Plank Road		December 16, 1847	11 miles (18 km)	Salina - Liverpool - Clay	Park Street, Old Liverpool Road, Oswego Street, Tulip Street, Morgan Road	Yes	
Fultonville and Johnstown Plank Road		December 23, 1847	5 miles (8.0 km)	Fultonville - Fonda - Johnstown	Main Street, Bridge Street, NY 5, NY 30A, Chestnut Street, Madison Avenue	Yes	Authorized to abandon their road from Fultonville to Fonda 1877
Northern Plank Road		December 25, 1847	15 miles (24 km)	Deerfield Corners - Remsen	Trenton Road, NY 12, Plank Road, Old Route 12	Yes	On the bed of the old Utica Turnpike
Turin Plank Road		December 27, 1847	5 1/2 miles (8.9 km)	Through Turin	NY 26	Yes	
Brighton Plank Road		December 30, 1847	3 2/3 miles (5.9 km)	Rochester line - Brighton	NY 96	Yes	
Glens Falls and Lake George Plank Road		January 4, 1848	9 miles (14 km)	Glen's Falls - Caldwell	US 9	Yes	
Rome and Tabergh Plank Road		January 5, 1848	9 miles (14 km)	Rome - Tabergh	NY 69, Main Street	Yes	
Hamilton and Deansville Plank Road		January 6, 1848	15 miles (24 km)	Hamilton - Eaton - Madison - Augusta - Marshall - Deansville	Lake Morraine Road, Center Road, Lovejoy Road,	Yes	Abandoned 1874
Buffalo and Lancaster Plank Road		January 10, 1848	11 miles (18 km)	Lancaster - Buffalo	Broadway	Yes	Such a successful company that a festival was thrown in honor of its success
Auburn and Moravia Plank Road		January 15, 1848	18 miles (29 km)	Auburn - Moravia	Lake Avenue, NY 38, Warner Road, Long Hill Road, Aurora Street	Yes	Authorized to sell their road 1852
Syracuse and Massina Springs Plank Road		January 17, 1848	3 1/2 miles (5.6 km)			No	Followed the route that the Messina Plank Road would follow
Syracuse and Tully Plank Road	Main Road	January 18, 1848	19 1/2 miles (31.4 km)	Syracuse - Tully-Preble line	US 11, NY 11A, NY 80, NY 281	Yes	
Syracuse and Tully Plank Road	Branch	March 20, 1850		South Onondaga		No	
Baldwinsville Plank Road		January 26, 1848	3 1/4 miles (5.2 km)	Lysander		Yes	
Hannibalville and Fulton Plank Road		January 31, 1848	8 miles (13 km)	Hannibalville - Fulton	Oswego CR 3	Yes	
Batavia Street Plank Road		January 31, 1848	5 miles (8.0 km)		Broadway	Yes	
Lansingburgh Plank Road		February 1, 1848	2 1/2 miles (4.0 km)	Troy - Lansingburgh	US 4	Yes	1853: Authorized to lay a railroad on their road
Ilion and Cedarville Plank Road		February 1, 1848	8 miles (13 km)	Ilion - Cedarville	NY 51	Yes	
Dexter and Brownville Plank Road		February 14, 1848	7 miles (11 km)	Dexter - Brownville - Pamelia		Yes	Likely the same company as the Dexter, Brownville, and Pamelia Plank Road Co. Began operating from Dexter to Brownville January 1849, fully operational October 1850
Cazenovia and Chittenango Plank Road		February 15, 1848	8 miles (13 km)	Cazenovia - Chittenango	NY 13	Yes	1853: Reorganized as a turnpike of a similar name
West Martinsburgh and Copenhagen Plank Road		February 17, 1848	17 miles (27 km)	Turin-Martinsburgh line - Copenhagen	NY 12	Yes	
Mohawk and Richfield Springs Plank Road		February 26, 1848	12 miles (19 km)			No	
Central Square and Pine Plank Road		March 2, 1848	27 3/4 miles (44.7 km)	Central Square - Pine		Yes	Work had begun July, and was planned to be completed by next autumn. 1853: Eastern terminus changed to Vienna center.
Auburn and Cato Plank Road		March 6, 1848	16 miles (26 km)	Auburn - Cato	NY 34	Yes	
Southport Plank Road		March 27, 1848	13 miles (21 km)	Elmira - Pennsylvania line	Pennsylvania Avenue (Chemung CR 69)	Yes	
Sackett's Harbor and Ellisburgh Plank Road		March 29, 1848	20 miles (32 km)			No	
Amsterdam and Fish House Plank Road		March 30, 1848	17 miles (27 km)	Amsterdam - Vail Mills - Broadalbin - Northampton	Northampton Road, NY 30, Main Street, North Street, Fulton CR 110	Yes	
Clyde and Rose Plank Road		April 7, 1848	5 miles (8.0 km)	Clyde - Rose	NY 414	Yes	Ceded within Clyde to the village 1851. The rest of the west fork was abandoned 1853, though an eastern fork wasn't recorded on maps of the time.
Vernon and Verona Plank Road		April 21, 1848	9 1/2 miles (15.3 km)			No	
Adams and Ellisburgh Plank Road		May 31, 1848	10 1/2 miles (16.9 km)	Adams - Ellisburgh	US 11	Yes	Abandoned by 1855
Oswego, Hannibal, and Sterling Plank Road	Main Road	June 22, 1848	18 miles (29 km)	Oswego - Hannibal	NY 104, Oswego Street	Yes	
Oswego, Hannibal, and Sterling Plank Road	Branch	June 22, 1848	7 miles (11 km)	Southwest Oswego - Sterling Center - Sterling	NY 104A, Sterling Valley Road, Cayuga CR E98	Yes	
Oneida Valley Plank Road		June 27, 1848	13 miles (21 km)			No	
Camillus and Marcellus Plank Road		June 28, 1848	5 miles (8.0 km)	Camillus - Marcellus	NY 174	Yes	
Little Falls and Salisbury Plank Road		July 21, 1848	16 miles (26 km)	Little Falls - Salisbury Center - Deveraux	Loomis Street, NY 167, NY 29, NY 29A	Yes	
Fort Plain and Cooperstown Plank Road		September 27, 1848	24 miles (39 km)	Fort Plain - Cooperstown	NY 80	Yes	
West Turin and Leyden Plank Road		October 23, 1848	5 1/2 miles (8.9 km)	Leyden - West Turin - Turin	West Road	Yes	On the road of the Turin and Leyden Turnpike
Rochester and Greece Plank Road		October 23, 1848	9 1/2 miles (15.3 km)	Rochester - Greece		Yes	Though chartered to be longer, road in fact was less than 5 miles (8.0 km) long
Hampton and Whitesborough Plank Road		October 27, 1848	6 miles (9.7 km)			No	
Lowville and Denmark Plank Road		November 1, 1848	15 miles (24 km)			No	
Hamburgh and Eighteen-mile Creek Plank Road		November 3, 1848	7 miles (11 km)			No	
Lowville and Carthage Plank Road		November 8, 1848	16 1/2 miles (26.6 km)	Martinsburgh south line - Lowville - Denmark - Deer River - Carthage	Glenfield Road, Glendale Road, Jantzi Road ... East Road, Turin Road, NY 26	Yes	
Boonville Plank Road		November 8, 1848	20 miles (32 km)	Boonville - Turin south line	NY 12D, NY 26	Yes	
Salisbury and Manheim Plank Road		November 15, 1848	9 miles (14 km)	Little Falls - Salisbury	NY 170, Burrell Road, Military Road, Dairy Hill Road ... Black Creek Road, Bull Hill Road	Yes	Later extended to Graysville, which was later spun off to the Salisbury and Manehim Plank Road
Rome and Western Plank Road		November 28, 1848	11 miles (18 km)				
Great Bend and Copenhagen Plank Road		December 4, 1848	10 miles (16 km)	Great Bend - Champion - Copenhagen	Jefferson CR 47, CR 163, Lewis CR 16, CR 15	Yes	
Ogdensburgh and Heuvelton Plank Road		December 4, 1848	7 miles (11 km)	Ogdensburgh - Heuvelton	NY 812	Yes	
Antwerp, Sterlingville, and Great Bend Plank Road		December 8, 1848	12 miles (19 km)	Antwerp - Sterlingville - Great Bend - Watertown	... Antwerp Road, Madison Avenue		
Carthage and Antwerp Plank Road		December 8, 1848	17 miles (27 km)	Carthage - Antwerp	NY 3, US Military Highway, Main Street	Yes	
Johnstown and McEwen's Corners Plank Road		December 12, 1848	3 1/2 miles (5.6 km)			No	
Martinsburgh Plank Road		December 13, 1848	5 miles (8.0 km)	Through Martinsburgh	NY 26	Yes	
Au Sable Plank Road		December 19, 1848	16 miles (26 km)			Yes	Had already been authorized to collect tolls by 1852
Little Falls and Middleville Plank Road		December 19, 1848	10 miles (16 km)			No	
Watertown Central Plank Road		December 22, 1848	2 miles (3.2 km)	Watertown - Watertown Center	US 11	Yes	
Pamelia and Evan's Mills Plank Road		December 22, 1848	10 miles (16 km)	Evan's Mills - Watertown	US 11	Yes	
Watertown Plank and Turnpike Road		December 22, 1848	3 1/4 miles (5.2 km)	Rutland - Watertown	State Street	Yes	
Schenectady and Saratoga Plank Road		December 28, 1848	22 miles (35 km)	Schenectady - Saratoga Springs	NY 50	Yes	Opened their road July 1849
Rochester and Charlotte Plank Road		December 29, 1848	5 miles (8.0 km)	Rochester - Charlotte	Lake Road	Yes	
Utica and Waterville Central Plank Road		December 30, 1848	16 miles (26 km)	Utica - Waterville	Genesee Street, Paris Road, NY 12	Yes	
Gouverneur, Somerville, and Antwerp Plank Road		January 1, 1849	13 miles (21 km)	Gouverneur - Somerville - Antwerp	US 11	Yes	
Messina Plank Road		January 1, 1849	8 miles (13 km)	Syracuse - Manlius Center	NY 290	Yes	
Oswego Falls Plank Road		January 2, 1849	5 miles (8.0 km)			No	
Antwerp, Sprague's Corners, and Gouverneur Plank Road		January 2, 1849	12 miles (19 km)			No	
Schenectady and Duanesburgh Plank Road		January 4, 1849	20 miles (32 km)	Schenectady - Duanesburgh - Central Bridge	... Broadway, NY 7	Yes	
Lockport and Wright's Corners Plank Road		January 6, 1849	2 miles (3.2 km)	Lockport - Wrights Corners	NY 78	Yes	
Durhamville and Wood Creek Plank Road		January 6, 1849	9 miles (14 km)			Probably	Still in operation through 1854
Henrietta and Canton Falls Plank Road		January 10, 1849	10 miles (16 km)			No	
Saranac River Plank Road		January 12, 1849	24 miles (39 km)	Plattsburgh - Clayburg	NY 3	Yes	
Half Moon and Clifton Park Plank Road		January 12, 1849	8 miles (13 km)	Halfmoon - Clifton Park		Yes	Still in business by 1854, when the legislature authorized work to be done on the road
Westfield and Chautauqua Lake Plank Road		January 13, 1849	10 miles (16 km)	Barcelona - Westfield - Chautauqua Lake	NY 394, US 20, Chautauqua CR 308, Landing Road	Yes	Forked a mile above its southern end
Canandaigua and Port Gibson Plank Road		January 16, 1849	12 miles (19 km)			No	
Oswego and Syracuse Plank Road		January 19, 1849	32 miles (51 km)	Oswego - Fulton - Liverpool	NY 481/Oswego CR 57, Onondaga CR 57	Yes	Included a loop closer to Hinmansville along Oswego River Road and Hawthorne Road
Great Bend and Watertown Plank Road		January 23, 1849	10 miles (16 km)	Great Bend - Watertown	Water Street, NY 3	Yes	
Port Jackson and Union Falls Plank Road		January 29, 1849	25 miles (40 km)	Port Jackson - Union Falls		Yes	
Waterville and Earlville Plank Road		January 29, 1849	17 miles (27 km)	Waterville - Earlville	Earlville Road, Poolville Road, Cranston Road, NY 12	Yes	
Frankfort and Utica Plank Road		January 30, 1849	10 miles (16 km)	Frankfort - Utica	Old NY 5S	Yes	
Chittenango and Oneida Lake Plank Road		January 31, 1849	7 miles (11 km)	Chittenango - Lakeport	Genesee Street, Lakeport Road	Yes	Petitioned the legislature to abandon part of their road 1854
Russia and North Gage Plank Road		February 3, 1849	6 1/2 miles (10.5 km)	Northern Plank Road - North Gage - Russia	Crooked Brook Road, Cameron Hill Road ... NY 28, Gravesville Road, Russia Road	Yes	
Westfield and Clymer Plank Road		February 6, 1849	25 miles (40 km)	Westfield - Sherman - Pennsylvania line at Clyde	South Portage Street, West Second St, South Water Street, Chautauqua County Touring Route 21, Sherman Road, Kipp Street, West Main Street, Franklin Street, Mill Street, Cornish Street, CTR 15	Yes	
Chautauqua Central Plank Road		February 9, 1849	22 miles (35 km)			Yes	Authorized to sell their road 1861
Geneva and Rushville Plank Road		February 12, 1849	16 miles (26 km)	Geneva - Rushville	US 20, NY 14A, NY 245	Yes	Mostly known as the Geneva and Rushville Plank Road. Town of Seneca authorized to inspect the road 1862
Bridgeport and Hampton Plank Road		February 14, 1849	27 miles (43 km)			No	
Rutland and Champion Plank Road		February 17, 1849	8 miles (13 km)	Rutland - Champion	NY 126	Yes	Though histories had recorded that the road led to Copenhagen, a map from 1855 shows its terminus being Champion Village
Seneca Plank Road		February 19, 1849	17 miles (27 km)	New Hartford - Oneida Castle	NY 5	Yes	Company folded 1852
Dexter and Limerick Plank Road		February 22, 1849	4 2/3 miles (7.5 km)	Dexter - Limerick - Lyme line	NY 180, NY 12E	Yes	
Syracuse and Bridgeport Plank Road		February 22, 1849	12 miles (19 km)	Syracuse - Bridgeport	NY 298	Yes	
Bainbridge and Deposit Plank Road		February 26, 1849	17 miles (27 km)			No	
Heuvelton and Dekalb Plank Road		March 1, 1849	7 miles (11 km)	Heuvelton - DeKalb		Yes	Upon completion totaled 13 miles (21 km)
Bridgewater and Leonardsville Plank Road		March 3, 1849	8 miles (13 km)	Bridgewater - Leonardsville	NY 8	Yes	
Alexandria Bay and Theresa Plank Road		March 5, 1849	11 miles (18 km)	Alexandria Bay - Theresa	Church Street, NY 26, Jefferson CR 193	Yes	
Fultonville and Central Square Plank Road		March 5, 1849	15 miles (24 km)			No	Not to be confused with the Fulton and Central Square PR
Brockport and Clarkson Plank Road	Main Road	March 8, 1849	8 1/2 miles (13.7 km)			Yes	
Brockport and Clarkson Plank Road	Branch	March 8, 1849		Lake Road - Redman Road		Yes	
Theresa and Clayton Plank Road		March 12, 1849	16 miles (26 km)	Theresa - La Fargeville - Clayton		Yes	
Dexter and Hounsfield Plank Road		March 12, 1849	3 1/4 miles (5.2 km)	Dexter - Sackets Harbor	NY 180	Yes	
Oswego and Hastings Central Plank Road		March 19, 1849	20 miles (32 km)	Hastings Center - Oswego	Oswego CR 4	Yes	
Clyde and Savannah Plank Road		March 19, 1849	6 1/4 miles (10.1 km)			No	
Eaton and Georgetown Plank Road		March 21, 1849	13 miles (21 km)	Eaton-Madison line - Georgetown	Wendover Road, NY 26	Yes	
Binghamton and Chenango Forks Plank Road		March 22, 1849	11 miles (18 km)			No	
Delaware Plank Road		March 23, 1849	20 miles (32 km)	Walton - Hancock	South River Road, NY 10, Chase Brook Road ... NY 268	Yes	
Glens Falls and Moreau Plank Road		April 3, 1849	4 1/2 miles (7.2 km)	South Glens Falls - Moreau - Fort Edward	Main Street, Fort Edward Road	Yes	
Palmyra and Canandaigua Plank Road		April 13, 1849	9 miles (14 km)	Palmyra - Canandaigua	NY 21	Yes	
Cattaraugus and Buffalo Plank Road		April 28, 1849	32 miles (51 km)	Buffalo - Orchard Park - Ellicot - Florence - Buffum's Mills - New Boston - Springville - Sardinia	Abbot Road, Potter's Road, NY 240, NY 39	Yes	
Saratoga and Hadley Plank Road		April 28, 1849	16 miles (26 km)	Saratoga Springs - Hadley	NY 9N, Old Corinth Road	Yes	
New-Haven and Port Ontario Plank Road		May 5, 1849	10 miles (16 km)	New Haven - Port Ontario	Oswego CR 6, NY 104B, NY 3	Yes	
Burlington and Utica Plank Road		May 7, 1849	26 miles (42 km)	Utica - Burlington Flats	Albany Street, North Winfield Road, North Street, NY 51	Yes	Authorized to make public 1864
Schoharie and Albany Plank Road		May 23, 1849	32 miles (51 km)		NY 146, NY 443	Yes	Also known as the Albany and Schoharie Plank Road, and a company was supposedly incorporated
Seneca and Wayne Plank Road		June 1, 1849	14 miles (23 km)	Tyre - Seneca Falls - Fayette - Bearytown	Seneca CR 101, US 20, NY 414	Yes	
Cherry Valley Creek Plank Road		June 8, 1849	4 miles (6.4 km)	Cherry Valley - Rosebloom	NY 166	Yes	
Branchport and Penn Yan Plank Road		June 20, 1849	7 miles (11 km)	Branchport - Penn Yan	NY 54A	Yes	
Mohawk and Ilion Plank Road		June 21, 1849	1 1/2 miles (2.4 km)			No	
Gouverneur, Richville, and Canton Plank Road		July 9, 1849	16 miles (26 km)	Gouverneur - Richville - Canton line	US 11	Yes	
Albany and Sand Lake Plank Road		July 17, 1849	14 miles (23 km)	Rensselaer - Sand Lake - Nassau	NY 43	Yes	Most of the road purchased from Eastern Turnpike a few months prior to full incorporation
Canastota and Morrisville Plank Road		September 4, 1849	11 miles (18 km)	Canastota - Peterboro - Morrisville	Oxbow Road, Pleasant Valley Road, Old County Road, Cedar Street	Yes	
Fort Hunter and Albany Plank Road		September 12 & 17, 1849	22 miles (35 km)	Fort Hunter - Albany	US 20, NY 146, Fort Hunter Road, NY 7, NY 159, NY 30, Fort Hunter Road, NY 5S, Main Street, Church Street	Yes	
Johnstown and Pleasant Valley Plank Road		September 21, 1849	8 miles (13 km)	Johnstown - Pleasant Valley	NY 29	Yes	
Fort Plain and Canajoharie Plank Road		September 22, 1849	3 miles (4.8 km)			No	
Manlius Plank Road		October 6, 1849	9 miles (14 km)	Syracuse - Manlius	NY 5, NY 257	Yes	1853: Authorized to abandon the road north of the Syracuse and Utica Railroad
Watervleit Plank Road		October 13, 1849	3 1/2 miles (5.6 km)			Yes	1854: Authorized to be abandoned within West Troy
Winfield and Paris Plank Road		October 17, 1849	5 miles (8.0 km)	Cassville - West Winfield	Stone Road	Yes	
Delaware and Susquehannah Plank Road		October 22, 1849	14 miles (23 km)	Deposit - Bainbridge	Front Street, Second Street, Old Route 17, Old Plank Road, NY 41	Yes	
Lyons and Phelps Plank Road		October 24, 1849	5 miles (8.0 km)			No	
Mayfield and Broadalbin Plank Road		October 25, 1849	4 3/4 miles (7.6 km)			No	
Mayfield and Vail's Mills Plank Road		November 6, 1849				No	
Moravia and Plank Road		November 10, 1849	4 miles (6.4 km)			No	
Ephratah Plank Road		November 14, 1849	5 miles (8.0 km)	Ephratah - Johnstown	NY 67	Yes	
Auburn and Fleming Plank Road		November 23, 1849	6 miles (9.7 km)	Auburn - Fleming	NY 34	Yes	
Rochester and Gates Plank Road		November 30, 1849	6 miles (9.7 km)	Rochester - Gates - Chili	NY 33	Yes	
Brighton and Pittsford Plank Road		December 5, 1849	5 1/3 miles (8.6 km)			No	
Rochester and Monroe Spring Plank Road		December 8, 1849	3 1/3 miles (5.4 km)			No	
Sennett and Auburn Plank Road		December 12, 1849	4 miles (6.4 km)	Sennett - Auburn	NY 5	Yes	
Rochester and West Henrietta Plank Road		December 15, 1849	7 miles (11 km)	Rochester - West Henrietta	NY 15	Yes	
Palatine and Ephratah Plank Road		December 20, 1849	7 miles (11 km)			No	
Owasco Plank Road		December 20, 1849	8 miles (13 km)			No	
Lansingburgh, Brunswick, and Pittstown Plank Road		December 24, 1849	6 1/2 miles (10.5 km)			No	
Lockport and Cambria Plank Road		December 27, 1849	5 1/2 miles (8.9 km)	Lockport - Cambria	West Avenue, Upper Mountain Road, Gothic Hill Road, Lower Mountain Road	Yes	
Dansville and Wayland Plank Road		December 27, 1849	6 miles (9.7 km)	Dansville - Wayland	NY 63	Yes	
Rochester and Spencerport Plank Road		December 28, 1849	6 miles (9.7 km)	Rochester- Spencerport	NY 31	Yes	Toll booths still on the road well after deplanking
Rochester and Webster Plank Road		December 28, 1849	7 miles (11 km)	Rochester - Webster	Webster Avenue, Bay Street, Culver Road, Empire Boulevard, NY 404	Yes	Had branches
The Plank Road		1850	19 miles (31 km)	South Otselic - Hamilton	Gorge Road	Yes	
Niagara Falls and Lewiston Plank Road		January 5, 1850	7 miles (11 km)	Niagara Falls - Lewiston	NY 104, Portage Road, Center Street	Yes	1851: Authorized to erect a second booth on their road
Albion Plank Road		January 5, 1850	2 miles (3.2 km)	Albion - Gaines	NY 98, NY 279	Yes	
Waterford and Half Moon Plank Road		January 9, 1850	5 miles (8.0 km)			No	
Canajoharie and Spraker's Basin Plank Road		January 9, 1850	3 miles (4.8 km)			No	
Cato and Victory Plank Road		January 14, 1850	5 miles (8.0 km)	Cato - Victory	NY 370, Old State Road	Yes	1851: Authorized to construct only 4 miles of what was initially planned
Vienna and Clifton Plank Road		January 14, 1850	5 miles (8.0 km)	Vienna - Clifton Springs|		Yes	Also known as the Vienna and Clifton Springs Plank Road. Toll gates were erected.
Middletown and Bloomingburgh Plank Road		January 16, 1850	8 miles (13 km)	Middletown - Bloomingburgh	NY 17M	Yes	
Utica Deerfield and Schuyler Plank Road		January 18, 1850	2 3/4 miles (4.4 km)			No	
Madison and Earlville Plank Road		January 21, 1850	16 1/2 miles (26.6 km)	Madison - Oriskany Falls - Earlville		No	
Oxford and Norwich Plank Road		January 21, 1850	8 miles (13 km)			No	
Barre Plank Road		January 21, 1850	4 1/2 miles (7.2 km)			No	
Albany and Mohawk Plank Road		January 23, 1850	11 miles (18 km)	Albany - Crescent	US 9	Yes	
Cazenovia and De Ruyter Plank Road		January 23, 1850	6 miles (9.7 km)	Cazenovia - DeRuyter	NY 13 (Delphi Road, Kiley Road, DeRuyter Reservoir Road, Reservoir Road, East Lake Road)	Yes	
Auburn and Port Byron Plank Road		January 26, 1850	9 3/4 miles (15.7 km)	Auburn - Port Byron	NY 38	Yes	
Macedon and Victor Plank Road	Main Road	January 26, 1850	10 miles (16 km)	Macedon - East Victor	NY 31, Victor Road, Bowerman Road, Brownsville Road, Plastermill Road, NY 96, NY 444, US 20, US 20A, NY 64	Yes	Name changed to Macedon and Bristol Plank Road the year of incorporation, and was extended to Bristol Center. Authorized to sell 1855
Macedon and Victor Plank Road	Branch	January 26, 1850	10 miles (16 km)	Macedon - Perinton line	NY 31	Yes	
Warrensburg and Chester Plank Road		January 29, 1850	17 1/2 miles (28.2 km)	Lake George - Warrensburg - Chester	US 9	Yes	
Hammond, Rossie, and Antwerp Plank Road		January 29, 1850	18 miles (29 km)	Hammond - Rossie - Antwerp	Jefferson CR 31, CR 3, CR 25, CR 24	Yes	1857: Authorized to extend southernly along the Gouverneur, Somerville, and Antwerp PR
Fort Edward and Fort Miller Plank Road		January 30, 1850	2 1/2 miles (4.0 km)	Fort Edward - Fort Miller		Yes	Had the right to extend to the bridge at Thomson
Sandy Hill and Adamsville Plank Road		January 30, 1850	5 1/2 miles (8.9 km)	Sandy Hill - Adamsville	NY 196	Yes	
Morristown Hammond Alexandria and Theresa Plank Road		January 30, 1850	24 miles (39 km)			No	
Hannibal Sterling and Wolcott Plank Road		February 1, 1850	16 miles (26 km)	Hannibal - Red Creek - Wolcott	NY 104	Yes	1857: Terms outlined for sale
Theresa Plank Road		February 2, 1850	4 1/2 miles (7.2 km)	Theresa - Evan's Mills		Yes	
Jordan and Cato Plank Road		February 4, 1850	10 miles (16 km)			Yes	
Waterloo Ontario and Wayne Plank Road		February 4, 1850	9 miles (14 km)			No	
Waterloo and Fayette Plank Road		February 4, 1850	6 3/4 miles (10.9 km)	Waterloo - Fayette-Varick line		Yes	
Hammondsport and Bath Plank Road	Main Road	February 6, 1850	12 miles (19 km)	Hammondsport - Bath - Kennedyville	NY 54	Yes	1853: Authorized to not build a road into Hammondsport in exchange for making a branch
Hammondsport and Bath Plank Road	Branch	April 12, 1853		Urbana - Mitchellville	Steuben CR 88, CR 89	Yes	
De Ruyter Plank Road		February 6, 1850	7 miles (11 km)			Yes	
Ulster and Delaware Plank Road		February 6, 1850	36 miles (58 km)	Kingston - Pine Hill		Yes	
Cedarville and Schuyler's Lake Plank Road		February 7, 1850	7 miles (11 km)	Schuyler Lake - Cedarville	NY 28, Hyder Road, Otsego CR 25, CR 24, US 20, Herkimer CR 177, NY 51	Yes	1853: Authorized to not build the part of their road on the Third Great Western TP
Ogdensburgh and Canton Road		February 16, 1850	18 miles (29 km)	Ogdensburgh - Canton Falls	NY 68	Yes	Had earlier organized as a turnpike; this act converted it to a plank road
Albany, Rensselaerville, and Schoharie Plank Road		March 24, 1850		Albany - Gallupville	New Scotland Road, NY 85, The Old Road, Indian Ledge Road, Wolf Hill Road, Pinnacle Road, NY 443	Yes	
Newburgh and Ellenville Plank Road	Main Road	March 24, 1850		Ellenville - Newburgh	Washington Street, Washington Terrace, Dupont Avenue, South Street, NY 52	Yes	1853: Authorized to abandon, at their discretion, their road south of the Cochecton Turnpike and their branch, though it didn't happen at the time.
Newburgh and Ellenville Plank Road	Branch	1853		Saint Andrews - Wallkill	Saint Andrews Road, Lake Osiris Road, Bordens Road	Yes	
Newburgh and Shawangunk Plank Road		March 24, 1850		Wallkill - Newburgh	Water Street, Leroy Place, North Street, Plank Road, NY 32, NY 300	Yes	Abandoned within Newburgh 1853
Clinton Prison Plank Road		April 10, 1850		Clinton Correctional Facility - Saranac River Plank Road	NY 374	Yes	
Brabrant Plank Road				Mutton Hollow - Sawkill	Morey Hill Road	Yes	
Newtown and Maspeth Plank Road		1850-1851		Newtown - Maspeth	Grand Avenue	Yes	
Medina and Alabama Plank Road		1850-1851		Ridgeway - Medina - Alabama	NY 63	Yes	Also known as the Ridgeway, Medina, and Alabama Plank Road
Auburn and Aurelius Plank Road		1850-1851		Auburn - Aurelius	Clark Street, US 20	Yes	
Delhi Plank Road		1850-1851		Delhi - Hamden - Walton	NY 10	Yes	On the bed of the Ulster and Delaware Turnpike
Union Plank Road	Main Road	1850-1851		Esopus Creek - Kingston	Washington Avenue, North Front Street, Wall Street	Yes	
Union Plank Road	West Fork	1850-1851		Kingston - Wilbur	Wall Street, Henry Street, Wilbur Avenue, Dunn Street	Yes	
Union Plank Road	East Fork	1850-1851		Kingston - Rondout	Pearl Street, Clinton Avenue, Saint James Avenue, Broadway	Yes	
Lockport and Warren's Corners Plank Road		1850-1851		Lockport - Warren's Corners	Gooding Street, Jackson Street, Plank Road, Stone Road	Yes	
Manlius and Delphi Plank Road		1850-1851		Manlius - Delphi	NY 92, Oran-Delphi Road ...	Yes	
Jamaica and Brooklyn Plank Road		1850-1851		Brooklyn - Jamaica	Fulton Street, Jamaica Avenue	Yes	
Cherry Valley and Fort Plain Plank Road		1850-1851		Cherry Valley - Fort Plain	NY 163, Montgomery CR 82, Otsego CR 32, NY 166	Yes	
Schoharie and Richmondville Plank Road		1850-1851		Schoharie - Mineral Springs - Richmondville	Schoharie CR 1A, NY 145, CR 1, NY 7	Yes	
Angelica and Belvidere Plank Road		1850-1851		Angelica - Belvidere	Allegany CR 20	Yes	
Jamestown Plank Road		1851		Carroll-Jamestown - Gerry-Ellicot line	Chautauqua CR 380, Van Cobb Road, NY 60	Yes	
Hermon Plank Road		March 1, 1851		Marshville - Dekalb-Canton line	Saint Lawrence CR 21, Church Street, Main Street, Water Street, Dekalb Junction-Russell Road, Cousintown Road	Yes	Proposed to extend to Edwards and Carthage
Belfast and Angelica Plank Road		March 23, 1851		Belfast - Angelica	Allegany CR 26, Old State Road ... Joncy Road, CR 16	Yes	
Coxsackie and Oak Hill Plank Road		1850-1852		Coxsackie - Greenville - Oak Hill	NY 81 (Old Plank Road, King Hill-Earlton Road), Old Plank Road, Plank Road	Yes	
Evan's Mills and Oxbow Plank Road		1850-1852	17 miles (27 km)	Evan's Mills - Oxbow	North Main Street, Elm Ridge Road, Ore Bed Road, Jefferson CR 23, Pulpit Rock Road	Yes	
Ellenville and Fallsburgh Plank Road		1850-1852		Ellenville - Woodbourne	NY 52	Yes	Acquired from the Fallsburgh Turnpike 1852
Rochester and Hemlock Lake Plank Road		1850-1852		Rochester - Hemlock	NY 15A	Yes	
Lisle and Forestburgh Plank Road		1850-1852		Mount Hope - Forestburgh	Mount Hope Avenue, Highland Avenue, Main Street, NY 211 (Galley Hill Road, Horse Shoe Bend Road), Oakland Valley Road, Hartwood Road	Yes	Purchased from the Mount Hope and Lumberland Turnpike
Reservation Central Plank Road		1850-1852		East Seneca - Elma Center	Bullis Road	Partly	
Livingston, Allegany, and Steuben Plank Road		1850-1852		Sparta - Dansville	NY 63	Yes	Name changed to the Sparta and Dansville Plank Road 1852.
Western Plank Road		1850-1852		McLenathan Falls - Franklin-Black Brook line	Plank Road	Yes	
Palmyra and Pultneyville Plank Road		1850-1852		Palmyra - Marion - Pultneyville	NY 21, Lake Avenue, Jay Street	Yes	Made public 1861
Monterey, Cooper's Plains, Painted Post, and Corning Plank Road		1852		Corning - Painted Post - Coopers Plains - Monterey	NY 415, Main Street, Steuben CR 26, Schuyler CR 16	Yes	
Fredonia and Sinclairville Plank Road		1850-1853		Fredonia - Sinclairville - Gerry - Ellicot line	Eagle Street, NY 60 (... Canandaigua CR 133), Salisbury Road	Yes	
Brooklyn, Flatbush, and Canarsie Plank Road		1850-1853		Brooklyn line - Flatbush - Canarsie	Flatbush Avenue, Cortelyou Road ...	Yes	
Ransomville Plank Road		1850-1853					
Monticello and Wurtsboro Plank Road		~1853				No	Authorized the year of incorporation to purchase their road from the Newburgh-Cochecton TP
Pulaski and Selkirk Plank Road		1853				No	Was to acquire their road from the Salmon River Plank Road
Myrtle Avenue and Jamaica Plank Road		1850-1853		Brooklyn - Richmond Hill	Myrtle Avenue	Yes	
Bristol Center and South Bristol Plank Road		1850-1853		Bristol - South Bristol		No	
Jordan and Skaneateles Plank Road		1850-1853		Skaneateles - Elbridge - Jordan	NY 317, Onondaga CR 122, CR 22	Yes	
Mongaup Valley, Forestburgh, and Port Jervis Plank Road		1850-1853		Mongaup Valley - Forestburgh - Port Jervis	Plank Road ... Starlight Road, Plank Road, Griffin Road, NY 42, Old Forestburgh Road, Old Cahoonzie Road, Cemetery Road, Main Street, Sleepy Hollow Road, Main Street	Yes	1857: Road purchased by the Orange and Sullivan Plank Road Co.
Frewsburg Plank Road		July 18, 1853, c. 535		Kiantone - Frewsburg	US 62	Yes	
Philipsville and Belfast Plank Road		1850-1853		Philipsville - Belfast		No	
Havana and Newfield Plank Road		1850-1853		Havana - Newfield	Broadway, Cotton Hanlon Road, MacDowell Road, Main Street, Coddington Place, Fowler Place, NY 224, CR 11	Yes	Had constructed their road by 1853 when toll gate locations were changed. Had a branch from Odessa
New Berlin and Brookfield Plank Road		1850-1853				No	
Flatbush Plank Road		1850-1853		Flatbush - Flatlands	Flatbush Avenue	Yes	
Richmondville and Summit Plank Road		1850-1858		Richmondville -	Summit Street, NY 10	Yes	
Salisbury and Manehim Plank Road		April 12, 1856, c. 182		Salisbury - Gray	Military Road, Dairy Hill Road ... Black Creek Road, Bull Hill Road	Yes	
Canastota and Morrisville New Plank Road		1850-1858				Yes	
Madison and Hamilton Plank Road		1850-1859				Yes	

== See also ==
- Plank Road Boom
- List of turnpikes in New York
