= Towpath Mountain =

Mountain in New York, United States

- Location within New York Adirondack Park Location within the United States

Highest point
- Elevation: 1,942 feet (592 m)
- Coordinates: 42°33′34″N 74°25′33″W

Geography
- Location: NNW of Breakabeen, New York, U.S.
- Topo map: USGS Breakabeen

Towpath Mountain is a mountain in Schoharie County, New York. It is located north-northwest of Breakabeen. Walhalla Rocks is located southeast and Rossman Hill is located west-southwest of Towpath Mountain.
