= House at 461 Spruce Lake Road =

Historic house in New York, United States

- U.S. National Register of Historic Places
- Location within New York Location within the United States
- Location: 461 Spruce Lake Road, Summit, New York
- Coordinates: 42°35′04″N 74°35′58″W
- Area: Less than 1 acre (0.40 ha)
- Built: c. 1850
- Architectural style: Greek Revival
- NRHP reference No.: 14001130
- Added to NRHP: January 7, 2015

House at 461 Spruce Lake Road is a historic home located in Summit, Schoharie County, New York. It was built about 1850, and is a two-story, double pile, front-gable form vernacular Greek Revival style dwelling with a one-story, single pile, side wing. The main block and most of side wing is board-wall construction consisting of horizontally-stacked hemlock planks. The front facade features corner pilasters and a moulded projecting cornice.

It was listed on the National Register of Historic Places in 2015.
