= Hempstead and Babylon Turnpike =

- Nassau County Route D11; Hempstead–Babylon Turnpike; Babylon Turnpike; South Oyster Bay Turnpike
- Hempstead and Babylon Turnpike (CR D11), highlighted in red

Route information
- Maintained by NCDPW
- Length: 2.62 mi (4.22 km)

Major junctions
- West end: Nassau Road (CR 7B) in Roosevelt
- Seaman Avenue (CR E21) in Roosevelt; Meadowbrook State Parkway in Freeport; NY 27 (Sunrise Highway) in Merrick
- East end: Merrick Road (CR 27) and Babylon Road in Merrick

Location
- Country: United States
- State: New York
- County: Nassau

Highway system
- County routes in New York; County Routes in Nassau County

The Hempstead and Babylon Turnpike (also known as the Hempstead–Babylon Turnpike or simply Babylon Turnpike) is a 2.62-mile (4.22 km) county road connecting Roosevelt and Merrick within the Town of Hempstead, in Nassau County, New York, United States.

Owned by Nassau County and maintained by the Nassau County Department of Public Works, the road is designated by the county as the unsigned Nassau County Route D11.

== Route description ==
Babylon Turnpike begins at Nassau Road (CR 7B) in the heart of the hamlet of Roosevelt. It then continues southeast through the southeastern portions of the hamlet, soon intersecting Seaman Avenue (CR E21) before continuing southeast along (and forming) portions of the Freeport–Roosevelt municipal border until reaching an intersection with Grand Avenue (CR C99) and Lakeview Avenue, along said border.

At its intersection with CR C99 and Lakeview Avenue, Babylon Turnpike veers to the east, crossing over – and interchanging with – the Meadowbrook State Parkway and entering the hamlet of Merrick, intersecting Meadowbrook Road immediately thereafter, at which point Babylon Turnpike veers back to the southeast.

Continuing southeast from Meadowbrook Road, Babylon Turnpike soon passes beneath the Babylon and Montauk branches of the Long Island Rail Road, thence intersects Sunrise Highway (New York State Route 27) immediately thereafter.

South of NY 27, Babylon Turnpike continues southeast, eventually reaching Merrick Road (CR 27) – the southern terminus of both the CR D11 route designation and of the modern-day application of the Hempstead–Babylon Turnpike's name. The roadway continues south from there for a short distance, as the Town of Hempstead-maintained Babylon Road.

Babylon Turnpike – in its entirety – is classified as a minor arterial road by the New York State Department of Transportation and is eligible for federal aid.

== History ==
The Hempstead–Babylon Turnpike was originally chartered by New York state on April 7, 1817, as the South Oyster Bay Turnpike. Built as a tolled plank road by the South Oyster Bay Turnpike Co. and completed by the 1850s, this roadway was built to link what is now the Village of Hempstead in Nassau County with Babylon in adjacent Suffolk County, to the east; the name was applied to the entire road – as well as Nassau Road and Greenwich Street (present-day Nassau County Route 7B) in Roosevelt and Hempstead, continuing north from Babylon Turnpike's present-day western terminus. Eventually, the portion of the highway east from the present eastern terminus of CR D11 in Merrick east to Amityville was renamed as a segment of Merrick Road, thence becoming Montauk Highway continuing east therefrom – and, in turn, truncating the Hempstead–Babylon Turnpike name to its current length. Likewise, the portions north and west of its junction with present-day CR 7B were renamed Nassau Road and Greenwich Street. Furthermore, the portions of Merrick Road extending from present-day CR D11 west to Jamaica, Queens, were constructed as another tolled plank road by the Jamaica Plank Road Co.

When first built, the Hempstead and Babylon Plank Road was the only road directly connecting Freeport to points east on Long Island.

=== Route number and signage ===
Former route shield for CR 7A

Beginning in 1959, when the Nassau County Department of Public Works created a numbered highway system as part of their "Master Plan" for the county highway system, Babylon Turnpike was originally designated as County Route 7A. This route, along with all of the other county routes in Nassau County, became unsigned in the 1970s, when Nassau County officials opted to remove the signs as opposed to allocating the funds for replacing them with new ones that met the latest federal design standards and requirements stated in the federal government's Manual on Uniform Traffic Control Devices.

Subsequently, Nassau County renumbered many of its county roads, with Babylon Turnpike being renumbered as Nassau County Route D11. Meanwhile, the CR 7A designation was transferred to the portion of existing CR 7 between Hempstead and Roslyn, to the north.

== Major intersections ==
Location	mi	km	Destinations	Notes
Roosevelt	0.00	0.00	Nassau Road (CR 7B)	Western terminus
Roosevelt	0.17	0.27	Centennial Avenue (CR C34)	Pedestrian access to Centennial County Park
Roosevelt	1.14	1.83	Seaman Avenue (CR E21)	
Freeport–Roosevelt line	1.25	2.01	Grand Avenue (CR C99) and Lakeview Avenue	
Freeport–Roosevelt– Merrick tripoint	1.50	2.41	Meadowbrook State Parkway – Mineola, Jones Beach	Exits M7E-W on Meadowbrook State Parkway; Cloverleaf interchange
Merrick	1.64	2.64	Meadowbrook Road	
Merrick	2.01	3.23	NY 27 (Sunrise Highway)	At-grade intersection
Merrick	2.62	4.22	Merrick Road (CR 27) and Babylon Road	Present eastern terminus
1.000 mi = 1.609 km; 1.000 km = 0.621 mi

== See also ==
- List of county routes in Nassau County, New York
- List of turnpikes in New York
- List of plank roads in New York
- Hempstead Turnpike
- Merrick Road
