= Rossman Hill =

Mountain in New York, United States

- Location within New York Adirondack Park Location within the United States

Highest point
- Elevation: 2,080 feet (630 m)
- Coordinates: 42°33′02″N 74°28′53″W

Geography
- Location: NW of North Blenheim, New York, U.S.
- Topo map: USGS Breakabeen

Rossman Hill is a mountain in Schoharie County, New York. It is located northwest of North Blenheim. Fulton Hill is located northwest, Towpath Mountain is located east-northeast, and Burnt Hill is located south of Rossman Hill.
