= New Concord Historic District =

Historic district in New York, United States

- U.S. National Register of Historic Places
- U.S. Historic district
- Location within New York Location within the United States
- Location: County Route 9, New Concord, New York
- Coordinates: 42°23′43.3″N 73°31′35.41″W
- Area: 182.74 acres (73.95 ha)
- NRHP reference No.: 09001268
- Added to NRHP: January 19, 2010

New Concord Historic District is a national historic district located at New Concord in Columbia County, New York. The district includes 31 contributing buildings, one contributing site, and eight contributing structures. It encompasses mostly domestic properties and related outbuildings, most all of frame construction and the majority built in the early- to mid-19th century.

It was listed on the National Register of Historic Places in 2010.
