= Summit, New York =

- Town
- Location in Schoharie County and the state of New York.
- Coordinates: 42°34′21″N 74°36′4″W
- Country: United States
- State: New York
- County: Schoharie

Area
  - Total: 37.48 sq mi (97.08 km^{2})
  - Land: 37.09 sq mi (96.05 km^{2})
  - Water: 0.40 sq mi (1.03 km^{2})
- Elevation: 2,170 ft (660 m)

Population (2020)
  - Total: 1,072
- Time zone: UTC-5 (Eastern (EST))
  - Summer (DST): UTC-4 (EDT)
- ZIP code: 12175
- Area code: 518
- FIPS code: 36-72070
- GNIS feature ID: 0979537
- Website: Town website

Summit is a town in Schoharie County, New York, United States. The population was 1,072 at the time of the 2020 census. The name is derived from a peak (Mt. Wharton) that was thought to be the highest elevation in the county.

The Town of Summit is on the western border of the county and is northeast of Oneonta.

== History ==
The first settlement began around 1794, after the end of the American Revolution.

Summit was created in 1819 from parts of the Towns of Jefferson and Cobleskill.

The House at 461 Spruce Lake Road was listed on the National Register of Historic Places in 2015.

== Geography ==
According to the United States Census Bureau, the town has a total area of 37.5 square miles (97 km^{2}), of which 37.1 square miles (96 km^{2}) is land and 0.3 square miles (0.78 km^{2}) (0.91%) is water.

Mount Wharton in Summit is the highest location (approximately 2400 feet) in Schoharie County. The mountain is named after the land owner of the property. Charlotte Creek, a tributary of the Susquehanna River, flows southwestward from the town.

The western town line is the border of Otsego County.

New York State Route 10 is a north–south highway.

== Demographics ==
Historical population
| Census | Pop. | Note | %± |
|---|---|---|---|
| 1820 | 1,468 | | — |
| 1830 | 1,733 | | 18.1% |
| 1840 | 2,010 | | 16.0% |
| 1850 | 1,800 | | −10.4% |
| 1860 | 1,924 | | 6.9% |
| 1870 | 1,631 | | −15.2% |
| 1880 | 1,405 | | −13.9% |
| 1890 | 1,399 | | −0.4% |
| 1900 | 1,217 | | −13.0% |
| 1910 | 1,105 | | −9.2% |
| 1920 | 871 | | −21.2% |
| 1930 | 705 | | −19.1% |
| 1940 | 790 | | 12.1% |
| 1950 | 850 | | 7.6% |
| 1960 | 704 | | −17.2% |
| 1970 | 690 | | −2.0% |
| 1980 | 903 | | 30.9% |
| 1990 | 973 | | 7.8% |
| 2000 | 1,123 | | 15.4% |
| 2010 | 1,148 | | 2.2% |
| 2020 | 1,072 | | −6.6% |
U.S. Decennial Census

As of the census of 2000, there were 1,123 people, 459 households, and 313 families residing in the town. The population density was 30.2 inhabitants per square mile (11.7/km^{2}). There were 879 housing units at an average density of 23.7 per square mile (9.2/km^{2}). The racial makeup of the town was 97.15% White, 1.25% African American, 0.18% Native American, 0.27% Asian, 0.09% Pacific Islander, 0.36% from other races, and 0.71% from two or more races. Hispanic or Latino of any race were 1.07% of the population.

There were 459 households, out of which 26.4% had children under the age of 18 living with them, 54.9% were married couples living together, 8.1% had a female householder with no husband present, and 31.6% were non-families. 24.2% of all households were made up of individuals, and 9.6% had someone living alone who was 65 years of age or older. The average household size was 2.45 and the average family size was 2.83.

In the town, the population was spread out, with 22.8% under the age of 18, 5.3% from 18 to 24, 24.5% from 25 to 44, 31.7% from 45 to 64, and 15.8% who were 65 years of age or older. The median age was 44 years. For every 100 females, there were 105.3 males. For every 100 females age 18 and over, there were 105.9 males.

The median income for a household in the town was $37,386, and the median income for a family was $40,139. Males had a median income of $32,279 versus $24,792 for females. The per capita income for the town was $16,778. About 10.9% of families and 15.9% of the population were below the poverty line, including 22.8% of those under age 18 and 12.9% of those age 65 or over.

== Communities and locations in Summit ==
- Beards Hollow – A hamlet on the town line in the northeastern part of the town on County Road 23.
- Bear Gulch – A valley in the northern part of Summit.
- Bear Gulch Lake – A small lake southeast of Summit village.
- Charlotte Creek – A stream flowing out of the southwestern part of Summit through Charlotte Valley.
- Charlotte Valley – A long valley in the southwestern section of Summit.
- Charlotteville – A hamlet in the southwestern part of the town in Charlotte Valley at County Roads 6 and 64. A Methodist seminary that operated from 1850 to 1875 once made this community the most populous in the town.
- Eminence – A location southeast of Summit village, once called "Dutch Hill."
- Lutheranville – A hamlet west of Summit village near the western town line. It was once called "Tar Hollow" due to a tarring and feathering incident.
- Rossman Pond – A lake in the northeastern corner of Summit.
- Summit – The hamlet of Summit is located on NY-10 at County Roads 6, 16, and 20 in the eastern part of the town. It was at one time called "Summit Four Corners."
- Summit Lake – A small lake northeast of Summit village.

== Notable person ==
- John Frank Morrison, U.S. Army major general, born in Charlotteville
