= West Fulton, New York =

- Hamlet
- Location within New York Location within the United States
- Coordinates: 42°33′52″N 74°27′50″W
- Country: United States
- State: New York
- County: Schoharie
- Elevation: 1,158 ft (353 m)
- Time zone: UTC-5 (Eastern (EST))
  - Summer (DST): UTC-4 (EDT)
- ZIP code: 12194
- Area codes: 518 & 838
- GNIS feature ID: 969229

West Fulton is a hamlet in Schoharie County, New York, United States. The community is 7.2 miles (11.6 km) south of Cobleskill. West Fulton has a post office with ZIP code 12194.
