= Central Square, New York =

- Village
- Location in Oswego County and the state of New York.
- Coordinates: 43°17′3″N 76°8′46″W
- Country: United States
- State: New York
- County: Oswego

Area
  - Total: 1.91 sq mi (4.94 km^{2})
  - Land: 1.91 sq mi (4.94 km^{2})
  - Water: 0 sq mi (0.00 km^{2})
- Elevation: 449 ft (137 m)

Population (2020)
  - Total: 1,862
  - Density: 976.8/sq mi (377.14/km^{2})
- Time zone: UTC-5 (Eastern (EST))
  - Summer (DST): UTC-4 (EDT)
- ZIP code: 13036
- Area code: 315
- FIPS code: 36-13585
- GNIS feature ID: 0946322
- Website: Village website

Central Square is a village in Oswego County, New York, United States. As of the 2020 census, Central Square had a population of 1,862. The village is located in the southern part of the town of Hastings on Route 49 and U.S. Route 11. It is west of Interstate 81 and northwest of Oneida Lake.

== History ==
The site was the crossing of Native American trails that became crossroads of the early settlers. Central Square was first called "Loomis Corners" after Chester Loomis, who built a hotel there. Later, the community also became a railroad junction.

The village was incorporated in 1890.

The central part of the village was devastated by a fire in 1929.

== Geography ==
Central Square is located at 43°17′3″N 76°8′46″W (43.284082, -76.146004).

According to the United States Census Bureau, the village has a total area of 1.9 square miles (4.9 km^{2}), all land.

The Central Square School District is a part of the village of Central Square.

== Demographics ==
Historical population
Census	Pop.	Note	%±
1870	359		—
1880	309		−13.9%
1900	364		—
1910	429		17.9%
1920	448		4.4%
1930	542		21.0%
1940	568		4.8%
1950	665		17.1%
1960	935		40.6%
1970	1,298		38.8%
1980	1,418		9.2%
1990	1,671		17.8%
2000	1,646		−1.5%
2010	1,848		12.3%
2020	1,862		0.8%
U.S. Decennial Census

At the 2000 census there were 1,646 people, 752 households, and 430 families in the village. The population density was 888.2 inhabitants per square mile (342.9/km^{2}). There were 796 housing units at an average density of 429.5 per square mile (165.8/km^{2}). The racial makeup of the village was 98.06% White, 0.61% African American, 0.06% Native American, 0.73% Asian, 0.12% from other races, and 0.43% from two or more races. Hispanic or Latino of any race were 0.91%.

Of the 752 households 26.9% had children under the age of 18 living with them, 43.2% were married couples living together, 10.5% had a female householder with no husband present, and 42.7% were non-families. 36.4% of households were one person and 18.9% were one person aged 65 or older. The average household size was 2.19 and the average family size was 2.84.

The age distribution was 22.3% under the age of 18, 8.3% from 18 to 24, 27.6% from 25 to 44, 22.7% from 45 to 64, and 19.1% 65 or older. The median age was 39 years. For every 100 females, there were 84.9 males. For every 100 females age 18 and over, there were 83.0 males.

The median household income was $31,875 and the median family income was $45,441. Males had a median income of $34,583 versus $25,078 for females. The per capita income for the village was $20,946. About 8.6% of families and 12.5% of the population were below the poverty line, including 13.7% of those under age 18 and 12.6% of those age 65 or over.
