= County Route 18 (Otsego County, New York) =

Highway in Otsego County, New York, US

County Route 18
- Map of Otsego County in central New York with CR 18 highlighted in red, spurs in blue, and former NY 413 backed in pink

Route information
- Maintained by Otsego County Highway Department
- Length: 34.83 mi (56.05 km)

Major junctions
- South end: NY 51 in Butternuts
- US 20 near Bridgewater
- North end: CR 2 at the Oneida County line in Plainfield

Location
- Country: United States
- State: New York
- County: Otsego

Highway system
- County routes in New York; County Routes in Otsego County
← NY 412	NY 413	→ NY 414

County Route 18 (CR 18) is a county-maintained highway in western Otsego County, New York, in the United States. It extends for 34.83 miles (56.05 km) from an intersection with New York State Route 51 (NY 51) in the town of Butternuts to the Oneida County line at Plainfield, where it becomes CR 2. The highway runs along the eastern bank of the Unadilla River and parallels NY 8, which follows the western bank of the river. CR 18 enters the vicinity of several villages and hamlets, including the village of New Berlin and the hamlet of Unadilla Forks.

The portion of CR 18 between Unadilla Forks and U.S. Route 20 (US 20) in Plainfield—a distance of 2.52 miles (4.06 km)—was originally maintained by the state of New York. It was added to the state highway system in 1916 and designated as New York State Route 413 c. 1931. The NY 413 designation was removed in the early 1950s.

== Route description ==
=== Mount Upton to New Berlin ===
CR 18 begins at an intersection with NY 51 in the town of Butternuts, located east of the hamlet of Mount Upton on the eastern bank of the Unadilla River. CR 18 heads northward, passing along the base of the Unadilla River valley as it heads along the east bank of the river and parallels NY 8, which runs along the western bank. As the route heads away from Mount Upton, it heads through a dense forest situated at the foot of the valley's eastern edge. The forest continues to surround CR 18 until the vicinity of Lathams Corners, where the forest gives way to open fields and smaller, isolated patches of trees.

North of Lathams Corners, CR 18 serves as a divider between a series of cultivated fields on the east bank of the river and a dense forest enveloping the eastern edge of the valley. The route continues to parallel both NY 8 and the Unadilla River into the hamlet of South New Berlin, a community centered around the intersection of NY 8 and NY 23. CR 18 meets NY 23 a short distance to the east at a junction situated on the Butternuts–Morris town line. Past the intersection, CR 18 passes through the eastern extents of the hamlet before continuing northeastward through open fields.

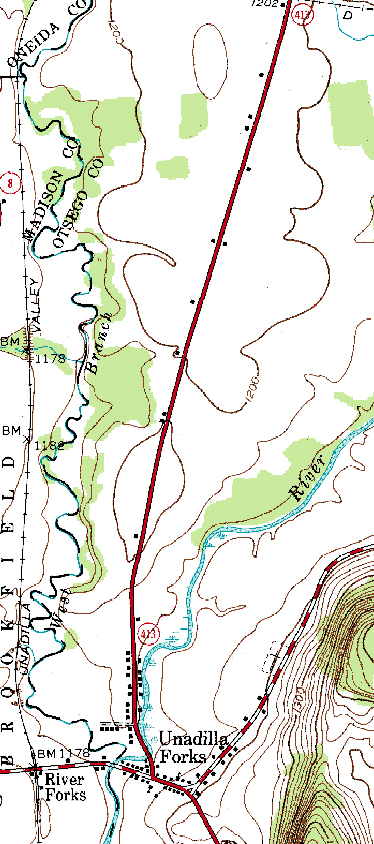
NY 413 topo map, depicting its entire length

Roughly 4 miles (6 km) northeast of South New Berlin in the town of Pittsfield, CR 18 turns back to the north as it continues to mirror the twists and turns of the Unadilla River. It passes by the hamlet of Silver Lake, named for a small lake of the same name to the west of the highway and east of the community, as it approaches the village of New Berlin. Southeast of New Berlin, CR 18 intersects CR 13, a southeastward extension of New Berlin's South Main Street. While NY 8 directly enters the village, which is situated on the west bank of the river, CR 18 bypasses it to the east. The route crosses over Wharton Creek and intersects NY 80 in an area known as Hoboken before leaving the vicinity of New Berlin.

=== New Berlin to Bridgewater ===
North of New Berlin, CR 18 continues to follow a routing parallel to that of the Unadilla River and NY 8, which is joined by NY 80 in New Berlin. NY 80 splits off to the northwest just over 1 mile (1.6 km) later while NY 8 and CR 18 continue northward. The highways reenter a rural area, with forests and fields again surrounding the highways as CR 18 passes into the town of Edmeston. The county route enters the hamlet of South Edmeston, where it intersects with CR 20. CR 18 turns east here, overlapping CR 20 for approximately 1,000 feet (300 m) before leaving the route and turning back to the north.

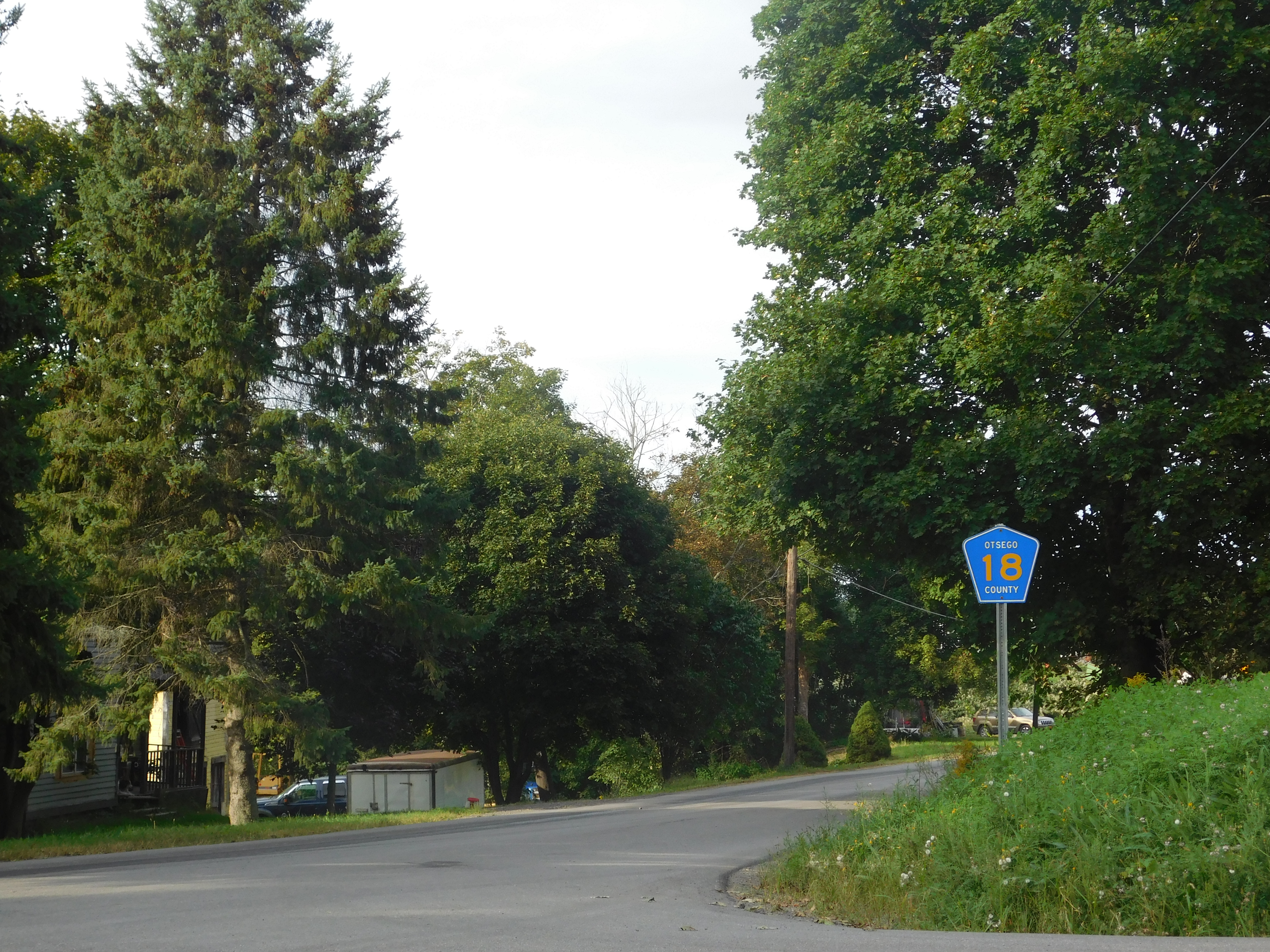
CR 18 north from CR 20 in South Edmeston

CR 18 continues on through the rural town, passing along the eastern base of the river valley as it intersects CR 18C (Welsh Road), a connector route linking CR 18 to the hamlet of West Edmeston and NY 8. From there, the route heads northeastward through open fields and isolated forests before crossing into the town of Plainfield. Here, CR 18 meets CR 19, an east–west highway connecting CR 18 to the community of Leonardsville. Roughly 2 miles (3.2 km) north of Leonardsville, CR 18 enters the small hamlet of Unadilla Forks. Here, it connects to its two other suffixed routes, both of which connect to county routes in adjacent counties.

As the name implies, Unadilla Forks is the location where the Unadilla River splits into two branches. Just north of its junction with CR 18A, CR 18 crosses over the Unadilla River's eastern branch. While the east branch heads off to the northeast, CR 18 follows the west branch northward through a low-lying area in the center of the Unadilla River valley composed mostly of open fields. The west branch of the river continues north into the village of Bridgewater, a community based around the junction of NY 8 and US 20; however, CR 18 bypasses the village to the east. CR 18 intersects US 20 east of the village before crossing into Oneida County and becoming that county's CR 2.

== History ==
New York State Route 413
- Location: Unadilla Forks–Plainfield
- Existed: c. 1931–early 1950s

The portion of CR 18 between CR 18A in Unadilla Forks and US 20 in Plainfield—a distance of 2.52 miles (4.06 km)—was originally a state-maintained highway. It was added to the New York state highway system on January 12, 1916, and designated as NY 413 c. 1931. The NY 413 designation was removed in the early 1950s.

In late 1932, the entire NY 413 was closed to traffic as part of a project to completely reconstruct the road. It was completed and reopened c. 1934.

Signage for county routes in Otsego County were posted in July 1965.

== Major intersections ==
The entire route is in Otsego County.

Location	mi	km	Destinations	Notes
Butternuts	0.00	0.00	NY 51	Southern terminus
South New Berlin	7.48	12.04	NY 23 (East Street)	
Pittsfield	15.67	25.22	NY 80 (Genesee Street)	
Plainfield	34.66	55.78	US 20	
Plainfield	34.83	56.05	CR 2 north (East Street)	Continuation into Oneida County
1.000 mi = 1.609 km; 1.000 km = 0.621 mi

== Suffixed routes ==
CR 18 has three suffixed routes that serve as connectors between CR 18 and county routes in adjacent counties.

- CR 18A connects CR 18 in Unadilla Forks to the Herkimer County line at Plainfield, where it becomes CR 162. It is the longest of CR 18's three suffixed routes.
- CR 18B links CR 18 in Unadilla Forks to the Madison County line just west of Unadilla Forks, where it becomes CR 84.
- CR 18C serves as a connector between CR 18 in Edmeston and the Madison County line at West Edmeston, where it becomes CR 94.
