= Winfield, New York =

Winfield, New York may refer to

- Winfield (town), New York
- West Winfield, New York
- Winfield, Queens, now eastern Woodside, Queens
