= Steele Creek (Mohawk River tributary) =

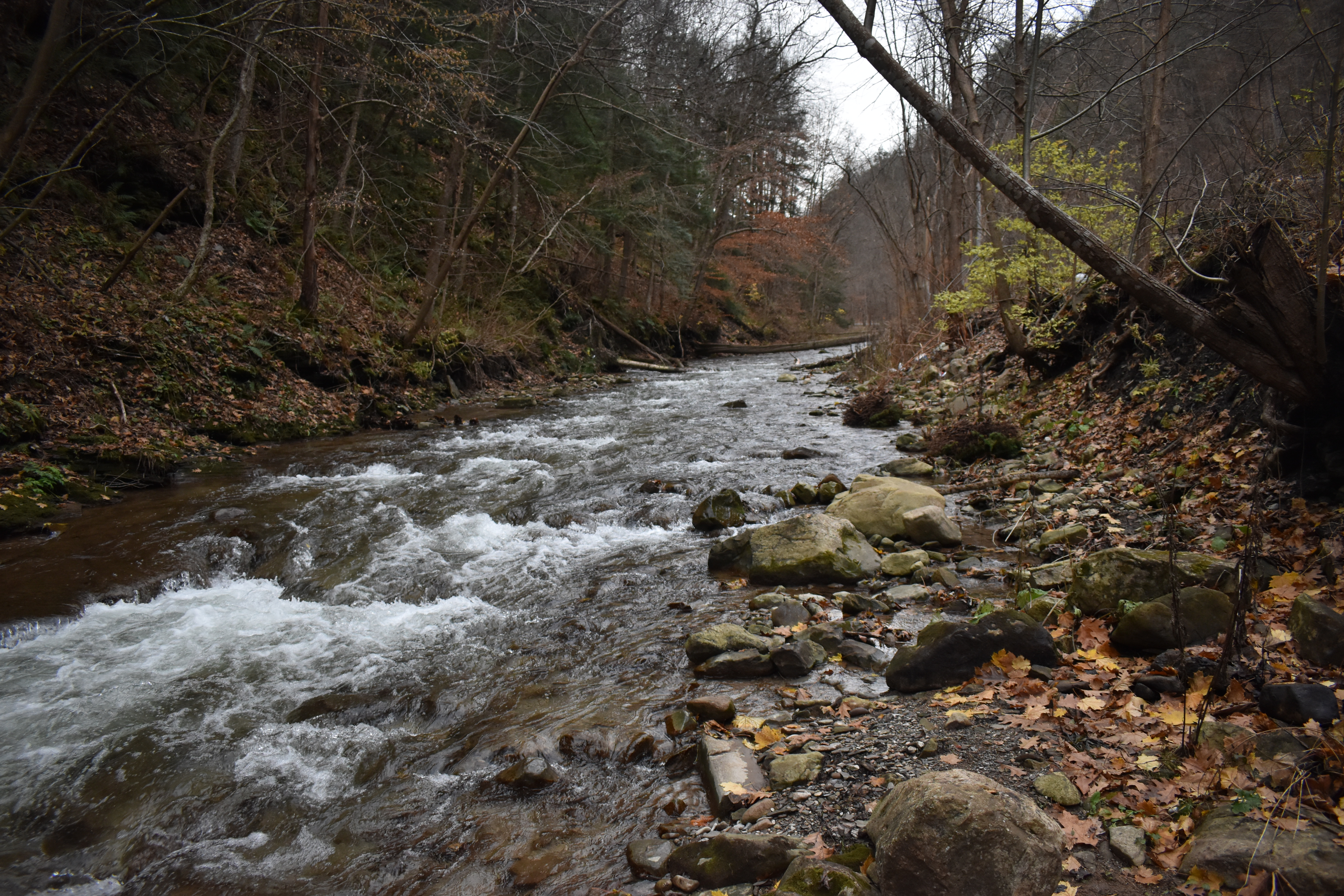
- Steele Creek along NY 51 by Ilion

- Location of the mouth of Steele Creek Steele Creek (Mohawk River tributary) (the United States)

Location
- Country: United States
- State: New York
- Region: Central New York
- County: Herkimer

Physical characteristics
- Source: Unnamed swamp
  - location: South of Cedarville
  - coordinates: 42°54′58″N 75°07′18″W
- Mouth: Mohawk River
  - location: Ilion
  - coordinates: 43°01′20″N 75°02′38″W
  - elevation: 384 ft (117 m)
- Basin size: 27.4 sq mi (71 km^{2})

Basin features
- Progression: Steele Creek → Mohawk River → Hudson River → Upper New York Bay

Steele Creek is a river in Herkimer County in the state of New York. The creek begins in an unnamed swamp south of Cedarville, and flows in a northeast direction before emptying into the Mohawk River in the village of Ilion. Steele Creek travels through the Ilion Gorge and alongside NY-51 for most of its length. Steele Creek derives its name from Rudolph Stahl (Staele, Staley, Steele), who built the first grist mill in Ilion along the creek.

== Hydrology ==
=== Discharge ===
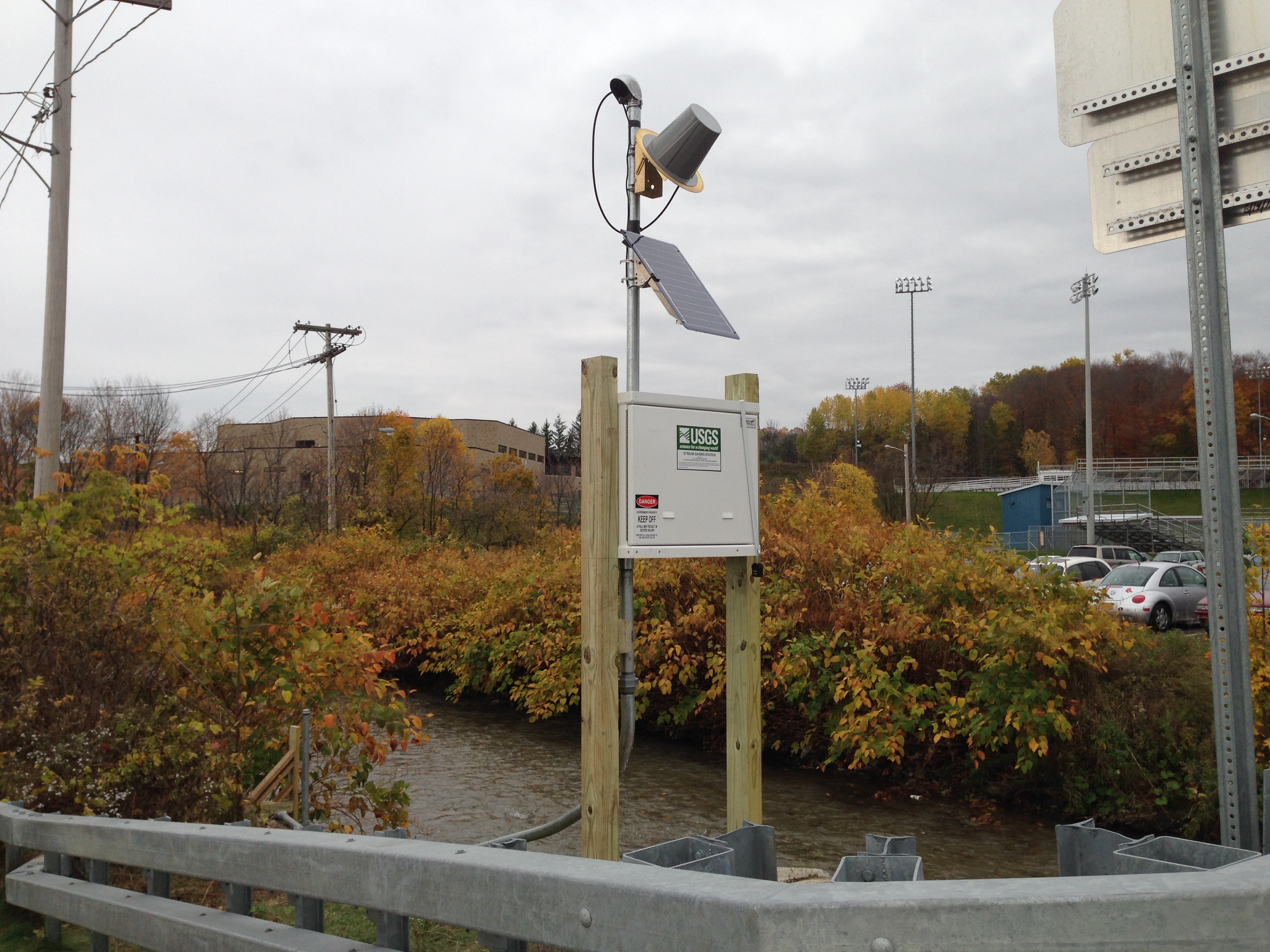
USGS stream gauge in Ilion

The United States Geological Survey (USGS) maintains a stream gauge on the creek 1.2 miles (1.9 km) upstream from the mouth in the Village of Ilion at the Frederick Street bridge. The station was in operation from November 1966 to September 1968 and then from October 2014 to now. It also took annual maximum measurements from 1964–1966, 1969, 1971–1983, 1985–1986, and 2000. The station had an estimated maximum discharge of 2,100 cubic feet (59 m^{3}) per second and a gauge height of 5.69 feet (1.73 m) on May 13, 2000. It had minimum discharge of 4.4 cubic feet (0.12 m^{3}) per second on August 7, 2018.

=== Flooding ===
On January 12, 2018, ice that broke loose by unseasonably high temperatures and rainfall caused ice jams in Steele Creek by Ilion which caused the water to crest over on Otsego Street (NY-51).

== History ==
- Rudolph Stahl built the first grist mill in Ilion on the Steele Creek, at about where the Ilion Episcopal Church sits today.
- Sam Newton built a cider mill in "Smokey Run", now known as South Ilion. He built a mill pond on the creek and powered the cider mill and vinegar works, a full blacksmith shop and a first floor wood working shop. Here the first 800 washing machines built in Central New York under a Mitchell Patent. A flood in 1938 took out the mill dam and the back end of the mill.
- Along Steele Creek sprang up other various mills. The Dexter oil mill and saw mill was about where Weber Avenue is now, the Ingersoll plaster mill and saw mill was near Philip Street, and a fulling mill was close to present Richfield Street.
