= South Ilion, New York =

- Census-designated place
- Location within New York Location within the United States
- Coordinates: 42°59′42″N 75°2′55″W
- Country: United States
- State: New York
- County: Herkimer
- Town: German Flatts

Area
  - Total: 0.44 sq mi (1.15 km^{2})
  - Land: 0.44 sq mi (1.14 km^{2})
  - Water: 0.0039 sq mi (0.01 km^{2})
- Elevation: 560 ft (170 m)

Population (2020)
  - Total: 119
  - Density: 270.9/sq mi (104.59/km^{2})
- Time zone: UTC-5 (Eastern (EST))
  - Summer (DST): UTC-4 (EDT)
- ZIP Code: 13357 (Ilion)
- Area codes: 315/680
- FIPS code: 36-69265
- GNIS feature ID: 2806942

South Ilion is a hamlet and census-designated place (CDP) in the town of German Flatts in Herkimer County, New York, United States. It was first listed as a CDP prior to the 2020 census. As of the 2020 census, South Ilion had a population of 119.

The community is in southwestern Herkimer County, in the southwestern part of German Flatts. The hamlet is in a narrow valley that leads upstream into Spinnerville Gulf and is 1.5 miles (2.4 km) south of the village of Ilion. New York State Route 51 runs through the northwestern side of the CDP, following the valley of Steele Creek. The highway leads north into Ilion and southwest 10 miles (16 km) to East Winfield.

== Demographics ==
Historical population
Census	Pop.	Note	%±
2020	119		—
U.S. Decennial Census
