= Amanda Jones (inventor) =

American author, inventor, and medium (1835–1914)

Amanda Theodosia Jones
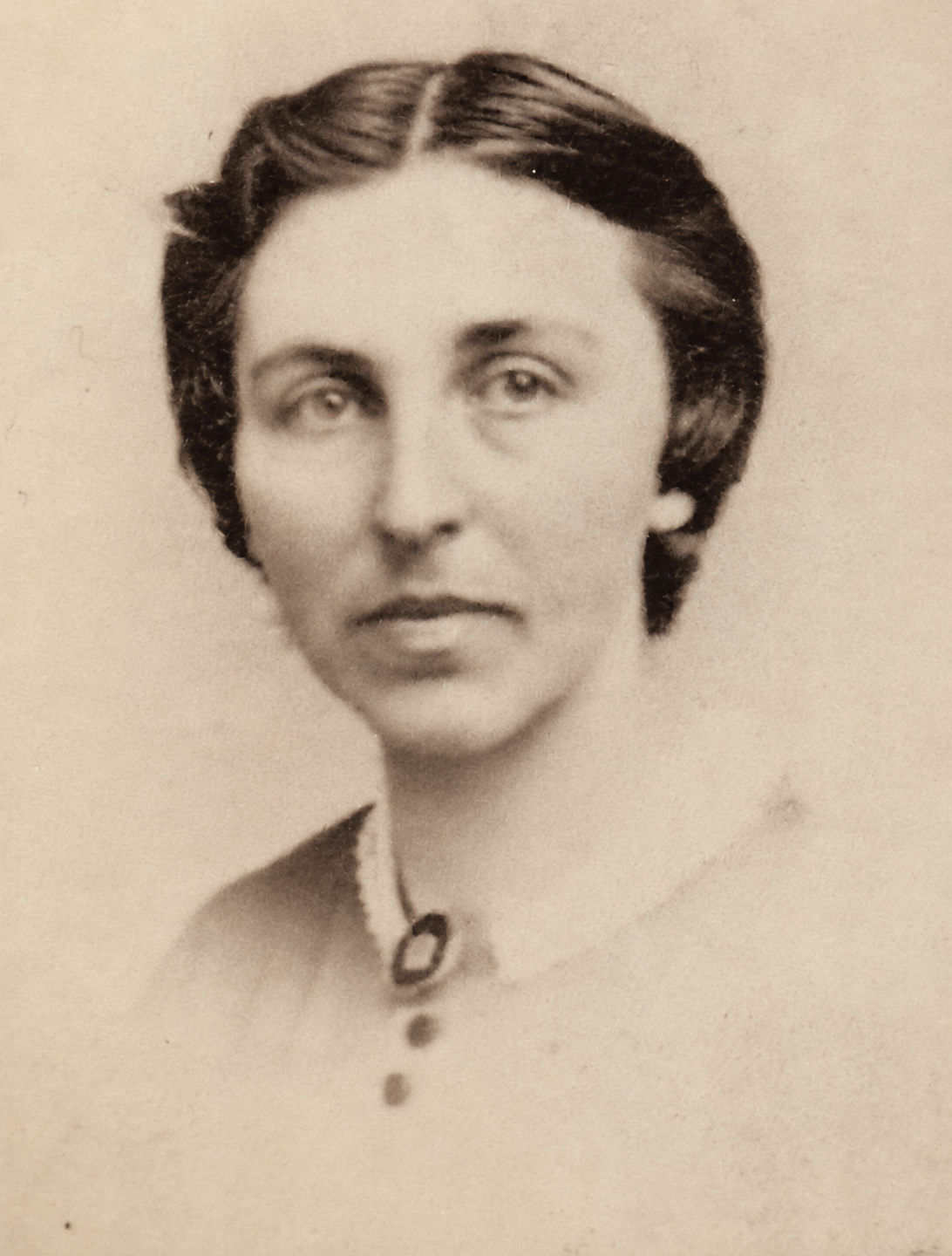
- Jones at age 35-36 (1870)
- Born: October 19, 1835; East Bloomfield, New York, US
- Died: March 31, 1914 (aged 78); Brooklyn, New York, US
- Resting place: Riverside Cemetery, Cleveland, Ohio, US
- Occupations: Inventor; Poet & author; Spiritualist

Signature
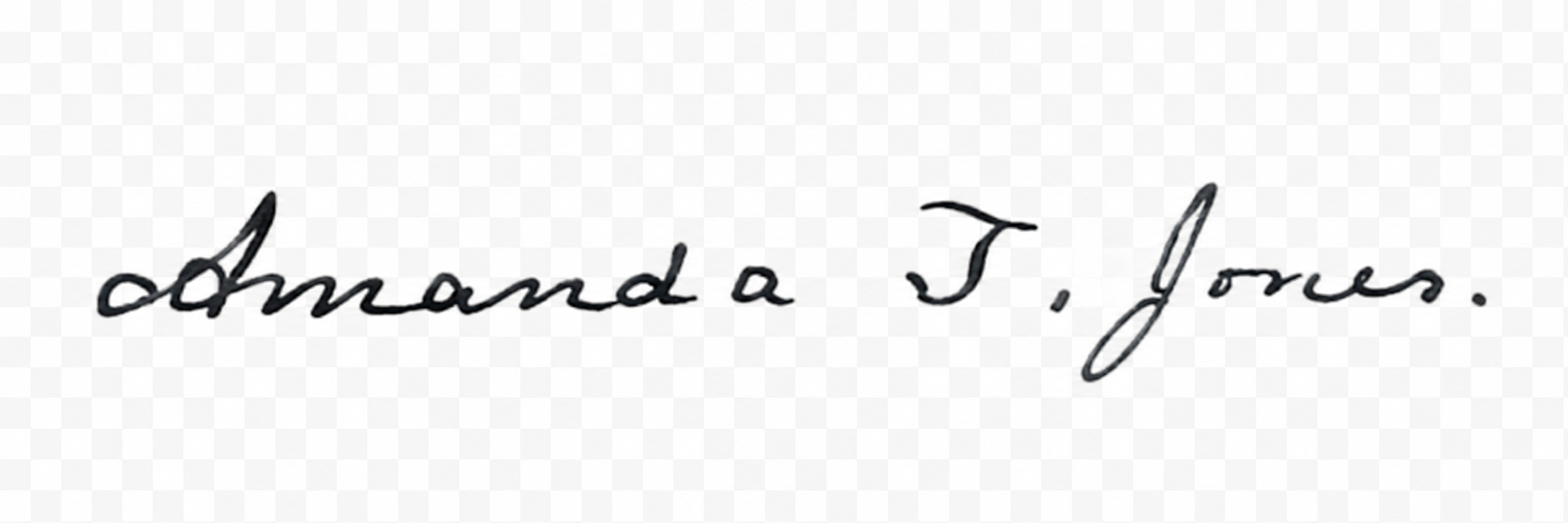

Amanda Theodosia Jones (October 19, 1835 – March 31, 1914) was an American inventor, poet, author, businesswoman, and Spiritualist. She is best known for developing the Jones Process, a vacuum method of canning devised in 1872 and covered by a series of patents the following year. The process preserved fruits and vegetables without extensive cooking and became the basis of the Woman's Canning and Preserving Company, which Jones founded in Chicago in 1890 as a business operated primarily by women. She also developed an oil burner, valves, and other mechanical devices, and later published technical writing on the use of liquid fuel.

Born in East Bloomfield, New York, Jones began teaching as a teenager and turned increasingly to writing after her first poem was published in 1854. Her early books included Ulah, and Other Poems (1861) and Poems (1867), and her work appeared in numerous periodicals. Poor health repeatedly interrupted her education and literary career. By the 1850s she embraced Spiritualism as her religion and considered herself a medium. Spiritual beliefs remained important throughout her life and influenced some of her personal and professional decisions, although Jones also explicitly asserted authorship of her patented inventions and described their development as her own work.

Jones moved to Chicago in 1869, where she worked as an editor before turning increasingly to invention and business. She later worked on oil-burning technology in Pennsylvania and became active in efforts to improve women's economic opportunities, including establishing a residence for working women and founding her women-run canning company. After leaving the company and Illinois in 1893, she settled in Junction City, Kansas, where she continued writing and experimenting with inventions. Her later works included several poetry collections, a series of engineering articles on liquid fuel, and the 1910 memoir A Psychic Autobiography. Late in life she moved to Brooklyn, New York, where she died in 1914 at the age of 78.

== Early life, education and health ==
Jones was born in East Bloomfield, New York, on October 19, 1835, the fourth of twelve children of Henry, whom Jones described as a master wool weaver, and Mary Alma (Mott) Jones. The 1893 biographical collection A Woman of the Century described Jones's ancestry as Puritan, Huguenot, Quaker, and Methodist, and said her forebears included patriots of the American Revolution. Jones described her family as deeply patriotic and credited her parents, especially her mother, with instilling patriotism in her. She wrote of her family being present at their Methodist church in New York during the advent of Millerism and the subsequent Great Disappointment.

Jones attended a local district school and later studied at the East Aurora Academy after her family moved to Black Rock, near Buffalo. Although the family had modest means, her parents placed a high priority on books on a level of religion, regarding them as "more necessary than daily bread". Her parents introduced her early to writers including Jane Austen, John Bunyan, John Dryden, Alexander Pope, and Walter Scott. Jones also read Charlotte Elizabeth Tonna, Robert Pollok, Richard Baxter, Fredrika Bremer, Maria Edgeworth, Eliza Cook, and especially favored Felicia Dorothea Hemans, writing of Hemans, "whose passion flowers of poesy are unwithering." Jones's imagination was influenced by her mother's musical repertoire and what Notable American Women called her "unusual conversational ability". She was thirteen when her brother, two years older, died of heart disease at school in her presence. She began teaching at the age of fifteen in 1849. Jones graduated from East Aurora Academy in 1850.

At seventeen, Jones experienced what was described as a "physical breakdown" and was largely incapacitated for six years. Having already been a sickly child, Jones contracted tuberculosis in 1859 and spent the next year and a half convalescing, first at the Clifton Springs Water Cure and then in northern Michigan. At Clifton Springs, Jones met Jane W. Kendall of Providence, Rhode Island, the sister of manufacturer Henry L. Kendall, who became a lifelong friend and supporter. Jones continued to suffer from poor health throughout her life and sought treatment at spas, where therapies included mineral cures and compressed-air baths; she spent the rest of her life regularly in search of treatments for her illnesses. Altman noted that some have interpreted the illness as clinical depression associated with the death of her brother Lester, while Jones's autobiographical description of her symptoms may instead suggest chronic tuberculosis.

After attending the East Aurora Academy, Jones began teaching at a country school at fifteen and studied during the summers at Buffalo High School, which was detrimental to her health. For six years Jones was hindered by "physical depression and distress, which had culminated in such an excessive weakness of the lungs", and she believed she only began to recover around the time of the publication of Ulah, and Other Poems, in 1861. Her health never fully recovered.

== Religion and spiritualism ==
Jones was raised in a Methodist household, where she was taught to regard what Notable American Women described as the "religio-astronomical" writings of Thomas Dick as "almost biblical". Jones's conversion coincided with the emergence of the American Spiritualism movement in neighboring Wayne County beginning in 1848; by 1854 she was convinced that she was a medium. Jones identified herself to family as a "writing medium". The sudden death of her brother Lester occurred during this period of their childhood and contributed to her search for spiritual consolation. Jones believed her brother's death had been prophesied by a dream two years prior. She believed in telepathy and wrote extensively of it, but did not believe she herself was telepathic.

After meeting a practicing spiritualist family friend as a child, Jones became convinced she had to choose to believe in either spiritualism or the Christian faith she was raised in, but later came to believe they were not mutually exclusive and were compatible. Within her autobiography, Jones implied Christianity was a "mere instrument" for spiritualism. Jones was not a part of any traveling or organized spiritualist lecture circuits and programs. Her religious and spiritual views helped Jones remain for extended periods with friends sharing similar beliefs, often on farms where she found the quiet surroundings favorable to writing poetry. Jones's early communal Spiritualist life differed from her later practices, which became more solitary as invention and business increasingly occupied her time.

Jones recalled that in 1854, as the family gathered during her father's final illness, she revealed her mediumship and Spiritualist beliefs to her mother and was initially met with "evident contempt". By 1855 her mother, while refusing to become a spiritualist herself, came to believe Jones's mediumship was genuine after testing it with unspoken questions. Jones was dismissive of unconscious trance mediumship, referring to its practitioners as "sleeping mediums"; she described her own temporary assumption of another personality as "personating" and said she remained aware that she herself had not been displaced. She believed that organized clergy claimed sole direct access to spiritual guidance for reasons related to "social control". Jones was not known to have practiced her spiritualist religion before large public audiences.

== Poetry to the Civil War ==
Jones left teaching in 1854 after the Ladies' Repository of Cincinnati accepted the first of a series of poems she would contribute to the magazine over the following decade. In 1861, Jones published Ulah, and Other Poems; her second poetry collection, Poems, followed in 1867. Afterward, she spent much of 1861 to 1868 living in Cattaraugus County in New York.

The publication of Poems in 1867 left Jones near collapse, and she spent much of 1868–1869 recuperating from tuberculosis, partly at her widowed mother's home in southern Wisconsin. During this period, Jones stayed with farming families in rural areas west of Buffalo and at health spas; Lowry wrote that she appears to have stayed at some spas without charge while providing religious medium services to other guests. She spent time during this period in the areas of Oil City and Titusville, Pennsylvania.

In her poem "Forest Lawn", Jones memorialized her brother Porter Jones, a private in the 2nd New York Mounted Rifles who died in 1864 at age eighteen. Jones wrote Flowers and a Weed for a state session of the Kansas State Social Science Federation in Junction City.

=== Abigail Becker ===
A Heroine of '54 concerned Abigail Becker and her rescue of sailors near Long Point, Ontario; the poem appeared in the 1886 The Ontario High School Reader. (Note: Calvert's 1899 version of the poem was presented as a "corrected form", stating that Jones had been wrongly informed on one point and that Becker, then Mrs. Rohrer, requested that verse thirteen be omitted. Jones's version in The Ontario High School Reader described the mate entering the water followed by the captain, with the two later sinking together; Calvert's version instead introduced Becker's crippled stepson, who entered the water to assist and was swept away with the mate. The omitted thirteenth stanza began "Get wood, cook fish, make ready all" and described Becker fleeing in a cotton gown and tattered shawl, barefoot.)

Sped Mother Becker, 'Children, wake;
A ship's gone down, they're needing me;
Your father's off on shore; the lake
Is just a raging sea'

She sought the men, she sought them far,
Three fathoms down she gripped them tight,
With both together up the bar
She staggered into sight.

=== War poems ===
During the Civil War, Jones wrote war songs that achieved a broad circulation, published in Frank Leslie's Illustrated Newspaper. Of Jones' Civil War poetry, most "glorify the Northern cause", according to academic Lisa Mainiero. Despite her writing of patriotic poems and war songs to support the North and the Union, Jones opposed war. Lowry also identified A Soldier's Mother as an antiwar poem reflecting Jones's response to the Civil War's death toll. Altman identified The Prophecy of the Dead as an example of the antiwar strain in Jones's Civil War poetry:

When the foes of the nation have pressed
To its lips the sponge reeking in gall,
When the spear has gone into the breasts

And the skies have been rent by its call,
It shall rise from its rest;
It shall rise and shall rule over all.

Jones was named an honorary member of the Buffalo Young Men's Association in 1862; she was the first woman so honored. Some of her poems appeared in Scribner's Magazine while others were published in the Century Magazine, Our Continent, and other journals. A Prairie Idyl reflected Jones's detailed knowledge of Midwestern United States wildflowers, while her later Kansas Bird Songs demonstrated similar familiarity with birdlife.

Reviewing Jones's Poems in 1867, Henry James criticized her verse as verbose and rhetorical rather than lyrical, while conceding that it was "decidedly spirited". He remarked on her frequent use of violent analogies and metaphors, singling out her description of the "cry of the whippoorwill" as "taxing the sense with a dulcitude fearfully keen." Author Linda Jacobs Altman described Jones' poetry as "abstract and otherworldly", with a "touch of Victorian moralizing". Poor health kept Jones from sustained literary work for several years after her Civil War poetry appeared in book form. She additionally taught music to make ends meet during this period.

== Chicago and vacuum canning ==
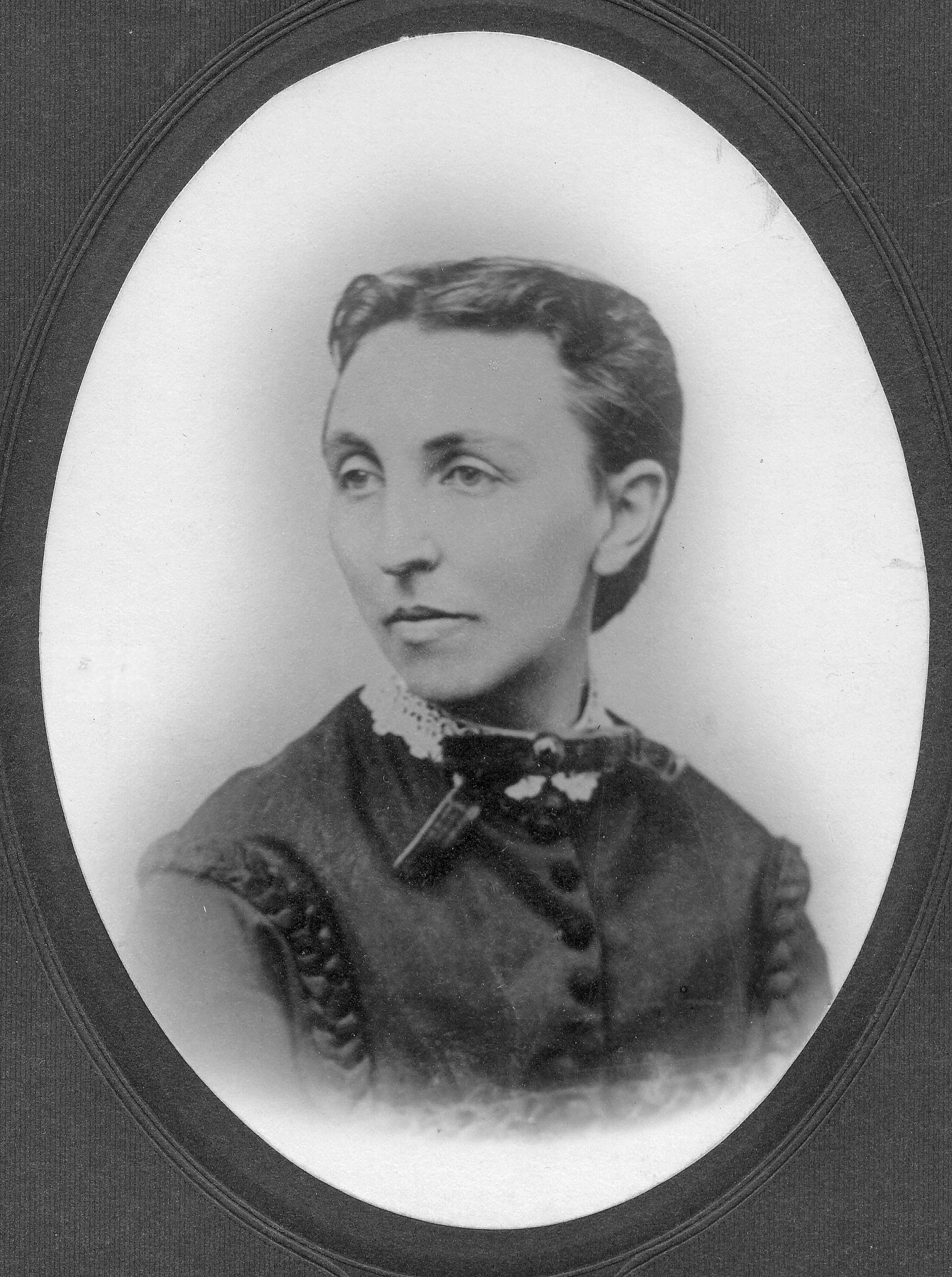
Jones in 1872.

In her autobiography, Jones wrote that her 1869 move to the Midwest followed instructions from a spirit she identified as "Dr. Jonathan Andrews", a figure who said he had been known in Boston and told her, "You will be wanted in Chicago." After arriving in Chicago, Jones sought employment as a literary editor and began a new career. Her Chicago periodical work included serving as associate editor of Universe in 1869, later working with Western Rural, and becoming editor of the juvenile weekly Bright Side in 1870. She also contributed to publications including Interior, Scribner's, Century, Outlook, and The Youth's Companion. In 1872, Jones conceived the idea that led to her vacuum canning process for preserving food. According to Jones, the idea occurred to her after she dozed during an air bath; she had no previous experience with canning. Jones was never formally educated or trained in engineering disciplines or the sciences related to her inventions.

I see how fruit can be canned without cooking it. The air must be exhausted from the cells and fluid made to take its place. The fluid must be airless also — a light syrup of sugar and water — that, or the juice of fruit.

Jones credited Jane Kendall with urging her to test the idea and introduce it to Henry Kendall, who subsequently provided financial support for her early experiments. Jones contacted the scientist Leroy C. Cooley of Albany, whom varying accounts described as either her cousin or a relative by marriage. Cooley agreed to help develop the process, although Jones's "ardent" spiritualist beliefs made him uneasy. Jones later wrote that she believed "spirits had elected him" in regard to Cooley, whom she described as an "investigator, chemist, physicist" and professor. Jones and Cooley continued refining the process through correspondence, and in one laboratory trial grapes split apart as air escaped from them before the flasks were sealed and left for testing.

Canning had been practiced since the early 19th century, but its microbiological basis remained poorly understood. Existing methods required extensive cooking, which diminished the food's flavor and texture; Altman also noted the resulting loss of nutritional value. Nicolas Francois Appert's 1810 process required food to be sealed in containers and boiled for several hours, while Peter Durand adapted it to tin-plated iron cans that were supplied to the Royal Navy by 1813. Canning reached the United States by 1819 and expanded into mass production during the Civil War, although early cans were cumbersome and had to be opened with a chisel and hammer.

The Jones Process, also called the Pure Food Vacuum Preserving Process, involved placing fresh food in a container, withdrawing the air through valves, adding hot liquid at about 100–120 °F, and immediately sealing the jar. Under the reduced pressure, the liquid boiled at a comparatively low temperature, expelling air from the food's cells without cooking it. After repeated trials, an early test batch prepared with the process remained preserved for more than five weeks. The process was intended to preserve fresh fruits and vegetables without the extensive cooking required by earlier methods. Jones operated canning plants in multiple states and promoted the company's products through national magazine advertising. Five patents associated with the process were issued in 1873: two to Jones alone, one jointly to Jones and Cooley, and two to Cooley alone, one of which he assigned to Jones.

== Oil industry and return to writing ==
Jones developed another invention, an oil burner, which according to her was based on the advice of spirits. A Pennsylvania oil producer asked Jones to devise a safer means of burning crude oil; after studying the problem in western Pennsylvania, she developed a valve to regulate the flow of fuel and patented her Safety Burner in 1880. The design attracted interest from the U.S. Navy, but a planned manufacturing venture collapsed after its financier lost his fortune, and the burner never entered production. By 1882, Jones had shifted her attention back to writing and published A Prairie Idyl. In the same year, Jones served as president of the Women's Protective and Reform Association of Bradford, Pennsylvania, which was incorporated to aid women "seeking a virtuous livelihood". Jones established a residence for working women in Bradford.

== Woman's Canning and Preserving Company ==
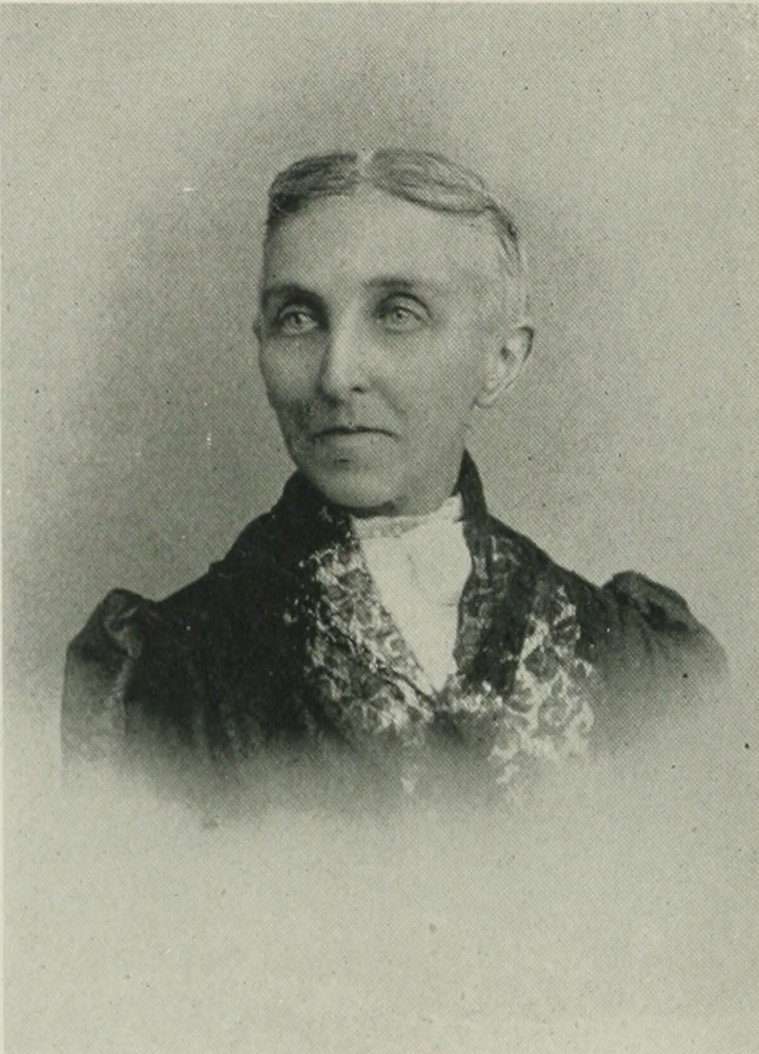
Jones was listed in 1893's A Woman of the Century.

Later in life, Jones became a supporter of women's rights and suffrage. She founded the Woman's Canning and Preserving Company in Chicago in 1890 as a business intended to be owned and operated primarily by women. Denise E. Pilato, writing in The Retrieval of a Legacy: Nineteenth-Century American Women Inventors, compared Jones's goals with those of Charlotte Smith, a contemporary of hers from upstate New York who lobbied for improvements in women's working conditions. In an address to her employees, Jones said that,

This is to be a woman's industry. No man will vote our stock, transact our business, keep our books, pronounce on women's wages, supervise our factories. Give men whatever work is suitable, but keep the governing power. This is a business training school for working women—you with all the rest. Here is a mission; let it be fulfilled.

Canning facilities under the company were opened in Aurora, Illinois and Montello, Wisconsin. Within three months of opening, a New York City wholesaler placed an order for 24,000 cases. The company provided women with training intended to increase their economic independence. Jones was noted for her political actions, including campaigning for impoverished women's rights and social equality. By February 1892, Jones was the company's vice-president and general manager; the Chicago Daily News reported that nearly $200,000 of its stock had been sold, that stock ownership was restricted to women, that it reportedly had stockholders in every state, and that it employed only one man, its factory manager, while expanding its facilities to employ another seventy-five women. The 1893 volume A Woman of the Century by Charles Wells Moulton, Frances Willard, and Mary Livermore listed Jones as among the most important women of the 19th century.

The same year, following a dispute with other officers, Jones left the company and moved to Junction City, Kansas, where her sisters lived. A July 1892 report in The Inter Ocean gave a less favorable account of the dispute, alleging that Jones had installed two relatives in company offices, said to hold sinecures; according to the newspaper, the directors subsequently removed Jones, her relatives, and her preserving process from the company.

The company's early success led its other executives and stockholders to seek greater returns. The company president proposed admitting male investors who would contribute $80,000 and manage the business in exchange for half its profits. Jones reluctantly agreed to the arrangement. The company, due to the dilution of women controlling it, Altman wrote, changed the nature of the company from being woman-focused and was followed by aggressive efforts to sell its stock. Within three years, Jones was forced from the company's management and later sold her interest in the business. The Woman's Canning and Preserving Company remained in operation until 1921, when it was forcibly dissolved.

== Later engineering and poetry ==
Jones was recognized as a scientist during her time. In Junction City, Jones continued both her literary work and her experiments with inventions. Following the invention of the Jones Preserving Process and the sale of the Woman's Canning and Preserving Company, Jones continued inventing, working on an oil burner, several types of valves, and the Ready-Opener Tin Can. Jones received four additional patents between 1903 and 1906 for developments related to her preserving process, followed by three patents in 1904, 1912, and 1914 concerning valves and other refinements to her oil burner. Her device would see usage in boilers and oil fields of the time. The design attracted interest from the U.S. Navy but never entered any military production.

Lessons from the Spanish–American War led the U.S. Navy to begin replacing coal with fuel oil in its warships. In 1904 the board published its findings from comparative trials of coal and liquid fuel for naval use. The magazines Engineer and Steam Engineering published the oil burner engineering and science research that Jones had conducted. Jones's technical review appeared in four parts in The Engineer in 1904 and 1905. Her obituary reported that an engineering magazine paid her "liberally" for a technical article on engineering matters. She was listed in Who's Who in America and in Woman's Who's Who of America for 1914–15.

Jones continued to publish literary works into the turn of the 20th century, including Flowers and a Weed (1899), Rubáiyát of Solomon, and Other Poems (1905), Poems 1854-1906 (1906), A Mother of Pioneers (1908), and her final volume, A Psychic Autobiography (1910).

== A Psychic Autobiography ==
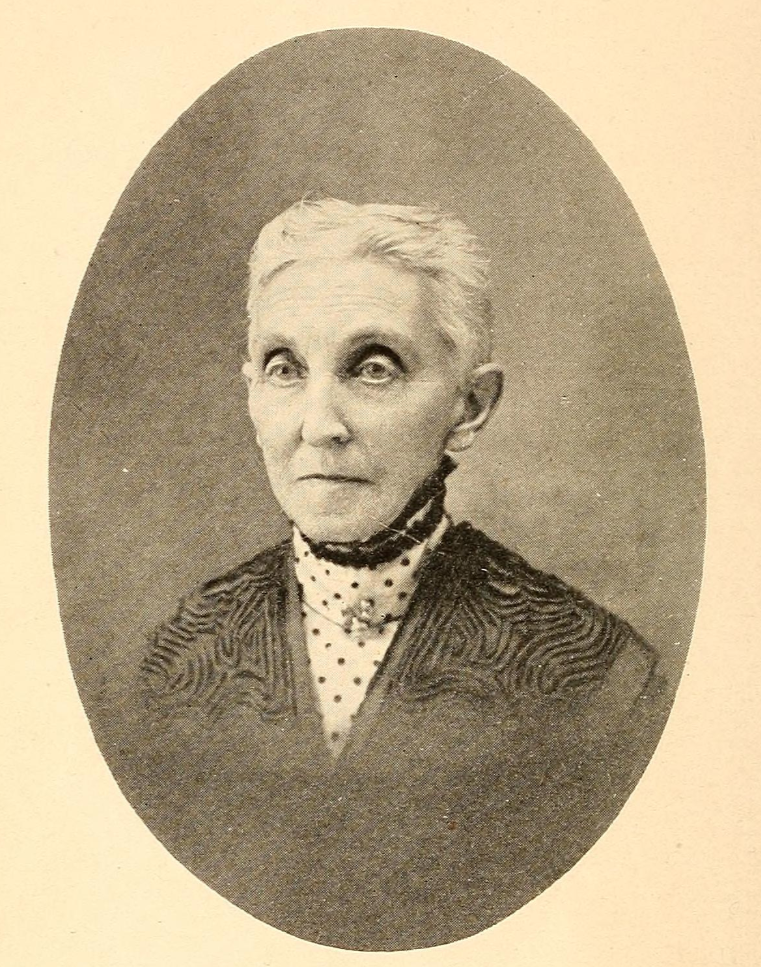
Portrait in her 1910 book, A Psychic Autobiography.

In 1910, she published A Psychic Autobiography, which focused on her interest in spiritualism. A London edition of A Psychic Autobiography followed its New York publication in 1911. In Invisible Hosts: Performing the Nineteenth-Century Spirit Medium's Autobiography, Elizabeth Lowry identified A Psychic Autobiography as one of only four book-length Spiritualist autobiographies written between 1885-1910 examined in her study. The others were written by Leah Fox Underhill of the Fox sisters of Rochester, New York, who originated modern American spiritualism in 1848; Nettie Coburn Maynard, who claimed ties to Abraham Lincoln; and Emma Hardinge Britten, who wrote volumes detailing the American spiritual movement and also had ties to Lincoln's campaign in the 1860 United States presidential election, as well as Mary Todd Lincoln.

Jones presented the memoir partly as repayment for what she believed she owed to the spirits who had assisted her. Lowry wrote of a broader pattern of women autobiographers who presented publication as something undertaken at the urging of others rather than solely on their own initiative, as Jones did. This was the norm at the time, according to Lowry, particularly for published works dealing with unconventional subjects. She dedicated A Psychic Autobiography to William James, crediting him with having proposed that she publish an account of her supernatural experiences. The book included an introduction by James H. Hyslop, then secretary of the American Society for Psychical Research. Lowry interpreted Hyslop's preface as an effort to establish Jones's credibility by emphasizing her accomplishments as a poet and scientist.

Jones described herself in A Psychic Autobiography as a "writing medium", and wrote that she believed her actions were governed by a spiritual guardian. Jones described two recurring advisors, Dr. Jonathan Andrews and Judge Evelyn, as spirits whom she said communicated with and advised her. Lowry writes that Jones's autobiography describes the doctors Andrews and Hudson as spirit figures through whom Jones connected her mediumship with her professional work, including the canning project and some business decisions. Lowry wrote that some women inventors of the era invoked male spiritual inspiration amid gender prejudice, and interpreted Jones's emphasis on male helpers such as Dr. Andrews and Dr. Cooley as lending her scientific credibility while preserving her own claim to authorship. Lowry interpreted Jones's Spiritualist self-presentation as helping make her entry into the then male-dominated fields of business, law, and science more acceptable to contemporary readers.

Jones described spirit guidance as advisory rather than coercive, maintaining that recipients remained responsible for deciding whether to act on it. This emphasis on personal responsibility contrasted with a common defense among women mediums, who attributed public speaking to involuntary spirit control rather than to their own choice. She explicitly distinguished religious and spiritual inspiration from legal authorship and business, stating that her patented devices were her own work for her protection; she had personally sworn to each patent application as the inventor. Jones wrote of her beliefs that Biblical figures were actually practicing spiritualism. She believed that the spirits humans were in contact with delivered communications from God, in order to advance scientific progress.

Lowry read the memoir as Jones's attempt to present her varied work as a writer, inventor, and businesswoman as expressions of a unified Spiritualist religious belief system. Jones wrote of her inspirations for inventions in spiritual and religious terms, describing some as a "gold blossom dropped beside me" to be picked up. The "gold blossom" metaphor for the canning idea as a model of invention in which an externally inspired idea was delivered, Lowry wrote, still depended upon the inventor recognizing and acting upon it. Lowry noted that A Psychic Autobiography and Jones's works were rich in didacticism, and that she attempted in her autobiography to demonstrate spiritualism in "both theoretical and practical perspectives". The Spiritualist journal Light gave A Psychic Autobiography a favorable notice in 1911, calling it a "very alive book" and emphasizing Jones's varied career, and singled it out again in its 1912 year-end survey for its treatment of her spiritual experiences. Lowry described A Psychic Autobiography as digressive and sometimes difficult to follow, particularly where Jones shifts among memoir, poetry, dreams, and discussions of Spiritualist doctrine. The memoir avoids discussion of suffrage and women's rights despite her political interests. Lowry interpreted the omission as a strategy for navigating contemporary expectations that discouraged women from expressing political opinions publicly.

== Later life, death and burial ==
Jones never married, and described marriage as a "perilous adventure". Despite remaining unmarried, Jones maintained an active family life through her many siblings. She dedicated her 1882 collection A Prairie Idyl, and Other Poems to Jane Kendall, and wrote of their relationship in her 1910 autobiography: "We had begun to love each other in 1859, at Clifton Water Cure. We never stopped; and I suppose, throughout eternity, we two shall call across as many worlds as Heaven may interpose, and answer each to each."

Jones later made her home in Junction City, Kansas, living with her sister Mrs. C.H. Manley. Several of Jones's literary works were associated with her years in Junction City, including Kansas Bird Songs, Fort Riley, and Flowers and a Weed. After living in Junction City for about twenty years, Jones moved east to pursue business matters connected with her patents. Late in her life, she moved to Brooklyn, New York, to pursue business interests.

Jones died in her Brooklyn apartment in 1914, aged 78; Notable American Women gave the cause as influenza, while her Junction City obituary reported an attack of pneumonia. The Brooklyn Eagle, in Jones's 1914 obituary, reported that she had given "several small fortunes" derived from her inventions to assist women in need. A 1914 biographical directory listed Jones as a Republican. She was buried at Riverside Cemetery in Cleveland, Ohio, in the plot of her brother, William Collins Jones.

== Works ==
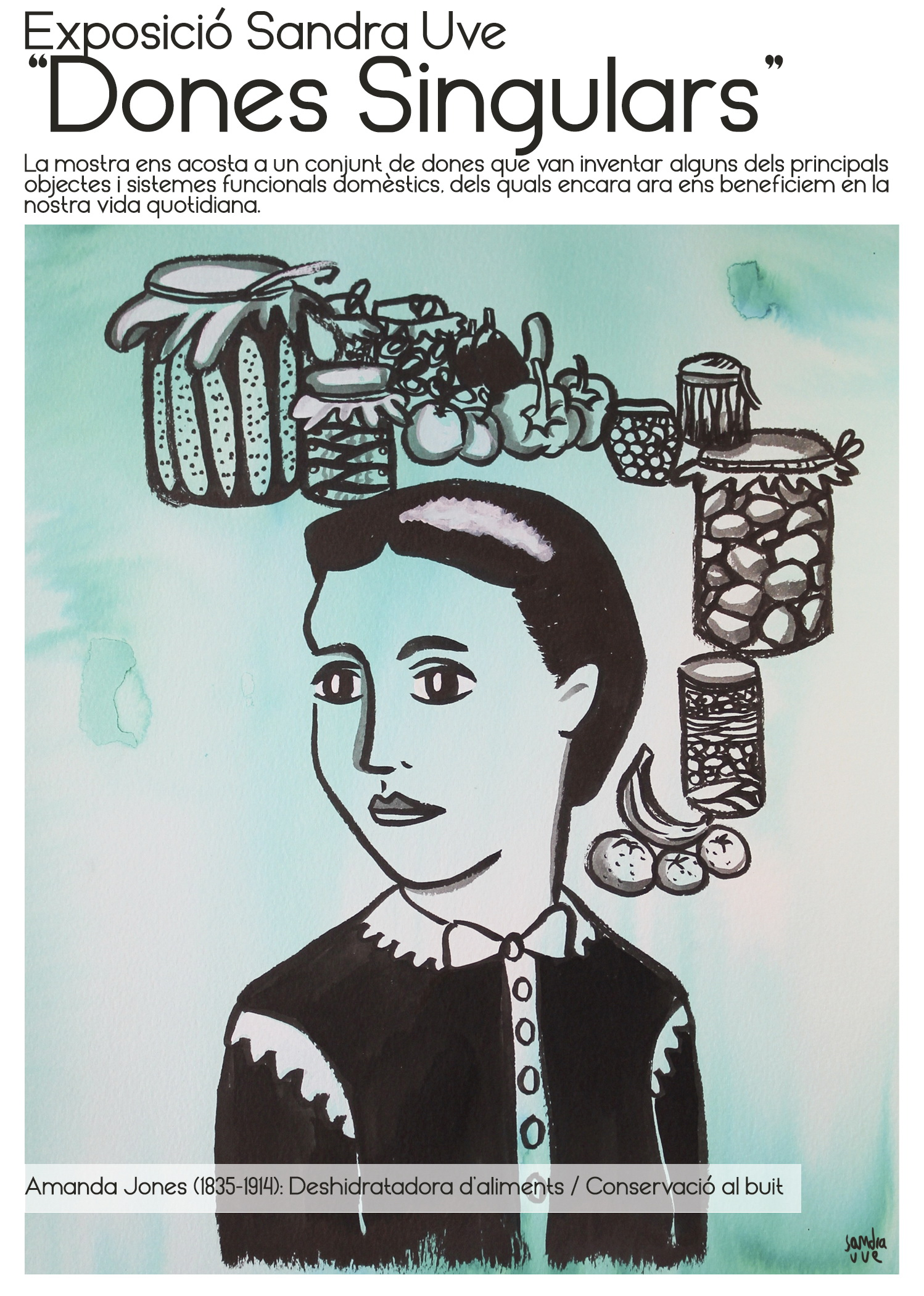
Jones as illustrated by Sandra Uve for the 2021 exhibition Dones singulars ("Remarkable Women") at the Institut d'Estudis Catalans in Barcelona.

=== Books ===
- Jones, Amanda T. (1861). Ulah, and Other Poems. Buffalo: H. H. Otis.
- Jones, Amanda T. (1867). Poems. New York: Hurd and Houghton.
- Jones, Amanda T. (1882). A Prairie Idyl, and Other Poems. Chicago: Jansen, McClurg & Company.
- Jones, Amanda T. (1899). Flowers and a Weed.
- Jones, Amanda T. (1905). Rubáiyát of Solomon, and Other Poems. New York: Alden Brothers.
- Jones, Amanda T. (1906). Poems, 1854–1906. New York: Alden Brothers.
- Jones, Amanda T. (1908). A Mother of Pioneers.
- Jones, Amanda T. (1910). A Psychic Autobiography. Introduction by James H. Hyslop. New York: Greaves Publishing Company.

=== Engineering articles ===
- Jones, Amanda T. (1904). "The Liquid Fuel Problem. Part I". The Engineer. Vol. 41. pp. 821–822.
- Jones, Amanda T. (1904). "The Liquid Fuel Problem. Part II". The Engineer. Vol. 41. pp. 855–856.
- Jones, Amanda T. (1905). "The Liquid Fuel Problem. Part III". The Engineer. Vol. 42. pp. 90–91.
- Jones, Amanda T. (1905). "The Liquid Fuel Problem. Part IV". The Engineer. Vol. 42. pp. 108–109.

=== Inventions and patents ===
Jones invented the Ready-Opener Tin Can. The five patents associated with the Jones Process included two issued to Jones as sole inventor.

- US 139580 Amanda T. Jones, "Improvement in fruit-jars", issued June 3, 1873.
- US 139581 Amanda T. Jones and Le Roy C. Cooley, "Improvement in preserving fruit, vegetables, &c.", issued June 3, 1873.
- US 140508 Amanda T. Jones, "Improvement in fruit-jars", issued July 1, 1873.
- US 225839 Amanda T. Jones, "Oil-burner", issued March 23, 1880.
- US 1039752A Amanda T. Jones, "Method and apparatus for burning fuel-oil", issued October 1, 1912.
- US 1114769A Amanda T. Jones, "Liquid-fuel furnace", issued October 27, 1914.

== See also ==
- Josephine Cochrane – American inventor (1839–1913)
- Mary Anderson – American inventor (1866–1953)
- Ruth Graves Wakefield – American chef and inventor (1903–1977)
- Grace Hopper – U.S. naval officer and computer scientist (1906–1992)
- Hedy Lamarr – Austrian-American actress and inventor (1914–2000)
