= Cedarville, New York =

- Hamlet
- Location within New York Location within the United States
- Coordinates: 42°55′50″N 75°06′46″W
- Country: United States
- State: New York
- County: Herkimer
- Town: Columbia
- Elevation: 1,217 ft (371 m)
- Time zone: UTC-5 (Eastern (EST))
  - Summer (DST): UTC-4 (EDT)
- Area codes: 315/680

Cedarville is a hamlet located on NY 51 in the Town of Columbia in Herkimer County, New York, United States. Steele Creek flows northward through the hamlet.
