= Meetinghouse Green Road Cemetery =

Historic cemetery in New York, United States

- U.S. National Register of Historic Places
- Location within New York Location within the United States
- Location: Cross and Meeting House Rds., Meetinghouse Green, New York
- Coordinates: 42°55′08″N 75°09′50″W
- Area: 1.3 acres (0.53 ha)
- Built: c. 1801
- NRHP reference No.: 13000357
- Added to NRHP: June 5, 2013

Meetinghouse Green Road Cemetery is a historic cemetery located at Meetinghouse Green in Herkimer County, New York. It was established about 1801 and contains about 140 marked burials. The most recent burial dates to 1967. Headstones include simple grave markers through large and ornate carved and cast monuments.

It was listed on the National Register of Historic Places in 2013.
