= Brace Farm =

- U.S. National Register of Historic Places
- Location within New York Location within the United States
- Nearest city: 428 Brace Rd., Meetinghouse Green, New York
- Coordinates: 42°55′50″N 75°10′04″W
- Area: 205 acres (83 ha)
- Built: c. 1810, 1861, c. 1870
- Architectural style: Italianate
- NRHP reference No.: 13000356
- Added to NRHP: June 5, 2013

Brace Farm, also known as Pleasant Hill Stock Farm, is a historic home and farm located at Meetinghouse Green in Herkimer County, New York. The Brace farmhouse was built in 1861, and consists of a two-story, three-bay, main block and 1 1/2-story rear ell with Italianate style design elements. The frame dwelling has a low-pitched hipped roof topped by a cupola, overhanging bracketed eaves, and a one-story front porch with decorative scrollwork. Also on the property are a contributing carriage house (c. 1870) and massive dairy barn complex (c. 1810 with multiple additions).

It was listed on the National Register of Historic Places in 2013.
