= New York State Route 187 =

State highway in Erie County, New York, US

New York State Route 187
- Transit Road
- Map of the Buffalo area with NY 187 highlighted in red

Route information
- Maintained by NYSDOT
- Length: 3.09 mi (4.97 km)
- Existed: early 1940s–present

Major junctions
- South end: US 20A in Orchard Park
- North end: US 20 in Elma

Location
- Country: United States
- State: New York
- Counties: Erie

Highway system
- New York Highways; Interstate; US; State; Reference; Parkways
← NY 186	→ NY 189

New York State Route 187 (NY 187) is a short state highway located entirely in Erie County, New York, in the United States. It serves as the southern end of the busy Transit Road in the town of Elma. Its southern terminus is at Quaker Road (U.S. Route 20A or US 20A) and its northern terminus at US 20 where that highway becomes Transit Road. Unlike much of the rest of Transit, which is mostly designated as part of NY 78, the NY 187 portion is lightly trafficked, two-lane and largely undeveloped. NY 187 was assigned in the early 1940s and was previously part of NY 78.

== Route description ==
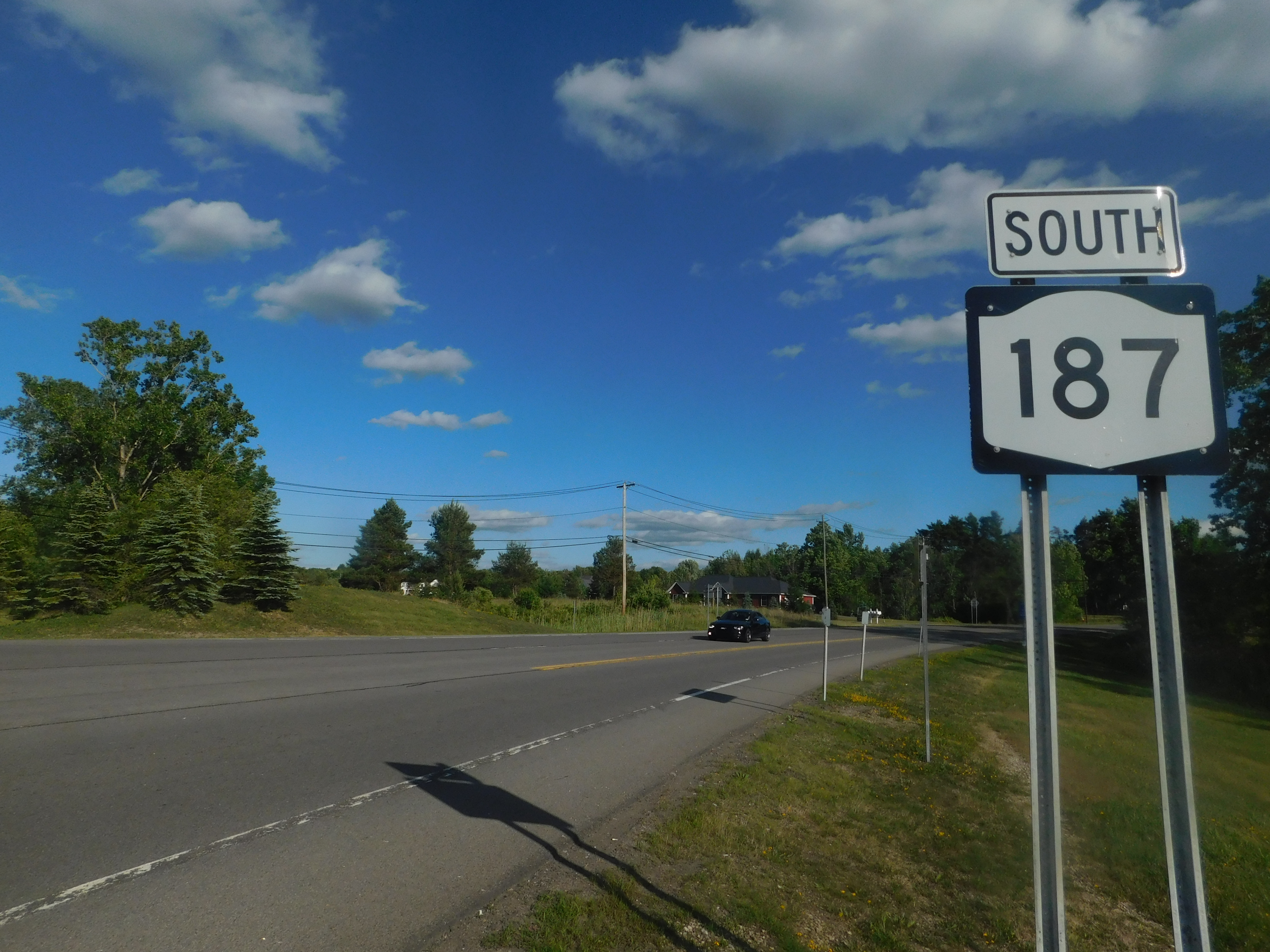
NY 187 from the intersection with US 20 in Elma

NY 187 begins at an intersection with US 20A (Quaker Road) as a continuation of County Route 553 (CR 553). It takes on CR 553's name, Transit Road, and progresses northward as a two-lane road. The highway serves the nearby Bob-O-Link Golf Course prior to entering a stretch of fields in Orchard Park, where it intersects with CR 460 (Milestrip Road), the eastward continuation of NY 179. The route continues on, loosely paralleling Cazenovia Creek and intersecting Michael and Willardshire roads (CR 365 and CR 377, respectively) before passing the Harvest Hill Golf Course in Elma. NY 187 soon intersects with Reserve Road, an east–west connection from US 20 eastbound, before turning to the northwest and terminating at its own junction with US 20. The Transit Road designation continues north onto US 20.

== History ==
When NY 78 was assigned as part of the 1930 renumbering of state highways in New York, it initially bypassed the southeastern Buffalo suburbs on a routing that passed through the village of East Aurora, the hamlet of Elma, and the village of Lancaster. It was rerouted c. 1932 to head west from East Aurora instead by way of an overlap with US 20 (now US 20A), then head north on Transit Road to rejoin its former routing in Depew. NY 78 was realigned again c. 1939 to overlap NY 16 northwest from East Aurora, bypassing the southernmost portion of Transit Road. The former routing of NY 78 between US 20A and US 20 was redesignated as NY 187 in the early 1940s.

== Major intersections ==
The entire route is in Erie County.

Location	mi	km	Destinations	Notes
Orchard Park–Aurora town line	0.00	0.00	US 20A (Quaker Road) – East Aurora, Orchard Park	Southern terminus
West Seneca	3.09	4.97	US 20 (Transit Road)	Northern terminus
1.000 mi = 1.609 km; 1.000 km = 0.621 mi
