= Woman's Canning and Preserving Company =

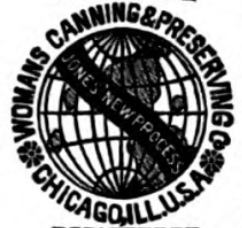
- Formerly: American Woman's Canning Company
- Type: Joint-stock company
- Industry: Manufacture and sale of canned and preserved food
- Founded: December 26, 1890
- Founder: Amanda Jones
- Defunct: 1920/21
- Fate: Closed
- Headquarters: Chicago, Illinois, U.S.

The Woman's Canning and Preserving Company (originally, American Woman's Canning Company; sometimes pluralized as Women's Canning and Preserving Company; 1890-1920/21) was the first all-women's company in the United States. It was established on December 26, 1890, by Amanda Jones, in Chicago, Illinois. Originally located at 161 LaSalle Street, the headquarters had moved to No. 19 Michigan Avenue by 1892. The object of the company was the manufacture and sale of canned and preserved food.

Jones had refused US$20,000 for an interest in the right to her patents, and as their value and the magnitude of a business promising to revolutionize the whole canning industry became better understood, it was found best to drop the name first chosen, "American Woman's Canning Company", with a capital stock of US$100,000, and take the name of "Woman's Canning and Preserving Company", with increased capitalization to US$1,000,000. The company had exclusive right to the use of her inventions of process, apparatus, and preserving vessels for canning without cooking. Jones wanted women stockholders in every U.S. town and factories in every county. The aim of the stock company was to establish canning and preserving factories in cities all over the U.S., employ women only and sell stock to no one but a woman, thus making it purely a woman's enterprise. It was intended as a means also of giving poor women an opportunity of earning a livelihood. Jones, the originator, had invented a patent way of carrying on the preserving and canning operations of fruits and vegetables without cooking or the use of chemicals. The company closed in 1920/21.

== Establishment ==
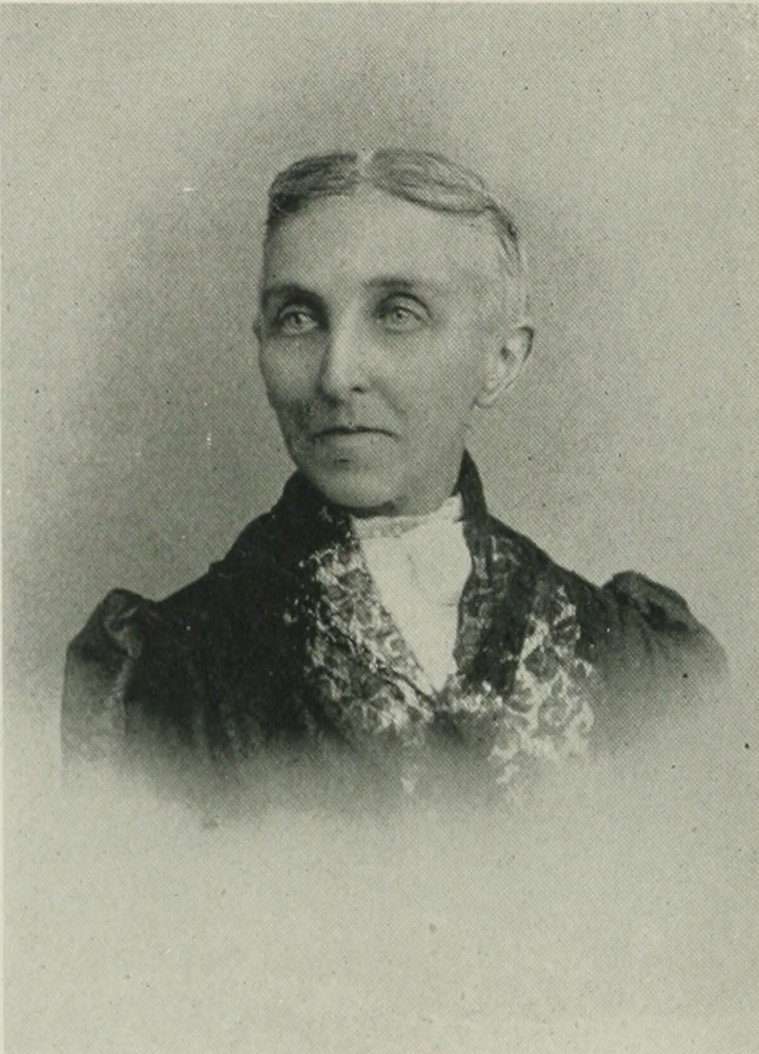
Amanda Jones, 1893

=== American Woman's Canning Company ===
At the inception of the business, when it was known as the "American Woman's Canning Company", Amanda Jones came forward with a patent process for pickling and preserving. In return for this, she received the vice presidency of the organization and a large amount of stock.

The "American Woman's Canning Company" planned to complete its organization in August 1890. At that time, the Commissioners were: Amanda T. Jones, Mary Allen West, Helen L. Hood, Frances Augusta Conant, and Eliza W. Bowman.

It was not long, before she proceeded to install various members of her family in office. Sisters and brothers were given important positions and Miss May Jones and Mr. Lafayette Jones, niece and nephew, were brought in to fill positions. The directorate determined on a change of affairs. They wanted to remove Amanda Jones, rename the organization, calling it the "Woman's Canning and Preserving Company", oust her process as well as her relatives. May Jones and Lafayette Jones sued the company for wages which they claimed were due for extra services.

This company was formed for the purpose of utilizing the inventions of Jones, relating to the canning of both uncooked and cooked food. She first discovered a method for canning uncooked fruits, vegetables and oysters without the use of chemicals, and when her patents were secured, refused to bargain for their use with capitalists already in the canning business, instead guarding her discovery. She dedicated it to the purpose of founding an industry for women - a company in which women should be sole stockholders, and should give employment only to women, except for heavier work unsuited to their strength. The company planned to put upon the market first a single product: lunch-tongues. The headquarters of the Company were located in Chicago, but factories for canning both cooked and uncooked articles were to be established elsewhere. the company held the right to can by Jones' processes, tongues of cattle, sheep and swine, poultry, game-birds, or other game, shell fish, the first of fresh and salt waters, as well as the exclusive right to can all uncooked goods as fruits, fruit syrups, grape juice as a substitute for win, cooked goods as breakfast dishes, desserts, children's prepared foods, eggs, dairy products, and soups.

=== Name change ===
The organization was completed on December 26, 1890, with a name change to "Woman's Canning and Preserving Company". It was the successor the "American Woman's Canning Company", which was partially organized the previous autumn. Finding its charter defective and the managers foreseeing that a larger capitalization would soon be required, the work of re-organization with a broader scope was undertaken. The original Board of Directors elected new officers. These Officers and Commissioners were: Anna Byford Leonard, president; Amanda T. Jones, Vice-President; Mary Allen West; Ellen Louise Demorest; Isabella Beecher Hooker, Emily M. J. Cooley, Clara Bewick Colby, Augusta Emma Mulkey Dolph, and Louise Thomas. The law firm of Elliott & Omohundro were employed, and it have carefully perfected the organization of the new company with US$1,000,000 capitalization.

== History ==
In the first three months, one plant was running, which put up for the market one cooked product, lunch tongue, and shipped 24,000 orders. Leonard left a year later when the factory had four stories and a basement, and the company had a working capital of US$40,000.

In December 1891, it was reported that too much stock had been sold. The women believe the unexpected condition of things was due to the questionable efforts of a promoter. In July 1891, the directors agreed with Gilbert L. Wilson to allow him to sell shares of stock on a 50 per cent commission. But Wilson assigned the contract to C. E. Sayler, and through the latter agent, the trouble came about. The women in charge of the company said he scattered broadcast over the States and territories circulars promising all sorts of benefits to purchasers of stock, none of which, they say, they are able to fulfill. Sayler's scheme, they said, was so successful that he was said to have sold US$23,350 worth of stock, of which the company duly received US$11,675, its half share. The women further believed that Sayler has arranged to sell considerable stock on the installment plan, for none of which he had accounted, but which is said to equal that fully paid up.

By 1892, this corporation was composed solely of women and employed only women, except the business manager, who was a man. They canned and preserved fruits, also canned meats for luncheon, tapioca puddings, and all varieties of vegetables. By 18902, two branch factories were run, one at Montello, Wisconsin, and one at Aurora, Illinois. In all, about 150 women and girls were employed, and the pay of eight-tenths of this force ran from US$4 to US$6 per week, the remaining two-tenths receiving from US$7 to US$10 per week. The four women employed in the office receive US$6, US$8, US$12 and US$18 per week respectively. The office force worked 9 hours per day and the factory force 10 hours. The women in the factory were employed at soldering and shaping cans, labeling and filling cans, covering and sealing cans, and in processing, which covered a variety of work in the preparation of the fruit, puddings, meats and vegetables for canning or preserving. The greater number work at processing and the pay for this work ran from US$4 to US$6 per week. There was a slow season in this business, when the force was reduced one-half, principally in the processing department, the women being laid off from three to four months. The business claimed to observe greater care and cleanliness in the preparation of its goods for the market than was usual in the trade, and asserted that its output was "a triumph of the culinary art." The working officers were Mrs. W. R. Omohundro, president; Mrs. H. L. Mérimée, recording secretary; Mrs. Sherwin Munn, secretary; Mrs. Eva M. Miller, treasurer. The business manager was a man, as having a woman originally in that capacity proved unsatisfactory. However, the company expected to find the right woman for that position in time.

A new branch was formed in 1892, the Woman's Baking Company, but it ceased operations in 1894.

Losing support of the company's officers, Jones left after three years.

In September 1895, the company closed it factory in Aurora, Illinois for the season, itsvia output for the year having been 200,000, principally of sweet corn.

In July 1897, the company was in the hands of a receiver. The company ceased operations in 1920/21.

== See also ==
- List of American women's firsts
