= Frances Augusta Conant =

American journalist

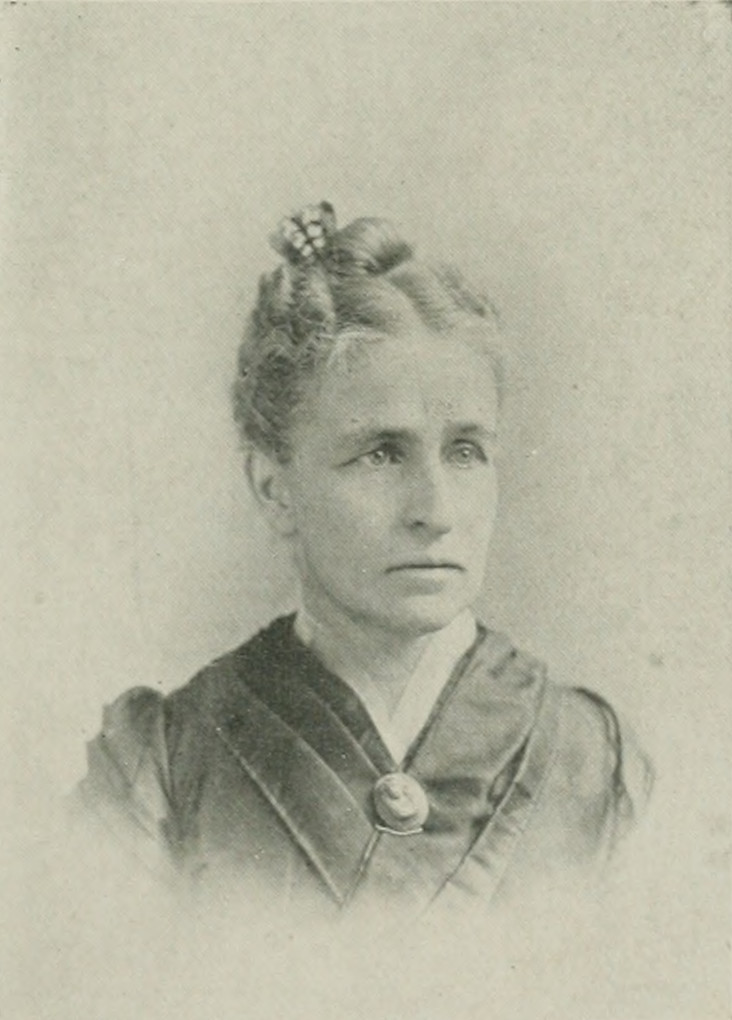
- Photo in A Woman of the Century
- Born: Frances Augusta Hemingway; December 23, 1842; West Burlington, New York, U.S.
- Died: April 28, 1903 (aged 60)
- Occupations: Journalist, editor, businesswoman
- Spouse: Claudius W. Conant (m. 1864)
- Writing career
- Notable work: Founder of the Illinois Woman's Press Association

Frances Augusta Conant (née, Hemingway; December 23, 1842 – April 28, 1903) was an American journalist, editor, and businesswoman. She was born in New York and began contributing to publications in her youth. Over the course of her career, she worked as a correspondent, editor, and contributor to numerous newspapers and journals in New York City, Philadelphia, and Chicago. She collaborated frequently with her husband, Claudius W. Conant, and was involved in writing for the Living Church, Advance, Industrial World, and other publications. Conant served as editor and business manager of the Journal of Industrial Education and later edited the American Traveler and Tourist. She was the co-founder and principal promoter of the Illinois Woman's Press Association (IWPA), where she served as secretary during its first two years and was later awarded honorary life membership. In the 1890s, she shifted her focus to business, helping to organize the Woman's Canning and Preserving Company.

== Early life and education ==
Frances Augusta Hemingway was born in West Burlington, New York, December 23, 1842. Her parents were Curtis and Martha R. Hemingway. She was educated in the western part of the State and in Brooklyn. In early girlhood, she became a contributor to New York publications.

== Career ==
In 1864, in Brooklyn, she married Claudius W. Conant, of New York. After 1892, Conant became a resident of Chicago, Illinois. She usually passed the winters in traveling through the South. She was for several years a special correspondent of the Living Church and a contributor to the Advance and other religious publications of Chicago, as well as to some journals, and, occasionally, short stories of hers appeared in leading New York City and Philadelphia publications.

During the World Cotton Centennial of 1884–85, she represented the Chicago Current. She was also engaged in writing up the machinery exhibit for the Industrial World, of Chicago, a mechanical and scientific journal.

She often wrote as a collaborator with her husband, who was connected with the American Field, and they frequently did editorial work interchangeably. Conant was an advocate of the cause of industrial education, and she was editor and business manager of the Journal of Industrial Education" in the early days of its publication. Her reputation as a writer of short sketches of travel lead to an engagement as editor of the American Traveler and Tourist, published in Chicago, which position she held for two years, until she became interested in a commercial enterprise. Though rarely working in any associations, she developed ability as a promoter and organizer.

Following up on an idea of Marion A. McBride of The Boston Post during the World Cotton Centennial, Conant and Dr. Julia Holmes Smith helped found the IWPA, and Conant was the principal promoter of the IWPA, the first independent State organization for the purpose of affording practical assistance to women in literary pursuits. She was secretary of that association for the first two years, and received an honorary life membership in recognition of her services.

Conant was noted for being generous in giving time and thought to appeals for help. When a plan for employing large numbers of untrained women was presented to Conant, she withdrew from editorial work, in 1891, to engage in the promotion and organization of a corporation projected to give, eventually, remunerative employment to thousands of women in all parts of the country: the Woman's Canning and Preserving Company. Conant was secretary of the company during its first year, took an active part in the business management, and then she resigned.

== Death ==
Frances Conant died April 28, 1903, in Cook County, Illinois.
