= West Burlington, New York =

- hamlet
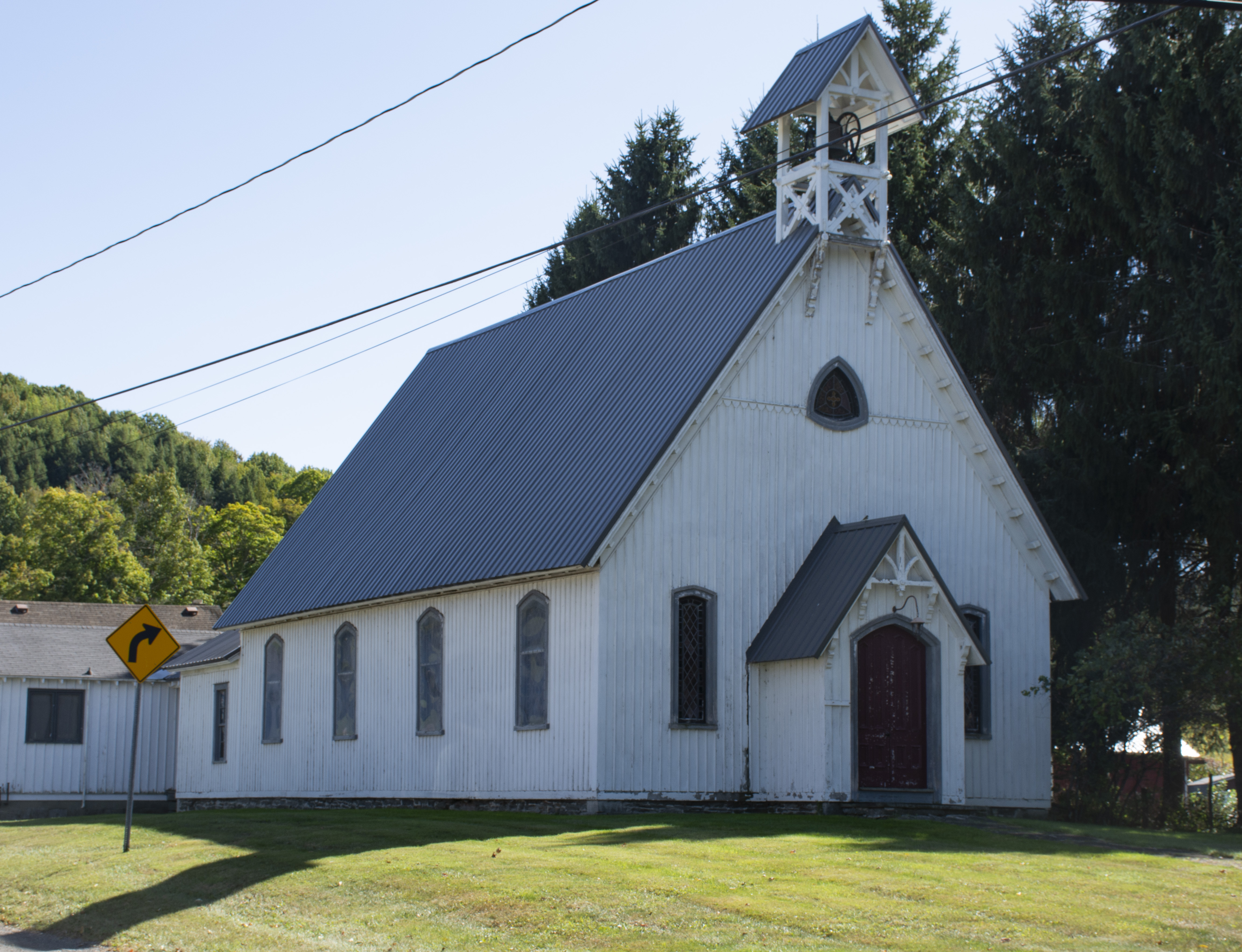
- West Burlington Memorial Church

- Location within New York
- Coordinates: 42°42′27″N 75°11′16″W
- Country: United States
- State: New York
- County: Otsego
- Elevation: 1,266 ft (386 m)
- Time zone: UTC-5 (Eastern (EST))
  - Summer (DST): UTC-4 (EDT)
- ZIP code: 13482
- Area code: 607
- GNIS feature ID: 969155

West Burlington is a hamlet in the western part of the Town of Burlington in Otsego County, New York, United States. It is located at 42.7075°N 75.1877°W, three miles (4.8 km) east of the town of Edmeston on NY 51 and NY 80.

The West Burlington Memorial Church was listed on the National Register of Historic Places in 2001.

== Notable person ==
- Frances Augusta Hemingway Conant was born here.
