= Bonfoy–Barstow House =

Historic house in New York, United States

- U.S. National Register of Historic Places
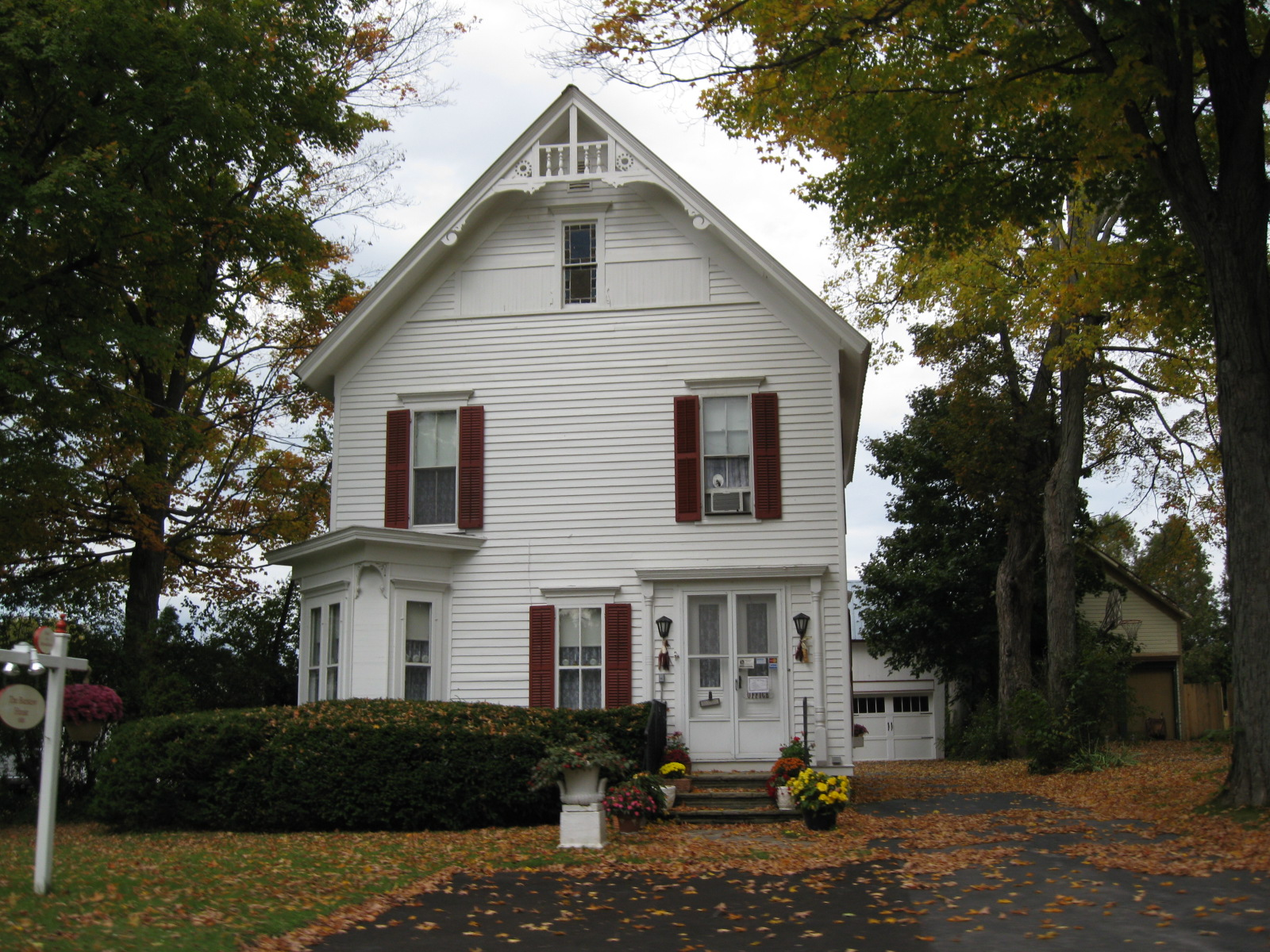
- Bonfoy–Barstow House, October 2009

- Location within New York Location within the United States
- Location: 485 E. Main St., West Winfield, New York
- Coordinates: 42°54′10″N 75°11′13″W
- Area: less than one acre
- Built: 1888
- NRHP reference No.: 11000595
- Added to NRHP: August 24, 2011

The Bonfoy–Barstow House is a historic house located at 485 East Main Street in West Winfield, Herkimer County, New York.

== Description and history ==
It was built in 1888, and consists of a square front block with rear addition. They are of frame construction with gable roofs. The front block is 2 1/2 stories, two bays by two bays. The rear addition was originally a two-story, two-bay-wide block with a one-story shed roofed wing. That shed roofed wing was expanded to two-stories in the 1940s. Also, on the property is a contributing carriage house. It is an example of late-19th century, middle class vernacular architecture.

It was listed on the National Register of Historic Places on August 24, 2011.
