= West Burlington Memorial Church =

Historic church in New York, United States

- U.S. National Register of Historic Places
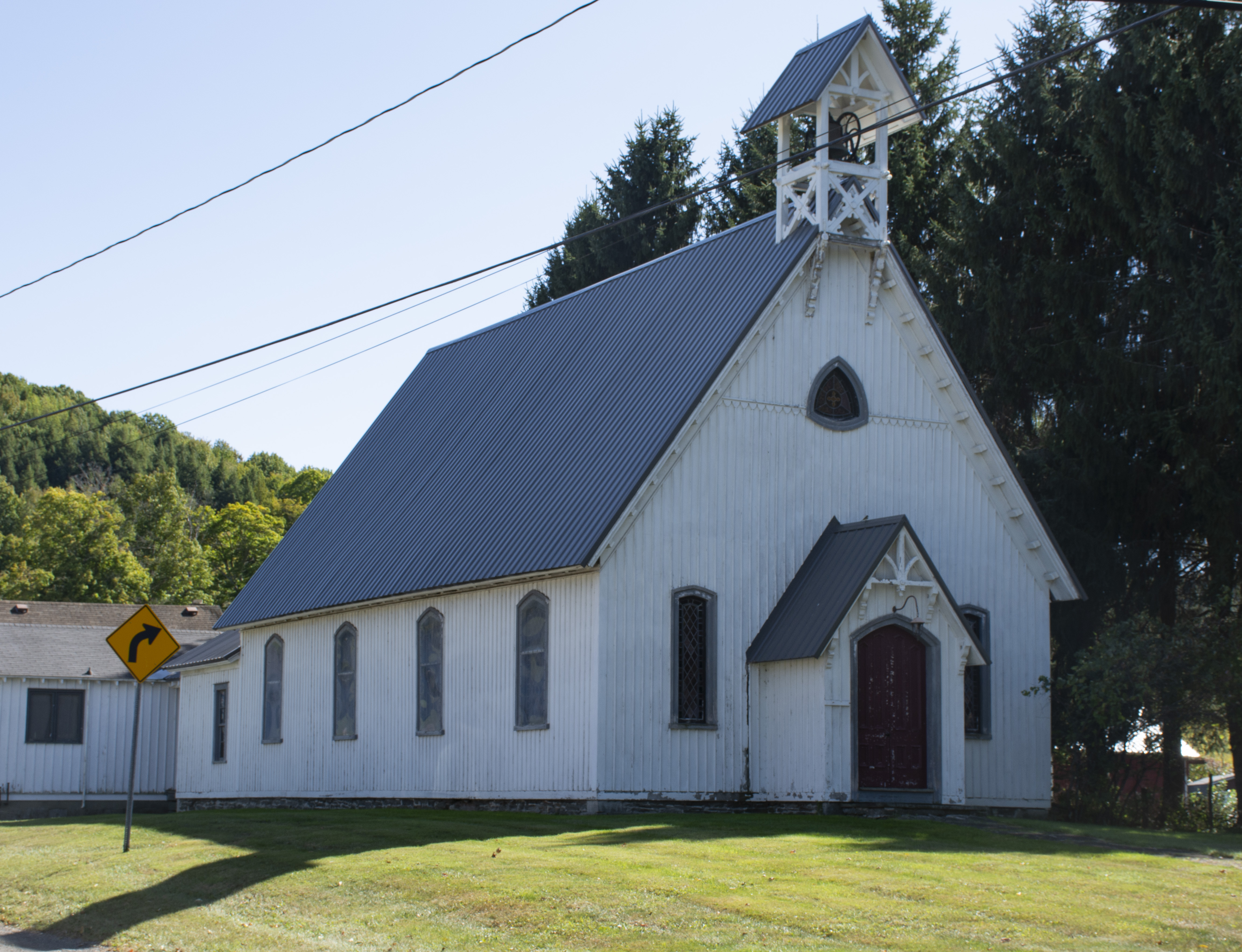

- Location within New York Location within the United States
- Location: NY 80, West Burlington, New York
- Coordinates: 42°42′25″N 75°11′16″W
- Area: less than one acre
- Built: 1868
- Architect: Robert Wakeman Hill
- Architectural style: Gothic Revival
- NRHP reference No.: 00001661
- Added to NRHP: January 16, 2001

West Burlington Memorial Church, also known as Christ Church, is a historic Episcopal church on NY 80 in West Burlington, Otsego County, New York. It was built in 1868 in the Gothic Revival style. It is a one-story rectangular building, three bays wide and four bays deep. The building is of wood-frame construction with board-and-batten siding. It sits on a fieldstone foundation with a steep gable roof and broad overhanging eaves. The roof is surmounted by a wooden bell cote.

It was listed on the National Register of Historic Places in 2001.
