= New York State Route 51 =

State highway in central New York, US

New York State Route 51
- NY 51 highlighted in red

Route information
- Maintained by NYSDOT
- Length: 55.02 mi (88.55 km)
- Existed: 1930–present

Major junctions
- South end: NY 8 in Guilford
- NY 23 in Morris; US 20 in West Winfield; NY 5S in Ilion
- North end: NY 5 in Herkimer

Location
- Country: United States
- State: New York
- Counties: Chenango, Otsego, Herkimer

Highway system
- New York Highways; Interstate; US; State; Reference; Parkways
← NY 50	→ NY 52

New York State Route 51 (NY 51) is a 55.02-mile-long (88.55 km) north–south state highway in the central part of the U.S. state of New York. The highway runs generally in a southwest to northeast direction from NY 8 in the hamlet of Mount Upton to north of the village of Ilion, where it ends at NY 5. NY 51 intersects several primary routes including, a short overlap with NY 23 in the village of Morris, a 2.8-mile (4.5 km) overlap with U.S. Route 20 (US 20) in Winfield, and NY 5S in Illion. NY 51 is a two-lane highway its entire length.

In the 1920s, a segment of modern NY 51 between West Burlington and West Winfield was designated as part of NY 44, a route that extended from Sidney to Utica. At the time, this was the only substantial segment of modern NY 51 to have a route number even though all of modern NY 51 south of Ilion was state-maintained. In the 1930 renumbering of state highways in New York, the section of NY 44 from West Burlington to West Winfield became part of the new NY 51, which utilized all of its modern routing from Mount Upton to Ilion upon assignment. NY 51 was extended across the Mohawk River to NY 5 in North Ilion in the mid-1960s.

== Route description ==
=== Mount Upton to Burlington Flats ===
NY 51 begins at an intersection with NY 8 and Chenango County Route 37 (CR 37) in the hamlet of Mount Upton (in the town of Guilford). NY 51 proceeds east through Mount Upton as a two-lane continuation of CR 37, passing multiple residences in Mount Upton. Just after, the route crosses the Unadilla River and leave Chenango County for Otsego County. Now in the town of Butternuts, reaching a junction with the southern terminus of CR 18, NY 51 winds northeast through town a two-lane rural roadway through the town.

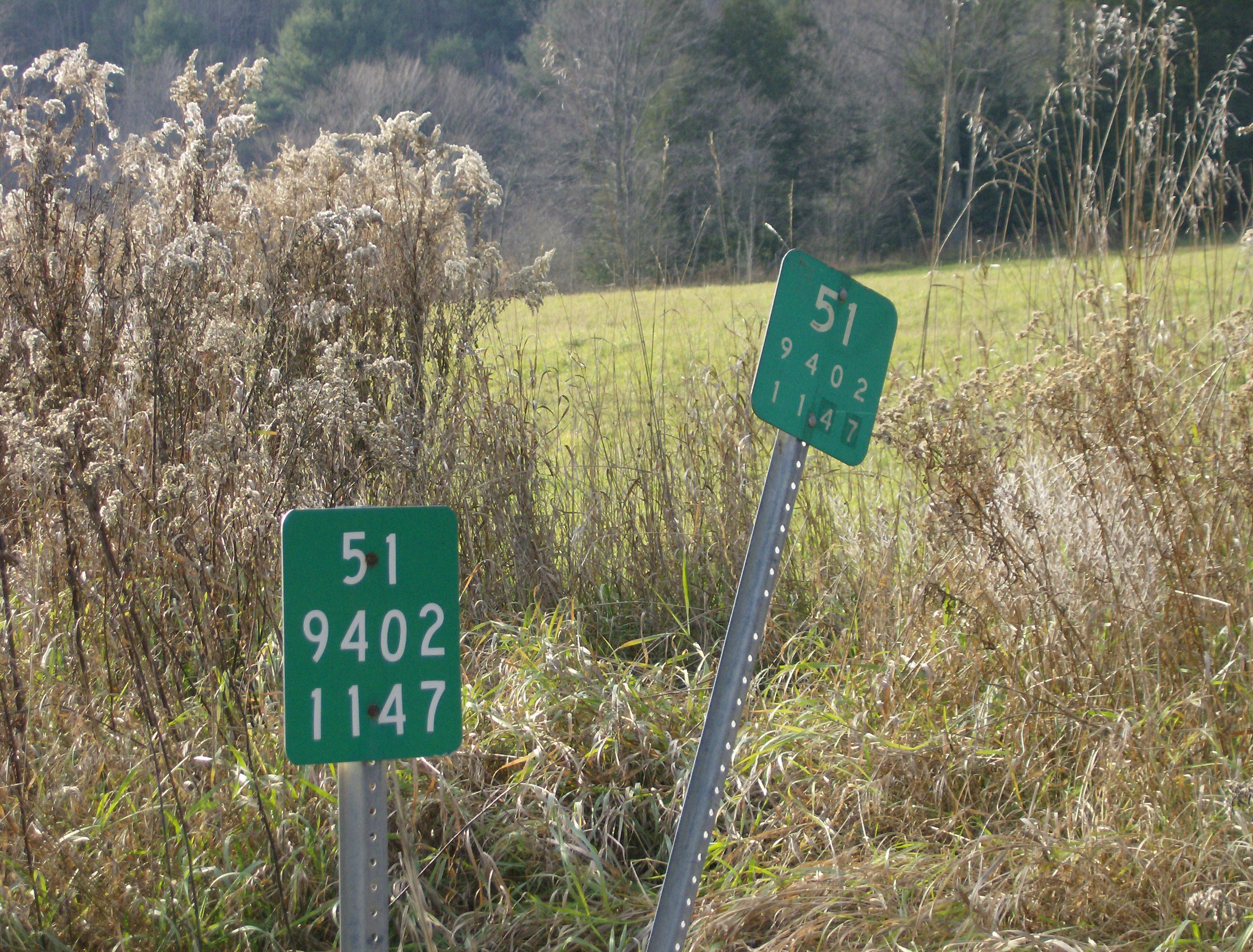
Old and new style reference markers on NY 51 in Otsego County between Morris and New Lisbon

The route starts paralleling Butternut Creek through town, entering the hamlet of Copes Corners, where NY 51 junctions with CR 3. The route passes west of Copes Corners Park, soon passing the Gilbertsville–Mount Upton Central School just north of the hamlet. NY 51 winds north along Butternut Creek, soon gaining the moniker of Marion Avenue as it reaches the village of Gilbertsville. The route becomes a two-lane residential street through Gilbertsville, reaching a junction with Cliff Street, where it turns northeast through the village. The route soon junctions with Reservoir Road, which marks the northern end of Gilbertsville and access to Butternuts Cemetery. Back in the town of Butternuts, NY 51 drops the Marion Avenue moniker and continues north through the rural regions north of Gilbertsville along Butternut Creek.

NY 51 begins to stretch further and further away from Butternut Creek, soon crossing into the town of Morris.and begins to pass more residences as it winds northeast. Climbing several hills, NY 51 eventually enters the village of Morris, where almost immediately, it reaches a junction with NY 23. NY 23 and NY 51 become concurrent at this junction, crossing over a tributary of Butternut Creek and entering the village center. Now known as Main Street, NY 23 and NY 51 pass multiple businesses before reaching the junction with Broad Street, where NY 23 turns east onto Broad and NY 51 continues east on Main. After Hargrave Street, NY 51 leaves the village of Morris and returns to the namesake town.

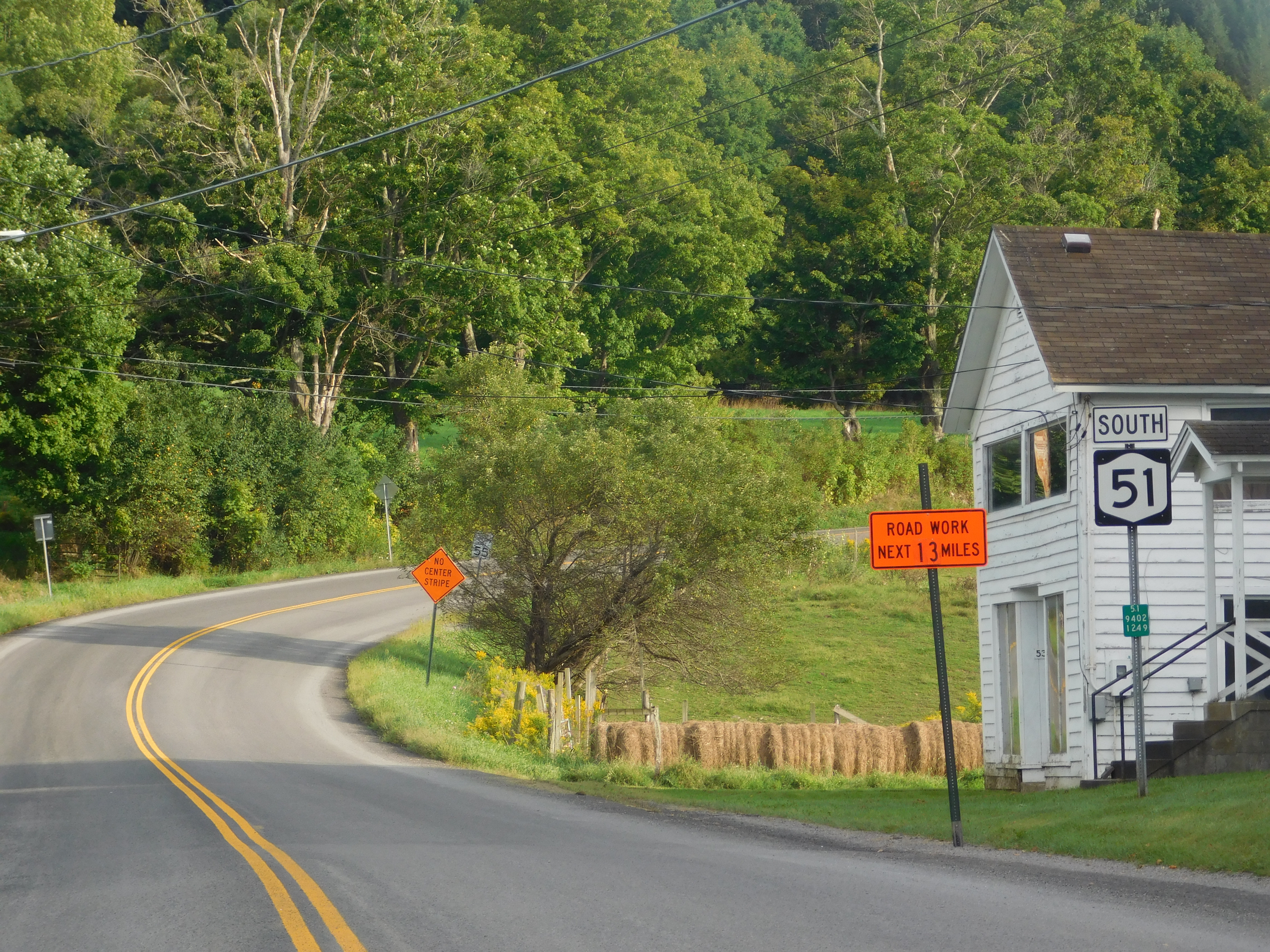
NY 51 southbound from NY 80 in West Burlington

NY 51 continues through Morris, reaching a junction with the southern terminus of CR 49 in the rural hamlet of Elm Grove. Passing north of a mobile home park, the route begins to bend northward and enters the town of New Lisbon, where it junctions with the western terminus of CR 12, which connects to the namesake hamlet. Continuing north through New Lisbon, NY 51 remains the main two-lane rural road through the town, reaching a junction with Harrington Road, where it turns northeast into the hamlet of Garrattsville. In the center of the residential hamlet, NY 51 junctions with CR 16, where the routes exchange rights-of-way. NY 51 turns northward on the alignment used by CR 16 while CR 16 heads northeast on the alignment used by NY 51.

After a curve near High Street, NY 51 leaves Garrattsville, reaching the eastern terminus of CR 17, soon crossing into the town of Burlington. The route remains rural through Burlington, passing some residences in the hamlet of West Burlington, before reaching a junction with NY 80 east of Robinson Corners. NY 80 and NY 51 become concurrent and proceed northeast through the town of Burlington as a two-lane rural roadway. The short concurrency reaches the hamlet of Barrett Corners, where NY 51 turns northward while NY 80 turns east. Continuing north through Burlington, NY 51 reaches the hamlet of Chapinville, where it turns eastward for a short distance at Arnold Road. Crossing a small creek, the route soon turns northward at Gardner Road, reaching the hamlet of Burlington Flats.

=== Burlington Flats to Herkimer ===
At Burlington Flats, NY 51 turns northeast at Washburn Road, crossing two junctions with CR 19. After CR 19, the route retains its rural nature through Burlington, soon reaching the hamlet of West Exeter. In the middle of the hamlet, NY 51 reaches a junction with the western terminus of CR 22. Just north of West Exeter, the route soon reaches CR 23, where the route begins a northwestern stretch through the town of Plainfield. The route crosses the Skaneateles Turnpike at-grade as NY 51 bypasses the hamlet of Plainfield. After a gradual curve, the route soon turns northwest and crosses the Herkimer County line just north of a junction with CR 21.

Now in the town of Winfield, NY 51 crosses a junction with Truax and Forks Road (unsigned CR 162). The route crosses through the hamlet of Woods Corners before entering the village of West Winfield. Now known as South Street, NY 51 soon reaches the Unadilla River, reaching the center of West Winfield. Several blocks north of the river, NY 51 reaches a junction with US 20 (West Main Street). NY 51 and US 20 become concurrent along East Main Street, crossing north of Winfield Memorial Town Park, soon leaving the village. NY 51 and US 20 continue east through the town of Winfield, crossing through the hamlet of Hitching Corner and soon into the hamlet of East Winfield.

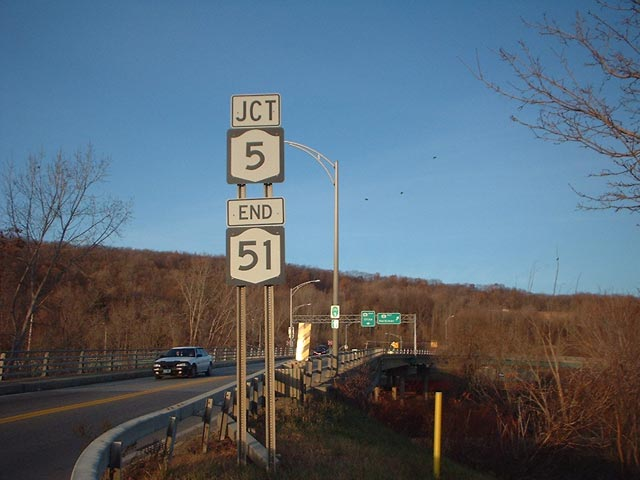
NY 51 approaching the junction with NY 5 in Herkimer

At the eastern end of East Whitfield, NY 51 turns north off of US 20, continuing north through the rural parts of Winfield. Crossing a former railroad line, the route bypasses Cedarville Station, which is connected via a junction with Chepachet Road (CR 75). Crossing the Unadilla River for the third time since Mount Upton, the route turns northward past the hamlet of Chepachet before crossing into the town of Columbia and soon into the town of Litchfield. In Litchfield, NY 51 reaches the intersection with Jordanville Road (CR 18), where it turns westward and soon reaches the junction with Wall Street (CR 79), where it turns northward once again.

Continuing north along a brook, NY 51 continues through Litchfield, passing through Illion Gorge before turning northeast along Steele Creek. NY 51 runs north of the Illion Reservoir No. 2 and crosses into the town of German Flatts, soon reaching the hamlet of South Ilion, where it meets a junction with CR 51. A couple blocks to the north, NY 51 turns north and enters the village of Ilion, where the route gains the moniker of Otsego Street. Becoming the main north–south street through Ilion, the route turns northeast at a junction with John Street. Otsego Street becomes the main commercial street through the village, changing names to Central Avenue at a junction with Clark Street. After the name change, NY 51 enters an interchange with NY 5S and then crosses the Mohawk River into the town of Herkimer, where NY 51 enters an interchange with NY 5. This junction marks the northern terminus of NY 51, just south of the New York State Thruway (I-90).

== History ==
In 1908, the New York State Legislature created Route 23, an unsigned legislative route extending from Ilion to the North Country via West Winfield and Utica. The route began at Route 6 (later NY 5S and now Clark Street) in Ilion and followed what is now NY 51 southwest to West Winfield. At the center of the village, Route 23 continued west toward Utica on modern U.S. Route 20. In 1912, Route 23 was truncated to begin at the western village line of West Winfield while the portion of the route east of that point became Route 23-a. The change was reverted on March 1, 1921, moving the start of Route 23 back to Ilion.

In the mid-1920s, the segment of modern NY 51 between West Burlington and West Winfield was designated as part of NY 44, a route that extended south from West Burlington to Sidney and north from West Winfield to Utica. At the time, this was the only substantial segment of what is now NY 51 to have a route number even though all of modern NY 51 south of Ilion was state-maintained. In the 1930 renumbering of state highways in New York, most of NY 44 became part of NY 8. The section from West Burlington to West Winfield, however, became part of the new NY 51, which utilized all of its modern routing from Mount Upton to Ilion upon assignment. It was extended across the Mohawk River to NY 5 in North Ilion in the mid-1960s.

On May 2, 2019, the bridge over the Erie Canal, Mohawk River and railroad that connects NY 5S and NY 5 was closed to traffic. The NYSDOT stated that a large amount of superstructure rehabilitation projects needed to be done. Along with repairing the substructure, bridge joints and bearings are to be replaced. The bridge was built in 1968 and carries more than 13,000 vehicles each day. Traffic was detoured to use NY 28 to cross the river. The bridge reopened to traffic on August 31, 2019.

== Major intersections ==
County	Location	mi	km	Destinations	Notes
Chenango	Town of Guilford	0.00	0.00	NY 8 – Sidney, New Berlin	Southern terminus; hamlet of Mount Upton
Otsego	Village of Morris	11.55	18.59	NY 23 west – Norwich	Western terminus of NY 23 / NY 51 overlap
Otsego	Village of Morris	12.03	19.36	NY 23 east (South Broad Street) – Oneonta	Eastern terminus of NY 23 / NY 51 overlap
Otsego	Town of Burlington	25.00	40.23	NY 80 west – Edmeston, New Berlin	Western terminus of NY 51 / NY 80 overlap; hamlet of West Burlington
Otsego	Town of Burlington	26.06	41.94	NY 80 east – Cooperstown	Eastern terminus of NY 51 / NY 80 overlap
Herkimer	West Winfield	40.16	64.63	US 20 west (West Main Street) – Bridgewater, Auburn	Western terminus of US 20 / NY 51 overlap
Herkimer	Town of Winfield	43.00	69.20	US 20 east – Richfield Springs	Eastern terminus of US 20 / NY 51 overlap; hamlet of Birmingham Corners
Herkimer	Ilion	54.54	87.77	Clark Street	Former routing of NY 5S
Herkimer	Ilion	54.70– 54.86	88.03– 88.29	NY 5S to I-90 / New York Thruway – Frankfort, Mohawk, Utica	Partial cloverleaf interchange; to I-90 via NY 5S east
Herkimer	Town of Herkimer	55.02	88.55	NY 5	Northern terminus, trumpet interchange
1.000 mi = 1.609 km; 1.000 km = 0.621 mi: Concurrency terminus
