= West Winfield, New York =

- Village
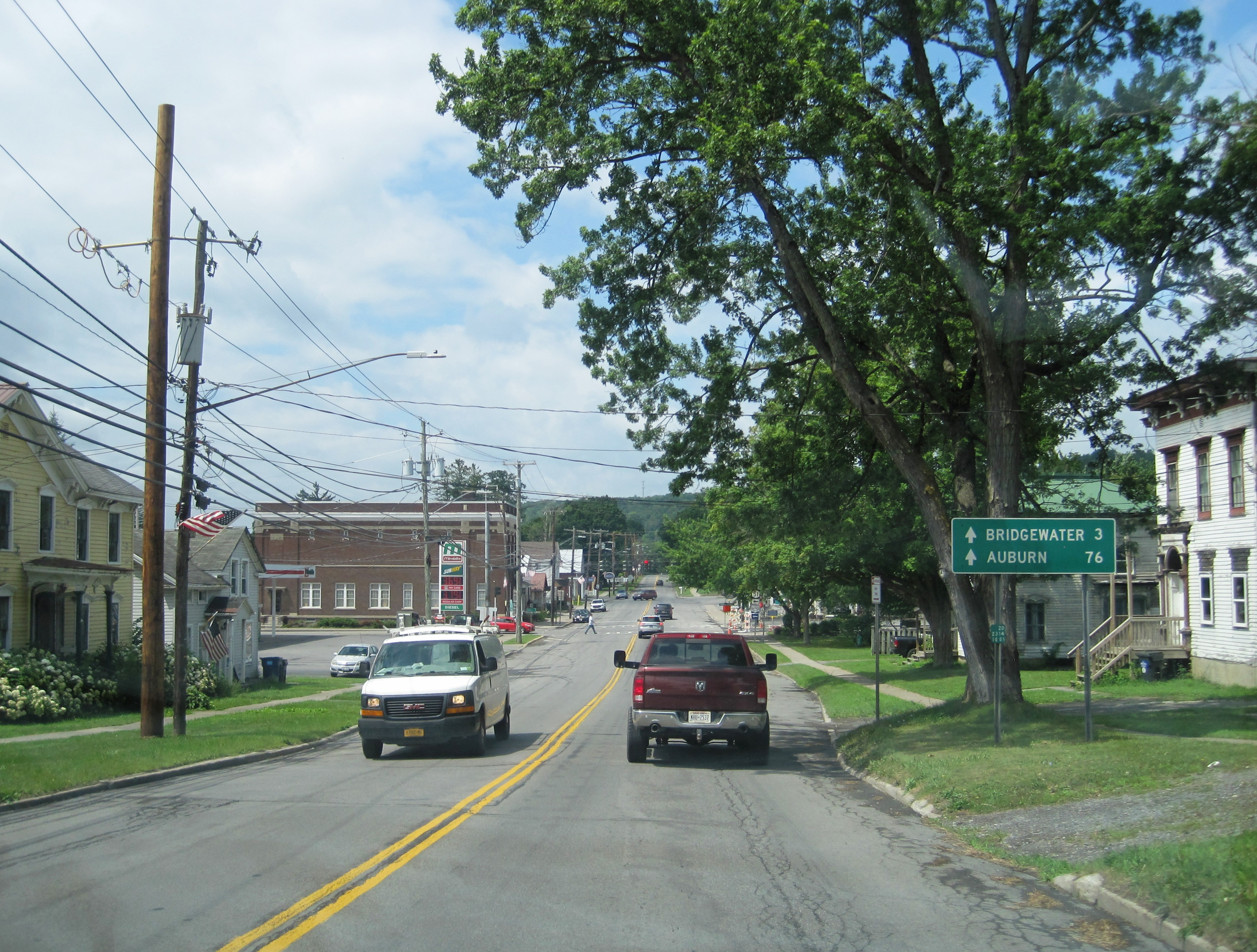
- Along westbound Main Street

- Location within New York Location within the United States
- Coordinates: 42°53′4″N 75°11′31″W
- Country: United States
- State: New York
- County: Herkimer
- Town: Winfield

Government
  - Mayor: Andrew Bryce

Area
  - Total: 0.91 sq mi (2.36 km^{2})
  - Land: 0.91 sq mi (2.36 km^{2})
  - Water: 0 sq mi (0.00 km^{2})
- Elevation: 1,191 ft (363 m)

Population (2020)
  - Total: 733
  - Density: 804.4/sq mi (310.59/km^{2})
- Time zone: UTC-5 (Eastern (EST))
  - Summer (DST): UTC-4 (EDT)
- ZIP code: 13491
- Area code: 315
- FIPS code: 36-81292
- GNIS feature ID: 0970891
- Website: westwinfieldny.gov

West Winfield is a village in the town of Winfield in Herkimer County, New York, United States. As of the 2020 census, West Winfield had a population of 733. The village is indirectly named after General Winfield Scott. The village is south of Utica.

== History ==
An early school in the town, the West Winfield Academy (Mt. Markham), was established in 1850.

An extensive tannery was last run by the Hiteman Leather Co. and more recently was a superfund cleanup site.

The Bonfoy–Barstow House was listed on the National Register of Historic Places in 2011.

== Geography ==
According to the United States Census Bureau, the village has a total area of 0.91 square miles (2.36 km^{2}), all land.

A branch of the Unadilla River, a tributary of the Susquehanna River, flows through the village.

The village is on U.S. Route 20 (Main Street) at the junction of New York State Route 51 (South Street). US-20 leads east 11 miles (18 km) to Richfield Springs and west 3 miles (5 km) to Bridgewater. NY-51 leads south 12 miles (19 km) to Burlington Flats. Utica is 17 miles (27 km) to the north via county roads.

== Demographics ==
Historical population
Census	Pop.	Note	%±
1880	594		—
1890	741		24.7%
1900	771		4.0%
1910	726		−5.8%
1920	725		−0.1%
1930	779		7.4%
1940	754		−3.2%
1950	832		10.3%
1960	960		15.4%
1970	1,018		6.0%
1980	979		−3.8%
1990	871		−11.0%
2000	862		−1.0%
2010	826		−4.2%
2020	733		−11.3%
U.S. Decennial Census

As of the census of 2000, there were 862 people, 352 households, and 241 families residing in the village. The population density was 959.3 inhabitants per square mile (370.4/km^{2}). There were 372 housing units at an average density of 414.0 per square mile (159.8/km^{2}). The racial makeup of the village was 99.65% White, 0.23% Asian and 0.12% Pacific Islander. Hispanic or Latino of any race were 0.12% of the population.

There were 352 households, out of which 27.6% had children under the age of 18 living with them, 53.1% were married couples living together, 11.4% had a female householder with no husband present, and 31.5% were non-families. 29.0% of all households were made up of individuals, and 19.9% had someone living alone who was 65 years of age or older. The average household size was 2.45 and the average family size was 3.00.

In the village, the population was spread out, with 26.0% under the age of 18, 7.0% from 18 to 24, 20.9% from 25 to 44, 25.5% from 45 to 64, and 20.6% who were 65 years of age or older. The median age was 41 years. For every 100 females, there were 88.2 males. For every 100 females age 18 and over, there were 84.9 males.

The median income for a household in the village was $33,947, and the median income for a family was $42,031. Males had a median income of $26,793 versus $23,500 for females. The per capita income for the village was $16,465. About 7.6% of families and 9.1% of the population were below the poverty line, including 11.9% of those under age 18 and 8.4% of those age 65 or over.

== Schools ==
The village is within the Mt. Markham Central School District. The Mt. Markham Middle School is located within the village. However, the high school and elementary school are located just outside the village but still within the town of Winfield.
