= Western Rural =

- Categories: Agricultural magazine
- Frequency: Weekly
- Founded: 1862
- Final issue: 1901
- Country: USA
- Based in: 113 Madison St., Chicago, Illinois; 192 Jefferson Avenue, Detroit, Michigan

Western Rural was a weekly journal published in Chicago, Illinois and Detroit, Michigan. It existed between 1862 and 1901.

== History and profile ==
Western Rural was founded in 1862. It published information relating to agriculture, horticulture, and livestock as well as rural news and domestic affairs. It was intended for "western farms, western homes, and western affairs in general" as proclaimed by its masthead. The edition published in Chicago was intended for the western United States, while the Detroit edition was for Michigan and Canada. The magazine ceased publication in 1901.
