= Winfield (town), New York =

Winfield, New York
- Town
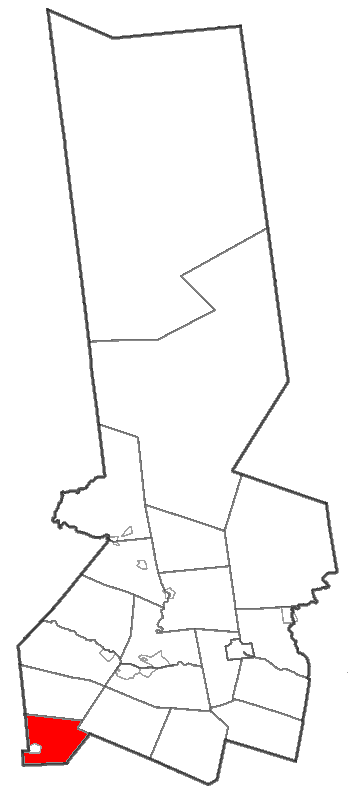
- Location of Winfield in Herkimer County

- Location within New York Location within the United States
- Coordinates: 42°53′18″N 75°9′54″W
- Country: United States
- State: New York
- County: Herkimer

Government
  - Town Supervisor: Charles W. Osborn (R) Town Council: Howard A. Marsh, Sr. (D); Robert E. Royce (R); Michael P. Peo (R); Sandra J. Smith (My Home Town)

Area
  - Total: 23.65 sq mi (61.26 km^{2})
  - Land: 23.64 sq mi (61.23 km^{2})
  - Water: 0.012 sq mi (0.03 km^{2})

Population (2010)
  - Total: 2,086
  - Density: 88/sq mi (34.1/km^{2})
- Time zone: EST
  - Summer (DST): EDT
- ZIP Codes: 13491 (West Winfield); 13357 (Ilion)
- Area code: 315
- FIPS code: 36-043-82568
- GNIS feature ID: 0979650
- Website: townofwinfieldny.gov

Winfield is a town in Herkimer County, New York, United States. The population was 2,086 at the 2010 census. The town is named after General Winfield Scott and is in the southwestern corner of the county, south of Utica.

== History ==
The area was first settled circa 1789, primarily by people from New England. The town of Winfield was formed from parts of Richfield, Plainfield (both in Otsego County), and Litchfield (Herkimer County) in 1816. Herkimer County's proximity to the site where the Erie Canal was a possible reason for forming the town over county lines.

== Geography ==
According to the United States Census Bureau, the town has a total area of 23.7 square miles (61.3 km^{2}), of which 0.01 square miles (0.03 km^{2}), or 0.05%, are water.

The southern town line and part of the western town line are the border of Otsego County. The remainder of the western town line is the border of Oneida County.

The East Branch of the Unadilla River flows from northeast to southwest through the town. Winfield Creek flows into the Unadilla River at West Winfield village. The Unadilla is part of the Susquehanna River watershed. The northeastern corner of the town drains northeast via Steele Creek to the Mohawk River and is part of the Hudson River watershed.

U.S. Route 20 passes across the southern part of the town and is briefly conjoined with New York State Route 51.

== Demographics ==
Historical population
Census	Pop.	Note	%±
1820	1,752		—
1830	1,778		1.5%
1840	1,652		−7.1%
1850	1,481		−10.4%
1860	1,480		−0.1%
1870	1,561		5.5%
1880	1,597		2.3%
1890	1,625		1.8%
1900	1,475		−9.2%
1910	1,386		−6.0%
1920	1,312		−5.3%
1930	1,449		10.4%
1940	1,333		−8.0%
1950	1,462		9.7%
1960	1,750		19.7%
1970	2,013		15.0%
1980	2,053		2.0%
1990	2,146		4.5%
2000	2,202		2.6%
2010	2,086		−5.3%
2014 (est.)	2,128		2.0%
U.S. Decennial Census

As of the census of 2000, there were 2,202 people, 821 households, and 614 families residing in the town. The population density was 93.1 inhabitants per square mile (35.9/km^{2}). There were 871 housing units at an average density of 36.8 per square mile (14.2/km^{2}). The racial makeup of the town was 98.73% White, 0.14% African American, 0.14% Native American, 0.27% Asian, 0.05% Pacific Islander, and 0.68% from two or more races. Hispanic or Latino of any race were 0.59% of the population.

There were 821 households, out of which 35.7% had children under the age of 18 living with them, 59.2% were married couples living together, 10.8% had a female householder with no husband present, and 25.1% were non-families. 22.4% of all households were made up of individuals, and 13.4% had someone living alone who was 65 years of age or older. The average household size was 2.68 and the average family size was 3.10.

In the town, the population was spread out, with 28.6% under the age of 18, 7.2% from 18 to 24, 25.1% from 25 to 44, 24.5% from 45 to 64, and 14.6% who were 65 years of age or older. The median age was 38 years. For every 100 females, there were 95.2 males. For every 100 females age 18 and over, there were 94.8 males.

The median income for a household in the town was $35,588, and the median income for a family was $42,841. Males had a median income of $27,414 versus $21,667 for females. The per capita income for the town was $16,809. About 6.4% of families and 8.0% of the population were below the poverty line, including 12.1% of those under age 18 and 4.9% of those age 65 or over.

== Notable person ==
- Seth M. Gates, U.S. congressman from New York

== Communities and locations in Winfield ==
- Birmingham Corners – A hamlet near the eastern town line on Routes US-20/NY-51.
- Cedarville – A hamlet in the northeastern corner of the town, located at the town line on NY-51.
- Cedarville Station – A hamlet southwest of Chepachet on NY-51.
- Chepachet – A hamlet southwest of Cedarville on NY-51.
- East Winfield – A location east of Hitching Corner on US-20
- Hitching Corner – A hamlet east of West Winfield village on combined US-20/NY-51.
- Meeting House Green – A location southeast of North Winfield, located on County Road 172. The Brace Farm and Meetinghouse Green Road Cemetery were listed on the National Register of Historic Places in 2013.
- North Winfield – A hamlet at the northern town line on County Road 91.
- Round Top – An elevation located southeast of East Winfield.
- West Winfield – The village of West Winfield, located on US-20, is close to the western town line.
- Woods Corners – A hamlet in the southwestern part of the town, south of West Winfield on NY-51.
