= Mount Upton, New York =

Hamlet in Guilford, New York, U.S.

Coordinates: 42°25′35″N 75°23′00″W

Mount Upton is a hamlet on the Unadilla River in the town of Guilford in Chenango County, New York, United States. It has its own post office and Zip Code of 13809.

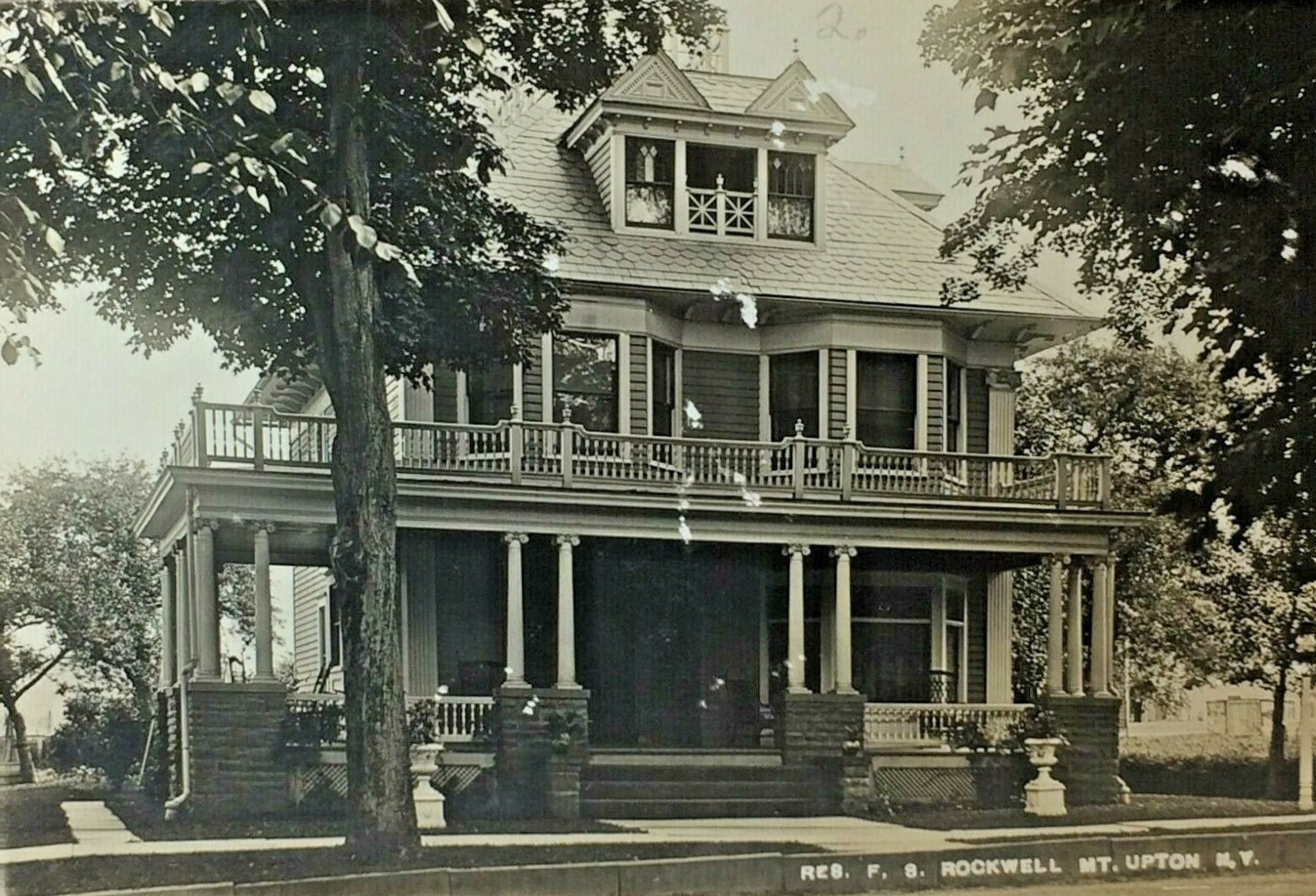
1104 County Road 37, Mt. Upton, NY - 1911

There is a United Methodist Church in Mount Upton.

== Notable people ==
- E. J. Richmond (1825-1918), author
