= Plainfield, New York =

Town in New York, United States

- Town
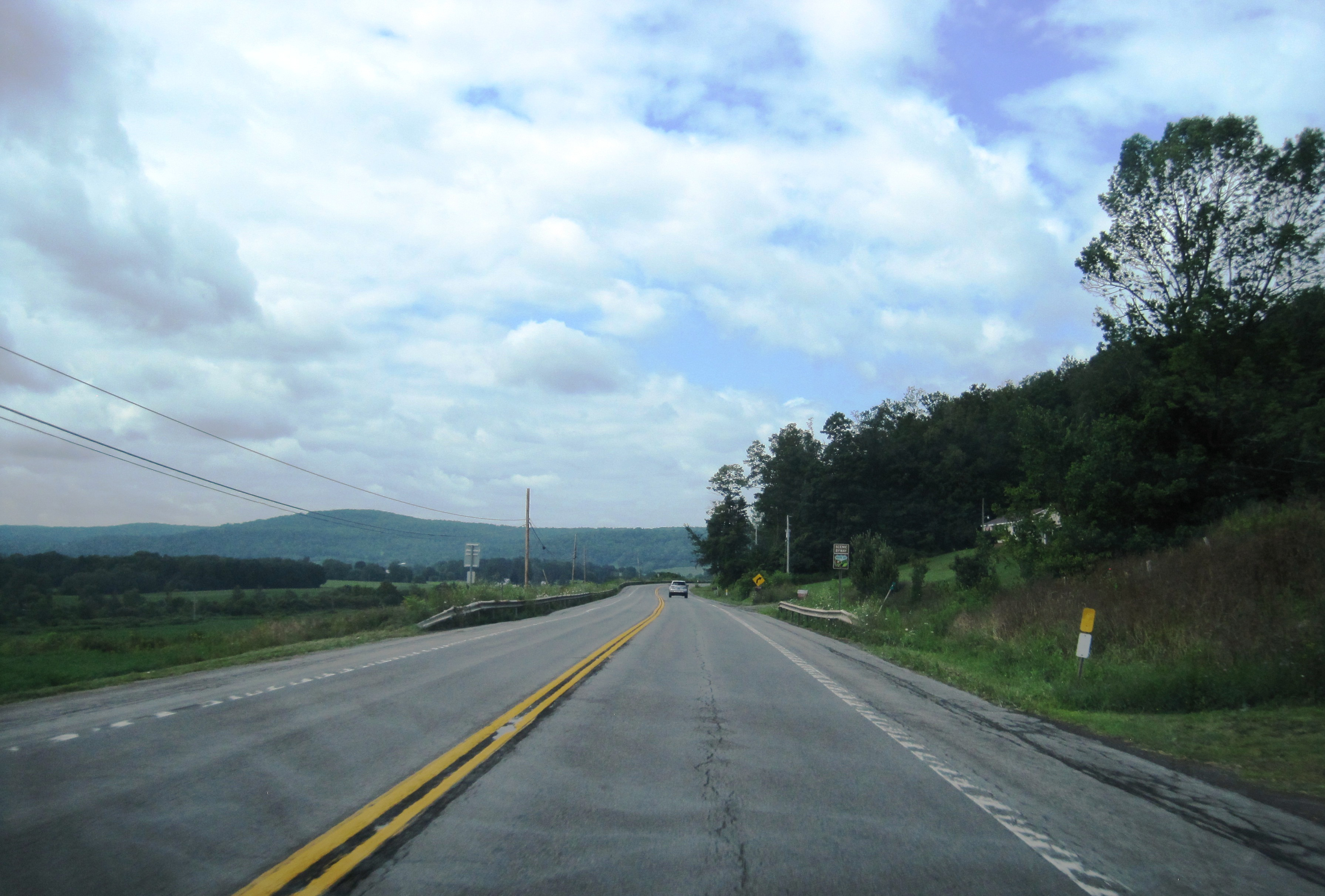
- Scenery in Plainfield along westbound US 20

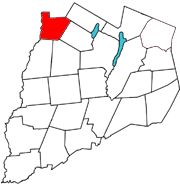
- Otsego County map with the Town of Plainfield in red
- Coordinates: 42°49′13″N 75°11′50″W
- Country: United States
- State: New York
- County: Otsego

Area
  - Total: 29.51 sq mi (76.42 km^{2})
  - Land: 29.51 sq mi (76.42 km^{2})
  - Water: 0 sq mi (0.00 km^{2})
- Elevation: 1,463 ft (446 m)

Population (2010)
  - Total: 915
  - Estimate (2016): 867
  - Density: 29.4/sq mi (11.35/km^{2})
- Time zone: UTC-5 (Eastern (EST))
  - Summer (DST): UTC-4 (EDT)
- FIPS code: 36-58420
- GNIS feature ID: 0979374
- Website: www.townofplainfieldny.org

Plainfield is a town in Otsego County, New York, United States. The population was 915 at the 2010 census.

The Town of Plainfield is located in the northwestern corner of Otsego County.

== History ==
The town was first settled circa 1793, near Plainfield Center.

Plainfield was established from part of the Town of Richfield in 1799.

== Geography ==
According to the United States Census Bureau, the town has a total area of 29.5 square miles (76 km^{2}), all land.

The western town line is marked by the Unadilla River, and is also the county line of Madison County and a small part of Oneida County. The Unadilla River splits into the East and West Branches at Unadilla Forks.

New York State Route 51 is a north–south highway in the eastern part of the town.

== Demographics ==
Historical population
Census	Pop.	Note	%±
1820	1,611		—
1830	1,626		0.9%
1840	1,450		−10.8%
1850	1,450		0.0%
1860	1,354		−6.6%
1870	1,248		−7.8%
1880	1,195		−4.2%
1890	1,025		−14.2%
1900	897		−12.5%
1910	844		−5.9%
1920	791		−6.3%
1930	707		−10.6%
1940	670		−5.2%
1950	729		8.8%
1960	764		4.8%
1970	742		−2.9%
1980	847		14.2%
1990	850		0.4%
2000	986		16.0%
2010	915		−7.2%
2016 (est.)	867		−5.2%
U.S. Decennial Census

As of the census of 2000, there were 986 people, 355 households, and 266 families residing in the town. The population density was 33.5 inhabitants per square mile (12.9/km^{2}). There were 406 housing units at an average density of 13.8 per square mile (5.3/km^{2}). The racial makeup of the town was 98.48% White, 0.41% African American, 0.20% Asian, and 0.91% from two or more races. Hispanic or Latino people of any race were 0.61% of the population.

There were 355 households, out of which 42.0% had children under the age of 18 living with them, 60.8% were married couples living together, 8.5% had a female householder with no husband present, and 24.8% were non-families. 20.8% of all households were made up of individuals, and 7.9% had someone living alone who was 65 years of age or older. The average household size was 2.78 and the average family size was 3.14.

The median age in the town was 34 years. 31.3% of the population was under the age of 18; 5.0% were aged from 18 to 24; 31.6%, from 25 to 44; 21.2%, from 45 to 64; and 10.9% were 65 years of age or older. For every 100 females, there were 102.0 males. For every 100 females age 18 and over, there were 102.7 males.

The median income for a household in the town was $34,500, and the median income for a family was $36,667. Males had a median income of $28,188 versus $21,181 for females. The per capita income for the town was $14,768. About 9.0% of families and 12.4% of the population were below the poverty line, including 15.1% of those under age 18 and 12.8% of those age 65 or over.

== Communities and locations in Plainfield ==
- Huntley Corners – a hamlet near the eastern town line on NY-51
- Leonardsville – a hamlet located at the Unadilla River, and mostly in Madison County
- Lloydsville – a hamlet near the Unadilla River
- Mount Markham – an elevation near Unadilla Forks
- Noahs Rump – an elevation in the southeastern part of Plainfield
- Plainfield Center – A hamlet in the northern part of Plainfield. It is the site of a Welsh colony, which maintained a church for services in Welsh.
- Spooners Corners – A location in the northeastern part of Plainfield at the intersection of NY-51 and Skaneateles Turnpike. The name comes from early settler Ruggles Spooner.
- Unadilla Forks – a hamlet in the northwestern section of Plainfield, at the Unadilla River
- Welch Hill – an elevation located east of Noahs Rump
