= New York's 116th State Assembly district =

American legislative district

Assemblymember
Scott Gray; R–Watertown

New York's 116th State Assembly district is one of the 150 districts in the New York State Assembly. It has been represented by Scott Gray since 2023.

== Geography ==
=== 2020s ===
District 116 contains portions of St. Lawrence and Jefferson counties. It largely borders the St. Lawrence River, hence the district being colloquially called the "River District".

The district contains the cities of Ogdensburg and Watertown, as well as the towns of Alexandria, Antwerp, Brownville, Canton, Cape Vincent, Clayton, Hammond, Lisbon, Louisville, Oswegatchie, Morristown, Orleans, Pamelia, Madrid, Massena, De Peyster, Lyme, Hounsfield, Henderson, Rossie, Theresa, Philadelphia, Potsdam, Waddington, and Watertown.

The district is entirely within New York's 21st congressional district, as well as the 45th and 49th districts of the New York State Senate.

=== 2010s ===
The district contains the cities of Ogdensburg and Watertown, as well as the towns of Alexandria, Antwerp, Brownville, Canton, Cape Vincent, Clayton, Hammond, Lisbon, Louisville, Oswegatchie, Morristown, Orleans, Pamelia, Massena, De Peyster, Lyme, Hounsfield, Henderson, Rossie, Theresa, Philadelphia, Potsdam, Waddington, and Watertown.

== Recent election results ==
=== 2026 ===
2026 New York State Assembly election, District 116
Party	Candidate	Votes	%
Republican	Scott Gray		
Conservative	Scott Gray		
Total	Scott Gray (incumbent)		
Write-in			
Total votes			

=== 2024 ===
2024 New York State Assembly election, District 116
Party	Candidate	Votes	%
Republican	Scott Gray	37,413	
Conservative	Scott Gray	6,259	
Total	Scott Gray (incumbent)	43,672	99.3
Write-in		315	0.7
Total votes		43,987	100.0
Republican hold			

=== 2022 ===
2022 New York State Assembly election, District 116
Primary election
Party	Candidate	Votes	%
Republican	Scott Gray	3,473	53.0
Republican	Susan Duffy	3,069	46.9
Write-in		8	0.1
Total votes		6,551	100.0
General election
Republican	Scott Gray	25,288	70.3
Conservative	Susan Duffy	10,586	29.4
Write-in		108	0.3
Total votes		35,982	100.0
Republican hold			

=== 2020 ===
2020 New York State Assembly election, District 116
Party	Candidate	Votes	%
Republican	Mark Walczyk	29,144	
Conservative	Mark Walczyk	2,790	
Independence	Mark Walczyk	1,089	
Total	Mark Walczyk (incumbent)	33,023	62.8
Democratic	Alex Hammond	19,603	37.2
Write-in		19	0.0
Total votes		52,645	100.0
Republican hold			

=== 2018 ===
2018 New York State Assembly election, District 116
Party	Candidate	Votes	%
Republican	Mark Walczyk	18,259	
Conservative	Mark Walczyk	1,804	
Independence	Mark Walczyk	802	
Reform	Mark Walczyk	133	
Total	Mark Walczyk	20,998	53.2
Democratic	Addie Jenne	17,326	
Working Families	Addie Jenne	1,089	
Total	Addie Jenne (incumbent)	18,415	46.7
Write-in		28	0.1
Total votes		39,441	100.0
Republican gain from Democratic			

=== 2016 ===
2016 New York State Assembly election, District 116
Primary election
Party	Candidate	Votes	%
Republican	John Byrne	1,848	42.2
Republican	William Sheridan	1,798	41.1
Republican	Russell Finley	732	16.7
Write-in		0	0.0
Total votes		4,378	100
General election
Democratic	Addie Jenne	22,165	
Working Families	Addie Jenne	2,308	
Total	Addie Jenne (incumbent)	24,473	53.2
Republican	John Byrne	18,412	
Conservative	John Byrne	1,989	
Independence	John Byrne	988	
Reform	John Byrne	120	
Total	John Byrne	21,509	46.7
Write-in		52	0.1
Total votes		46,034	100.0
Democratic hold			

=== 2014 ===
2014 New York State Assembly election, District 116
Primary election
Party	Candidate	Votes	%
Republican	John Byrne	2,475	66.1
Republican	John Humphrey	1,103	29.5
Republican	Russell Finley	151	4.0
Write-in		13	0.4
Total votes		3,742	100
Conservative	Russell Finley	68	48.9
Conservative	John Byrne	59	42.5
Conservative	John Humphrey	10	7.2
Conservative	John Finley	1	0.7
Conservative	John Bry	1	0.7
Write-in		0	0.0
Total votes		139	100
General election
Democratic	Addie Jenne	13,227	
Working Families	Addie Jenne	1,440	
Total	Addie Jenne (incumbent)	14,667	47.7
Republican	John Byrne	13,408	
Independence	John Byrne	1,164	
Total	John Byrne	14,572	47.3
Conservative	Russell Finley	1,529	5.0
Write-in		11	0.0
Total votes		30,779	100.0
Democratic hold			

=== 2012 ===
2012 New York State Assembly election, District 116
Party	Candidate	Votes	%
Democratic	Addie Jenne	28,018	
Working Families	Addie Jenne	5,311	
Total	Addie Jenne (incumbent)	33,329	99.6
Write-in		138	0.4
Total votes		33,467	100.0
Democratic hold			
