= Frederick C. Winkler =

19th century American lawyer, politician, and Union Army officer

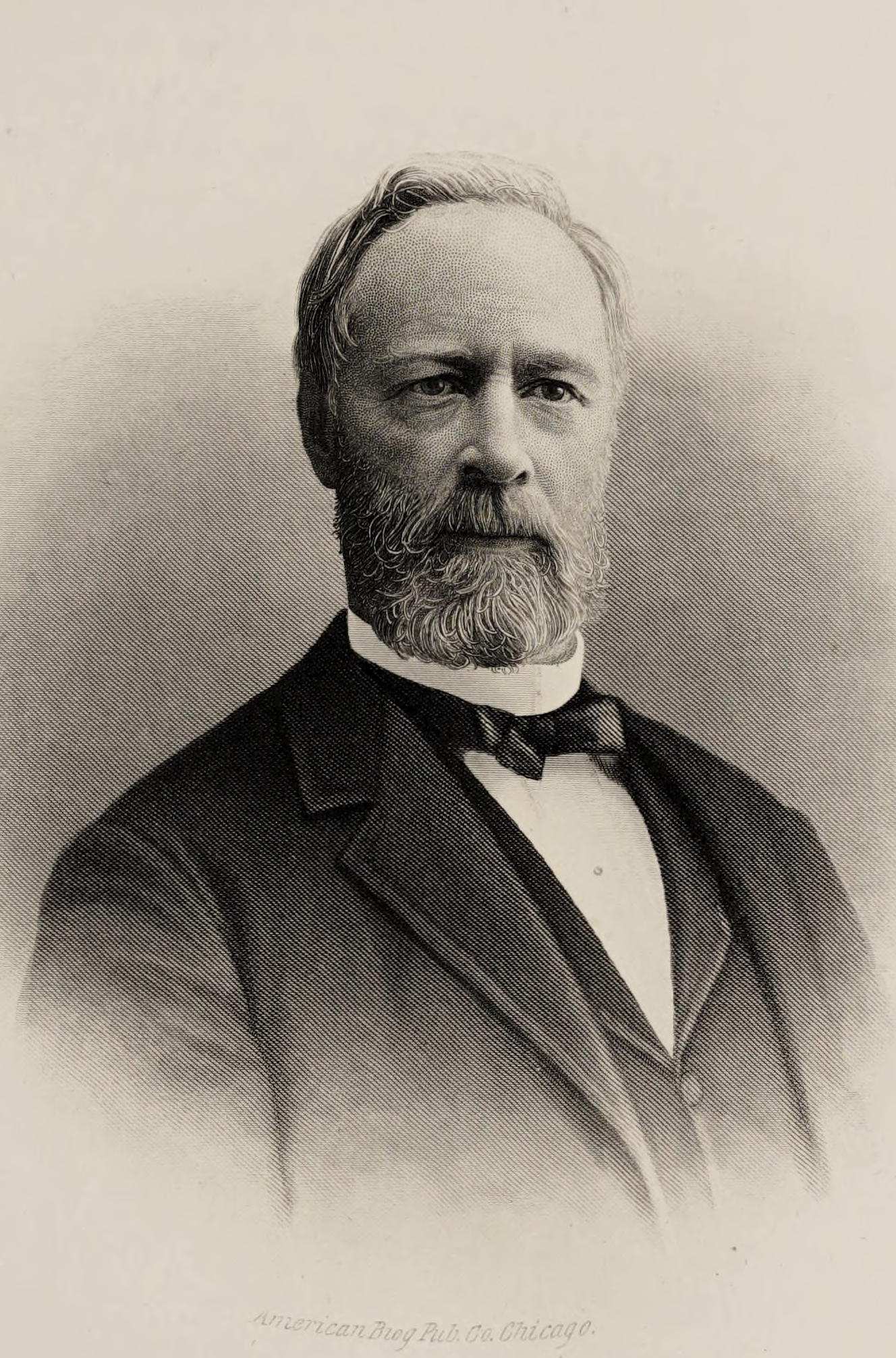
- From History of the Bench and Bar of Wisconsin (1898)

Member of the Wisconsin State Assembly from the Milwaukee 4th district
- In office January 1, 1872 – January 1, 1873
- Preceded by: Charles M. Hoyt
- Succeeded by: Gottlob E. Weiss

Personal details
- Born: Frederick Carl Winkler; March 15, 1838 Bremen, German Confederation
- Died: March 22, 1921 (aged 83) Los Angeles, California, U.S.
- Resting place: Forest Home Cemetery; Milwaukee, Wisconsin
- Party: Republican
- Spouses: Frances M. Wightman; (m. 1864; died 1916)
- Children: 6 daughters; 3 sons
- Parents: Carl Winkler (father); Elizabeth (Overbeck) Winkler (mother)
- Profession: lawyer
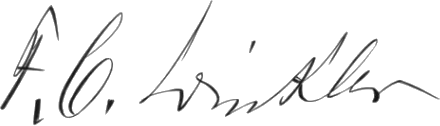
- Signature

Military service
- Allegiance: United States
- Branch/service: United States Volunteers; Union Army
- Years of service: 1861–1865
- Rank: Lt. Colonel, USV; Brevet Brig. General, USV
- Commands: 26th Reg. Wis. Vol. Infantry
- Battles/wars: American Civil War; Gettysburg campaign; Battle of Gettysburg; Atlanta campaign; Savannah campaign; Carolinas campaign

Frederick Carl Winkler (March 15, 1838 – March 22, 1921) was a German American immigrant, lawyer, and Wisconsin pioneer. He was a member of the Wisconsin State Assembly, representing the city of Milwaukee's west side during the 1872 session. He also served as a Union Army officer in the American Civil War and received an honorary brevet to brigadier general.

== Early life and education ==
Winkler was born on March 15, 1838, in the Free City of Bremen, in the German Confederation. As a child, in 1844, he emigrated to the United States with his mother. His father had gone ahead of them a year earlier. He was raised and educated in Milwaukee, and received private tutoring from noted educator Peter Engelmann.

At age 18, he began to study law in the office of attorney Henry L. Palmer, while teaching school in the winters to bring in money. In 1858, he was hired as a clerk in the law offices of Abbott, Gregory, and Pinney, in Madison, Wisconsin, where he completed his legal studies. He was admitted to the bar in April 1859, and then returned to Milwaukee to begin his career.

== Civil War service ==
While studying the law, Winkler became a fervent abolitionist and campaigned extensively for Abraham Lincoln in the 1860 United States presidential election.

Immediately after the outbreak of the war, his law partner entered the Union Army cavalry and left the entire business in Winkler's hands. As the urgency of the war ramped up in 1862, Winkler chose to shut down the business entirely and began organizing a company of volunteers for a new regiment. He gathered a full company of recruits and was elected their captain. His company was organized as Company B of the 26th Wisconsin Infantry Regiment—a regiment composed almost entirely of German American immigrants.

The regiment marched east to join the Army of the Potomac in the eastern theater of the war. They arrived in Virginia in October 1862 and marched to the vicinity of Fredericksburg, arriving just after the battle there.

The army went into winter quarters, and Winkler spent most of that winter detached from his regiment, serving as a judge advocate at the headquarters of XI Corps and working as an aide to General Franz Sigel. At the start of the spring campaign, Winkler was assigned to the staff of General Carl Schurz, the division commander. He was with Schurz through Chancellorsville and into the first day of the Battle of Gettysburg. His regiment had lost their colonel due to a wound at Chancellorsville, and in the first day of Gettysburg both the lieutenant colonel and major were also badly wounded. Winkler resigned from the staff of General Schurz to return to his regiment and assist in leading it through the remaining days of the Battle of Gettysburg.

After Gettysburg, the regiment was badly decimated by casualties and had to be reorganized into just five companies. They were transferred with the rest of XI Corps to the western theater of the war after the disastrous Battle of Chickamauga. Their colonel briefly rejoined the regiment, but he was forced to depart due to his lingering wounds in November 1863, leaving Winkler in command. He was officially promoted to major that month.

Winkler led the regiment in the victory at the Battle of Missionary Ridge. Afterward, the regiment was reorganized into XX Corps and received 417 new recruits and recuperated veterans.

That Winter, Winkler briefly resumed his judge advocate duties to represent General Schurz in an inquiry over his performance at the Battle of Wauhatchie. Schurz believed he had been slandered by General Hooker's account of the battle, and appointed Winkler to represent his interests in a court of inquiry. Winkler succeeded in exonerating Schurz and proving his version of events.

While leading his regiment through the Atlanta campaign, he was promoted to lieutenant colonel in June 1864. Winkler and his regiment received a notable commendation in report of the Battle of Peachtree Creek. Their brigade commander James Wood wrote:

Where all behaved well it may be regarded as invidious to call attention to individuals, yet it seems to me that I cannot discharge my whole duty in this respect without pointing out for special commendation the conduct of the Twenty-sixth Wisconsin Volunteer Infantry and its brave and able commander. The position of this regiment in the line was such that the brunt of the attack on this brigade fell upon it. The brave, skillful, and determined manner in which it met this attack, rolled back the onset, pressed forward in a countercharge, and drove back the enemy, could not be excelled by the troops in this or any other army, and is worthy of the highest commendation and praise. It is to be hoped that such conduct will be held up as an example for others, and will meet its appropriate reward.

— Report of Col. James Wood, Jr., One hundred and thirty-sixth New York Infantry, commanding Third Brigade
Hdqrs. Third Brig., Third Div., 20th Corps, Atlanta, Ga., September 23, 1864

Winkler was designated for promotion to colonel in August 1864, but he never received a federal commission at that rank. He led his regiment through Sherman's March to the Sea in the Fall of 1864, then returned to Wisconsin during that winter to recruit additional manpower for his regiment. While in Wisconsin that Winter, he married Frances M. Wightman. He returned to the regiment in the spring and led them through the Carolinas campaign and the close of the war. They participated in the Grand Review of the Armies in May 1865, and then returned to Milwaukee, where the regiment was disbanded.

After the war, Winkler was granted two honorary brevet ranks—to colonel and then to brigadier general. His nomination for brigadier general was submitted by President Andrew Johnson on January 13, 1866, and was confirmed by the United States Senate on March 12, 1866.

== Postbellum career ==
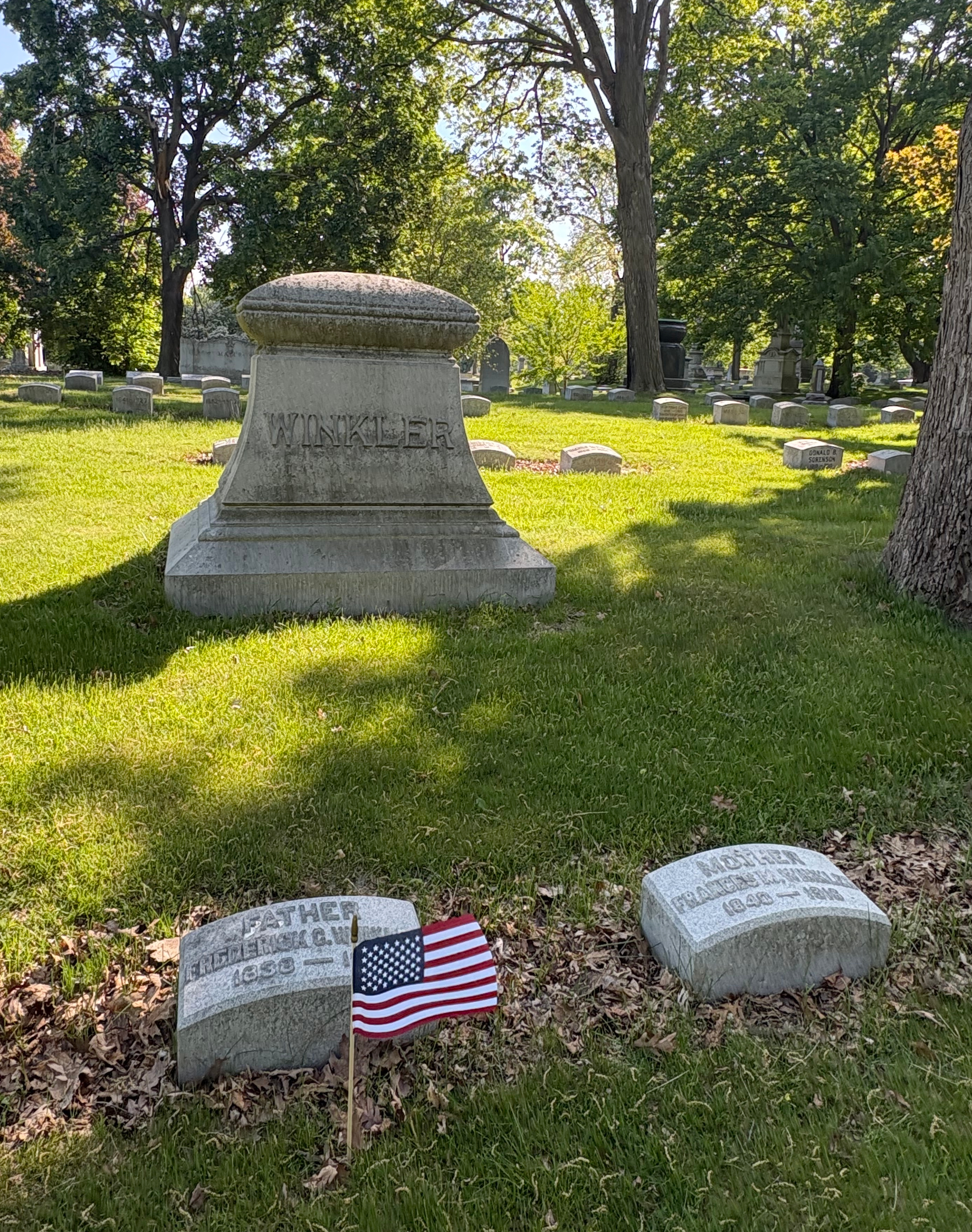
Winkler's grave at Forest Home Cemetery

Returning from the war, Winkler resumed his legal career and, in 1867, formed a partnership with Ammi R. Butler. He was elected to the Wisconsin State Assembly in 1871, running on the Republican Party ticket. He represented Milwaukee County's 4th Assembly district in the 1872 session, which then comprised just the 4th ward of the city of Milwaukee—at that time, it was a strip of Milwaukee's west side, north of the Menomonee River. He was offered an appointment as United States Attorney by President Ulysses S. Grant in 1875, but turned down the offer due to the demands of his extensive legal practice.

For fifty years, he was one of Wisconsin's foremost attorneys and a prominent leader in the Republican Party of Wisconsin. He led Wisconsin's delegation to the 1880 Republican National Convention and played a key role in the nomination of James A. Garfield. He was also a long-time trustee of the Northwestern Mutual Life Insurance Company and served on the finance and executive committees of that company.

He died on March 22, 1921, in Los Angeles, California, and is buried in Milwaukee's historic Forest Home Cemetery.

== Personal life and family ==
Frederick C. Winkler was one of at least three children of Carl Winkler and Elizabeth (née Overbeck). His younger brother, August Gotlieb Winkler, moved to Greenville, Alabama, where he was a prosperous merchant and served on the city council.

Frederick Winkler married Frances M. Wightman in 1864. They had six daughters and three sons.

== Electoral history ==
=== Wisconsin Assembly (1871) ===
Wisconsin Assembly, Milwaukee 4th District Election, 1871
Party	Candidate	Votes	%	±%
General Election, November 7, 1871
Republican	Frederick C. Winkler	591	55.97%	+10.18%
Democratic	Gottlob E. Weiss	465	44.03%	
Plurality		126	11.93%	+3.49%
Total votes		1,056	100.0%	-22.52%
Republican gain from Democratic				

Military offices
Preceded by Col. William H. Jacobs	Command of the 26th Wisconsin Infantry Regiment; November 8, 1863 – June 13, 1865	Regiment abolished
Wisconsin State Assembly
Preceded by Charles M. Hoyt	Member of the Wisconsin State Assembly from the Milwaukee 4th district January 1, 1872 – January 1, 1873	Succeeded by Gottlob E. Weiss
