= Shirley Winters =

American murderer

- Born: February 27, 1958 (age 68); New York
- Conviction: First degree manslaughter (2 counts)

Details
- Victims: 2–7
- Span of crimes: 1979 – November 28, 2006
- Country: United States
- State: New York
- Date apprehended: March 2007

Shirley Winters (born February 27, 1958) is a convicted murderer, arsonist, and suspected serial killer from upstate New York. In 1980, she smothered her five-month-old son, Ronald Winters III. In 2007, she drowned 23-month-old Ryan Rivers. She is also suspected of killing three siblings in childhood, setting a fire which killed two of her older children in 1979, and on the day prior to that killed a friend's three children. Per a plea bargain, she cannot be prosecuted for those.

== Early life ==
In 1966, Winters' 10-year-old brother and 4 and 11-year-old sisters died from an apparent carbon monoxide leak in the family home.

In 1979, Winters' first two children, 3-year-old Colleen and 20-month-old John, died in a fire in the family's Hyde Lake cabin in Theresa, New York. Investigators blamed an electrical defect. When her children's bodies were exhumed in March 2007, autopsies showed Colleen and John received blunt force head injuries before the fire had started.

The day before the fire started at Winters' cabin, another fire started at Winters' friend's house in Hermon, New York, while her friend's three children were still inside. St. Lawrence County police re-investigated this fire in 2007.

Winters was near at least seventeen fires since the 1979 ones, nine determined as arson. She pleaded guilty to criminal mischief in relation to two in 1981. A November 12, 1989, fire started in a Syracuse home where Winters was staying with her three children. She rescued her four-year-old daughter and two-year-old son, but lost her five-year-old daughter, who rescued herself.

== Murders ==
On November 28, 2006, Ryan Rivers was found to be drowned at his grandparents' Pierrepont home, while Winters visited. She was indicted by a St. Lawrence County grand jury in August 2007 of second-degree murder, first-degree assault and endangering the welfare of a child.

This prompted police to exhume Winters' son, Ronald Winters III, who died on November 21, 1980, in Otisco, New York, of supposed sudden infant death syndrome. Based on their findings, police charged Winters with second-degree murder on March 28, 2007.

On April 21, 2008, Winters pleaded guilty to first degree manslaughter for drowning Rivers. Under the terms of the plea agreement, she also agreed to plead guilty in Onondaga County Court to first degree manslaughter for smothering Winters. She was sentenced to 20 years for Rivers, and 8 to 25 years for Winters, to be served concurrently, with parole eligibility after 17 years. She was imprisoned at Bedford Hills Correctional Facility By pleading guilty, she avoided possible second degree murder convictions and multiple life sentences, as well as prosecution for the 1979 murders of Colleen and John Winters. In May 2024, Winters was released from prison and sent to a psychiatric facility.

== In media ==
Winters and her many crimes were featured on episode 8, "A Trail Of Ashes & Bodies in Otisco, New York," of the podcast Small Town Murder.

A book that closely resembles the case and investigation into Winters was published under the title Teflon Shelly, written by Ron Ryan, Fire Investigator of the Onondaga County Department of Emergency Management and Chief of the Volunteer Fire Department, who worked on the case.
