= Lost Village, New York =

Historical site in Upstate NY

Coordinates: 44°37′10″N 75°29′33″W

Lost Village is an unincorporated community in Oswegatchie, New York, in the northern part of St. Lawrence County. It is located on the Oswegatchie River, near where it meets Black Lake. The site is less than a mile east of Galilee, and is about 4 mi (6.4 km) south of Ogdensburg.

== Indigenous origins ==
Lost Village was originally an Indigenous site. In 1910, a prehistoric burial site (including artifacts such as a pendant gorget) was uncovered nearby. During Oswegatchie's early settler period of the 1790s into the 1810s, there was a hunting camp at Lost Village that belonged to the Oswegatchie tribe.

== Lost Village today ==
In the New York State Gazetteer, a register used by the state's Department of Health, Lost Village is recorded as a hamlet, under gazetteer code 4472. Today, the site only consists of a small handful of farms and mobile homes, two cemeteries (the newer Pine Hill Cemetery and the abandoned Sand Road Cemetery), Eel Weir State Park, which includes a stone weir built by the Oswegatchie, a bridge over the Oswegatchie River, and the Eel Weir Dam.
