= Thomas A. Bones =

American politician (1835–1923)

Member of the Wisconsin Senate from the 3rd district
- In office January 1, 1877 – January 6, 1879
- Preceded by: William H. Jacobs
- Succeeded by: William Everett Chipman

Personal details
- Born: November 11, 1835 Theresa, New York, U.S.
- Died: January 1, 1923 (aged 87) Washington, D.C., U.S.
- Resting place: Arlington National Cemetery, Arlington, Virginia
- Party: Republican
- Spouse: Marietta Matilda Wilkins (m. 1881; died 1901)
- Children: Thomas Philip Bones; (b. 1884; died 1951)
- Occupation: Farmer

Military service
- Allegiance: United States
- Branch/service: United States Volunteers; Union Army
- Years of service: 1861–1864
- Rank: Private
- Unit: 1st Bty., Wis. Light Artillery
- Battles/wars: American Civil War

Thomas Arthur Bones (November 11, 1835 – January 1, 1923) was an American farmer, Republican politician, and Wisconsin pioneer. He served two years in the Wisconsin Senate, representing Racine County during the 1877 and 1878 terms.

He was married to the prominent temperance activist and suffragist Marietta Bones.

== Biography ==
Thomas Bones was born in Theresa, New York, in November 1835. As a child, he moved with his parents to Kentucky, where he received his common school education. His family moved to Racine, Wisconsin, in 1852, and Bones attended Racine College there for two years.

During the American Civil War, he volunteered for service in the Union Army, and was enrolled as a private with the 1st Independent Battery Wisconsin Light Artillery. He served three years and mustered out in October 1864.

Bones was elected to the Wisconsin Senate in 1876, running on the Republican Party ticket.

== Personal life and family ==
Thomas A. Bones was the eldest of three sons born to Thomas Bones (1800–1878) and his wife Catherine (née Frey; 1800–1868). His paternal grandfather—also named Thomas Bones—was an Irish American immigrant who served in the 4th Connecticut Regiment during the American Revolutionary War and later became one of the earliest settlers in Philadelphia, New York.

Thomas A. Bones' younger brother, Benjamin Rowland Bones, was a prominent Ornithologist; he married Sarah Doolittle Cutting, a niece of U.S. Senator James R. Doolittle.

Thomas A. Bones married Marietta Matilda Wilkins in 1881 in Washington, D.C. Wilkins was then recently-divorced and brought with her two young sons; they had another son, Thomas Philip Bones, in 1885. Marietta was an activist and social reformer who became prominent in the temperance and women's suffrage movements.

Thomas A. Bones died at his home in Washington, D.C. on January 1, 1923, at the age of 87; he is buried at Arlington National Cemetery.

== Electoral history ==
=== Wisconsin Senate (1876) ===
Wisconsin Senate, 3rd District Election, 1876
Party	Candidate	Votes	%	±%
General Election, November 7, 1876
Republican	Thomas A. Bones	3,555	55.25%	
Democratic	William A. Vaughn	2,879	44.75%	
Plurality		676	10.51%	
Total votes		6,434	100.0%	
Republican gain from Democratic				
