= Theresa, New York =

- Town
- Nickname: "Land of Lakes"
- Location within New York Location within the United States
- Coordinates: 44.2153°N 75.7974°W
- Country: United States
- State: New York
- County: Jefferson

Government
  - Mayor: Scott Mcconnell
  - Town Supervisor: Ryan Schmidt

Area
  - Total: 69.99 sq mi (181.27 km^{2})
  - Land: 65.12 sq mi (168.66 km^{2})
  - Water: 4.87 sq mi (12.61 km^{2})

Population (2020)
  - Total: 2,469
  - Density: 41/sq mi (15.7/km^{2})
- Time zone: EST
  - Summer (DST): EDT
- ZIP Codes: 13691 (Theresa); 13679 (Redwood); 13673 (Philadelphia)
- Area code: 315
- FIPS code: 36-045-73528
- Website: www.townoftheresany.gov

Theresa is a town in Jefferson County, New York, United States. The population was 2,648 at the 2020 census, down from 2,905 in 2010. The town is named after Theresa La Ray, the daughter of an original landowner.

The town of Theresa contains a village also named Theresa. The town and village are in the northern part of the county, north-northeast of Watertown.

== History ==
The history of Theresa begins with the Native American cultures who lived in the area as early as 841 B.C. The first of the Native tribes to inhabit the town of Theresa was a group called the Meadowood Phase, who were early Woodland Indians according to the categorization of Dr. William A. Ritchie. This tribe is believed to be part of the early Adena culture and subsisted on hunting and gathering. Evidence of the tribe existing in the area was found at Muskellunge and Red lakes with finds of weapon points, nets, sinkers, and other various tools from needles to a beaver tooth wood scraper. Later, the Iroquois used the Theresa area as a hunting and fishing ground. Evidence supports that at one point the Iroquois had villages in the surrounding area and used the waterways of Theresa for trade and travel.

The first Europeans to stay in the town were not settlers, but smugglers using the waterways for business. The Indian River was a highway for trade and boat traffic, the obstruction of the high falls notwithstanding. The falls made it necessary for travelers to unload and carry merchandise from the upper to lower level. Smugglers, normally having no time to spare, required the use of two flat-bottom boats. Travelers in less of a hurry also carried their boats to the lower level, but smugglers used a second boat and abandoned the first boat. Many early pioneers found and had free use of the abandoned boats in the early settlement of the town.

The settling of Theresa began January 4, 1800, when David Nelson bought 220,000 acres (890 km^{2}) of land from the Antwerp Land Company. LeRay then subdivided the land for the purposes of settlement and development. By 1810–11, LeRay had erected mills at the falls and brought cattle to graze, but settlement was stunted by the War of 1812. After the war, development continued, and in 1814 LeRay had a bridge built across the river. A year later a dam and mill were built just under the bridge. In 1817, the Shurtliff and Ball families were the first to purchase lots in the town. A year previous to this President Monroe had the Military Road built for frontier protection that connected Theresa and most of the surrounding towns, which helped lead to more settlers coming to the North Country. Following the building of the road, the first taverns were built at West Corners and Chaufty's Corners. LeRay had a gristmill and a tavern built to stimulate the sale of land.

The improvements made by LeRay and others did much to stimulate the growth of the town. Over the next few years, new businesses started to arrive. Within two years of the improvements made by LeRay, Theresa had its first blacksmith shop, brick maker, merchant, and physician. The first school house was built on Sand Hill in 1821. The school was used for a meeting hall more than a school, and a few of the denominations of Christianity used it for a temporary church. The first cemetery was a 1.4-acre (5,700 m^{2}) piece of land donated and laid out by LeRay. The first mail route was a weekly mail delivered on horseback beginning some time in the 1820s. In 1831, a tri-weekly mail run was established. Eighteen years later the first telegraph office was set up, mostly through the efforts of David Berup.

In 1841, the town of Theresa was organized into a separate township from the town of Alexandria, which it had been previously part of. The village of Theresa was incorporated in 1871. In 1859, the first of Theresa's great fires took place. The fire destroyed two houses (one was the first house built in Theresa), three sawmills, one wood-working shop, one iron-working machine shop, and a gristmill. The bridge was also destroyed. Despite the fire in 1859, the town of Theresa was one of the most popular manufacturing and trading hubs in the North Country, even without a railway. The first railway to run through Theresa was the Black River and Morristown Railroad in 1872. In the 1880s, Theresa continued its growth with a population increase of around 1,200 people, and with this new and higher population the businesses grew larger. By this time ordinary precautions were taken to prevent disaster, but nothing was being done to guard against fire. In 1890, the second of the great fires took place. This fire swept through the business district of the town, destroying almost every business in Theresa. The total loss of property was $150,000 with only about $100,000 in insurance. The fire destroyed 40 buildings, but this was somewhat good because it led to the building of more modern and attractive buildings. The fire also gave cause to build a town hall with businesses in the bottom and the upper floor being used for meetings and entertainment. The revenue from the businesses provided enough money for the town to build a village and fire hall and a fire department with some of the best equipment of the day.

In later years, the town started to focus on infrastructure, political, and recreational needs. The first library in Theresa was created in 1900. The Town Board rented some lower rooms in the town hall to the Theresa Library Association for $1 per year. In 1901, the town ordered the building of an iron bridge at Hanson Crossing to replace the failing bridge at the site. Theresa established the Board of Town Fire Commissioners in 1931 and established the Town Fire District, which encompassed the entire town. Six years later, the first U.S. Standard Voting Machines were purchased for the town and the election districts redrawn. As of 1980, both the voting machines and the districts were still being used by the town. In 1975, Theresa received a grant from the E.J. Noble Foundation for a little less than $31,000 and was the first town in the state to receive such a grant. Then, in 1976, a skating rink and warming house were built using funds from the Comprehensive Employment Training Act, Theresa Rotary Club, and the Village and Town of Theresa. Two years later the town purchased 10 acres (40,000 m^{2}) of land to construct a park which would contain the skating rink and then include a tennis and basketball court and other "unforeseen" facilities.

== Geography ==
According to the United States Census Bureau, the town has a total area of 70.0 square miles (181.3 km^{2}), of which 65.1 square miles (168.7 km^{2}) are land and 4.9 square miles (12.6 km^{2}), or 6.96%, are water.

The northeastern town line is the border of St. Lawrence County.

The Indian River flows northeasterly through the town. Most of the northeastern part of the town is covered by lakes or swampland.

New York State Route 26 and New York State Route 37, partially combined, are north-south highways in Theresa. New York State Route 411 is an east-west highway that ends at NY-37, west of Theresa village. NY-411 intersects Interstate 81 at the west town line.

== Demographics ==
Historical population
Census	Pop.	Note	%±
1850	2,342		—
1860	2,628		12.2%
1870	2,364		−10.0%
1880	2,389		1.1%
1890	2,391		0.1%
1900	2,130		−10.9%
1910	2,036		−4.4%
1920	1,762		−13.5%
1930	1,715		−2.7%
1940	1,675		−2.3%
1950	1,660		−0.9%
1960	1,635		−1.5%
1970	1,754		7.3%
1980	1,853		5.6%
1990	2,281		23.1%
2000	2,414		5.8%
2010	2,905		20.3%
2020	2,648		−8.8%
U.S. Decennial Census

As of the census of 2000, there were 2,414 people, 869 households, and 641 families residing in the town. The population density was 36.9 inhabitants per square mile (14.2/km^{2}). There were 1,646 housing units at an average density of 25.2 per square mile (9.7/km^{2}). The racial makeup of the town was 97.14% White, 1.70% Black or African American, 0.25% Native American, 0.25% Asian, 0.12% from other races, and 0.54% from two or more races. Hispanic or Latino of any race were 0.58% of the population.

There were 869 households, out of which 38.1% had children under the age of 18 living with them, 57.8% were married couples living together, 9.0% had a female householder with no husband present, and 26.2% were non-families. 18.9% of all households were made up of individuals, and 6.0% had someone living alone who was 65 years of age or older. The average household size was 2.78 and the average family size was 3.13.

In the town, the population was spread out, with 30.2% under the age of 18, 7.1% from 18 to 24, 32.1% from 25 to 44, 22.9% from 45 to 64, and 7.6% who were 65 years of age or older. The median age was 34 years. For every 100 females, there were 108.5 males. For every 100 females age 18 and over, there were 105.2 males.

The median income for a household in the town was $36,953, and the median income for a family was $39,519. Males had a median income of $29,698 versus $22,841 for females. The per capita income for the town was $17,027. About 14.1% of families and 15.3% of the population were below the poverty line, including 16.9% of those under age 18 and 1.6% of those age 65 or over.

== Notable people of Theresa ==
One of the most notable people of Theresa was the famous highwayman Black Bart. He was born near Moon Lake as either Charles E. Boles or C.E. Bolton. When he was able to strike out on his own he moved to Illinois to join the Union Army during the Civil War. From there he set off to Hannibal, Missouri, where he allegedly left behind a wife and then from there to San Francisco to make a name for himself. While in California Bart began to dine with stagecoach drivers and learned all the movements they made. For eight years he was the "Scourge of Wells Fargo" and committed twenty-seven successful robberies. Bart's downfall was a botched robbery November 3, 1883, when in the commotion he lost a magnifying glass, fieldglass case and a handkerchief that would ultimately lead to his arrest. Bart spent the next four years in San Quentin State Prison for robbery and was released January 23, 1888. After being released Bart vanished and was never seen again. Some people believe that he was paid off by Wells Fargo to stop him from hitting any more coaches, but his disappearance is a mystery.

Another notable figure from the town was a man named Jim Biggers who was a town character and local mystery man. Not much is known about the origin of Biggers. He was a wandering man sleeping where he could find a cave, barn, or tree big enough to support him. The people of town generally liked Biggers and would give him handouts of food and clothing, which he would take gratefully. In the winter he would be seen with multiple pairs of pants and shirts to help him keep warm. Biggers was very wise in the ways of mathematics. He would help anyone with any problem they had and seemed to know the answers by heart. Biggers generally knew the news from the town and world, so shopkeepers would keep an open chair for him to get the information of the day. Biggers also always knew when the big shows were coming to Watertown and would walk all day to see the performances. In his declining years he was taken to a country home until his death.

Roswell P. Flower, born in Theresa in 1835, graduated from Theresa High School and went on to serve as assistant postmaster of Watertown, N.Y. 1854-1860, a Congressman representing New York in the 47th, 51st and 52nd Congresses, and Governor of New York from 1891 until 1895. The Presbyterian Church in Theresa has a plaque and dedication for the Flower family.

Nicholas Doxtater Yost, related by marriage to Governor Flower, traveled from Johnstown, New York, to the Parker Settlement, now called Theresa in 1837, purchased land and settled down. Nicholas' son George, who become a prominent citizen, built a house that survived the great fires of Theresa. The most prominent Yost descendant was United Nations Ambassador Charles W. Yost.

Born in Theresa, Roscoe Drummond (1902–1983) was a political journalist known for his long association with The Christian Science Monitor and a widely syndicated column, "State of the Nation", that he wrote for more than 50 years,

== Communities and locations in Theresa ==
- Bartletts Corners – A hamlet by the southeastern town line, south of Red Lake.
- Butterfield Lake – A lake at the northwestern town line, partly in the town.
- Chapel Corners – A location on County Road 21, by Lake of the Woods.
- Coopers Corners – A hamlet on combined routes NY-26 and NY-37, and County Road 193, west of Theresa village.
- Crystal Lake – A lake near NY-26 by the northwestern town line.
- Douglas Crossing – A hamlet on NY-37, located south of Theresa village.
- Grass Lake – A lake partly in the town and partly in St. Lawrence County.
- Hyde Lake – A lake on the western side of Theresa.
- Indian River – A stream flowing through the town.
- Indian River Wildlife Management Area – A conservation area in the town.
- Lake of the Woods – A lake in the northern part of town, south of Grass Lake.
- Millsite Lake – A lake by the northwestern town line, south of Butterfield Lake.
- Moon Lake – A lake south of Bartletts Corners and Red Lake.
- Muskellunge Lake – A lake near the northeastern corner of Theresa, east of Bartletts Corners.
- Red Lake – A lake by Bartletts Corners and the northeastern town line.
- Rivergate – A hamlet on County Road 46 and the Indian River, south of Theresa village.
- Shurtleff Corners – A location on the southeastern town line on NY-26.
- Sixberry Lake – A lake south of Millsite Lake.
- Stills Corner – A location by the western corner of Theresa.
- Stroughs Crossing – A location on NY-411 in the western part of the town.
- Theresa – A village on the Indian River and NY-26.
