= Theresa (village), New York =

Theresa, New York
- Village
- Location within New York Location within the United States
- Coordinates: 44°13′0″N 75°47′41″W
- Country: United States
- State: New York
- County: Jefferson
- Town: Theresa

Government
  - Type: Village Board
  - Mayor: Jonathan Walker
  - Board of Trustees: Scott McConnell; Jess McMahon; Larry McCrum; Christopher Love

Area
  - Total: 1.32 sq mi (3.43 km^{2})
  - Land: 1.26 sq mi (3.27 km^{2})
  - Water: 0.062 sq mi (0.16 km^{2})
- Elevation: 407 ft (124 m)

Population (2020)
  - Total: 752
  - Density: 595.4/sq mi (229.88/km^{2})
- Time zone: UTC-5 (Eastern (EST))
  - Summer (DST): UTC-4 (EDT)
- ZIP code: 13691
- Area code: 315
- FIPS code: 36-73517
- GNIS feature ID: 2391165
- Website: www.villageoftheresany.gov

Theresa (/θəˈriːsə/, thə-REE-sə) is a village in the town of Theresa in Jefferson County, New York, United States. The population was 863 at the 2010 census. The village is northeast of Watertown.

== History ==
The village was planned as early as 1818 at the high falls on the Indian River. The first business at this location was started in 1820, and a post office was established there in 1822. Theresa was incorporated as a village in 1871.

== Geography ==
According to the United States Census Bureau, the village has a total area of 1.3 square miles (3.4 km^{2}), of which 0.06 square miles (0.16 km^{2}), or 4.64%, are water. The Indian River, part of the Oswegatchie River watershed, flows northward through the village.

The village is located on New York State Route 26 (Main Street and Mill Street) and on County Roads 21, 46, 193, and 194. Route 26 leads northwest 11 miles (18 km) to Alexandria Bay and southeast 6 miles (10 km) to Philadelphia. Watertown, the Jefferson county seat, is 18 miles (29 km) to the south.

== Demographics ==
Historical population
Census	Pop.	Note	%±
1870	798		—
1880	882		10.5%
1890	1,028		16.6%
1900	917		−10.8%
1910	932		1.6%
1920	857		−8.0%
1930	873		1.9%
1940	908		4.0%
1950	925		1.9%
1960	956		3.4%
1970	985		3.0%
1980	827		−16.0%
1990	889		7.5%
2000	812		−8.7%
2010	863		6.3%
2020	752		−12.9%
U.S. Decennial Census

As of the census of 2000, there were 812 people, 308 households, and 211 families residing in the village. The population density was 642.4 inhabitants per square mile (248.0/km^{2}). There were 358 housing units at an average density of 283.2 per square mile (109.3/km^{2}). The racial makeup of the village was 95.44% White, 2.34% Black or African American, 0.37% Native American, 0.62% Asian, and 1.23% from two or more races. Hispanic or Latino of any race were 0.86% of the population.

There were 308 households, out of which 33.4% had children under the age of 18 living with them, 53.9% were married couples living together, 8.8% had a female householder with no husband present, and 31.2% were non-families. 24.0% of all households were made up of individuals, and 7.1% had someone living alone who was 65 years of age or older. The average household size was 2.64 and the average family size was 3.12.

In the village, the population was spread out, with 28.8% under the age of 18, 7.3% from 18 to 24, 30.2% from 25 to 44, 23.8% from 45 to 64, and 10.0% who were 65 years of age or older. The median age was 35 years. For every 100 females, there were 110.4 males. For every 100 females age 18 and over, there were 104.2 males.

The median income for a household in the village was $38,125, and the median income for a family was $44,545. Males had a median income of $32,344 versus $22,250 for females. The per capita income for the village was $18,608. About 11.9% of families and 14.3% of the population were below the poverty line, including 15.5% of those under age 18 and 3.4% of those age 65 or over.

== Education ==
The school district is the Indian River Central School District.
