= Scott Gray =

Scott Gray may refer to:

- Scott Gray (writer), comic book writer from New Zealand
- Scott Gray (rugby union) (born 1978), rugby union footballer
- Scott Gray (motorcyclist), American motorcycle racer
- Scott Gray (politician), American politician
