= Charles Hoyt =

Charles Hoyt may refer to:

- Charles B. Hoyt (c. 1896–1978), American track athlete and coach
- Charles H. Hoyt (1859–1900), American dramatist
- Charles M. Hoyt (1827–1871), American politician
