= Oswegatchie, New York =

- Town
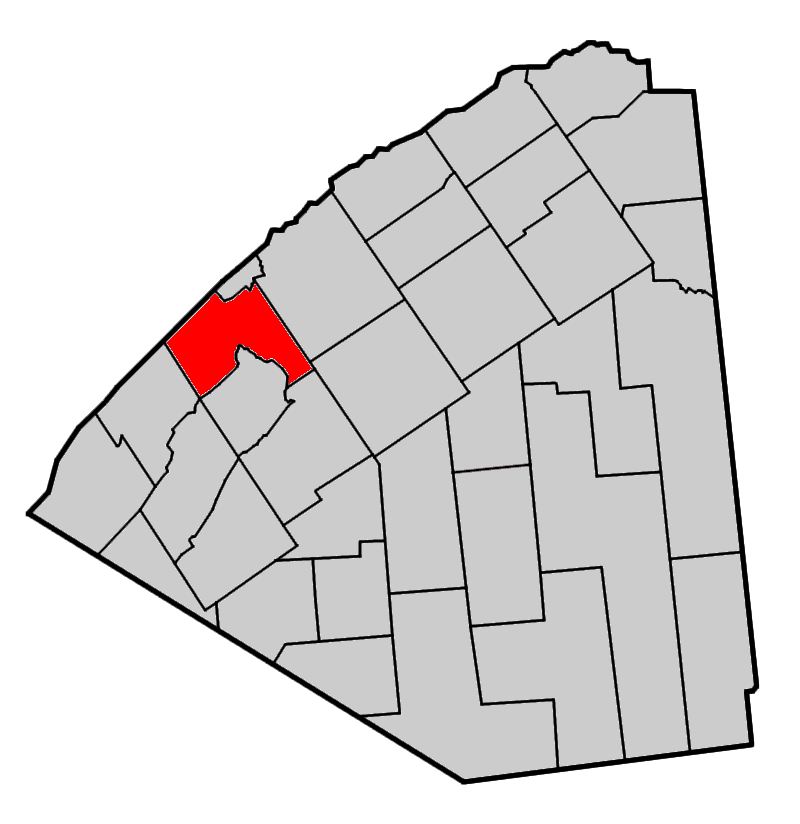
- Map highlighting Oswegatchie's location within St. Lawrence County.

- Location within the state of New York
- Coordinates: 44°37′32″N 75°27′55″W
- Country: United States
- State: New York
- County: St. Lawrence

Area
  - Total: 71.20 sq mi (184.41 km^{2})
  - Land: 65.50 sq mi (169.64 km^{2})
  - Water: 5.70 sq mi (14.77 km^{2})
- Elevation: 282 ft (86 m)

Population (2020)
  - Total: 4,158
  - Density: 66.2/sq mi (25.57/km^{2})
- Time zone: UTC-5 (Eastern (EST))
  - Summer (DST): UTC-4 (EDT)
- FIPS code: 36-55563
- GNIS feature ID: 0979324
- Website: https://www.townofoswegatchie.org/

Oswegatchie is a town in St. Lawrence County, New York, United States. The population was 4,397 at the 2010 census. The name reportedly means "Black Water". It is on the northern border of the county and is adjacent to the city of Ogdensburg.

== History ==
The area was first explored by French missionaries during the 17th century. The town was founded in 1802 from the town of Lisbon upon the formation of the county. After the end of the French and Indian War, the British renamed the former French community of La Gallette as Oswegatchie, the name of the local native tribe. After the end of the American Revolution, the community became Ogdensburg, named for Samuel Ogden, who was a member of a group of land speculators and developers who purchased a large tract of land in the region. During the War of 1812 Ogdensburg and much of the town was captured by British forces. In 1817, the community of Ogdensburg set itself apart from the town by incorporating as a village, and became the City of Ogdensburg in 1868. The Town of Morristown was formed from the western part of Oswegatchie in 1821. Another part was used to make part of the Town of De Peyster in 1825.

Mater Dei College was opened in 1960 and closed in 2001.

== Geography ==
According to the United States Census Bureau, the town has a total area of 71.4 square miles (185 km^{2}), of which, 65.8 square miles (170 km^{2}) is land and 5.5 square miles (14 km^{2}) (7.76%) is water.

The Oswegatchie River flows through the town, defining part of the southern town line. The northwestern town line is defined by the St. Lawrence River, and is an international border with Canada.

New York State Route 812 is a north–south highway. New York State Route 37 is a highway on the south bank of the St. Lawrence River. New York State Route 68 is by the northeastern town line.

== Demographics ==
Historical population
Census	Pop.	Note	%±
1820	1,661		—
1830	3,934		136.8%
1840	5,719		45.4%
1850	7,756		35.6%
1860	10,821		39.5%
1870	3,018		−72.1%
1880	2,881		−4.5%
1890	2,346		−18.6%
1900	2,368		0.9%
1910	2,235		−5.6%
1920	2,156		−3.5%
1930	2,269		5.2%
1940	2,193		−3.3%
1950	2,363		7.8%
1960	2,836		20.0%
1970	3,162		11.5%
1980	3,939		24.6%
1990	4,036		2.5%
2000	4,370		8.3%
2010	4,397		0.6%
2020	4,158		−5.4%

As of the census of 2000, there were 4,370 people, 1,508 households, and 1,091 families residing in the town. The population density was 66.4 inhabitants per square mile (25.6/km^{2}). There were 1,896 housing units at an average density of 28.8 per square mile (11.1/km^{2}). The racial makeup of the town was 98.49% White, 0.30% African American, 0.34% Native American, 0.32% Asian, 0.02% Pacific Islander, 0.02% from other races, and 0.50% from two or more races. Hispanic or Latino of any race were 0.30% of the population.

There were 1,508 households, out of which 35.1% had children under the age of 18 living with them, 58.0% were married couples living together, 9.5% had a female householder with no husband present, and 27.6% were non-families. 20.8% of all households were made up of individuals, and 9.5% had someone living alone who was 65 years of age or older. The average household size was 2.69 and the average family size was 3.09.

In the town, the population was spread out, with 26.1% under the age of 18, 6.2% from 18 to 24, 27.5% from 25 to 44, 23.8% from 45 to 64, and 16.5% who were 65 years of age or older. The median age was 38 years. For every 100 females, there were 91.1 males. For every 100 females age 18 and over, there were 87.1 males.

The median income for a household in the town was $36,700, and the median income for a family was $39,459. Males had a median income of $31,096 versus $23,365 for females. The per capita income for the town was $16,236. About 8.5% of families and 11.6% of the population were below the poverty line, including 15.8% of those under age 18 and 10.3% of those age 65 or over.

== Communities and locations in Oswegatchie ==
- Black Lake – A long, narrow lake partly in the western part of the town, which defines the southern town line.
- Eel Weir State Park – A state park southwest of Ogdensburg.
- Galilee – A hamlet southwest of Ogdensburg on County Road 6.
- Heuvelton – The Village of Heuvelton is in the southern part of the town by the Oswegatchie River and NY-812.
- Ivy Ridge – A former school for "troubled" teenagers located on the former campus of Mater Dei College, located near the St. Lawrence River, west of Ogdensburg.
- Lost Village (Oswegatchie) – Last known location: by Eel Weir State Park on County Road 4. (see below)
- Northrup Corners – A location by the northern town line on NY-68 and County Road 4.
- Ogdensburg – The City of Ogdensburg is at the northern border of the town on the St. Lawrence River.
- Ogdensburg International Airport (OGS) – An airport south of Ogdensburg.
- Wadhams Hall – Formerly "Wadhams Hall Seminary," it is now a retreat and conference center located by the St. Lawrence River, west of Ogdensburg.

The now-defunct hamlet of Lost Village is also listed in the official New York State Gazetteer, maintained and published by the New York State Department of Health, which includes numerous defunct hamlets and towns, some with alternate or archaic spellings.
