= Jacobs, Wisconsin =

- Town
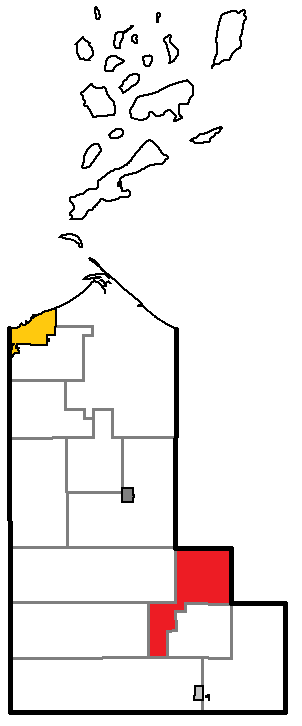
- Location of Jacobs, within Ashland County, Wisconsin
- Coordinates: 46°9′55″N 90°32′5″W
- Country: United States
- State: Wisconsin
- County: Ashland

Area
  - Total: 51.4 sq mi (133.1 km^{2})
  - Land: 51.1 sq mi (132.3 km^{2})
  - Water: 0.31 sq mi (0.8 km^{2})
- Elevation: 1,594 ft (486 m)

Population (2020)
  - Total: 648
  - Density: 12.7/sq mi (4.90/km^{2})
- Time zone: UTC-6 (Central (CST))
  - Summer (DST): UTC-5 (CDT)
- Area codes: 715 & 534
- FIPS code: 55-37775
- GNIS feature ID: 1583446
- Website: https://www.townofjacobs.com/

Jacobs is a town in Ashland County, Wisconsin, United States. The population was 648 at the 2020 census. The unincorporated community of Glidden is located within the town.

== History ==
The Town of Jacobs was named after William H. Jacobs, a German immigrant to Wisconsin who served as the colonel of the 26th Wisconsin Volunteer Infantry Regiment during the American Civil War and as a member of the Wisconsin State Senate from 1876 to 1878.

== Geography ==
According to the United States Census Bureau, the town has a total area of 51.4 square miles (133.1 km^{2}), of which 51.0 square miles (132.2 km^{2}) is land and 0.31 square miles (0.8 km^{2}), or 0.62%, is water.

== Demographics ==
Historical population
| Census | Pop. | Note | %± |
|---|---|---|---|
| 1890 | 1,277 | | — |
| 1900 | 1,270 | | −0.5% |
| 1910 | 1,468 | | 15.6% |
| 1920 | 1,338 | | −8.9% |
| 1930 | 1,195 | | −10.7% |
| 1940 | 1,246 | | 4.3% |
| 1950 | 1,034 | | −17.0% |
| 1960 | 906 | | −12.4% |
| 1970 | 928 | | 2.4% |
| 1980 | 907 | | −2.3% |
| 1990 | 885 | | −2.4% |
| 2000 | 835 | | −5.6% |
| 2010 | 722 | | −13.5% |
| 2020 | 648 | | −10.2% |
U.S. Decennial Census

As of the census of 2000, there were 835 people, 356 households, and 243 families residing in the town. The population density was 16.4 people per square mile (6.3/km^{2}). There were 507 housing units at an average density of 9.9 per square mile (3.8/km^{2}). The racial makeup of the town was 98.44% White, 0.60% Native American, and 0.96% from two or more races. Hispanic or Latino of any race were 0.36% of the population.

There were 356 households, out of which 31.2% had children under the age of 18 living with them, 54.2% were married couples living together, 9.3% had a female householder with no husband present, and 31.7% were non-families. 27.2% of all households were made up of individuals, and 16.6% had someone living alone who was 65 years of age or older. The average household size was 2.35 and the average family size was 2.83.

In the town, the population was spread out, with 25.4% under the age of 18, 6.1% from 18 to 24, 26.1% from 25 to 44, 24.0% from 45 to 64, and 18.4% who were 65 years of age or older. The median age was 40 years. For every 100 females, there were 104.7 males. For every 100 females age 18 and over, there were 95.9 males.

The median income for a household in the town was $25,500, and the median income for a family was $29,545. Males had a median income of $25,682 versus $17,569 for females. The per capita income for the town was $13,579. About 8.3% of families and 11.5% of the population were below the poverty line, including 12.5% of those under age 18 and 13.5% of those age 65 or over.
