= Grass Creek (Black Lake) =

Location
- Country: United States
- State: New York

Physical characteristics
- Source: Grass Lake
- Mouth: Black Lake
  - location: Rossie, New York
  - coordinates: 44°24′17″N 75°39′31″W
  - elevation: 276 ft (84 m)
- Basin size: 10.3 mi^{2} (27 km^{2})

Grass Creek drains Grass Lake and flows north before emptying into Black Lake near Rossie, New York.
