= Lake of the Woods (New York) =

Lake in Chapel Corners, New York

- Location within New York Lake of the Woods (the United States)
- Location: Jefferson County, New York, United States
- Coordinates: 44°18′56″N 75°43′39″W
- Basin countries: United States
- Surface area: 180 acres (0.73 km^{2})
- Average depth: 43 feet (13 m)
- Max. depth: 80 feet (24 m)
- Shore length^{1}: 3.7 miles (6.0 km)
- Surface elevation: 328 feet (100 m)
- Settlements: Chapel Corners, New York
- ^{1} Shore length is not a well-defined measure.

Lake of the Woods is a lake located by Chapel Corners, New York. The outlet flows into the Indian River. Fish species present in the lake are northern pike, lake trout, black crappie, smallmouth bass, rainbow trout, landlocked salmon, whitefish, yellow perch, rock bass, and bluegill. There is a state-owned beach launch on the lake off Cottage Hill Road and there is a 10 horsepower limit.
