= Millsite Lake =

Lake in Jefferson County, New York, United States

- Location within New York Millsite Lake (the United States)
- Location: Jefferson County, New York, United States
- Coordinates: 44°17′28″N 75°46′31″W
- Primary inflows: Sixberry Lake
- Basin countries: United States
- Surface area: 487 acres (1.97 km^{2})
- Average depth: 42 feet (13 m)
- Max. depth: 76 feet (23 m)
- Shore length^{1}: 5 miles (8.0 km)
- Surface elevation: 299 feet (91 m)
- Islands: 7
- Settlements: Chapel Corners, New York
- ^{1} Shore length is not a well-defined measure.

Millsite Lake is located by Chapel Corners, New York. The water from adjacent Sixberry Lake flows into Millsite Lake. Fish species present in the lake are northern pike, largemouth bass, smallmouth bass, lake trout, landlocked salmon, walleye, yellow perch, rock bass, and bluegill. There is a state owned beach launch on the lake off Cottage Hill Road.

== See also ==
- Camp Tousey
