= Red Lake (New York) =

Lake in Jefferson County, New York, United States

- Location within New York Red Lake (the United States)
- Location: Jefferson County, New York, United States
- Coordinates: 44°16′09″N 75°44′10″W
- Primary outflows: Indian River
- Basin countries: United States
- Surface area: 371 acres (1.50 km^{2})
- Average depth: 27 feet (8.2 m)
- Max. depth: 47 feet (14 m)
- Shore length^{1}: 5.8 miles (9.3 km)
- Surface elevation: 305 feet (93 m)
- Settlements: Bartletts Corner, New York
- ^{1} Shore length is not a well-defined measure.

Red Lake is located by Bartletts Corner, New York. The outlet flows into the Indian River. Fish species present in the lake are largemouth bass, smallmouth bass, northern pike, pickerel, walleye, yellow perch, channel catfish, rock bass, bluegill, and black crappie. There is a state owned beach launch on Red Lake Road.
