= Yellow Lake (New York) =

Lake in St. Lawrence County, New York, United States

- Location within New York Yellow Lake (the United States)
- Location: St. Lawrence County, New York, United States
- Coordinates: 44°19′33″N 75°35′56″W
- Primary outflows: Oswegatchie River
- Basin countries: United States
- Surface area: 402 acres (1.63 km^{2})
- Average depth: 4 feet (1.2 m)
- Max. depth: 13 feet (4.0 m)
- Shore length^{1}: 7.3 miles (11.7 km)
- Surface elevation: 341 feet (104 m)
- Settlements: Wegatchie, New York
- ^{1} Shore length is not a well-defined measure.

Yellow Lake is located by Wegatchie, New York. The outlet creek empties into the Oswegatchie River. Fish species present in the lake are largemouth bass, black bullhead, northern pike, rock bass, yellow perch, bluegill, and black crappie. There is a state owned carry down located off Yellow Lake Road.
