= Mark Walczyk =

American politician

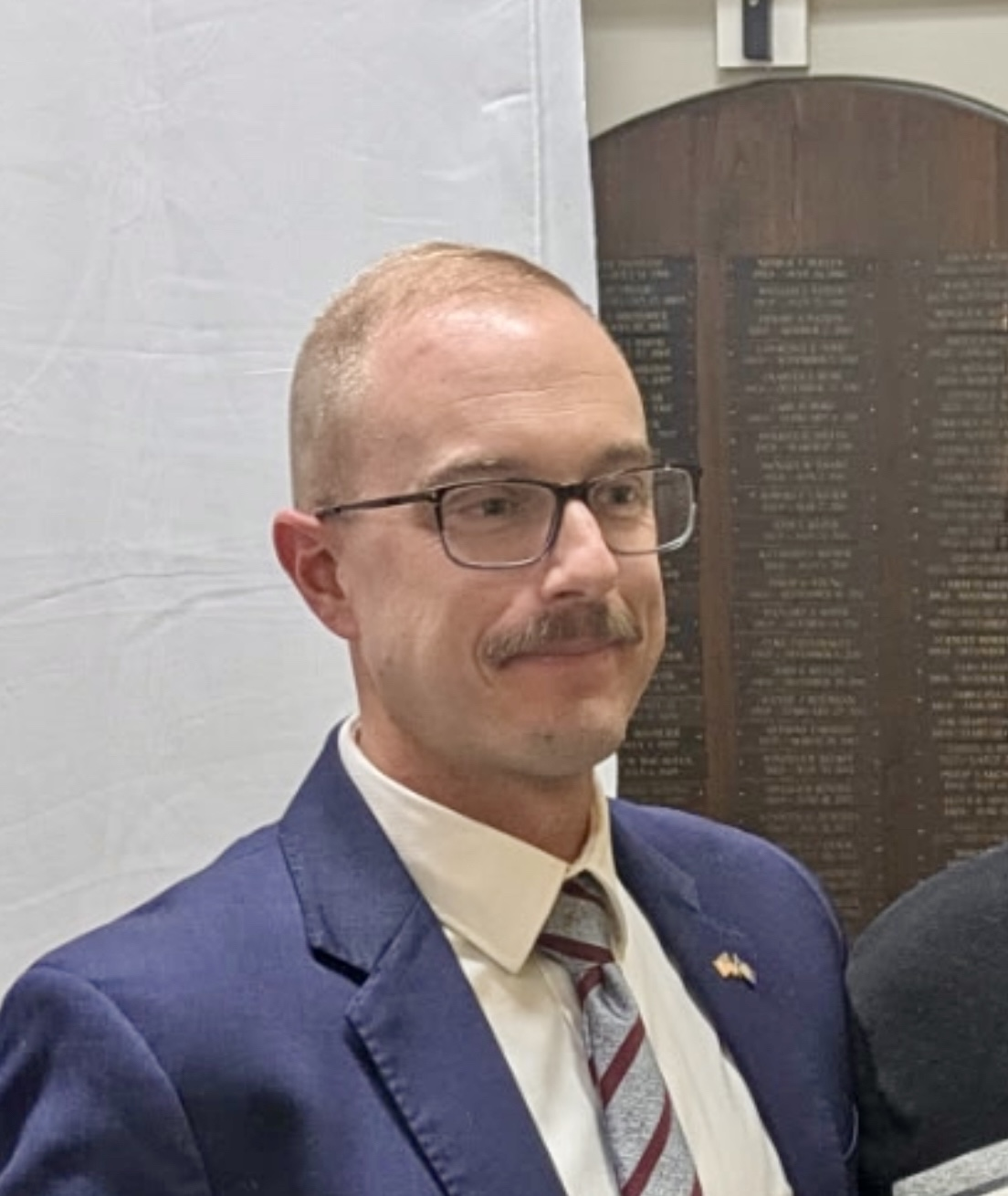
- Walczyk in 2025

Member of the New York State Senate from the 49th district
- Incumbent
- Assumed office January 1, 2023
- Preceded by: Patty Ritchie (redistricted)

Member of the New York State Assembly from the 116th district
- In office January 1, 2019 – December 31, 2022
- Preceded by: Addie Jenne
- Succeeded by: Scott Gray

Personal details
- Born: July 3, 1985 (age 41) Brewerton, New York, U.S.
- Party: Republican
- Spouse: Jessica (m. 2019)
- Education: State University of New York, Albany (BS)
- Website: State Senate website Campaign website

Military service
- Branch/service: United States Army Reserve
- Rank: Captain
- Unit: 484th Forward Engineer Support Team

Mark C. Walczyk (/ˈwɑːlsɪk/; born July 3, 1985) is an American politician and United States Army Reserve officer serving as a member of the New York State Senate for the 49th district since 2023. A Republican, he won the seat in 2022 after serving two terms in the New York State Assembly.

== Career ==
=== Watertown City Council ===
In 2015, Walczyk was elected to the city council of Watertown. His campaign focused on issues such as combating the "drug epidemic,” fixing roads, and rebuilding a pool in Thompson Park. He was sworn in on January 1, 2016.

In 2017, Walczyk was rebuked by mayor Joseph M. Butler and city councilmembers Teresa R. Macaluso and Stephen A. Jennings after he missed the brunt of the city's budget deliberations while on deployment then tried to make changes to it at the last minute. He ultimately did not cast a vote. He served on the council for three years before taking office in the New York State Assembly in 2019.

=== New York State Assembly ===
In 2018, Walczyk that he would run for the New York State Assembly in the 116th district, challening incumbent Democrat Addie Jenne. Walczyk defeated Jenne with in the general election with about 54% of the vote. When running for his second term, Walczyk won against Democrat Alex Hammond 62-37.

=== New York State Senate ===
In 2022, Walczyk announced his campaign for the New York State Senate in the 49th district following incumbent senator Patty Ritchie's retirement. After securing the Republican nomination, Walczyk won the general election unopposed.

==== Tenure ====
Walczyk called on Governor Kathy Hochul to pause the installation of new solar farms in the state following a battery fire at a plant in Jefferson County.

Walczyk has also worked to strengthen tourism and the local agriculture industry in parts of his district. In 2021, Cuomo signed a piece of legislation sponsored by Walczyk that added two wineries in Jefferson County to the Thousand Islands-Seaway Wine Trail.

He criticized the New York State Education Department for releasing guidance that he believed would diminish parental rights. Walczyk and U.S. Representative Elise Stefanik blamed the closure of the Remington Arms factory in Illion on New York’s gun control laws.

Walczyk announced his deployment to Kuwait for nine months starting late January 2024, missing the entire year's legislative session. His office stated that he would not be resigning and that staff would continue handling constituent services in his absence. He returned in December 2024 after serving ten months as a captain of the U.S. Army Reserve 484th Forward Engineer Support Team, overseeing construction projects in the Middle East.

Although he was speculated to be a candidate in the potential 2025 special election following Elise Stefanik's nomination to be Ambassador to the United Nations, Walczyk said he would not run for the seat. In March 2025, Walczyk and other Republican state lawmakers introduced a bill to implement a state-level DOGE, pitched as a bipartisan 'Commission On Government Efficiency' to reduce state spending.

== Personal life ==
Walczyk lives in Watertown with his wife, Jessica. He is a four-time participant in the Ironman Triathlon and an Eagle Scout.

== Military service ==
Mark Walczyk serves as a Captain in the United States Army Reserve, assigned to the 484th Forward Engineer Support Team. In late January 2024, he was deployed to the Middle East, primarily stationed in Kuwait, for what became a 10-month tour of duty. During his deployment, which lasted approximately 290 days, Captain Walczyk oversaw critical construction projects in multiple countries as part of his engineering unit’s mission.

Walczyk announced his deployment in December 2023, informing constituents that he would miss most of the 2024 legislative session while serving overseas.
