= Jabez Pierce =

American politician

Jabez Pierce or Peirce (1806 – ?) was a carpenter and miner from Mineral Point, Wisconsin who served a single one-year term as a Democratic member of the Wisconsin State Assembly for 1849 (2nd Wisconsin Legislature).

== Public office ==
He was elected in 1848 to represent the Southern Iowa County Assembly district, which at that time included the area which would become Richland County, defeating Whig nominee John Carter. He succeeded fellow Democrat Abner Nichols. At the time he took office in the Assembly (January 1849), he was reported as being 42 years of age, a carpenter and miner, from Massachusetts, and as having been in Wisconsin for ten years. He was succeeded in the Assembly by Moses M. Strong, another Democrat.

== Gold rush ==
Pierce is listed as among the prominent residents of Mineral Point who left for California during the California Gold Rush. As of February 6, 1851, he was listed as one of the "Mineral Point Delegation in California", but not among those marked either as "died in California or on the way" or among those who had returned to Mineral Point.
