= Moses M. Strong =

American politician and pioneer (1810–1894)

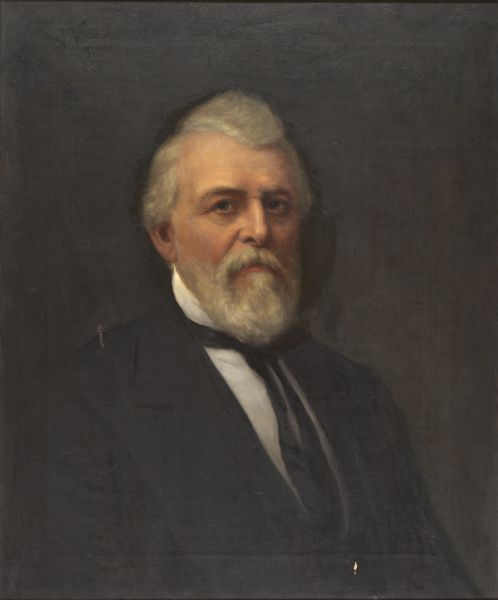

3rd Speaker of the Wisconsin State Assembly
- In office January 9, 1850 – January 8, 1851
- Preceded by: Harrison Carroll Hobart
- Succeeded by: Frederick W. Horn

Member of the Wisconsin State Assembly
- In office January 5, 1857 – January 4, 1858
- Preceded by: Augustus Greulich
- Succeeded by: Alexander Cotzhausen
- Constituency: Milwaukee 2nd district
- In office January 7, 1850 – January 6, 1851
- Preceded by: Jabez Pierce
- Succeeded by: Richard J. Tregaskis
- Constituency: Iowa County district

United States Attorney for the Wisconsin Territory
- In office June 1838 – 1841
- President: Martin Van Buren
- Preceded by: William W. Chapman
- Succeeded by: Thomas W. Sutherland

President of the Council of the Wisconsin Territory
- In office January 6, 1845 – January 5, 1846
- Preceded by: Marshall Strong
- Succeeded by: Nelson Dewey
- In office December 5, 1842 – March 18, 1843
- Preceded by: James Collins
- Succeeded by: Morgan Lewis Martin

Member of the Council of the Wisconsin Territory for Iowa County
- In office December 5, 1842 – January 4, 1847
- Preceded by: James Collins
- Succeeded by: William Singer (Iowa & Richland)

Personal details
- Born: May 20, 1810 Rutland, Vermont, U.S.
- Died: July 20, 1894 (aged 84) Mineral Point, Wisconsin, U.S.
- Resting place: Graceland Cemetery, Mineral Point
- Party: Democratic
- Spouse: Caroline Frances Green (m. 1832–1894)
- Children: (Baby) Strong^{(b. 1842; died 1842)}; George Strong^{(b. 1844; died 1845)}; Moses Strong^{(b. 1846; died 1877)}; Agnes Frances Strong^{(b. 1849; died 1905)}
- Parents: Moses Strong (father); Lucy Maria (Smith) Strong (mother)
- Relatives: Henry H. Conklin (brother-in-law)
- Education: Dartmouth College
- Profession: Lawyer, politician

Moses McCure Strong (May 20, 1810 – July 20, 1894) was an American lawyer, politician, businessman, and Wisconsin pioneer. He was one of the framers of the Constitution of Wisconsin, a member of the territorial legislature, and United States Attorney for the Wisconsin Territory under President Martin Van Buren. After Wisconsin achieved statehood, he was speaker of the Wisconsin State Assembly during the 3rd Wisconsin Legislature (1850).

== Biography ==
Strong was born in Vermont in 1810, the son of Moses Strong, a Vermont lawyer and judge. The younger Strong graduated from Dartmouth College in 1829, received a legal education, and practiced law in Rutland, Vermont.

Strong moved to Mineral Point, Wisconsin Territory, in 1836, where he was appointed deputy land surveyor. When in Wisconsin, he secured an investment of $33,000 for land speculation from three New Hampshire financiers: Senator Henry Hubbard, Horace Hall, and George Olcott. By the end of 1837, Strong had acquired thousands of acres of land throughout the state: forty lots in the future Madison, Wisconsin; land in Dane County on the Wisconsin River which he called "St. Lawrence"; and land in the village of Arena. But when the Panic of 1837 hit, it became impossible to resell any of the land at a profit, and the investors for the most part lost their money.

In February 1837, James Duane Doty hired Strong to survey Madison and stake out the land for the Wisconsin State Capitol.

In June 1838, Strong was selected United States Attorney of the Territory of Wisconsin, and in December was appointed "fiscal agent" for the territory. In 1841, Strong was elected to the Council of the Legislative Assembly of the Territory of Wisconsin, representing Iowa County. He was reelected every year until 1846. His fellow councilmen elected him President of the Council in 1842 and 1845.

In 1846, Strong was selected to represent Iowa County in the first convention to draft a constitution for the future state of Wisconsin. (This draft was rejected by the people in 1847.) The Constitutional Convention's journal recorded Strong's opposition to black suffrage, with Strong noting that he "was a friend to females, and it was for that reason he did not wish to see them tacked on to negroes." Later in the debate, records show "Strong came out in a violent speech in opposition to negro suffrage," saying "that he was teetotally opposed to negro suffrage in any manner or form that could be devised." Strong was selected as the Democratic nominee for the election of a Wisconsin delegate to Congress. He was defeated by John Hubbard Tweedy in the general election, 9,648 to 10,670.

Once Wisconsin became a state in 1848, Strong was elected to the Wisconsin State Assembly for the 1850 session, where he served as Speaker.

In the 1850s, Strong assisted Byron Kilbourn in his efforts to promote the proposed La Crosse and Milwaukee Railroad. Although Strong lived in Mineral Point, Kilbourn arranged to have him elected to the Wisconsin State Assembly in 1857 as a representative for Milwaukee County so that Strong could help convince the state legislature to help out the effort. In the end, Strong became very involved in efforts to bribe legislators. When elected officials attempted to investigate in 1858, Strong refused to testify before legislative committees, and spent six days in jail. The Wisconsin Supreme Court, in In re Falvey, 7 Wis. 630 (1858). rejected his argument that legislative committees do not have the power to issue subpoenas.

In the 1870s, Strong wrote a history of the Wisconsin Territory entitled History of the Territory of Wisconsin from 1836 to 1848. He convinced the state legislature to publish the work in 1885.

In 1878, Strong helped to organize the State Bar of Wisconsin, and was elected its first president. He served in that role until 1893.

Strong died in Mineral Point in 1894. The Wisconsin Magazine of History in 1955 judged that "An independent attitude coupled with a love of gambling, excessive drinking, and a limited business ability combined to keep Strong from reaching his goals."

== See also ==
- List of United States attorneys for Wisconsin

Wisconsin State Assembly
Preceded by Jabez Pierce	Member of the Wisconsin State Assembly from the Iowa County district January 1, 1850 – January 1, 1851	Succeeded by Richard J. Tregaskis
Preceded by Augustus Greulich	Member of the Wisconsin State Assembly from the Milwaukee 2nd district January 1, 1857 – January 1, 1858	Succeeded by Alexander Cotzhausen
Preceded by Harrison Carroll Hobart	Speaker of the Wisconsin State Assembly; January 9, 1850 – January 8, 1851	Succeeded by Frederick W. Horn
Wisconsin Senate
Preceded by James Collins	President of the Council of the Wisconsin Territory; 1842 – 1843	Succeeded by Morgan Lewis Martin
Preceded by Marshall Strong	President of the Council of the Wisconsin Territory; 1845 – 1846	Succeeded by Nelson Dewey
Legal offices
Preceded by William W. Chapman	United States Attorney for the Wisconsin Territory; 1838 – 1841	Succeeded by Thomas W. Sutherland
