= Scott Gray (politician) =

New York politician

Member of the New York State Assembly from the 116th district
- Incumbent
- Assumed office January 3, 2023
- Preceded by: Mark Walczyk

Personal details
- Born: March 7, 1962 (age 64)
- Party: Republican
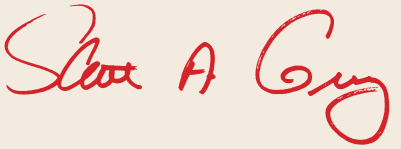
- Signature
- Website: nyassembly.gov/mem/Scott-Gray/

Scott Gray is an American politician from New York. A Republican, he has represented the 116th district of the New York State Assembly since 2023.

== Biography ==
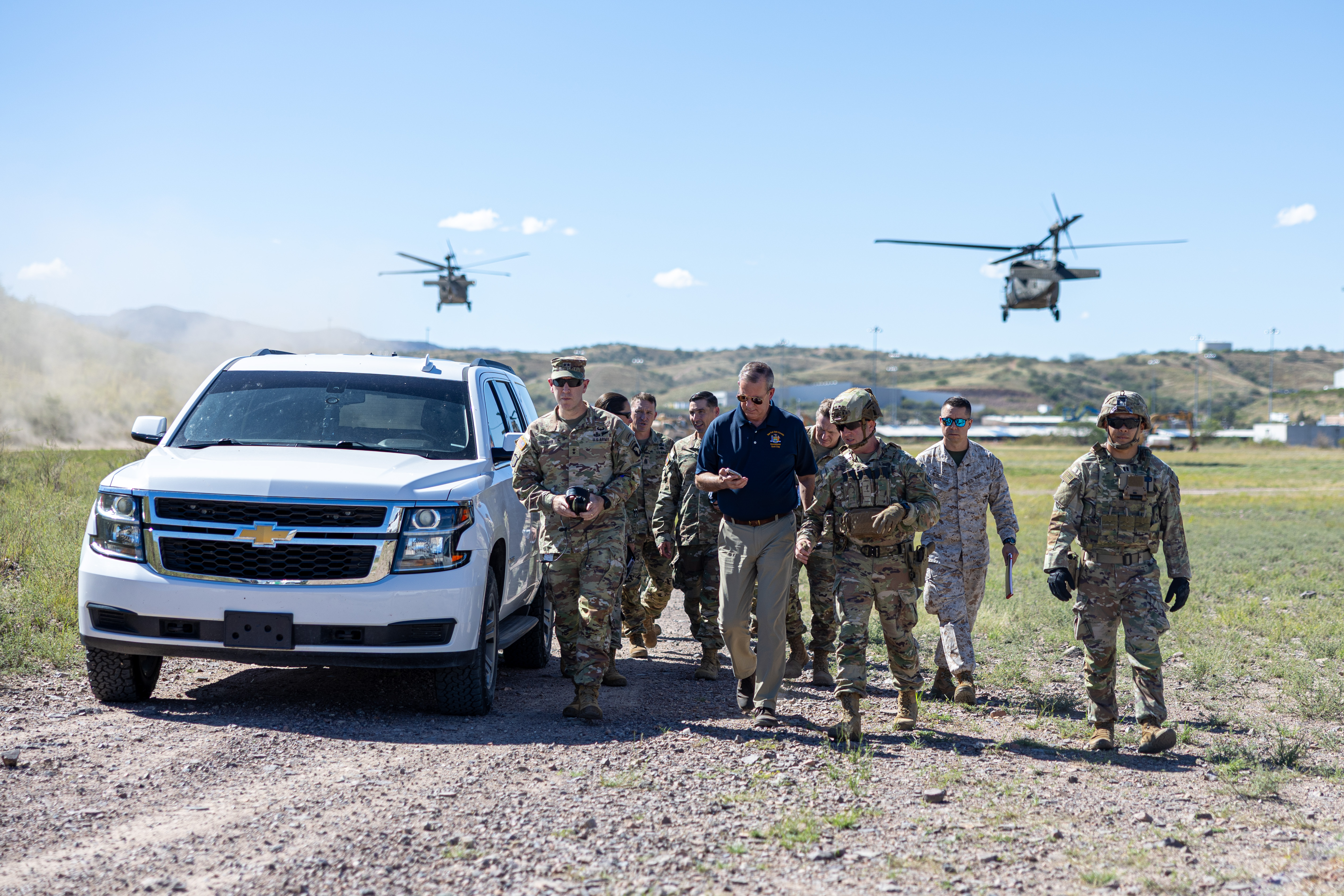
Gray (center) touring the southern U.S. border at Nogales, Arizona on October 3, 2025

Gray is the fourth-generation owner of his family's small business, Gray’s Flower Shop, which is located in his native Watertown. He served 21 years as a county legislator for Jefferson County and six years as the Chairman of the Jefferson County Board of Legislators.

Gray ran for New York State Assembly in 2022. He faced businesswoman Susan Duffy in the Republican primary. Upon Gray's victory, Duffy refused to concede and continued to run for Assembly on the Conservative Party line. The Democrats did not put forward a candidate. Gray went on to defeat Duffy with 70% of the vote to her 30% of the vote in the general election.

Gray was sworn in as a member of the Assembly on January 3, 2023. The first bill that Gray introduced to the Assembly would allow the Ogdensburg Bridge and Port Authority to hire peace officers to work at Ogdensburg International Airport. The bill passed the Assembly in May 2023.

Gray was re-elected in 2024.

== Community involvement ==
Gray has served on the boards of the United Way of North New York and the Carthage Area Hospital Board, respectively. He has received a Public Service Commendation Medal from the United States Secretary of the Army.

New York State Assembly
Preceded by Mark Walczyk	New York State Assembly, 116th District; 2023–	Succeeded by Incumbent
