= Moon Lake (Jefferson County, New York) =

- Location within New York Moon Lake (the United States)
- Location: Jefferson County, New York, United States
- Coordinates: 44°15′09″N 75°44′12″W
- Type: Lake
- Primary outflows: Varoom Creek
- Basin countries: United States
- Surface area: 261 acres (1.06 km^{2})
- Average depth: 12 feet (3.7 m)
- Max. depth: 20 feet (6.1 m)
- Shore length^{1}: 3.8 miles (6.1 km)
- Surface elevation: 390 feet (120 m)
- Islands: 4
- Settlements: Bartletts Corner, New York
- ^{1} Shore length is not a well-defined measure.

Moon Lake is located by Bartletts Corner, New York. The outlet flows into Varoom Creek. Fish species present in the lake are largemouth bass, northern pike, yellow perch, tiger muskie, bluegill, and black crappie. There is a state owned carry down on Moon Lake Road.
