= Camp Tousey =

YMCA summer camp

Coordinates: 44°17′16″N 75°46′9″W

Camp Tousey was a YMCA summer camp located about two miles (3.2 km) from the village of Redwood in Jefferson County, New York in the United States, and about eight miles (13 km) from Alexandria Bay, New York, a small resort town on the St. Lawrence River in the Thousand Islands area. The camp was operated by the Syracuse, New York YMCA for many decades during the twentieth century. Non-Christians were not excluded from the camp and many attended.

The camp comprised 500 acres (2.0 km^{2}) wooded on the shores of Millsite Lake and of Sixberry Lake and also included Royale Island on Millsite Lake, just offshore from the main camp. The terrain was rugged, with a tall rocky cliff backing the buildings of the main camp, clustered along Millsite Lake. Standing atop the cliffs provided an expansive view of the camp and of Millsite Lake.

== Facilities and camp culture ==
Campers resided in rustic cabins with rough bunks. A lean-to on the cliffs above the camp and another on Royale Island provided sites for overnight camping away from the main camp. Two staff members, a senior counselor and a junior counselor or counselor-in-training, lived in each cabin with about ten campers. Counselors were typically older college students while junior counselors and counselors-in-training were high school students or younger college students. Meals were taken together with entire camp in a large mess hall. Activities included water skiing, sailing, canoeing, rowing, riflery, horseback riding, swimming lessons, hiking, road running, softball, baseball, volleyball, lacrosse, basketball, overnight camping, crafts, tether ball, athletic competitions, and campfire ceremonies. Campers were boys ranging in age from eight to fourteen years, and they were grouped by age into three villages, from the youngest Mohawks, to the Cayugas, to the oldest Tuscaroras. Each village consisted of four to eight cabins located in a group. From the mid-1970s, girl campers also attended the camp. The girls were grouped into a new village, the Algonquins.

Camp rituals included bugle calls, group assemblies, and non-denominational Christian chapel and vespers. Evening campfire gatherings would include the telling of ghost stories and group singing accompanied by guitar. Some staff members were talented guitarists. Each campfire gathering would end with the singing of the Camp Tousey Anthem, followed immediately by the singing of Taps.

== History ==
During the 1960s, each summer was divided into four two-week periods, and campers would typically stay for one period, although it was possible to stay for more. Campers and their gear were usually brought by chartered bus from a shopping center parking lot in Syracuse to the camp.

Camp Tousey was abruptly shut down after the summer of 1990. The shut down was blamed on declining registrations at the camp. The Syracuse YMCA sold the property in 1997.
