= Frederick W. Cotzhausen =

American politician (1838–1838 )

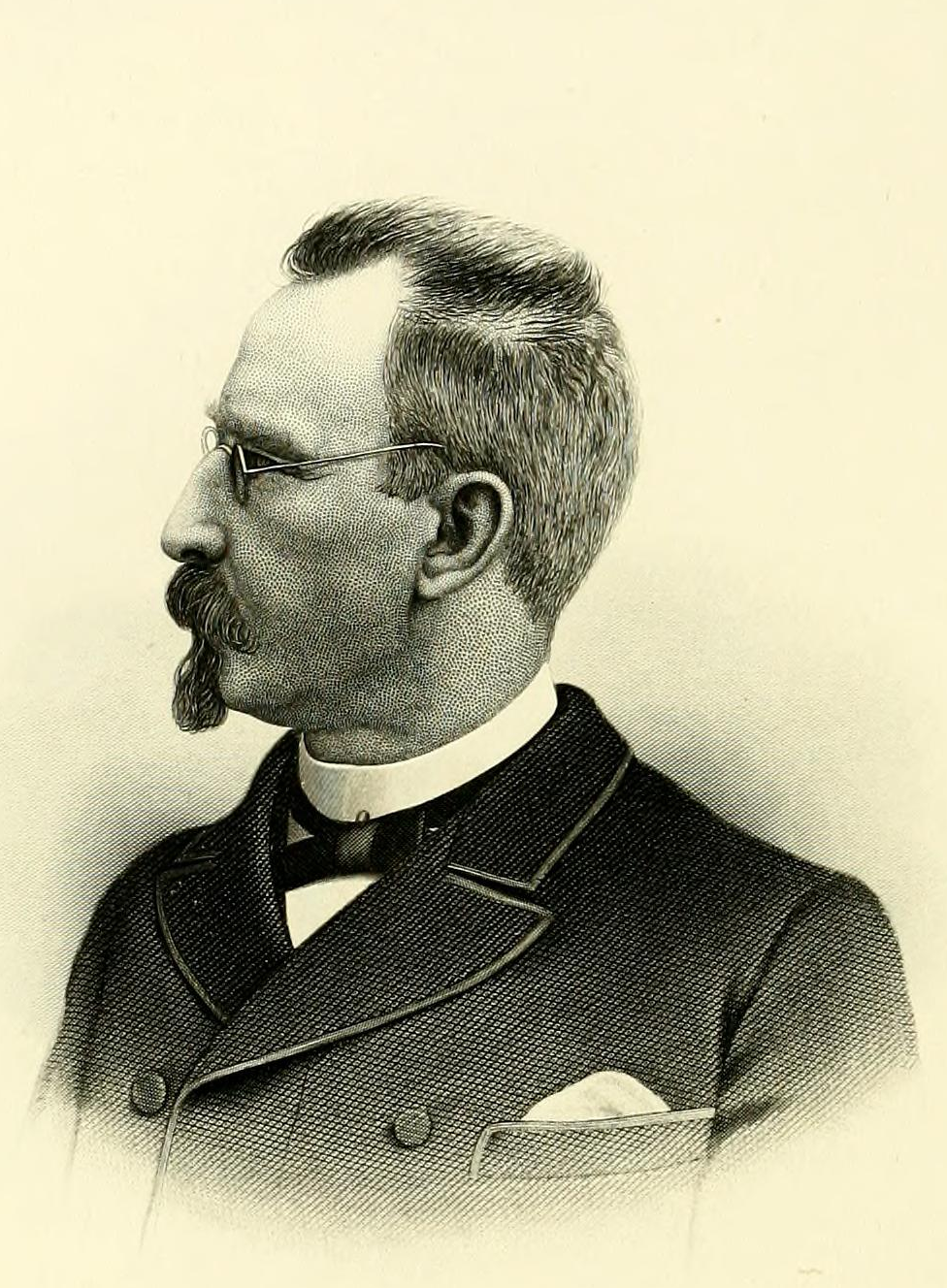
- From History of Milwaukee from its first settlement to the year 1895 (1895)

Member of the Wisconsin Senate from the 3rd district
- In office January 6, 1873 – January 4, 1875
- Preceded by: Francis Huebschmann
- Succeeded by: William H. Jacobs

Personal details
- Born: Ewald Alfred Arthur Frederick William von Cotzhausen; July 21, 1838 Haus Kambach, Rhine Province, Kingdom of Prussia
- Died: December 10, 1924 (aged 86) Greenfield, Wisconsin, U.S.
- Resting place: Forest Home Cemetery, Milwaukee
- Party: Democratic
- Spouse: Maria Sophia Jacobi (m. 1863; died 1917)
- Children: Olga Maria Magdalena (Fischbeck)^{(b. 1864)}; Adolph Hugo "Oswald" Cotzhausen^{(b. 1865)}; Martha (Schwenger)^{(b. 1867)}; Emma Cotzhausen^{(b. 1868)}; Thekla Dorothea Cotzhausen^{(b. 1869)}; Ella (Schinke)^{(b. 1873)}; Friederich Cotzhausen^{(b. 1874)}; Hertha Friedericke Vianda (Martin)^{(b. 1876; died 1957)}; Arthur A. Cotzhausen^{(b. 1878; died 1960)}
- Relatives: Alexander Cotzhausen (brother)
- Profession: Lawyer

Ewald Alfred Arthur Frederick William von Cotzhausen (July 21, 1838 – December 10, 1924) was a German American immigrant, lawyer, and politician. He was a member of the Wisconsin State Senate, representing northern Milwaukee County during the 1873 and 1874 sessions. His name was sometimes abbreviated A. F. W. Cotzhausen or F. W. Cotzhausen.

== Biography ==
Frederick W. Cotzhausen was born Ewald Alfred Arthur Frederick William von Cotzhausen at Haus Kambach, near Aachen, in the Rhine Province of the Kingdom of Prussia. At the time, this castle and estate belonged to his father. As a child, he was given the nickname "Fritz", in honor of his godfather and namesake, Prussian King Frederick William IV.

His father died when he was just four years old, and his education and upbringing fell to his mother. Watching his eldest brother inherit the entire family estate, Frederick realized the necessity to seek his own fortunes. In a 1906 autobiographical essay, he summarized that for his share of the inheritance, he received nothing beyond "a first class academic and collegiate education". From 1847 to 1853, he attended Gustavus Adolphus College in Moers, and then attended a trade school in Cologne. At an anniversary celebration in 1852, he was presented to his godfather, King Frederick William IV. At that time, he was offered a commission in the Prussian Navy, but declined in favor of seeking a collegiate and scientific education.

He emigrated to the United States in 1856, and came to Milwaukee, Wisconsin, where his older brother, Alexander Cotzhausen, was already living. He worked briefly in a mechanic shop before turning his interests to the study of law. He was admitted to the bar in 1859 and ran a successful legal practice in Milwaukee for the next thirty years. In 1870 he was hired as general counsel for a proposed rail line, which eventually became incorporated into the Chicago and North Western company.

He was active with the Democratic Party throughout most of his adult life, but only ran for elected office once. He was elected to the Wisconsin State Senate in 1872, from the 3rd State Senate district, which then comprised roughly the north half of Milwaukee County. He was elected during a rare moment when the Democratic Party held power in state government, but he voted against the signature law of that session, the railroad regulation bill. His most noteworthy contribution from his term in office was a softening of the Graham Liquor Law, which had outraged Wisconsin's German population.

After the Republicans passed the Bennett Law in 1889, requiring English language education, Cotzhausen took a leading role in fomenting outrage in the German community, leading to the Democratic wave elections in 1890 and 1892. But Cotzhausen broke with the Democratic Party over the 1896 nomination of populist William Jennings Bryan, and became a progressive Republican in his later years, endorsing and campaigning for Robert M. La Follette. He was also one of the founders and key organizers of the Milwaukee Municipal League, which encouraged progressive reform in cities around the state and contributed to the growth of La Follette's movement.

By the mid 1890s, he had largely retired to his estate in the town of Greenfield, where he wrote a number of essays about law and politics, largely collected in his Historic Reminiscences and Reflections.

He died at his home in Greenfield on December 10, 1924.

== Personal life and family ==
Frederick Cotzhausen was the youngest son of Heinrich Wilhelm Ludwig Freiherr von Cotzhausen-Wedau with his second wife, Catharina Magdalena Josephina Hubertina (née von Broich). His father acted as president of the College of Electors during the reign of Napoleon, and was created as a baron under the laws of the French Empire. Castle Kambach, where Frederick was born, had been purchased and renovated by their ancestor Johann Bernhard von Cotshausen in 1701, and was passed down to Frederick's father. According to German sources, the estate was sold not long after Heinrich's death in 1842, though the Cotzhausens continued to use the honorific "baron".

Frederick's older brother, Alexander Cotzhausen (Ludwig Alexander Frederich Wilhelm Von Cotzhausen), emigrated to America in 1849 and was a successful businessman and alcohol dealer in Milwaukee, working with the Valentin Blatz Brewing Company. He also served one term in the Wisconsin State Assembly and was clerk of the Wisconsin circuit court for Milwaukee County.

In 1863, Frederick Cotzhausen married Maria Sophia Jacobi, another German American immigrant. They had at least nine children together, though two died young.

Two of Cotzhausen's former homes in Milwaukee are considered historically significant. A home at 1825 N. 2nd Street, in the city of Milwaukee, where he lived during the 1860s, is part of the Brewers Hill Historic District. The mansion he occupied for the last fifty years of his life (then in Greenfield, now within the city limits of West Allis, Wisconsin) is still largely intact at 2855 S. Waukesha Road.

== Electoral history ==
=== Wisconsin Senate (1872) ===
Wisconsin Senate, 3rd District Election, 1872
Party	Candidate	Votes	%	±%
General Election, November 5, 1872
Democratic	Frederick W. Cotzhausen	4,318	68.64%	+2.68%
Independent	W. H. Lindwurm	1,973	31.36%	
Plurality		2,345	37.28%	+5.36%
Total votes		6,291	100.0%	-3.79%
Democratic hold				

== Published works ==
- Cotzhausen, Frederick W. (1906). Historic Reminiscences and Reflections. Wetzel Bros. Printing Co.

Wisconsin Senate
Preceded by Francis Huebschmann	Member of the Wisconsin Senate from the 3rd district January 6, 1873 – January 4, 1875	Succeeded by William H. Jacobs
