= Alexander Cotzhausen =

American politician (1827–1899)

Member of the Wisconsin State Assembly from the Milwaukee 2nd district
- In office January 4, 1858 – January 3, 1859
- Preceded by: Moses M. Strong
- Succeeded by: Charles J. Kern

Personal details
- Born: Ludwig Alexander Frederich Wilhelm Von Cotzhausen; February 2, 1827 Haus Kambach, Rhine Province, Kingdom of Prussia
- Died: July 10, 1899 (aged 72) Milwaukee, Wisconsin, U.S.
- Resting place: Forest Home Cemetery, Milwaukee
- Party: Democratic
- Spouse: Emilie Henriette Catharina Friederike Esch (m. 1851–1899)
- Children: Louisa Magdalena Clara Augusta (Mueller)^{(b. 1851; died 1936)}; Heinrich Ludwig Alexander Friedrich Von Cotzhausen^{(b. 1853; died 1938)}; Laura Mathilda Henriette Emilie von Cotzhausen^{(b. 1857; died 1925)}; Alfred Emil Alexander von Cotzhausen^{(b. 1866; died 1941)}
- Relatives: Frederick W. Cotzhausen (brother); Alexander Mueller (great-grandson)
- Occupation: Businessman, liquor dealer

Ludwig Alexander Frederich Wilhelm Von Cotzhausen (February 2, 1827 – July 10, 1899) was a German American immigrant, businessman, and politician. He served one term in the Wisconsin State Assembly, representing part of the city of Milwaukee during the 1858 session.

== Biography ==
Alexander Cotzhausen was born Ludwig Alexander Frederich Wilhelm Von Cotzhausen at Haus Kambach, near Aachen, in the Rhine Province of the Kingdom of Prussia. At the time, this castle and estate belonged to his father.

After his father's death in 1842, Cotzhausen emigrated to the United States. He settled in Milwaukee, Wisconsin, in 1849 and quickly became involved in local business. He operated several merchandise businesses before ultimately becoming invested with Valentin Blatz, and spent much of his life as an executive of the Valentin Blatz Brewing Company.

He was briefly involved in politics, and was elected to the Milwaukee City Council and the Wisconsin State Assembly in 1857, running on the Democratic Party ticket. He ran into controversy with his party during the 1858 legislative session, however. He voted in favor of a Republican investigation into fraud in the land grant process, and, as a result, was kicked out of the Democratic caucus.

Cotzhausen was considered an invalid from the mid 1880s until his death in 1899.

== Personal life and family ==
Alexander Cotzhausen was a son of Heinrich Wilhelm Ludwig Freiherr von Cotzhausen-Wedau with his second wife, Catharina Magdalena Josephina Hubertina (née von Broich). His father acted as president of the College of Electors during the reign of Napoleon, and was created as a baron under the laws of the French Empire. Castle Kambach, where Alexander was born, had been purchased and renovated by their ancestor Johann Bernhard von Cotshausen in 1701, and was passed down to Frederick's father. According to German sources, the estate was sold not long after Heinrich's death in 1842, though the Cotzhausens continued to use the honorific "baron".

Alexander's younger brother, Frederick W. Cotzhausen (Ewald Alfred Arthur Frederick William von Cotzhausen), emigrated to America in 1856 and became a prominent lawyer and Democratic politician in Milwaukee. He served in the Wisconsin State Senate.

In 1851, Alexander Cotzhausen married Emilie Henriette Catharina Friederike Esch, another German American immigrant. They had at least four children together.

- Their daughter Clara (Louisa Magdalena Clara Augusta) married German immigrant Carl Mueller. One of their children was Alexander Mueller, a painter and influential member of the art community in Milwaukee.
- Their son Louis (Heinrich Ludwig Alexander Friedrich Von Cotzhausen) became a prominent and influential physician and therapist in Philadelphia.
- Their son Alfred (Alfred Emil Alexander von Cotzhausen), was a successful businessman in Milwaukee in lithography and printing, and was president and general manager of the American Fine Art Company. He was ruined in the Great Depression, lost the family estate, and died in poverty.

Alexander Cotzhausen was active in several Milwaukee fraternal organizations. With the Order of Druids, he was a founder and officer in the Walhalla Grove No. 2 and Milwaukee's Supreme Arch Chapter No. 3. With the Sons of Hermann, he was a founder of the Germania Lodge No. 6.

Wisconsin State Assembly
Preceded by Moses M. Strong	Member of the Wisconsin State Assembly from the Milwaukee 2nd district January 4, 1858 – January 3, 1859	Succeeded by Charles J. Kern
