= Philadelphia (village), New York =

Philadelphia, New York
- Village
- Location within New York Location within the United States
- Coordinates: 44°9′9″N 75°42′30″W
- Country: United States
- State: New York
- County: Jefferson
- Town: Philadelphia

Area
  - Total: 0.96 sq mi (2.48 km^{2})
  - Land: 0.96 sq mi (2.48 km^{2})
  - Water: 0 sq mi (0.00 km^{2})
- Elevation: 486 ft (148 m)

Population (2020)
  - Total: 1,172
  - Density: 1,146.4/sq mi (442.63/km^{2})
- Time zone: UTC-5 (Eastern (EST))
  - Summer (DST): UTC-4 (EDT)
- ZIP code: 13673
- Area code: 315
- FIPS code: 36-57551
- GNIS feature ID: 0960294
- Website: townofphiladelphiany.com

Philadelphia is a village in Jefferson County, New York, United States. The population was 1,252 at the 2010 census, down from 1,519 in 2000.

The village is in the town of Philadelphia and is northeast of Watertown. It is also just northwest of Fort Drum.

The village contains a "Quaker Cemetery".

== History ==
The current village was formerly "Friends Settlement" and "Benezet". It was settled by Quakers.

Philadelphia was incorporated as a village in 1872.

Philadelphia holds the December record low temperature for New York state of −47 °F (−44 °C).

== Geography ==
According to the United States Census Bureau, the village has a total area of 0.89 square miles (2.3 km^{2}), all land.

The village is located on U.S. Route 11 at the junction with New York State Route 26. US-11 leads southwest 17 miles (27 km) to Watertown, the Jefferson county seat, and northeast 18 miles (29 km) to Gouverneur. NY-26 leads northwest 18 miles (29 km) to Alexandria Bay on the St. Lawrence River.

The Indian River runs through the center of the village.

== Demographics ==
Historical population
Census	Pop.	Note	%±
1890	783		—
1900	873		11.5%
1910	842		−3.6%
1920	794		−5.7%
1930	817		2.9%
1940	722		−11.6%
1950	870		20.5%
1960	868		−0.2%
1970	858		−1.2%
1980	855		−0.3%
1990	1,478		72.9%
2000	1,519		2.8%
2010	1,252		−17.6%
2020	1,172		−6.4%
U.S. Decennial Census

As of the census of 2000, there were 1,519 people, 546 households, and 406 families residing in the village. The population density was 1,692.2 inhabitants per square mile (653.4/km^{2}). There were 595 housing units at an average density of 662.8 per square mile (255.9/km^{2}). The racial makeup of the village was 85.98% White, 6.65% Black or African American, 0.59% Native American, 1.45% Asian, 0.13% Pacific Islander, 2.50% from other races, and 2.70% from two or more races. Hispanic or Latino of any race were 5.20% of the population.

There were 546 households, out of which 46.5% had children under the age of 18 living with them, 58.2% were married couples living together, 12.1% had a female householder with no husband present, and 25.5% were non-families. 21.4% of all households were made up of individuals, and 11.5% had someone living alone who was 65 years of age or older. The average household size was 2.78 and the average family size was 3.23.

In the village, the population was spread out, with 35.1% under the age of 18, 11.7% from 18 to 24, 31.9% from 25 to 44, 13.0% from 45 to 64, and 8.3% who were 65 years of age or older. The median age was 27 years. For every 100 females, there were 94.5 males. For every 100 females age 18 and over, there were 90.0 males.

The median income for a household in the village was $27,083, and the median income for a family was $30,078. Males had a median income of $27,833 versus $20,764 for females. The per capita income for the village was $12,210. About 15.9% of families and 17.4% of the population were below the poverty line, including 21.7% of those under age 18 and 19.4% of those age 65 or over.

== Education ==
The school district is the Indian River Central School District.
