= Grass Lake (New York) =

Lake in Jefferson County, New York, United States

- Location within New York Location within the United States
- Location: Jefferson County, New York, United States
- Coordinates: 44°20′28.3″N 75°42′51.8″W
- Primary outflows: Grass Creek
- Basin countries: United States
- Surface area: 320 acres (1.3 km^{2})
- Average depth: 15 feet (4.6 m)
- Max. depth: 55 feet (17 m)
- Shore length^{1}: 6.8 miles (10.9 km)
- Surface elevation: 321 feet (98 m)
- Settlements: Nelson Corner, New York
- ^{1} Shore length is not a well-defined measure.

Grass Lake is located by Nelson Corner, New York. Fish species present in the lake are northern pike, smallmouth bass, largemouth bass, walleye, yellow perch, tiger muskie, and bluegill. There is a state owned hard surface ramp on the west shore.
