= 26th Wisconsin Infantry Regiment =

Union Army infantry regiment

- Flag of Wisconsin
- Active: September 17, 1862 – June 17, 1865
- Country: United States
- Allegiance: Union
- Branch: Infantry
- Size: Regiment
- Engagements: American Civil War: Fredericksburg Campaign; Battle of Fredericksburg; Mud March; Chancellorsville Campaign; Gettysburg campaign; Battle of Gettysburg; Chattanooga campaign; Battle of Wauhatchie; Battle of Missionary Ridge; Atlanta campaign; Battle of Rocky Face Ridge; Battle of Resaca; Battle of New Hope Church; Battle of Marietta; Battle of Kolb's Farm; Battle of Kennesaw Mountain; Battle of Peachtree Creek; Savannah Campaign; Carolinas campaign; Battle of Averasborough; Battle of Bentonville

Commanders
- Colonel: William H. Jacobs
- Lt. Col.: Hans Boebal
- Major: Henry Baetz
- Captain: John W. Fuchs
- Lt. Col.: Frederick C. Winkler

The 26th Wisconsin Infantry Regiment was a volunteer infantry regiment that served in the Union Army during the American Civil War. The regiment had a total enrollment of 1,089 men during its service, of which 191, (17.5%) were killed in action or mortally wounded, the fourth-highest percentage of any Union regiment. Almost 90% of its members were of German heritage.

== Service ==
The 26th Wisconsin was organized at Milwaukee, Wisconsin and mustered into Federal service on September 17, 1862. Except for Company G, which consisted in part of native born Americans, the regiment was composed almost entirely of men of German birth or German parentage. Left State for Washington, D.C., October 6, 1862. Attached to 2nd Brigade, 3rd Division, 11th Army Corps, Army of the Potomac, to October, 1863, and Army of the Cumberland, to April, 1864. 3rd Brigade, 3rd Division, 20th Army Corps, Army of the Cumberland, to June, 1865.

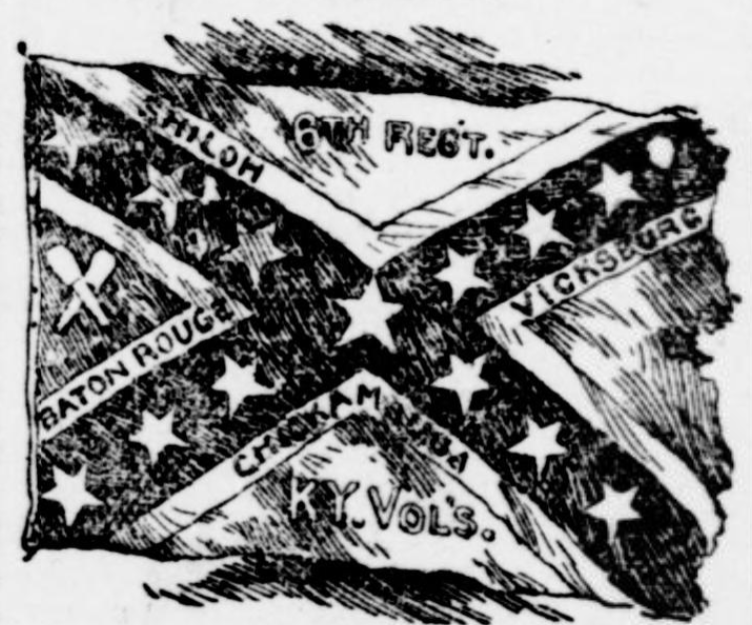
Flag of the 6th Kentucky Infantry captured by the regiment at Peachtree Creek, July 20, 1864

== Detailed Service ==
Moved from Washington, D.C., to Fairfax Courthouse, Virginia, October 15, 1862. Movement to Gainesville, Virginia November 2–9, and duty there until November 18. Moved to Centreville, Virginia November 18, thence to Falmouth, Virginia, December 9–14. Battle of Fredericksburg, Virginia, December 15 (Reserve). At Stafford Courthouse, Virginia, until January 20, 1863. "Mud March" January 20–24. At Stafford Courthouse until April 27. Chancellorsville Campaign April 27-May 6. Battle of Chancellorsville May 1–5. Gettysburg campaign (Pennsylvania) June 11-July 24. Battle of Gettysburg July 1–3. Pursuit of Robert E. Lee's army to Manassas Gap, Virginia, July 5–24. At Warrenton Junction, Virginia, until September 17. Moved to Rappahannock Station September 17, and to Bridgeport, Alabama, September 24-October 3. Duty there till October 27. Re-opening Tennessee River October 27–29. Battle of Wauhatchie October 28–29. Duty in Lookout Valley till November 22. Chattanooga-Ringgold Campaign November 23–27. Orchard Knob November 23. Tunnel Hill November 24–25. Battle of Missionary Ridge November 25. March to relief of Knoxville, Tennessee, November 27-December 8. Duty in Lookout Valley till January 25, 1864, and at Whiteside, Alabama, until April 23. Atlanta campaign (Georgia) May 1 to September 8. Demonstration at and Battle of Rocky Face Ridge May 8–11. Buzzard's Roost Gap May 8–9. Battle of Resaca May 14–15. Cassville May 19. Battle of New Hope Church May 25. Operations on line of Pumpkin Vine Creek and battles about Dallas, New Hope Church and Allatoona Hills May 25-June 5. Battle of Marietta and operations about Marietta and against Kennesaw Mountain June 10-July 2. Pine Hill June 11–14. Lost Mountain June 15–17. Gilgal or Golgotha Church June 15. Muddy Creek June 17. Noyes Creek June 19. Battle of Kolb's Farm June 22. Assault on Kennesaw Battle of Kennesaw Mountain June 27. Ruff's Station July 4. Chattahoochie River July 5–17. Battle of Peachtree Creek July 19–20. Siege of Atlanta July 22-August 25. Operations at Chattahoochie River Bridge August 26-September 2. Occupation of Atlanta September 2-November 15. March to the sea November 15-December 10. Siege of Savannah December 10–21. Campaign of the Carolinas January to April, 1865. Lawtonville, South Carolina, February 2. Reconnaissance on Goldsboro Road March 14. Taylor's Hole Creek, Averysboro, North Carolina, March 16. Battle of Bentonville March 19–21. Mill Creek March 22. Occupation of Goldsboro March 24. Advance on Raleigh April 10–14. Occupation of Raleigh April 14. Bennett's House April 26. Surrender of Johnston and his army. March to Washington, D. C., via Richmond, Virginia, April 29-May 17. Grand Review May 24. Mustered out June 17, 1865.

== Casualties ==
The 26th Wisconsin suffered 12 officers and 176 enlisted men killed in action or who later died of their wounds, plus another 77 enlisted men who died of disease, for a total of 265 fatalities.

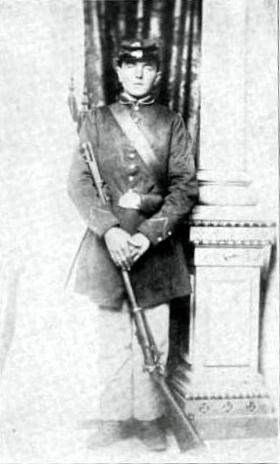
John Haag, Company B, 26th Wisconsin Volunteer Infantry, discharged on February 17, 1863, for disability.

== Commanders ==
- Colonel William H. Jacobs (August 16, 1862 – May 2, 1863; July 4 – November 8, 1863) was wounded at Chancellorsville. He was able to return to the regiment after Gettysburg, but ultimately left in the Fall of 1863 due to his lingering wounds and resigned in January 1864. After the war he became a Wisconsin state senator.
- Lieutenant Colonel Hans Boebal (May 2, 1863 – July 1, 1863) was wounded at Gettysburg and lost his right leg. After the war he was Milwaukee city treasurer and a federal revenue collector.
- Major Henry Baetz (July 1, 1863) was also wounded at Gettysburg and was never able to return to duty. After the war he became the 6th state treasurer of Wisconsin.
- Captain John W. Fuchs (July 2, 1863 – July 4, 1863) began the war as captain of Co. A and commanded the regiment at Gettysburg after the field officers were all wounded. He was also wounded at Gettysburg, but less severely.
- Lieutenant Colonel Frederick C. Winkler (November 8, 1863 – June 13, 1865) commanded the regiment as a captain, major, and lieutenant colonel, and mustered out with the regiment at the end of the war. He began the war as captain of Co. B but had been detailed to the staff of General Carl Schurz during Chancellorsville and Gettysburg. He resigned that staff job to help lead the regiment at Gettysburg after the field officers were all wounded. He was designated for promotion to colonel, but never mustered at that rank. After the war he received a double brevet to brigadier general, and went on to become a Wisconsin state legislator.

== Notable members ==
- Henry Fink was a private in Co. B and was wounded at Chancellorsville. He was transferred to the Veterans Reserve Corps and discharged in 1864. After the war he served as a Wisconsin state legislator.
- William H. Hemschemeyer was enlisted in Co. F and rose to first sergeant before being commissioned first lieutenant of Co. I in 1864, and promoted to captain later that year. After the war he served as a Wisconsin state legislator.
- Francis Huebschmann was chief surgeon of the regiment. He was technically a prisoner for three days during the Battle of Gettysburg, when his field hospital fell behind enemy lines. He was appointed chief of a corps hospital in 1864. He served as a Wisconsin state senator before and after the war.
- John W. Liebenstein was a private in Co. B. After the war he served as a Wisconsin state legislator.
- Christian Sarnow was briefly first lieutenant in Co. A, but resigned in November 1862. Earlier in the war, he had been "ensign" of Co. H of the 1st Wisconsin Infantry Regiment. After the war he served as a Wisconsin state legislator.

== Popular culture ==
A soldier from the 26th – a nervous lad – is featured in a scene in the third chapter of MacKinlay Kantor's Pulitzer Prize-winning novel Andersonville (1955).

== See also ==
- List of Wisconsin Civil War units
- Wisconsin in the American Civil War
