= Muskellunge Lake =

Lake in New York, United States

- Location within New York Location within the United States
- Location: Jefferson County, New York, United States
- Coordinates: 44°17′50″N 075°41′40″W
- Primary outflows: Indian River
- Basin countries: United States
- Surface area: 288 acres (1.17 km^{2})
- Max. depth: 25 feet (7.6 m)
- Shore length^{1}: 5.4 miles (8.7 km)
- Surface elevation: 302 feet (92 m)
- Islands: Big Island, Little Island
- Settlements: Oxbow, New York
- ^{1} Shore length is not a well-defined measure.

Muskellunge Lake is located by Oxbow, New York. The outlet flows into the Indian River. Fish species present in the lake are largemouth bass, bluegill, yellow perch, northern pike, and black crappie. There is a state owned carry down on New Connecticut Road. There is also an access at the northeast shore campground.
