= Hyde Lake =

Lake in Jefferson County, New York, United States

- Location within New York Hyde Lake (the United States)
- Location: Jefferson County, New York, United States
- Coordinates: 44°14′37″N 75°50′00″W
- Primary outflows: Hyde Creek
- Basin countries: United States
- Surface area: 186 acres (0.75 km^{2})
- Average depth: 12 feet (3.7 m)
- Max. depth: 18 feet (5.5 m)
- Shore length^{1}: 3 miles (4.8 km)
- Surface elevation: 384 feet (117 m)
- Settlements: Cooper Corners, New York
- ^{1} Shore length is not a well-defined measure.

Hyde Lake is located by Cooper Corners, New York. Fish species present in the lake are largemouth bass, smallmouth bass, rock bass, northern pike, walleye, yellow perch, yellow bullhead, bluegill, and black crappie. There is a state owned beach launch off NY-26 north of Theresa, New York.
