= Philadelphia, New York =

- Town
- Location within New York Location within the United States
- Country: United States
- State: New York
- County: Jefferson

Government
  - Mayor: Cheryl K. Horton (R) Town Council: Robert E. Watson (R); M. Shuyler Weaver (D); Sandra L. Carpenter (R); Ronald E. Spicer (D)

Area
  - Total: 37.69 sq mi (97.61 km^{2})
  - Land: 37.67 sq mi (97.56 km^{2})
  - Water: 0.019 sq mi (0.05 km^{2})

Population (2020)
  - Total: 1,964
  - Estimate (2020): 1,880
  - Density: 49.9/sq mi (19.27/km^{2})
- Time zone: EST
  - Summer (DST): EDT
- ZIP Codes: 13673 (Philadelphia); 13691 (Theresa)
- Area code: 315
- FIPS code: 36-045-57562
- Website: townofphiladelphiany.com

Philadelphia is a town in Jefferson County, New York, United States. The population was 1,964 at the 2020 census.

The town contains a village also called Philadelphia. Both are in the northeastern part of Jefferson County.

== History ==
The area was first settled by Europeans circa 1804. A grist mill was built in 1804 on the Indian River, adjacent to the north side of the large waterfall in the village. The mill was operated until it was dismantled in the 1970s. The town of Philadelphia was formed in 1821 from part of the town of Le Ray. In 1872, the community of Philadelphia set itself off from the town by incorporating as a village.

In 1959, the Indian River Central High School opened, serving students from the towns of Philadelphia, Theresa, Antwerp, Leray, and Pamelia.

The Sterlingville Archeological District was listed on the National Register of Historic Places in 1995.

== Geography ==
According to the United States Census Bureau, the town has a total area of 37.6 square miles (97.4 km^{2}), of which 0.02 square miles (0.05 km^{2}), or 0.06%, are water.

== Transportation ==
U.S. Route 11 is a northeast–southwest highway that crosses the center of the town. New York Route 26 progresses north from Philadelphia towards Alexandria Bay, and south to Vestal.

The town had been the junction for several branches of the Rome, Watertown and Ogdensburg Railroad. Branches went north to Clayton, Ogdensburg and Massena Springs, and they went south to Niagara Falls, Syracuse, Rome and Utica. The successor railroad, the New York Central Railroad, last ran passenger trains through the town from Massena to Syracuse in 1964. The New York Central's successor, CSX Transportation still transports freight by rail through Philadelphia.

== Climate ==
Philadelphia holds the all-time December record low temperature for New York state at −47 °F (−44 °C).

Climate data for Philadelphia, New York (1971–2000)
Month	Jan	Feb	Mar	Apr	May	Jun	Jul	Aug	Sep	Oct	Nov	Dec	Year
Record high °F (°C)	54 (12)	59 (15)	72 (22)	80 (27)	86 (30)	92 (33)	96 (36)	94 (34)	94 (34)	83 (28)	76 (24)	64 (18)	96 (36)
Mean daily maximum °F (°C)	28 (−2)	30 (−1)	39 (4)	50 (10)	64 (18)	71 (22)	76 (24)	75 (24)	69 (21)	56 (13)	43 (6)	32 (0)	53 (12)
Mean daily minimum °F (°C)	6 (−14)	7 (−14)	18 (−8)	31 (−1)	42 (6)	50 (10)	54 (12)	54 (12)	48 (9)	39 (4)	27 (−3)	15 (−9)	33 (1)
Record low °F (°C)	−44 (−42)	−42 (−41)	−40 (−40)	−10 (−23)	16 (−9)	26 (−3)	30 (−1)	31 (−1)	23 (−5)	10 (−12)	−14 (−26)	−47 (−44)	−47 (−44)
Average precipitation inches (mm)	4.15 (105)	2.96 (75)	3.70 (94)	3.99 (101)	4.34 (110)	4.24 (108)	4.57 (116)	4.62 (117)	5.07 (129)	4.33 (110)	4.84 (123)	4.48 (114)	51.39 (1,305)
Average snowfall inches (cm)	57.8 (147)	36.4 (92)	30.4 (77)	13.4 (34)	1.6 (4.1)	0 (0)	0 (0)	0 (0)	0 (0)	2.3 (5.8)	27.9 (71)	66.3 (168)	236.1 (600)
Average precipitation days	19.1	14.5	15.6	13.6	14.1	13.6	12.2	12.8	13.0	14.1	17.2	18.7	178.5
Average snowy days	17.1	13.1	11.8	5.1	1.1	0	0	0	0	1.9	9.4	18.3	77.8
Source: TWC

== Demographics ==
Historical population
Census	Pop.	Note	%±
1830	1,167		—
1840	1,888		61.8%
1850	1,915		1.4%
1860	1,790		−6.5%
1870	1,679		−6.2%
1880	1,750		4.2%
1890	1,662		−5.0%
1900	1,750		5.3%
1910	1,640		−6.3%
1920	1,549		−5.5%
1930	1,562		0.8%
1940	1,372		−12.2%
1950	1,222		−10.9%
1960	1,297		6.1%
1970	1,355		4.5%
1980	1,417		4.6%
1990	2,136		50.7%
2000	2,140		0.2%
2010	1,947		−9.0%
2020	1,964		0.9%
2020 (est.)	1,880	▼	−3.4%
U.S. Decennial Census

As of the census of 2000, there were 2,140 people, 759 households, and 582 families residing in the town. The population density was 56.9 people per square mile (22.0 people/km^{2}). There were 823 housing units at an average density of 21.9 per square mile (8.5/km^{2}). The racial makeup of the town was 88.93% White, 4.91% Black or African American, 0.61% Native American, 1.17% Asian, 0.09% Pacific Islander, 2.06% from other races, and 2.24% from two or more races. Hispanic or Latino of any race were 4.16% of the population.

There were 759 households, out of which 45.5% had children under the age of 18 living with them, 60.6% were married couples living together, 11.3% had a female householder with no husband present, and 23.2% were non-families. 19.5% of all households were made up of individuals, and 10.1% had someone living alone who was 65 years of age or older. The average household size was 2.82 and the average family size was 3.20.

In the town, the population was spread out, with 33.7% under the age of 18, 10.1% from 18 to 24, 32.0% from 25 to 44, 15.7% from 45 to 64, and 8.5% who were 65 years of age or older. The median age was 29 years. For every 100 females, there were 96.9 males. For every 100 females age 18 and over, there were 93.6 males.

The median income for a household in the town was $31,250, and the median income for a family was $35,909. Males had a median income of $29,605 versus $21,121 for females. The per capita income for the town was $13,555. About 12.2% of families and 13.8% of the population were below the poverty line, including 17.2% of those under age 18 and 15.5% of those age 65 or over.

== Notable persons ==
- Cassius Marcellus Coolidge (1844-1934), known today for his famous paintings of Dogs Playing Poker, was born in Philadelphia and lived there or in nearby Antwerp for much of his adult life.
- Eugene (Gene) Mosher (born January 13, 1949) is best known for inventing the graphic touchscreen point of sale computer and is a pioneer of human-computer interaction, including application-specific GUIs and network computing. A graduate of Indian River Central and Xaverius College in Borgerhout, Belgium. He received a Bachelor of Arts degree in Social Anthropology from the University at Buffalo, The State University of New York in 1972. During the period from 1972 until 1984 Mosher built and operated six restaurants at locations in Buffalo, Syracuse and Norfolk, Virginia. The Syracuse restaurants were equipped with Apple II computers which he had programmed to operated as point of sale devices to record transactions and speed customer fulfillment. In 1984 Mosher moved to Eugene, Oregon to devote his full time effort to begin development of his graphical touchscreen point of sale computer. For this project he established a U.S. Trademark - ViewTouch - and chose the first consumer market computer with a bitmapped colorgraphic display, the Atari ST. The touchscreen overlay was acquired from MicroTouch and the PoS (Point of Sale) printer from Star Micronics. This equipment made possible to build the graphical touchscreen computer which was the initial hardware platform for Mosher's breakthrough invention of the world's first point of sale software with a graphical touchscreen interface. His decision to not patent his invention ultimately led to the development of a universal adoption of the graphical touchscreen PoS computer as an essential standard component in the hospitality and retail industries and preceded the appearance of graphical touchscreens on cellphones twenty years later.

== Philadelphia cream cheese ==
When cream cheese first appeared in the United States around 1850, it was produced in small batches by many farmers in the town. Because of its origin, it eventually became legend that Philadelphia brand cream cheese was named for Philadelphia, New York. Philadelphia Cream Cheese was later named for Philadelphia to brand it as a high-quality dairy product.

== Communities within Philadelphia ==
- Fort Drum – The military reservation occupies the southeastern third of Philadelphia.
- Philadelphia (originally "Quaker Settlement") – A village near the center of the town on US-11.
- Pine Plains – A location in the southern part of the town, near Sterlingville.
- Rogers – A location in the southern corner of the town, south of Strickland Corners on County Road 30.
- Shurtleff Corners – A location on the northwestern town line, northwest of Philadelphia village on NY-26.
- Sterlingville – A former hamlet in the southern corner of the town.
- Strickland Corners – A location in the southern corner of the town on County Road 30, northwest of Sterlingville.
- Whitney Corners – A location on County Road 20, west of Philadelphia village.
