= Sixberry Lake =

Lake in Jefferson County, New York, United States

- Location within New York Sixberry Lake (the United States)
- Location: Jefferson County, New York, United States
- Coordinates: 44°16′48″N 75°46′30″W
- Primary outflows: Millsite Lake
- Basin countries: United States
- Surface area: 128 acres (0.52 km^{2})
- Average depth: 46 feet (14 m)
- Max. depth: 90 feet (27 m)
- Shore length^{1}: 2.2 miles (3.5 km)
- Surface elevation: 344 feet (105 m)
- Settlements: Chapel Corners, New York
- ^{1} Shore length is not a well-defined measure.

Sixberry Lake is located by Redwood, New York. The outlet flows into Millsite Lake. Fish species present in the lake are northern pike, smallmouth bass, lake trout, landlocked salmon, walleye, yellow perch, atlantic salmon, and bluegill. There is a state owned hard surface ramp on the lake off County Route 21.

== See also ==
- Camp Tousey
