= Gottlob E. Weiss =

American politician

Gottlob E. Weiss (March 25, 1820 – April 19, 1900) was an American politician.

Born in Saxony, Weiss moved to Wayne, Wisconsin Territory in 1847 and lived there until 1853; he moved to Milwaukee, Wisconsin in 1853. In 1854, Weiss moved to West Bend, Wisconsin. He served as sheriff of Washington County, Wisconsin in 1855 and 1856, and he became sheriff of Ozaukee County in 1856. Weiss returned to Milwaukee in 1857. In 1873, Weiss served in the Wisconsin State Assembly as a Democrat. He was an accountant. Weiss died on April 19, 1900 and was buried at Forest Home Cemetery in Milwaukee.
