= Ogdensburg International Airport =

Public airport in Upstate New York

- IATA: OGS; ICAO: KOGS; FAA LID: OGS

Summary
- Airport type: Public
- Owner: Ogdensburg Bridge & Port Authority
- Serves: Ogdensburg, New York and Ottawa, Ontario
- Location: Oswegatchie, New York
- Elevation AMSL: 297 ft (91 m)
- Coordinates: 44°40′55″N 075°27′56″W
- Website: www.ogsair.com

Maps
- FAA airport diagram
- Interactive map of Ogdensburg International Airport

Runways
| Direction | Length | | Surface |
| Direction | ft | m | Surface |
|---|---|---|---|
| 9/27 | 6,400 | 1,951 | Asphalt |

Statistics (2011)
- Aircraft operations: 2,756
- Based aircraft: 7
- Source: Federal Aviation Administration

Ogdensburg International Airport (IATA: OGS, ICAO: KOGS, FAA LID: OGS) is a public airport located in the town of Oswegatchie, 2 miles (3.2 km) southeast of Ogdensburg, in St. Lawrence County, New York. It is owned by the Ogdensburg Bridge & Port Authority, which also owns and operates the Ogdensburg–Prescott International Bridge, Port of Ogdensburg-Marine Terminal Facility, Commerce Park, Port of Waddington, a medium-heavy industrial park and two short line railroads. The Ogdensburg Bridge and Port Authority is a New York State public-benefit corporation. The international airport is just outside the city limits on NY 812 and 60 miles south of downtown Ottawa. It is used for general aviation and commercial service. Scheduled commercial flights are operated by one airline, with service subsidized by the Essential Air Service program: Breeze Airways.

Federal Aviation Administration records say the airport had 603 passenger boardings (enplanements) in calendar year 2008, 2,329 in 2010, and 10,281 in 2016. The National Plan of Integrated Airport Systems for 2011–2015 categorized it as a general aviation airport (the commercial service category requires at least 2,500 enplanements per year).

== Facilities and aircraft ==
Ogdensburg International Airport covers 500 acres (202 ha) at an elevation of 297 feet (91 m). Its one runway – Runway 9/27 – was 5,200 by 150 feet (1,585 x 46 m) asphalt until the summer of 2016 when it was extended to 6,400 (1,951 m) by 150 feet (46 m) length. In the year ending March 23, 2015 the airport had 1,508 aircraft operations, average 126 per month: 71% air taxi, 21% general aviation, and 8% military. Seven aircraft were then based at the airport, all single-engine. There are a handful of buildings, including a small hangar, a storage shed, and a fire hall.

== Airline and destinations ==
=== Passenger ===
| Airlines | Destinations | Refs. |
|---|---|---|
| Breeze Airways | Raleigh/Durham; Seasonal: Orlando | |

Airline flights (Mohawk DC-3s) started in 1957 after the airport got a 3,800-foot (1,200 m) paved runway.

A handful of tenants besides Breeze Airways are at the airport:

- St. Lawrence Flying Club Incorporated – fixed wing and rotary flight training

== Statistics ==
=== Busiest Passenger Routes ===
Busiest domestic routes from OGS (June 2025 – May 2026)
| Rank | City | Passengers | Carriers |
|---|---|---|---|
| 1 | Washington–Dulles, Virginia | 12,040 | Breeze |
| 2 | Raleigh/Durham, North Carolina | 9,000 | Breeze |
| 3 | Orlando, Florida | 2,310 | Breeze |

=== Annual traffic ===
Traffic (enplanements + deplanements) by calendar year
| | Passengers | Change from previous year |
|---|---|---|
| 2010 | 4,450 | N/A |
| 2011 | 6,933 | ▲55.80% |
| 2012 | 9,914 | ▲43.00% |
| 2013 | 10,573 | ▲6.65% |
| 2014 | 10,754 | ▲1.71% |
| 2015 | 9,276 | ▼13.74% |
| 2016 | 19,577 | ▲111.05% |
| 2017 | 44,206 | ▲125.81% |
| 2018 | 45,230 | ▲2.32% |
| 2019 | 53,000 | ▲17.18% |
| 2020 | 18,000 | ▼66.04% |
| 2021 | 22,000 | ▲22.22% |
| 2022 | 17,000 | ▼22.73% |
| 2023 | 11,490 | ▼32.41% |

== See also ==
Other New York State airports that target Canadian travellers:

- Plattsburgh International Airport – alternative to Montreal (Dorval)
- Buffalo International Airport – alternative to airports in the Toronto/Golden Horseshoe (Toronto Pearson, Hamilton John C. Munro, Toronto Billy Bishop)
- Watertown International Airport – alternative to Ottawa and Kingston
- List of airports in New York

== Other sources ==
- Essential Air Service documents (Docket OST-1997-2842) from the U.S. Department of Transportation:
  - Order 2005-5-8: reselects Mesa Air Group, Inc., d/b/a Air Midwest, to continue providing essential air service (EAS) at Massena, Ogdensburg and Watertown, New York, for a two-year period, and establishes an annual subsidy of $1,757,834 for service consisting of three round trips each weekday and three over the weekend period between the communities and Pittsburgh, with 19-seat Beech 1900D aircraft.
  - Order 2006-12-22: selecting Big Sky Transportation Co., a wholly owned subsidiary of MAIR Holdings, Inc. d/b/a Big Sky Airlines, to provide essential air service (EAS) at Massena, Ogdensburg, and Watertown, New York, consisting of 18 weekly round trips, three each weekday and three each weekend, to Boston, with 19-seat Beech 1900D turboprop aircraft for the two-year period beginning on or about March 1, 2007, at a combined annual subsidy of $2,097,906.
  - Order 2008-3-15: selecting Hyannis Air Service, Inc. d/b/a Cape Air, to provide subsidized essential air service (EAS) at Massena, Ogdensburg, and Watertown, New York, for the two-year period beginning when the carrier inaugurates full EAS pursuant to this Order, at a total annual subsidy of $3,879,863.
  - Order 2011-1-6: selecting Hyannis Air Service, Inc. d/b/a Cape Air (Cape Air), to continue providing subsidized essential air service (EAS) at Massena (for two years), at the annual subsidy rate of $1,708,911, and at Ogdensburg (for four years), at the annual subsidy rate of $1,702,697, beginning when the carrier inaugurates the new service pattern.
