= William H. Jacobs =

19th century American politician

Member of the Wisconsin Senate from the 3rd district
- In office January 4, 1875 – January 1, 1877
- Preceded by: Frederick W. Cotzhausen
- Succeeded by: Thomas A. Bones

Personal details
- Born: November 26, 1831 Holzen, Duchy of Brunswick, German Confederation
- Died: September 11, 1882 (aged 50) Milwaukee, Wisconsin, U.S.
- Resting place: Forest Home Cemetery, Milwaukee
- Party: Democratic
- Spouse: Caroline Schmidt (m. 1857–1882)
- Children: 9

Military service
- Allegiance: United States
- Branch/service: United States Volunteers; Union Army
- Years of service: 1862–1864
- Rank: Colonel, USV
- Commands: 26th Reg. Wis. Vol. Infantry
- Battles/wars: American Civil War: Battle of Chancellorsville

William Heinrich Jacobs (November 26, 1831 – September 11, 1882) was a German American immigrant, banker, and Democratic politician. He served two years in the Wisconsin State Senate, representing the southern half of Milwaukee County. During the American Civil War, he served as colonel of the 26th Wisconsin Infantry Regiment (a German regiment) in the Union Army. He is the namesake of the town of Jacobs, Wisconsin. His name is sometimes anglicized as William Henry Jacobs.

== Early life ==
Wilhelm Heinrich Jacobs was born on November 26, 1831, in the municipality of Holzen, in what was then the Duchy of Brunswick in central Germany. He was the only son of Christian Jacobs and Christiana Koch. Jacobs emigrated to the United States in 1850, settling first at St. Louis, Missouri, then moving to Milwaukee, Wisconsin, in 1851. In Milwaukee, he worked as a court clerk, purchased land, and established the Second Ward Savings Bank (1855). On November 11, 1857, he married Caroline Schmidt; they had nine children, though only six survived to adulthood—five daughters and one son.

== American Civil War ==
During the American Civil War, Jacobs was an appointed colonel of the 26th Wisconsin Volunteer Infantry Regiment on August 17, 1862. He was wounded while in command of his regiment at its first engagement, the Battle of Chancellorsville, on May 2, 1863. Jacobs then left the regiment on a leave of absence before resigning due to his wounds on January 11, 1864.

== Later life ==
In 1874 Jacobs was elected as a Democrat to the Wisconsin State Senate, where he served from 1875 to 1877. He died on September 11, 1882, in Milwaukee, Wisconsin.

== Legacy ==
The Town of Jacobs in Ashland County, Wisconsin, was named in his honor. The Second Ward Savings Bank, established by Jacobs in 1855, is now home to the Milwaukee County Historical Society.

Military offices
Regiment established	Command of the 26th Wisconsin Infantry Regiment; September 17, 1862 – May 2, 1863	Succeeded by Lt. Col. Hans Boebal
Wisconsin Senate
Preceded by Frederick W. Cotzhausen	Member of the Wisconsin Senate from the 3rd district January 4, 1875 – January 1, 1877	Succeeded by Thomas A. Bones
