= Eel Weir State Park =

State park in St. Lawrence County, New York

- Location within New York
- Type: State park
- Location: RD #3; Ogdensburg, New York
- Nearest city: Ogdensburg, New York
- Coordinates: 44°37′48″N 75°28′34″W
- Area: 16 acres (0.065 km^{2})
- Operator: New York State Office of Parks, Recreation and Historic Preservation
- Visitors: 3,377 (in 2014)
- Open: Memorial Day to Labor Day
- Camp sites: 38
- Website: Whetstone Gulf State Park

Eel Weir State Park is a 16-acre (0.065 km^{2}) state park in St. Lawrence County, New York. The park is located in the St. Lawrence Valley on the Oswegatchie River approximately two miles (3.2 km) from Black Lake and approximately eight miles (13 km) southwest of Ogdensburg.

== Facilities ==
The park is open from Memorial Day through Labor Day and offers 38 campsites, picnic tables and pavilions, bass fishing, and hiking trails.

== See also ==
- List of New York state parks
