= Indian River (Black Lake) =

Location
- Country: United States
- State: New York

Physical characteristics
- Mouth: Black Lake
  - location: Rossie, New York
  - coordinates: 44°24′21″N 75°38′58″W
  - elevation: 271 ft (83 m)
- Basin size: 390 mi^{2} (1,000 km^{2})

Indian River flows into Black Lake near Rossie, New York. The outlets of Red Lake, Lake of the Woods, and Muskellunge Lake flow into the Indian River. The river is part of the Oswegatchie River watershed.
