= Rossie, New York =

- Town
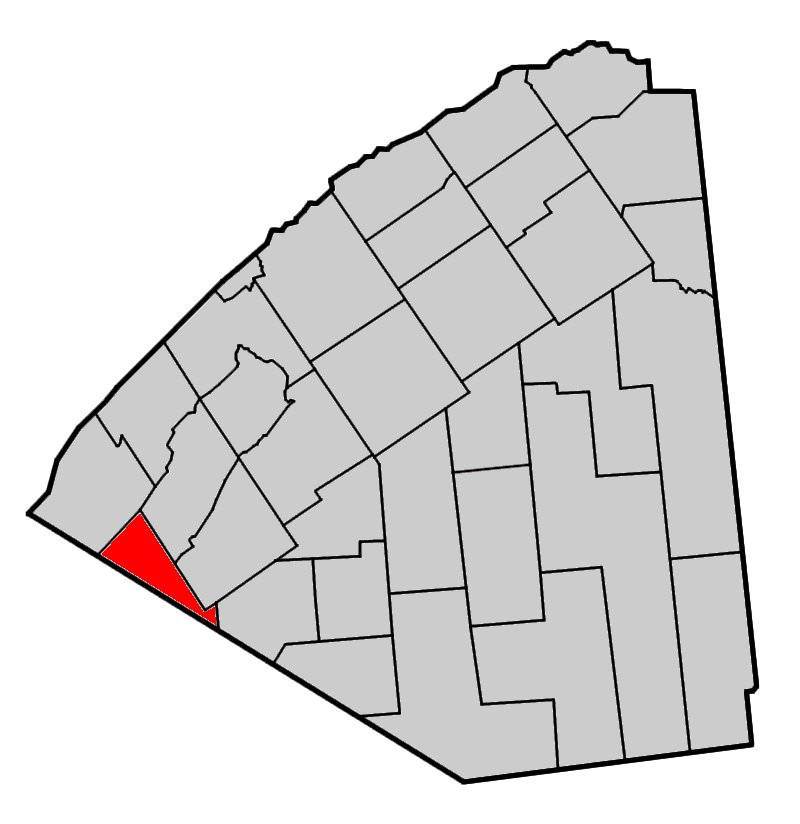
- Map highlighting Rossie's location within St. Lawrence County.

- Location within the state of New York
- Coordinates: 44°20′1″N 75°37′24″W
- Country: United States
- State: New York
- County: St. Lawrence

Area
  - Total: 39.24 sq mi (101.64 km^{2})
  - Land: 37.79 sq mi (97.88 km^{2})
  - Water: 1.45 sq mi (3.76 km^{2})
- Elevation: 460 ft (140 m)

Population (2020)
  - Total: 799
  - Density: 22.3/sq mi (8.62/km^{2})
- Time zone: UTC-5 (Eastern (EST))
  - Summer (DST): UTC-4 (EDT)
- FIPS code: 36-63858
- GNIS feature ID: 0979436
- Website: https://rossieny.org/

Rossie is a town in St. Lawrence County, New York, United States. The population was 877 at the 2010 census. The town is named after the sister of an early land owner.

The Town of Rossie is located on the southwestern border of the county and is west of Gouverneur.

== History ==
The first settler arrived circa 1807.

The town was formed in 1813 from a section of the Town of Russell.

During the War of 1812, residents constructed a block house in the southern part of Rossie.

The iron industry was important to the early town economy, and the Rossie Furnace of 1815 was the first to be built in northern New York. Lead mining was also important. The Rossie Shot Tower is still standing.

== Geography ==
According to the United States Census Bureau, the town has a total area of 39.1 square miles (101 km^{2}), of which 38.1 square miles (99 km^{2}) is land and 1.0 square mile (2.6 km^{2}) (2.53%) is water.

The southwestern town line is the border of Jefferson County.

The Oswegatchie River, looping back, flows in two directions in the south of Rossie.

U.S. Route 11 crosses the town. Yellow Lake and Grass Lake are partly in the town. A very small southern bay of Black Lake is at the north end of Rossie.

== Demographics ==
Historical population
Census	Pop.	Note	%±
1820	869		—
1830	650		−25.2%
1840	1,553		138.9%
1850	1,471		−5.3%
1860	1,609		9.4%
1870	1,661		3.2%
1880	1,709		2.9%
1890	1,493		−12.6%
1900	1,136		−23.9%
1910	981		−13.6%
1920	866		−11.7%
1930	720		−16.9%
1940	706		−1.9%
1950	611		−13.5%
1960	649		6.2%
1970	643		−0.9%
1980	842		30.9%
1990	770		−8.6%
2000	787		2.2%
2010	877		11.4%
2020	799		−8.9%

As of the census of 2000, there were 787 people, 298 households, and 214 families residing in the town. The population density was 20.7 inhabitants per square mile (8.0/km^{2}). There were 482 housing units at an average density of 12.7 per square mile (4.9/km^{2}). The racial makeup of the town was 97.59% White, 0.89% African American, 0.25% Native American, 0.25% Asian, 0.25% from other races, and 0.76% from two or more races. Hispanic or Latino of any race were 0.38% of the population.

There were 298 households, out of which 35.2% had children under the age of 18 living with them, 60.7% were married couples living together, 6.7% had a female householder with no husband present, and 27.9% were non-families. 22.5% of all households were made up of individuals, and 8.7% had someone living alone who was 65 years of age or older. The average household size was 2.64 and the average family size was 3.09.

In the town, the population was spread out, with 28.5% under the age of 18, 6.5% from 18 to 24, 31.3% from 25 to 44, 23.8% from 45 to 64, and 10.0% who were 65 years of age or older. The median age was 35 years. For every 100 females, there were 98.7 males. For every 100 females age 18 and over, there were 98.2 males.

The median income for a household in the town was $27,566, and the median income for a family was $35,893. Males had a median income of $29,167 versus $19,028 for females. The per capita income for the town was $14,205. About 16.1% of families and 20.6% of the population were below the poverty line, including 27.7% of those under age 18 and 13.3% of those age 65 or over.

== Communities and locations in Rossie ==
- Keenes – A hamlet on the western town line in the south part of the town.
- Nelson Corner – A location in the northern part of the town, west of Rossie village.
- Pikes Corner – A hamlet in the southern part of the town on County Road 9.
- Rossie – The hamlet of Rossie is on County Road 3 at the junction of County Road 8 in the northern part of the town.
- Sommerville – A hamlet in the southern part of the town on US-11.
- Spragueville – a hamlet formerly called "Spragues Corners," located on County Road 9 at the county line in the southern part of the town.
- Wegatchie – A hamlet in the southern part of the town on County Road 12.
