= Charles M. Hoyt =

American politician

Charles M. Hoyt was a member of the Wisconsin State Assembly.

== Biography ==
Hoyt was born on August 27, 1827, in Rush, New York. He moved to Milwaukee, Wisconsin, in 1849. From 1864 to 1865, he was Sheriff of Milwaukee County, Wisconsin. Hoyt died in May 1871.

== Political career ==
Hoyt was a member of the Assembly in 1871. Previously, he was a member of the Milwaukee Common Council in 1868.
