= Black Lake (New York) =

- Location within New York Black Lake (the United States)
- Location: Saint Lawrence County, New York, United States
- Coordinates: 44°32′18″N 75°34′07″W
- Type: Lake
- Primary inflows: Indian River, Grass Creek, Black Creek
- Primary outflows: Oswegatchie River
- Basin countries: United States
- Surface area: 7,855 acres (31.79 km^{2})
- Average depth: 8 feet (2.4 m)
- Max. depth: 40 feet (12 m)
- Water volume: .0186 cu mi (0.078 km^{3})
- Shore length^{1}: 57.5 miles (92.5 km)
- Surface elevation: 272 feet (83 m)
- Islands: Apple Island, Bullhead Island, Tavern Island, Prince Island, Conger Island, Bay Island, Belle Island, Bally Island, Pin Island, Elizabeth Island, Watch Island, Jennles Island, Lookout Island, Hogback Island, Bowman Island, Emery Island, Thompson Island, Tin Island, Raspberry Island, Big Island, Snake Island, Limestone and Crab Islands, Wood Island, Booths Island, Jennie's Island
- ^{1} Shore length is not a well-defined measure.

Black Lake is located in the northern part of New York in the United States and is the largest lake in Saint Lawrence County. The lake is south of the Saint Lawrence River and parallels the river for many miles.

Black Lake is of glacial origin, having been formed by the melting of continental glaciation in the state around 12,000 years ago.

Water flows into the lake from several sources, the largest being the Indian River. The lake drains into the Oswegatchie River and then into the Saint Lawrence River. The northeast end of the lake is south of Ogdensburg, New York.

The Mohawk people referred to the lake as Kanientàrhón:tsi, which translates to "lake is black".

== Description ==
The lake reaches a maximum depth of 40 feet (12 m). There are at least 26 named islands in the lake.

== Fishing ==
The water is brown stained and at times visibility gets down to under 2 feet. There are many species of fish present in the lake such as largemouth bass, smallmouth bass, walleye, northern pike, black crappie, bluegill, yellow perch, brown bullhead, muskellunge. Some have come across sturgeons. Historically, longnose gar, Lepisosteus osseus, had a naturally reproducing population in the lake.

== Notable people from the area ==
- George A. Mitchell, founder of Cadillac, Michigan
