= Smithville, New York =

- Town

- Location within the state of New York
- Coordinates: 42°25′25″N 75°45′14″W
- Country: United States
- State: New York
- County: Chenango

Government
  - Type: Town Council
  - Town Supervisor: Allan I. Johnson (R)
  - Town Council: Members' List: • Roger J. Connelly (R); • Holly A. Mohr (Another Choice); • Elizabeth A. Vanderweyde (D); • Charles J. Schultes (R)

Area
  - Total: 50.93 sq mi (131.90 km^{2})
  - Land: 50.44 sq mi (130.65 km^{2})
  - Water: 0.48 sq mi (1.25 km^{2})
- Elevation: 1,510 ft (460 m)

Population (2010)
  - Total: 1,330
  - Estimate (2016): 1,296
  - Density: 25.7/sq mi (9.92/km^{2})
- Time zone: UTC-5 (Eastern (EST))
  - Summer (DST): UTC-4 (EDT)
- ZIP Codes: 13841 (Smithville Flats); 13778 (Greene); 13801 (McDonough); 13830 (Oxford)
- Area code: 607
- FIPS code: 36-017-68055
- GNIS feature ID: 0979499
- Website: www.smithvilleny.gov

Smithville is a town in Chenango County, New York, United States. The population was 1,330 at the 2010 census. The town is at the western border of Chenango County, west of the city of Norwich.

== History ==
The land was first settled around 1797. The town of Smithville was founded from part of the town of Greene in 1808.

The population of Smithville in 1865 was 1,634.

The Smithville Valley Grange No. 1397 was listed on the National Register of Historic Places in 1998.

== Geography ==
According to the United States Census Bureau, the town has a total area of 50.9 square miles (131.9 km^{2}), of which 50.5 square miles (130.7 km^{2}) is land and 0.46 square miles (1.2 km^{2}), or 0.94%, is water.

The western town line is the border of Broome and Cortland counties.

New York State Route 41 intersects New York State Route 220 north of Smithville Flats.

== Demographics ==
Historical population
Census	Pop.	Note	%±
1820	1,553		—
1830	1,829		17.8%
1840	1,762		−3.7%
1850	1,771		0.5%
1860	1,661		−6.2%
1870	1,405		−15.4%
1880	1,492		6.2%
1890	1,318		−11.7%
1900	1,105		−16.2%
1910	949		−14.1%
1920	843		−11.2%
1930	831		−1.4%
1940	805		−3.1%
1950	845		5.0%
1960	891		5.4%
1970	956		7.3%
1980	1,174		22.8%
1990	1,167		−0.6%
2000	1,347		15.4%
2010	1,330		−1.3%
2016 (est.)	1,296		−2.6%
U.S. Decennial Census

As of the census of 2000, there were 1,347 people, 492 households, and 364 families residing in the town. The population density was 26.7 inhabitants per square mile (10.3/km^{2}). There were 672 housing units at an average density of 13.3 per square mile (5.1/km^{2}). The racial makeup of the town was 97.62% White, 0.52% African American, 0.30% Native American, 0.30% Asian, 0.07% from other races, and 1.19% from two or more races. Hispanic or Latino of any race were 0.89% of the population.

There were 492 households, out of which 35.0% had children under the age of 18 living with them, 59.6% were married couples living together, 9.6% had a female householder with no husband present, and 26.0% were non-families. 18.9% of all households were made up of individuals, and 5.5% had someone living alone who was 65 years of age or older. The average household size was 2.72 and the average family size was 3.09.

In the town, the population was spread out, with 27.0% under the age of 18, 7.0% from 18 to 24, 27.8% from 25 to 44, 28.0% from 45 to 64, and 10.2% who were 65 years of age or older. The median age was 38 years. For every 100 females, there were 111.5 males. For every 100 females age 18 and over, there were 105.6 males.

The median income for a household in the town was $35,972, and the median income for a family was $37,361. Males had a median income of $28,867 versus $24,063 for females. The per capita income for the town was $15,074. About 6.8% of families and 9.7% of the population were below the poverty line, including 9.7% of those under age 18 and 4.5% of those age 65 or over.

== Communities and locations in Smithville ==
- Adams Corner – A hamlet north of Smithville Center.
- Buckley Hollow – A location in the southeastern part of the town near the eastern town line.
- Corbin Corner – A hamlet north of Adams Corner near the northern town line.
- Dibble Corner – A hamlet in the northeastern part of the town, northeast of Smithville Center.
- East Smithville – A former community in the town.
- Genegantslet Creek – An important stream in the town. It is a tributary of the Chenango River and part of the Susquehanna River watershed.
- Lakeview – A hamlet at the western town line by Cortland County on NY Route 41.
- Lakeville – A hamlet near the western town line and near Cortland County on NY-41.
- Long Pond – A lake located east of Lakeville.
- Seebers Tavern – A bar in Smithville.
- Smithville General Store – A small store along the main street, across from Seebers Tavern.
- Smithville Center – A hamlet in the eastern part of the town.
- Smithville Flats – A hamlet and census-designated place in the southwestern section of the town on NY-41 and Genegantslet Creek.
- Tyner – A hamlet near the eastern town line on County Road 3, east of Smithville Center.
- Wilcox Corner – A location between Smithville Flats and Smithville Center.
