= United States Post Office (Oxford, New York) =

- US Post Office-Oxford
- U.S. National Register of Historic Places
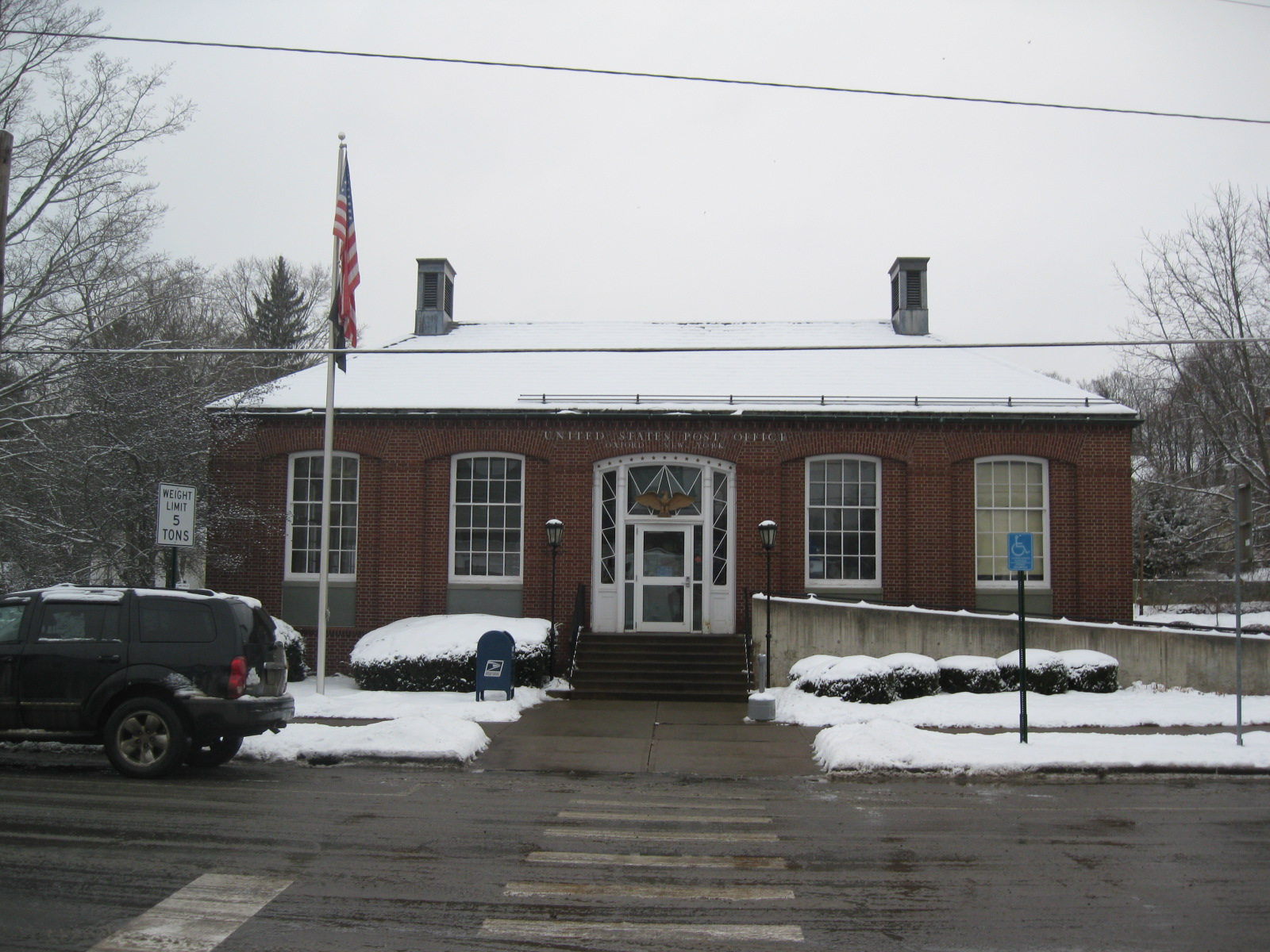
- U.S. Post Office, December 2009

- Location within New York Location within the United States
- Location: 2 S. Washington Ave., Oxford, New York
- Coordinates: 42°26′32″N 75°35′56″W
- Area: less than one acre
- Built: 1939
- Architect: Louis A. Simon, Mordi Gassner
- Architectural style: Colonial Revival
- MPS: US Post Offices in New York State, 1858-1943, TR
- NRHP reference No.: 88002392
- Added to NRHP: May 11, 1989

US Post Office-Oxford is a historic post office building located at Oxford in Chenango County, New York, United States. It was built in 1939–1940, and is one of a number of post offices in New York State designed by the Office of the Supervising Architect of the Treasury Department under Louis A. Simon.

It is a one-story, five-bay, steel-frame structure on a raised, poured-concrete foundation with a molded-brick watercourse. It's square, with a slate-covered hipped roof in the Colonial Revival style. The interior features a 1941 mural by Mordi Gassner titled Family Reunion on Clark Island: Spring 1791. It is located within the Oxford Village Historic District.

It was listed on the National Register of Historic Places in 1989.
