= McDonough, New York =

- Town
- Motto: "The hills o' McDonough are calling you home"

- Location within the state of New York
- Coordinates: 42°30′6″N 75°43′42″W
- Country: United States
- State: New York
- County: Chenango

Government
  - Type: Town Council
  - Town Supervisor: Arrington J. Canor (R)
  - Town Council: Members' List: • John F. Tracy (D); • Penny L. Beckwith (R); • Leon K. Barrows (R); • Harvey W. DeForest (R)

Area
  - Total: 39.63 sq mi (102.64 km^{2})
  - Land: 39.04 sq mi (101.11 km^{2})
  - Water: 0.59 sq mi (1.53 km^{2})
- Elevation: 1,726 ft (526 m)

Population (2010)
  - Total: 886
  - Estimate (2019): 847
  - Density: 22.1/sq mi (8.52/km^{2})
- Time zone: UTC-5 (Eastern (EST))
  - Summer (DST): UTC-4 (EDT)
- ZIP Codes: 13801 (McDonough); 13830 (Oxford); 13815 (Norwich)
- Area code: 607
- FIPS code: 36-017-44127
- GNIS feature ID: 0979178
- Website: www.mcdonoughny.gov

McDonough is a town in Chenango County, New York, United States. The population was 886 at the 2010 census. The town is named after Thomas Macdonough, a naval officer who served on Lake Champlain and other locations. McDonough is located in the western part of Chenango County, west of Norwich.

== History ==
The land was settled around 1795 by Sylvanius Moore. The town of McDonough was founded in 1816 from part of the town of Preston.

Calvary Episcopal Church was listed on the National Register of Historic Places in 1998.

== Geography ==
According to the United States Census Bureau, the town has a total area of 39.6 square miles (102.6 km^{2}), of which 39.0 square miles (101.1 km^{2}) is land and 0.58 square miles (1.5 km^{2}), or 1.50%, is water. The water area comes from several small lakes in the town, including Genegantslet Lake, Bowman Lake, and Lake Ludlow.

New York State Route 220 is a highway following a meandering course through the town, leading southeast to Oxford and southwest to Smithville Flats.

== Demographics ==
Historical population
Census	Pop.	Note	%±
1820	789		—
1830	1,232		56.1%
1840	1,369		11.1%
1850	1,522		11.2%
1860	1,483		−2.6%
1870	1,280		−13.7%
1880	1,298		1.4%
1890	1,025		−21.0%
1900	907		−11.5%
1910	813		−10.4%
1920	765		−5.9%
1930	598		−21.8%
1940	675		12.9%
1950	709		5.0%
1960	639		−9.9%
1970	703		10.0%
1980	796		13.2%
1990	809		1.6%
2000	870		7.5%
2010	886		1.8%
2019 (est.)	847		−4.4%
U.S. Decennial Census

As of the census of 2000, there were 870 people, 349 households, and 248 families residing in the town. The population density was 22.2 inhabitants per square mile (8.6/km^{2}). There were 590 housing units at an average density of 15.1 per square mile (5.8/km^{2}). The racial makeup of the town was 96.09% White, 1.26% African American, 0.34% Native American, 0.34% Asian, 0.11% from other races, and 1.84% from two or more races. Hispanic or Latino of any race were 2.53% of the population.

There were 349 households, out of which 28.4% had children under the age of 18 living with them, 59.9% were married couples living together, 6.6% had a female householder with no husband present, and 28.7% were non-families. 23.2% of all households were made up of individuals, and 10.9% had someone living alone who was 65 years of age or older. The average household size was 2.49 and the average family size was 2.93.

In the town, the population was spread out, with 22.3% under the age of 18, 8.5% from 18 to 24, 27.0% from 25 to 44, 26.3% from 45 to 64, and 15.9% who were 65 years of age or older. The median age was 40 years. For every 100 females, there were 101.9 males. For every 100 females age 18 and over, there were 101.8 males.

The median income for a household in the town was $29,402, and the median income for a family was $33,125. Males had a median income of $26,974 versus $19,231 for females. The per capita income for the town was $15,558. About 7.7% of families and 9.8% of the population were below the poverty line, including 10.8% of those under age 18 and 12.1% of those age 65 or over.

== Communities and locations in McDonough ==
- Bowman Lake State Park – A state park north of East McDonough.
- East McDonough – A hamlet on NY-220 in the eastern part of the town.
- Genegantslet Lake – A privately owned and maintained lake in the northwestern part of the town.
- Lake Ludlow – A lake in the southern part of the town.
- McDonough – The hamlet of McDonough is on NY-220 at the junction of County Roads 5, 7, and 8 in the western part of the town
