= General McNeil =

General McNeil or McNeill may refer to:

- Clarence H. McNeil (1873–1947), U.S. Army major general
- John McNeil (1813–1891), Union Army brigadier general and brevet major general
- John McNeil Jr. (1784–1850), U.S. Army brevet brigadier general
- Joseph McNeil (1942–2025), U.S. Air Force major general
- Dan K. McNeill (born 1946), U.S. Army four-star general
- John McNeill (British Army officer) (1831–1904), British Army major general
- Hugo MacNeill (Irish Army officer) (1900–1963), Irish National Army major general
