= New York State Veterans' Home at Oxford =

Old soldiers' home near Oxford village, New York

Coordinates: 42.447618°N 75.576648°W

The New York State Veterans' Home at Oxford (formerly the New York State Woman's Relief Corps Home) is an old soldiers' home located east of the village of Oxford in Chenango County, New York. The home was established for American Civil War veterans and their wives so they would not be separated in old age. The Woman's Relief Corps (W.R.C.) was an auxiliary of the Grand Army of the Republic Civil War veterans organization. In the 1890s the Woman's Relief Corps campaigned for the establishment of a co-ed old soldiers' home. Their efforts were rewarded in 1897 with the opening of the state soldiers' home just outside Oxford. By 1911 they had expanded to five buildings. By the 1970s it was decided to replace the old wood-frame hospital building with more modern facilities. The new one story main building was opened in 1981, but four "cottages" (older buildings) are also still available.

The home is located on New York State Route 220 and is situated east of the village of Oxford on hills with beautiful views overlooking the village and the Chenango River, and below the former New York, Ontario and Western Railroad. The veterans home is situated on 60 acres (240,000 m^{2}) and includes 242 beds. Residents receive state-of-the-art medical, nursing, psychosocial, and rehabilitation services. The home also has an affiliation with the Upstate Medical Center College of Medicine/Clinical Campus at Binghamton, New York.
