= New York State Route 220 =

State highway in Chenango County, New York, US

New York State Route 220
- NY 220 highlighted in red

Route information
- Maintained by NYSDOT
- Length: 20.81 mi (33.49 km)
- Existed: 1930–present

Major junctions
- West end: NY 41 in Smithville
- East end: CR 32 in Oxford

Location
- Country: United States
- State: New York
- Counties: Chenango

Highway system
- New York Highways; Interstate; US; State; Reference; Parkways
| ← US 220 | → NY 221 |

New York State Route 220 (NY 220) is a 20.81-mile-long (33.49 km) state highway located in Chenango County, New York, in the United States. It is signed as an east–west highway, but its actual routing wanders considerably from north to south as it proceeds across the county. The western terminus of NY 220 is at an intersection with NY 41 near the western county line in the town of Smithville. Its eastern terminus is in the town of Oxford, where it becomes County Route 32 (CR 32) east of the village of Oxford. The stub of NY 220 east of Oxford serves as a signed connection between NY 12 and the New York State Veterans' Home at Oxford located east of the village along the Chenango River.

In 1916, the New York State Legislature created Route 8-a, an unsigned legislative route connecting legislative Route 8 in the center of Oxford to the Relief Corps Home by way of the east bank of the Chenango River. The Route 8-a designation was removed in 1921 as part of a partial renumbering of New York's legislative routes. Its former routing became part of NY 220, a new route extending from Smithville Flats to Oxford, in the 1930 renumbering of state highways in New York. NY 220 was rerouted near Oxford in 1982 to follow a new bridge over the Chenango River. The realignment created a short overlap with NY 12 on North Canal Street between the former routing of NY 220 on Main Street and the new river crossing to the north. The 2017 route log erroneously shows that NY 220's eastern terminus is at the home to the junction with NY 12 in Oxford.

== Route description ==
NY 220 begins at an intersection with NY 41 north of the hamlet of Smithville Flats in the Chenango County town of Smithville. It heads to the northeast, paralleling a small creek as it progresses through the rural town consisting mostly of cultivated fields. NY 220 passes into the town of McDonough and enters a hamlet bearing the same name, where it turns eastward. The route winds its way through the eastern, forested portion of the town to the small community of East McDonough, located near the McDonough–Preston town line. Here, NY 220 turns southeast at Steere Road (unsigned NY 991A) and continues into Preston. Where NY 991A heads north to serve Bowman Lake State Park.

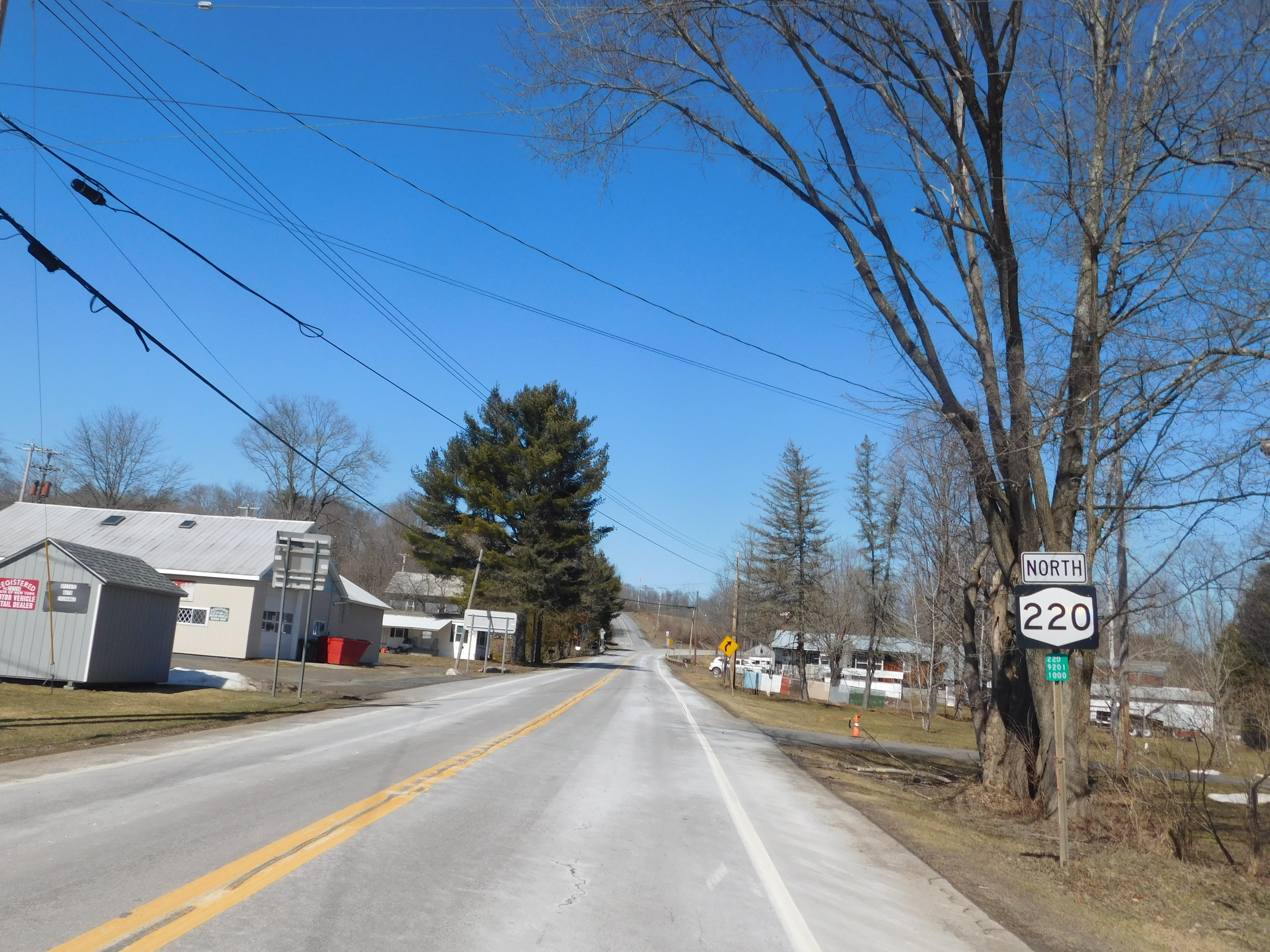
NY 220 north from NY 41 in Smithville Flats

In Preston, the open fields return as NY 220 follows another waterbody, this time the slightly larger Mill Brook. The route crosses the stream just before entering the town of Oxford, where they split. While Mill Brook curves around the western extents of the village of Oxford, NY 220 serves the village directly, entering it on Butler Street. It veers eastward at a junction with State Street and follows it to Washington Avenue. Here, State Street splits into a one-block long one-way couplet. Eastbound NY 220 shifts south to follow LaFayette Park; NY 220 westbound, meanwhile, is routed on State Street. At the end of the couplet, NY 220 intersects NY 12 (North Canal Street) on the western bank of the Chenango River.

NY 220 turns north onto NY 12, overlapping the latter for just over 0.5 miles (0.8 km) to an intersection with North Washington Avenue north of the village. The routes split here, with NY 220 turning southeast to cross the Chenango River and the New York, Susquehanna and Western Railroad (NYSW). Past the railroad, NY 220 heads through unimproved fields to a junction with East River Road. The route turns northeast here to follow East River Road. It heads through a small residential neighborhood to the New York State Veterans' Home at Oxford, a large old soldiers' home located adjacent to both the eastern bank of the Chenango River and the NYSW rail line. State maintenance of NY 220 ends just east of the driveway to the home, at which point the road continues onward toward Norwich as CR 32.

== History ==
Original routing of NY 220 in Oxford

The New York State Woman's Relief Corps Home (now the New York State Veterans' Home at Oxford), an old soldiers' home dedicated to the care of soldiers and their immediate families, nurses employed by the United States Army, and widows and mothers of soldiers, was constructed on a 165-acre (67 ha) plot of land east of the village of Oxford and opened April 19, 1897. In 1916, the New York State Legislature created Route 8-a, an unsigned legislative route connecting the home to Route 8 (now NY 12) in Oxford by way of pre-existing highways. That year, the state of New York began a project to improve the 1.40-mile-long (2.25 km) highway. In all, the improvements cost just over $26,150 (equivalent to $420,268 in 2025). The improved roadway was accepted into the state highway system on March 20, 1919. Route 8-a left Route 8 in the center of Oxford and crossed the Chenango River on Main Street. On the opposite side of the river, it followed Albany Street and East River Road to the home, where it ended. The Route 8-a designation was eliminated on March 1, 1921, as part of a partial renumbering of the legislative route system.

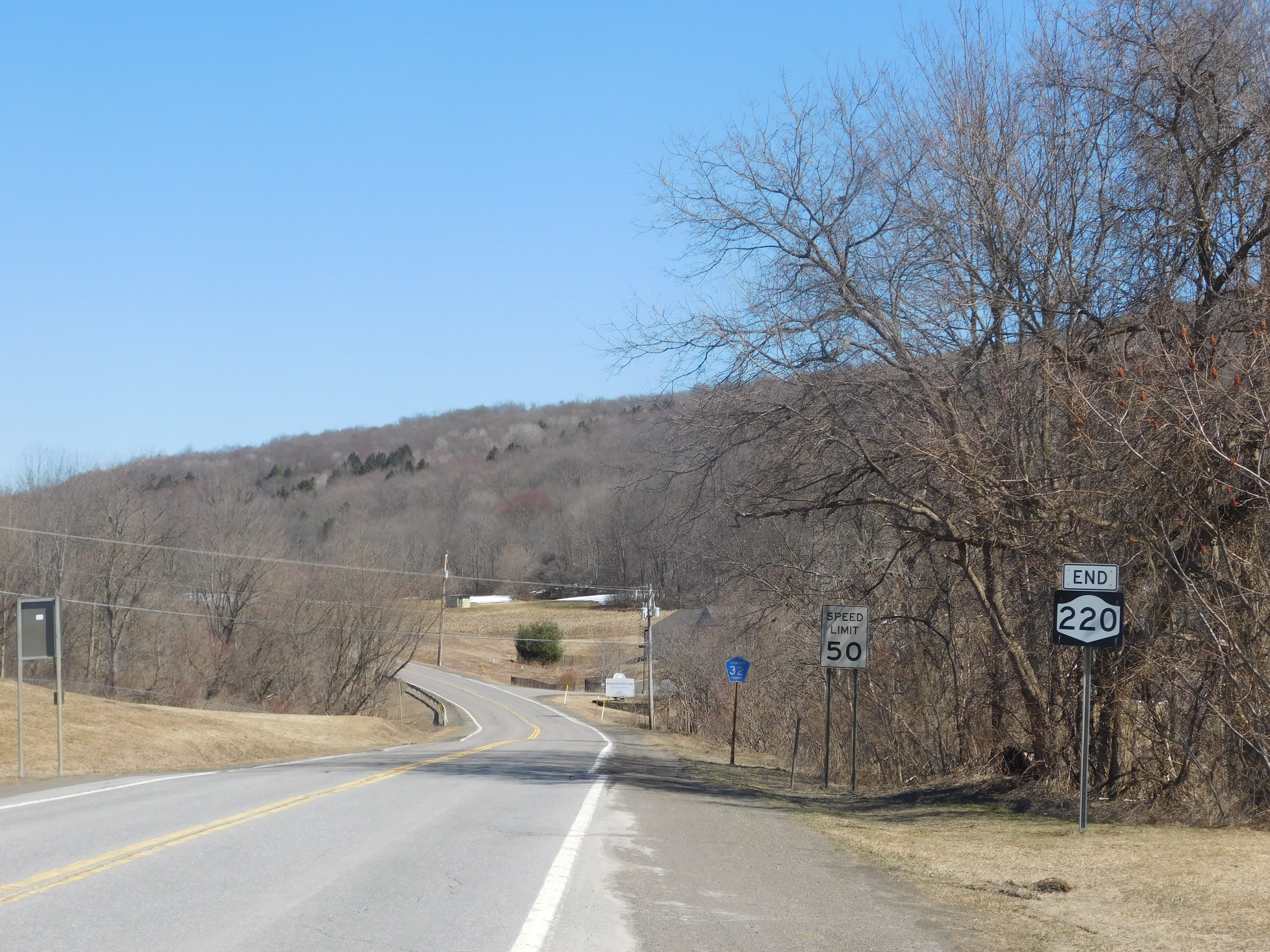
NY 220's terminus in Oxford

When the first set of posted routes in New York were assigned in 1924, the portion of Route 8 in the vicinity of Oxford became part of NY 12; however, the former routing of Route 8-a was not given a designation at this time. In the 1930 renumbering of state highways in New York, the former routing of Route 8-a became part of NY 220, a new route extending from Smithville Flats to Oxford via McDonough. The entirety of NY 220 west of Oxford was closed to traffic in July 1935 as a result of damage caused by severe statewide flooding earlier in the month. The portion of the route from McDonough to Oxford took approximately three days to repair and was reopened by July 17. The remaining section from Smithville Flats from McDonough was reopened by the following year.

By 1980, plans to construct a new bridge for NY 220 over the Chenango River had been set in motion. As planned, a 0.5-mile (0.8 km) stretch of NY 220 in Oxford would be rerouted to follow the new structure over the river and a Conrail (now New York, Susquehanna and Western Railroad) line that ran along the riverbank. The initial price tag for the bridge was set at $2.262 million (equivalent to $8.84 million in 2025). Construction of the bridge was completed in 1982, at which time NY 220 was rerouted to overlap NY 12 north to the bridge, where it turned east to cross the river and rejoin its former alignment on the east bank.

The 2017 route log erroneously shows that NY 220's eastern terminus is at the home to the junction with NY 12 in Oxford.

== Major intersections ==
The entire route is in Chenango County.

| Location | mi | km | Destinations | Notes |
|---|---|---|---|---|
| Smithville | 0.00 | 0.00 | NY 41 – Cortland, Smithville Flats, Greene | Western terminus; hamlet of Smithville Flats |
| McDonough | 13.06 | 21.02 | NY 991A (Steere Road) – Bowman Lake State Park | Southern terminus of unsigned NY 991A; hamlet of East McDonough |
| Village of Oxford | 19.26 | 31.00 | NY 12 south (South Canal Street) – Greene | Western terminus of NY 12 / NY 220 overlap |
| Village of Oxford | 19.90 | 32.03 | NY 12 north (North Canal Street) – Norwich | Eastern terminus of NY 12 / NY 220 overlap |
| Town of Oxford | 20.81 | 33.49 | CR 32 (East River Road) | End of state maintenance at the New York State Veterans' Home at Oxford |
1.000 mi = 1.609 km; 1.000 km = 0.621 mi: Concurrency terminus
