= Smithville Valley Grange No. 1397 =

- U.S. National Register of Historic Places
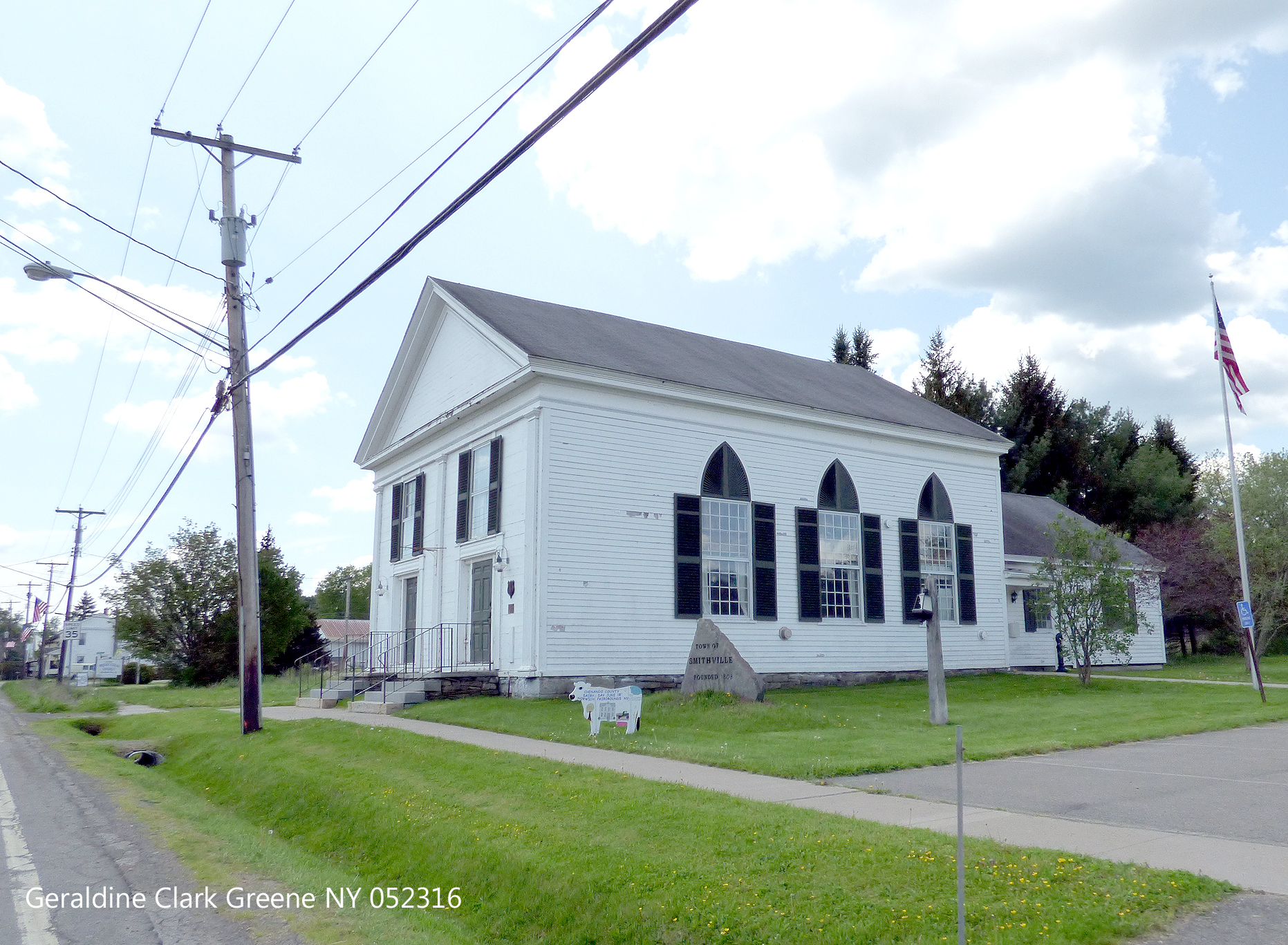

- Location within New York Location within the United States
- Location: NY 41, Smithville Flats, New York
- Coordinates: 42°23′57″N 75°48′33″W
- Area: less than one acre
- Built: 1842
- Architectural style: Greek Revival
- NRHP reference No.: 98001009
- Added to NRHP: August 6, 1998

Smithville Valley Grange No. 1397, also known as First Universalist Society Church and Smithville Community Center, is a historic grange hall at Smithville Flats in Chenango County, New York. It was built in 1842 as a church and converted for use as a grange hall in 1921. The building is in the Greek Revival style.

It was added to the National Register of Historic Places in 1998.
