= Bowman Lake State Park =

State park in Chenango County, New York

- Location within New York
- Interactive map of Bowman Lake State Park
- Type: State park
- Location: 745 Bliven Sherman Road; Oxford, New York
- Nearest city: Oxford, New York
- Coordinates: 42°31′N 75°41′W
- Area: 653 acres (2.64 km^{2})
- Created: 1966
- Operator: New York State Office of Parks, Recreation and Historic Preservation
- Visitors: 69,037 (in 2020)
- Open: All year
- Camp sites: 188
- Website: Bowman Lake State Park

Bowman Lake State Park is a 653-acre (2.64 km^{2}) state park located in Chenango County, New York. The park is located in the Town of McDonough, north of the community of East McDonough.

== History ==
The land that was to become Bowman Lake State Park was originally part of the region's reforestation lands, which were acquired by the state beginning in 1929. Under the management of the New York Conservation Department, 200 campsites were established around Bowman Lake in 1962, in addition to a day use area, sand beach, and boat launch. The property was transferred to the State Parks and Recreation Commission in 1966 to be operated as a state park.

== Park description ==
Bowman Lake State Park features one of the largest campgrounds in central New York, containing 188 campsites for tents and trailers, as well as several rustic cabins. The park's facilities also include a boat launch, a beach, picnic tables, and a nature center. Trails are available for hiking, biking, cross-country skiing, and snowmobiling. The Finger Lakes Trail also passes through the park.

The park's namesake lake is 35 acres (0.14 km^{2}) in size and is annually stocked with trout; two additional ponds of similar size are also found within the park, offering opportunities for fishing and ice fishing. A variety of wildlife, including 103 species of birds, may be viewed at the park.

== See also ==
- List of New York state parks
