= Charles Benjamin Dudley =

American chemist

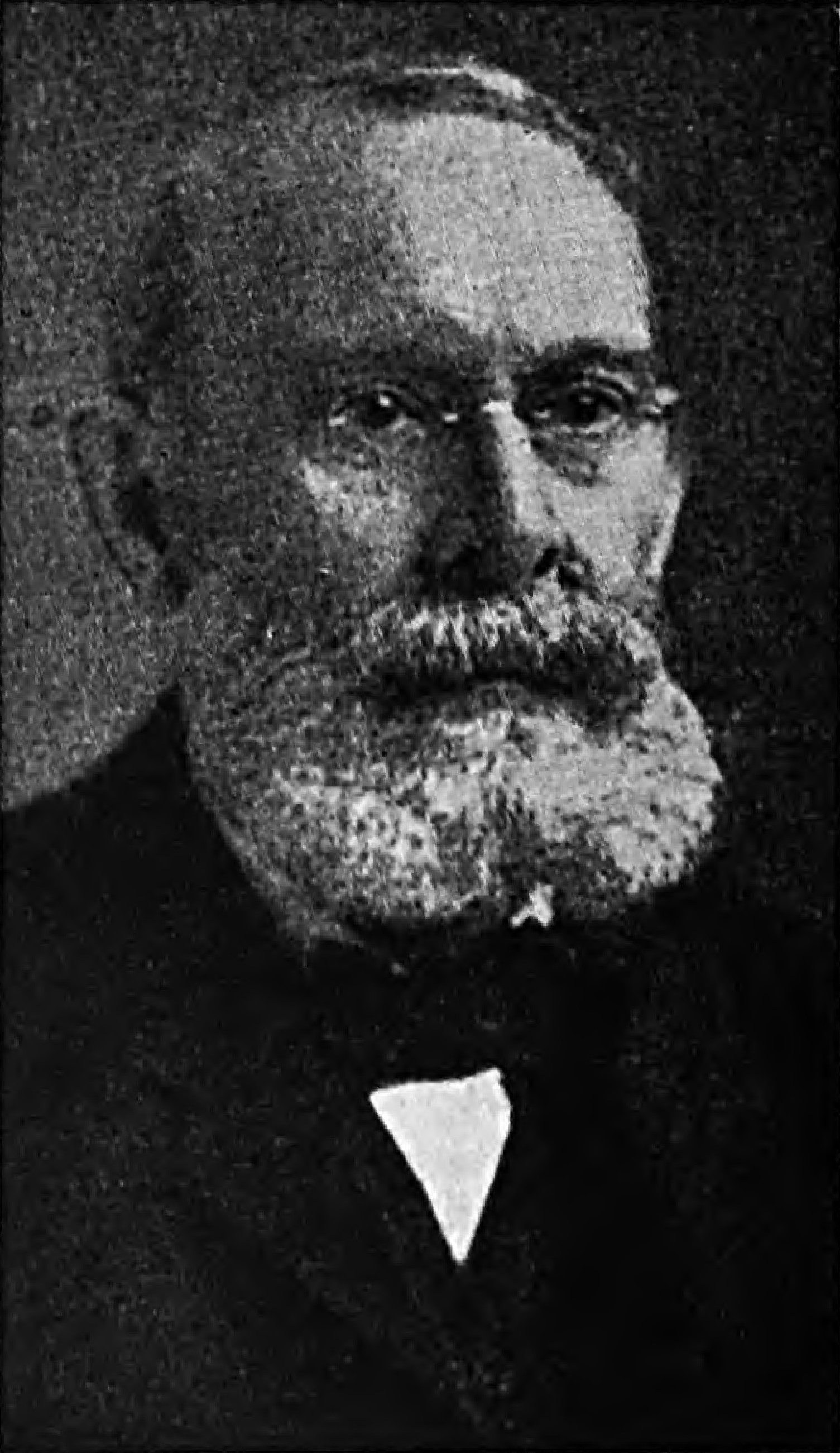
- Born: July 14, 1842; Oxford, New York
- Died: December 21, 1909 (aged 67); Altoona, Pennsylvania
- Education: Yale University (B.A., Ph.D.)
- Occupation: Chemist
- Known for: standardisation

Charles Benjamin Dudley (July 14, 1842 – December 21, 1909) was an American chemist who was an early proponent of standardisation in industry.

Dudley was born in Oxford, New York, and owing to family circumstances, had to wait until 1867 before he could enter Yale College, supporting himself as a night editor on the New Haven Palladium newspaper. After graduating with a B.A. degree in 1871, he eventually earned a Ph.D. from the Sheffield Scientific School in 1874.

In 1875, he became a chemist for the Pennsylvania Railroad and started to investigate the chemical composition and metallurgical structure of rail tracks, breakage being a major hazard at that time. He discovered enormous variation in the properties and quality of steel and the 1878 publication of his results caused an uproar in the steel industry, who saw it as their sole domain to determine the quality of their products for sale. Dudley championed the development of the company and industry standards and demanded rigorous testing of materials to verify conformity. He developed a complete range of standards for the Pennsylvania Railroad, not only for steel, but also for fuels, lubricants, paints, and even locomotives.

In 1879, Dudley was elected as a member to the American Philosophical Society.

In 1882, he was made a fellow of the American Association for the Advancement of Science.

In 1896 and 1897, Dudley served as president of the American Chemical Society.

In 1898, he was one of the founders of the American Society for Testing and Materials (ASTM), becoming president from 1902 to 1908.

He died in Altoona, Pennsylvania.

== Honours ==
- Member of Phi Beta Kappa;
- President of the ASTM, (1902-1909).

== Bibliography ==
- [Anon.] (2001) "Dudley, Charles Benjamin", Encyclopædia Britannica, Deluxe Edition CD-ROM
- Dudley, C. B. (1878) "The chemical composition and physical properties of steel rails", Transactions of the American Institute of Mining Engineers
