= Loomis Family Farm =

- U.S. National Register of Historic Places
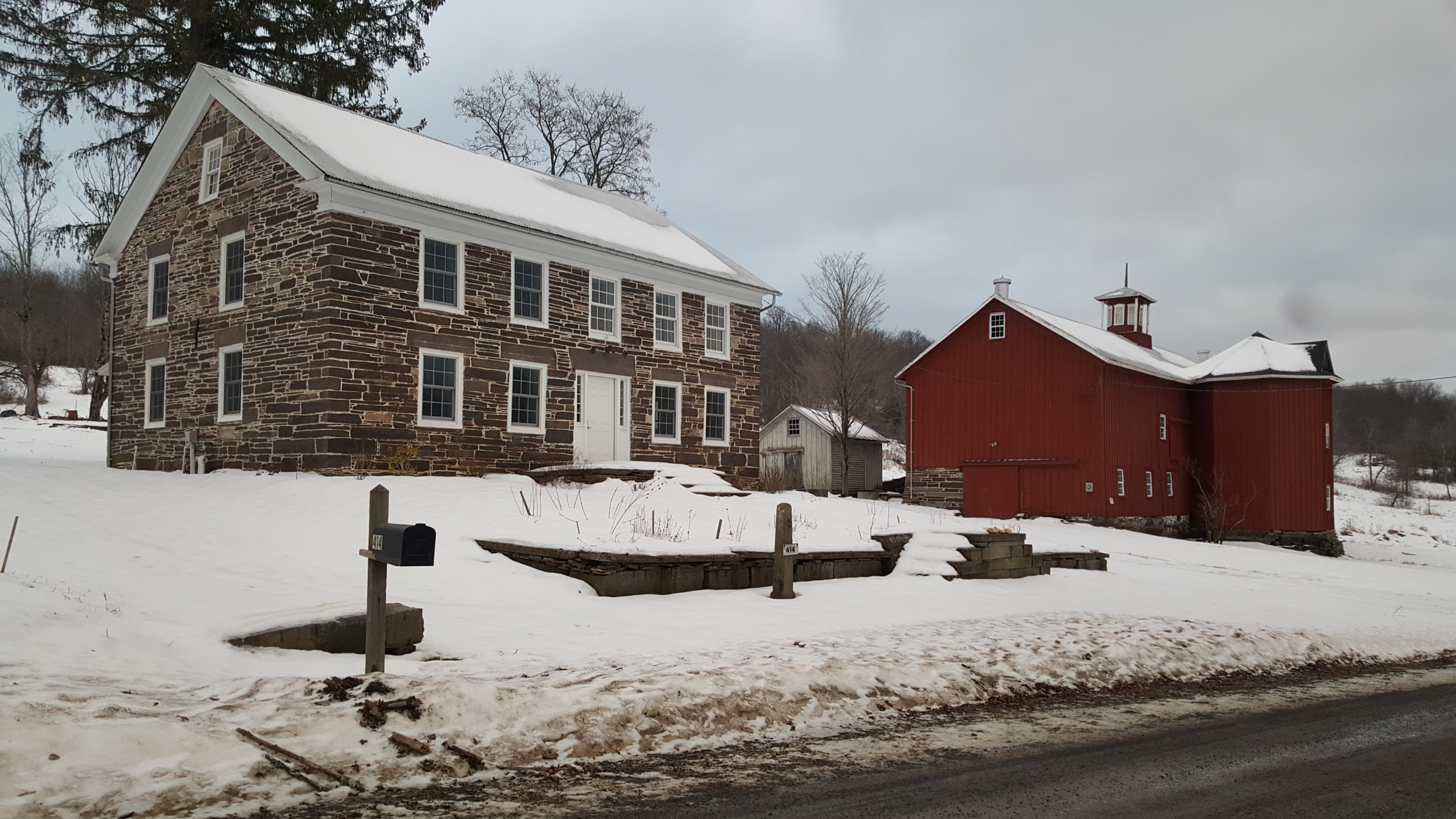

- Location within New York Location within the United States
- Location: 414 S. Tyner Rd., Oxford, New York
- Coordinates: 42°25′27″N 75°39′58″W
- Area: 140.9 acres (57.0 ha)
- Built: 1832, c. 1879
- Architectural style: Early Republic
- NRHP reference No.: 14000329
- Added to NRHP: June 13, 2014

Loomis Family Farm, also known as the Loomis-Sharpe Farm, is a historic home and farm located at Oxford, Chenango County, New York. The farmhouse was built in 1832 and is a two-story, five-bay sandstone residence with a center entrance. Also on the property are the contributing dairy barn and silo (c. 1879), a carriage barn (c. 1870s), a corn crib / granary (c. 1871), a small barn (c. 1870s), a smokehouse, a spring-fed water trough, a well with a stone lid, a milk cooler, a stone horse barn foundation, and the ruins of a sugar house.

It was added to the National Register of Historic Places in 2014.
