= Long Pond (Chenango County, New York) =

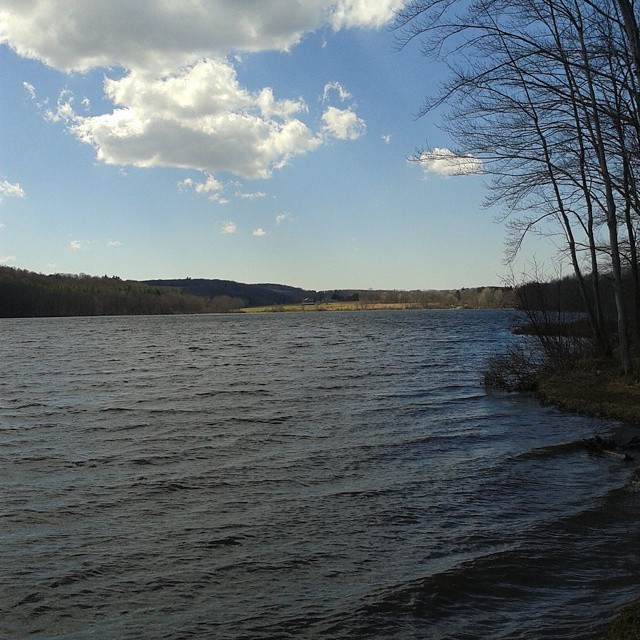
- Long Pond in 2015

- Location within New York Location within the United States
- Location: Chenango County, New York, United States
- Coordinates: 42°24′55″N 75°50′00″W
- Type: Lake
- Basin countries: United States
- Surface area: 115 acres (0.47 km^{2})
- Average depth: 6 feet (1.8 m)
- Max. depth: 15 ft (4.6 m)
- Shore length^{1}: 2.5 miles (4.0 km)
- Surface elevation: 1,237 ft (377 m)
- Islands: 3
- Settlements: Lakeville, New York
- ^{1} Shore length is not a well-defined measure.

Long Pond is a lake located by Lakeville, New York. Fish species present in the lake include bluegill, pumpkinseed sunfish, tiger muskie, brown bullhead, yellow perch, black crappie, largemouth bass, and pickerel. There is access via state owned boat launch off NY-41, east of Lakeville.
