= Calvary Episcopal Church (McDonough, New York) =

Historic church in New York, United States

- U.S. National Register of Historic Places
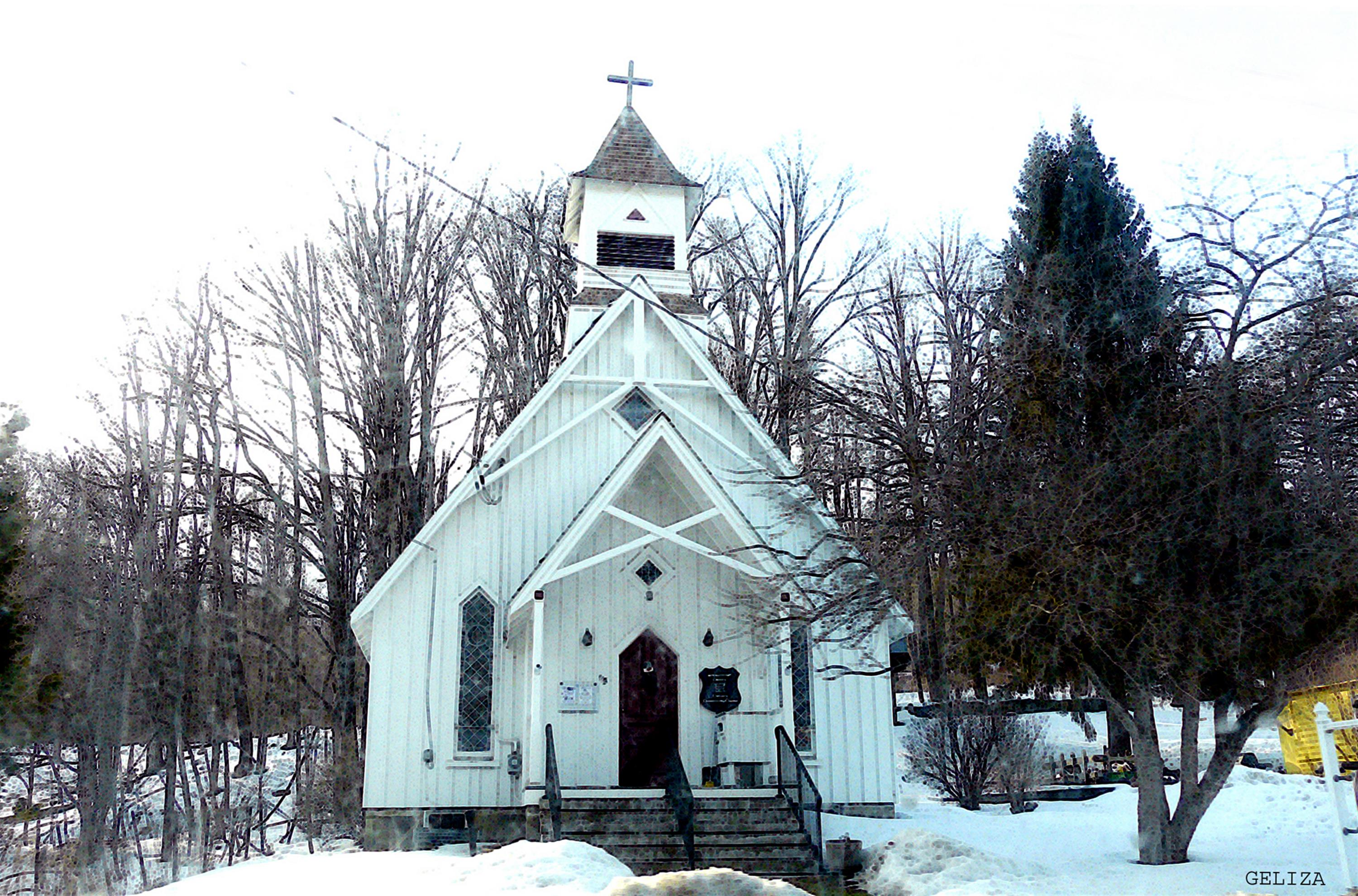
- The former Calvary Episcopal Church and Library

- Location within New York Location within the United States
- Location: North St., W of Moon Hill Rd., McDonough, New York
- Coordinates: 42°29′58″N 75°46′5″W
- Area: less than one acre
- Built: 1884
- Architectural style: Gothic Revival
- MPS: Historic Churches of the Episcopal Diocese of Central New York MPS
- NRHP reference No.: 98000130
- Added to NRHP: February 20, 1998

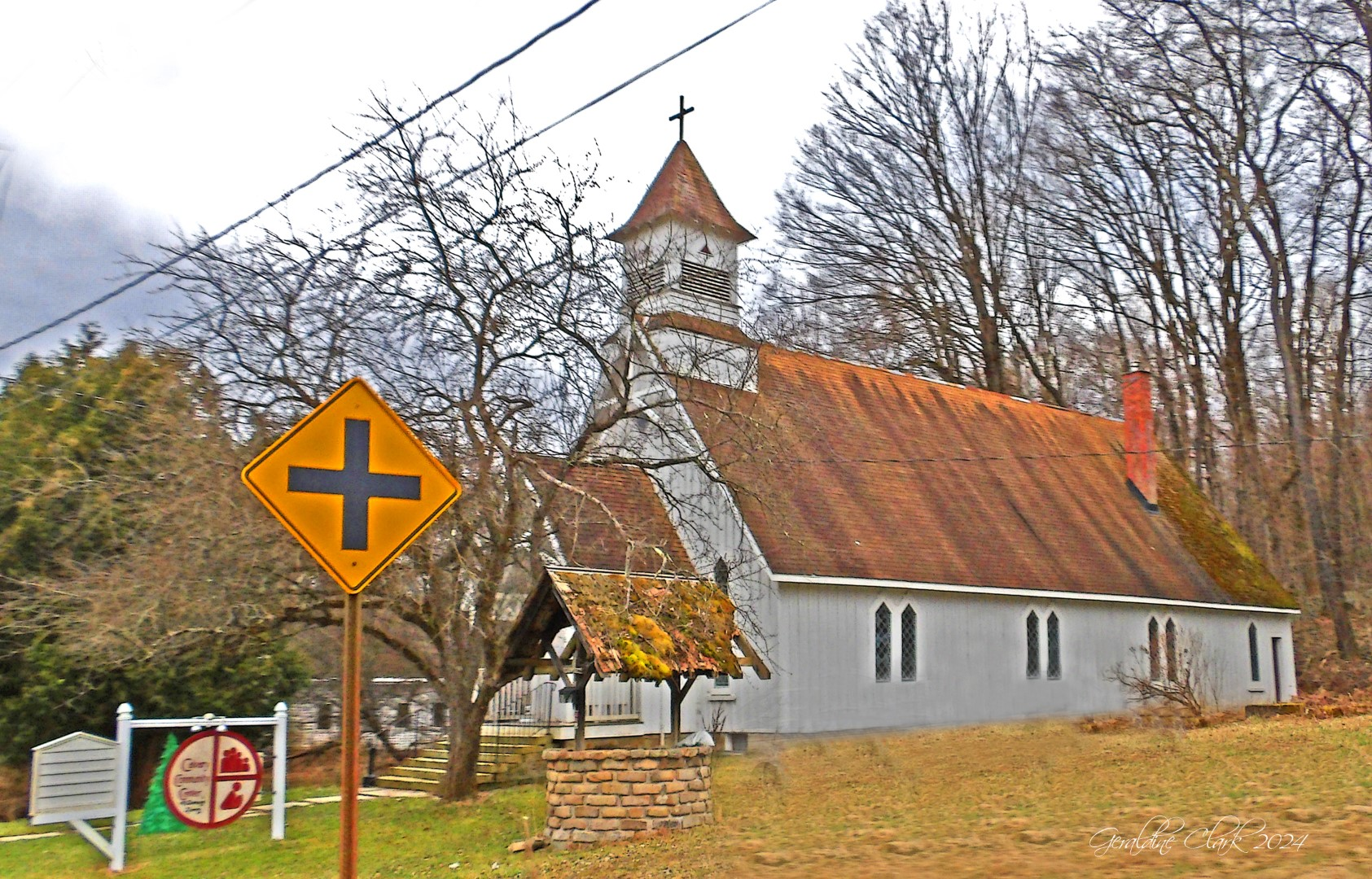
Pictured in March 2024.

Calvary Episcopal Church is a historic Episcopal church on North Street west of Moon Hill Road in McDonough, Chenango County, New York. It was built about 1884 and is a small, one story frame chapel in the Carpenter Gothic style. It is approximately 28 feet wide and 64 feet deep and features board and batten siding and a steep gable roof with bell tower.

It was added to the National Register of Historic Places in 1998.
