= Sannick Family Farm =

- U.S. National Register of Historic Places
- U.S. Historic district
- Location within New York Location within the United States
- Location: 129 Jordan Ln., South Oxford, New York
- Coordinates: 42.39132°N 75.61396°W
- Area: 71 acres (29 ha)
- NRHP reference No.: 07000335
- Added to NRHP: April 18, 2007

Sannick Family Farm is a national historic district and historic family farm located at South Oxford in Chenango County, New York. The district includes four contributing buildings, one contributing site, and two contributing structures. They include the farmhouse, corncrib / granary, bank barn, silo, and milk house.

It was added to the National Register of Historic Places in 2007.
