= Oxford Village Historic District =

Historic district in New York, United States

- U.S. National Register of Historic Places
- U.S. Historic district
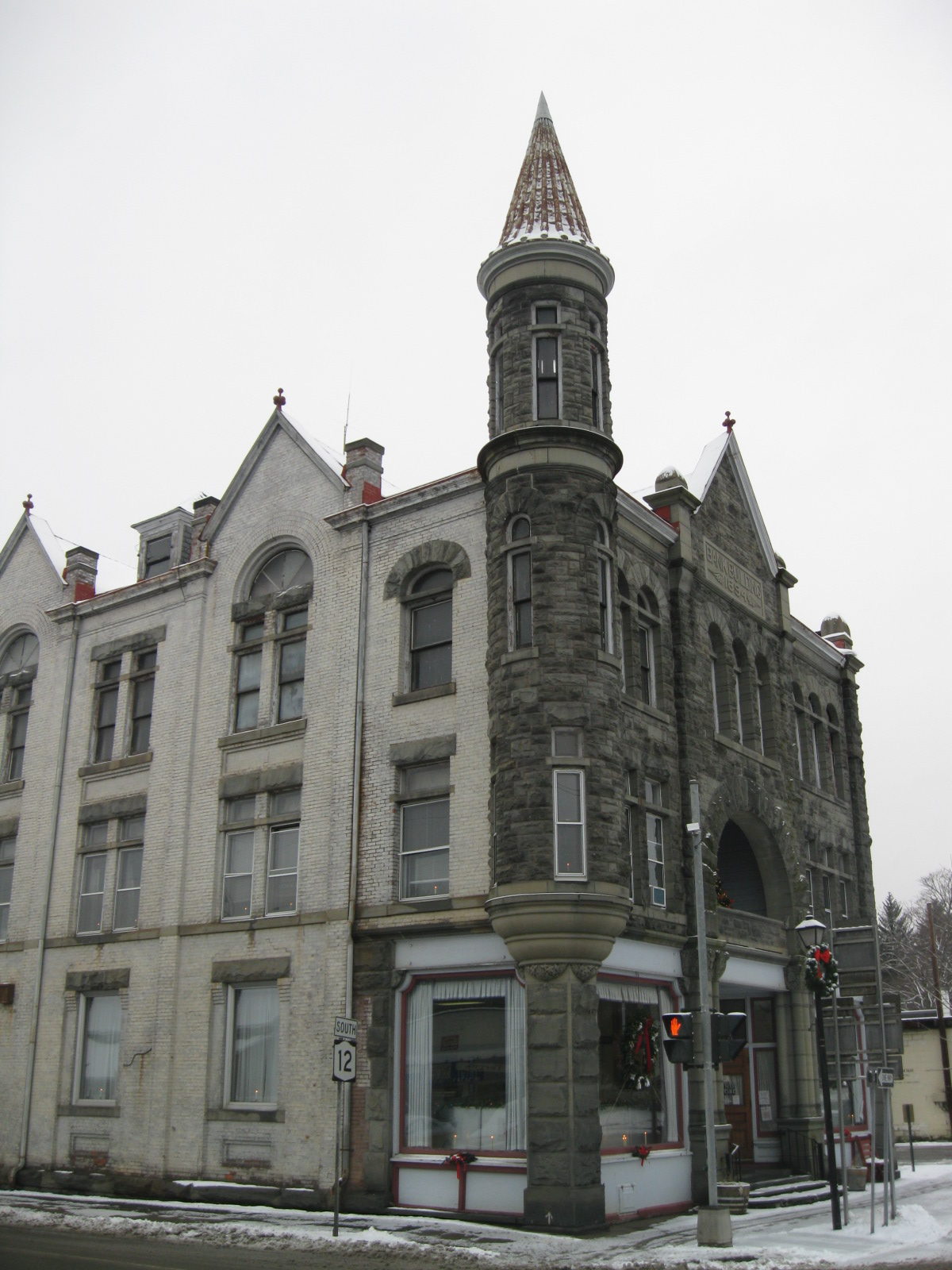
- First National Bank of Oxford building, December 2009

- Location within New York Location within the United States
- Location: Roughly Washington Ave., State St., Chenango River, Merchant & Green Sts., Washington Park, Albany & Pleasant Sts., Oxford, New York
- Coordinates: 42°26′27″N 75°35′40″W
- Area: 85 acres (34 ha)
- Built: 1794
- Architect: Multiple
- Architectural style: Greek Revival, Romanesque, Federal
- NRHP reference No.: 85002481
- Added to NRHP: September 17, 1985

Oxford Village Historic District is a national historic district located at Oxford in Chenango County, New York.

== Background ==
The district includes 201 contributing buildings and seven contributing structures. It encompasses the village's historic core and includes commercial, residential, civic, and ecclesiastical buildings. Among the notable buildings are the First National Bank of Oxford building (1894), James Clarke House building (remodeled 1914), Baptist Church (United Church of Oxford, 1824), and Gerritt Van Wagenen house (1824). Located within the district are the separately listed Theodore Burr House and US Post Office-Oxford. It was added to the National Register of Historic Places in 1985.
