= Smithville Flats, New York =

- Census-designated place
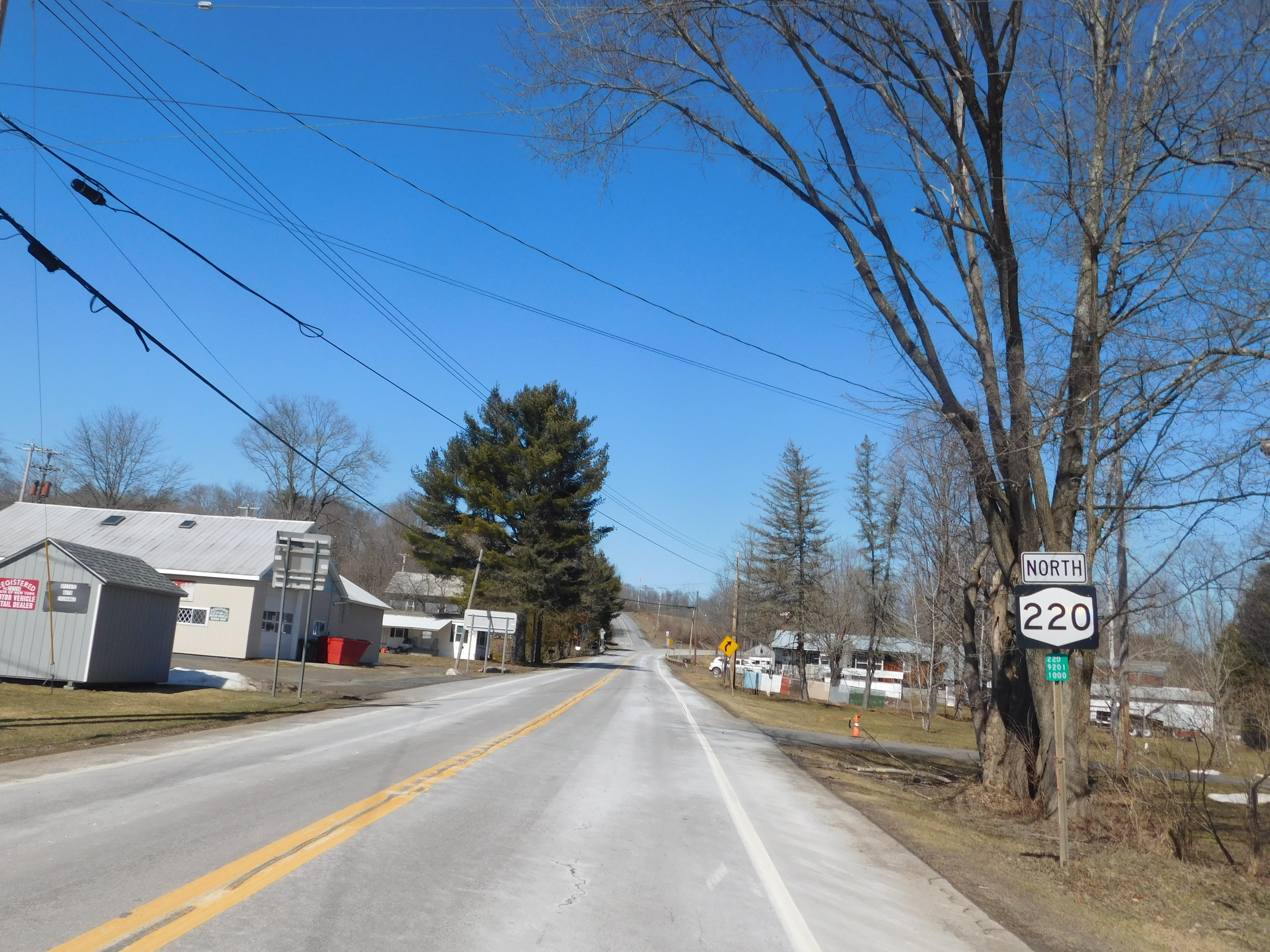
- New York State Route 220 northbound in Smithville Flats, New York.

- Location within New York
- Coordinates: 42°23′42″N 75°48′29″W
- Country: United States
- State: New York
- County: Chenango
- Town: Smithville

Area
  - Total: 1.42 sq mi (3.68 km^{2})
  - Land: 1.42 sq mi (3.68 km^{2})
  - Water: 0 sq mi (0.00 km^{2})
- Elevation: 1,024 ft (312 m)

Population (2020)
  - Total: 303
  - Density: 213.1/sq mi (82.27/km^{2})
- Time zone: UTC-5 (Eastern (EST))
  - Summer (DST): UTC-4 (EDT)
- ZIP code: 13841
- Area code: 607
- GNIS feature ID: 965536

Smithville Flats is a census-designated place and hamlet in the town of Smithville, Chenango County, New York, United States. The zipcode is 13841. As of the 2020 census, Smithville Flats had a population of 303.

== Demographics ==
In the 2020 census, Smithville Flats had 303 people, 164 households, and 158 housing units. The racial demographics were 92.7% White, 1.3% African American, 0.6% Asian, 0.6% from some other race, and 4.6% from two or more races. The median age was 38.4 years old. 11.9% of the population were 65 or older, 9.3% of the population were between the ages of 65 and 74, 2.0% between the ages of 75 and 84, and 0.6% were 85 or older.

The median income of Smithville Flats was $55,938. Families had a median income of $69,063 and non-families had a median income of $29,135. The CDP had a poverty rate of 11.9%. Children had a poverty rate of 20%, adults had a poverty rate of 9.1%, and seniors had a poverty rate of 7.3%.

The ancestry of the CDP was 26.2% Irish, 13.4% American, 11.9% Welsh, 7.6% English, 6.7% German, 3.8% Dutch, 3.5% Italian, and 2.3% West Indian.

Historical population
| Census | Pop. | Note | %± |
|---|---|---|---|
| 2020 | 303 | | — |
U.S. Decennial Census
