= Oxford, New York =

- Town
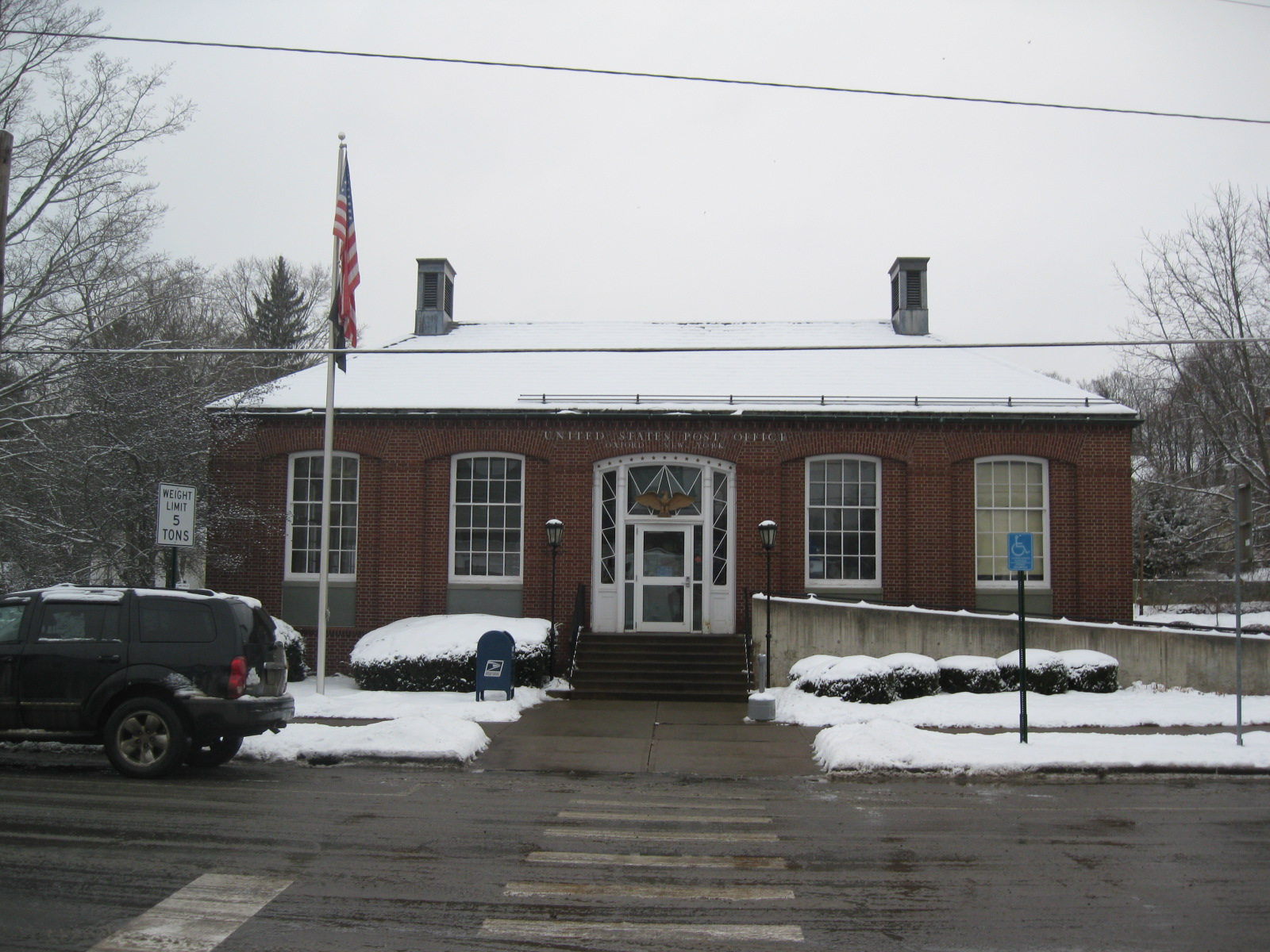
- U.S. Post Office, Oxford

- Location within the state of New York
- Coordinates: 42°24′22″N 75°35′30″W
- Country: United States
- State: New York
- County: Chenango

Government
  - Type: Town Council
  - Town Supervisor: Alan Davis
  - Town Council: Members' List: • John Weidman; • Ron Charles; • John Hofmann; • Carl Koenig

Area
  - Total: 60.41 sq mi (156.47 km^{2})
  - Land: 60.06 sq mi (155.56 km^{2})
  - Water: 0.35 sq mi (0.91 km^{2})
- Elevation: 1,499 ft (457 m)

Population (2010)
  - Total: 3,901
  - Estimate (2016): 3,811
  - Density: 63/sq mi (24.5/km^{2})
- Time zone: UTC-5 (Eastern (EST))
  - Summer (DST): UTC-4 (EDT)
- ZIP Codes: 13830 (Oxford); 13733 (Bainbridge); 13780 (Guilford); 13815 (Norwich)
- Area code: 607
- FIPS code: 36-017-55959
- GNIS feature ID: 0979335
- Website: www.townofoxfordny.gov

Oxford is a town in Chenango County, New York, United States. The town contains a village also named Oxford. Oxford is an interior town in the south-central part of the county, southwest of the city of Norwich. At the 2010 census the town population was 3,901. The name derives from that of the native town of an early landowner from New England.

== History ==
The town is within the former realm of the Oneida and Tuscarora people. A tract of land in the town was purchased by Benjamin Hovey, from Oxford, Massachusetts. The first settlers in Oxford arrived in the spring of 1789. Elijah Blackman, his son Jabez Blackman, and eleven-year-old adopted daughter Polly Knapp built a primitive log cabin on an island in the Chenango River. The little island on which the Blackman family had squatted had previously been bought by Benjamin Hovey, who when he came on later to take possession, gave them in consideration of the improvements made, a piece of land, a mile and a half up the river. Blackman resided there until his death, which occurred about the year 1825.

Perspective map of Oxford and list of landmarks from 1888 by L.R. Burleigh

The town of Oxford was established in 1793 from territory divided from the town of Bainbridge and the town of Union (now in Broome County). Oxford lost some of its territory when the town of Guilford was created in 1813, and the town of Coventry was formed in 1843.

The former Chenango Canal (1837) passed through the town. Railroad service began in 1870.

The Loomis Family Farm was added to the National Register of Historic Places in 2014.

== Geography ==
According to the United States Census Bureau, the town has a total area of 60.4 square miles (156.5 km^{2}), of which 60.1 square miles (155.6 km^{2}) is land and 0.35 square miles (0.9 km^{2}), or 0.58%, is water.

The Chenango River, a tributary of the Susquehanna River, flows southward through the town.

New York State Route 12 is a northeast–southwest highway through the town. New York State Route 220 intersects NY-12 in Oxford village.

== Demographics ==
Historical population
Census	Pop.	Note	%±
1820	2,317		—
1830	2,947		27.2%
1840	3,179		7.9%
1850	3,227		1.5%
1860	3,290		2.0%
1870	3,278		−0.4%
1880	3,035		−7.4%
1890	3,138		3.4%
1900	3,545		13.0%
1910	3,014		−15.0%
1920	2,871		−4.7%
1930	2,904		1.1%
1940	3,121		7.5%
1950	3,423		9.7%
1960	3,457		1.0%
1970	3,761		8.8%
1980	3,961		5.3%
1990	4,075		2.9%
2000	3,992		−2.0%
2010	3,901		−2.3%
2016 (est.)	3,811	▼	−2.3%
U.S. Decennial Census

As of the census of 2000, there were 3,992 people, 1,440 households, and 1,035 families residing in the town. The population density was 66.4 inhabitants per square mile (25.6/km^{2}). There were 1,800 housing units at an average density of 30.0 units per square mile (11.6 units/km^{2}). The racial makeup of the town was 97.72% White, 0.85% Black or African American, 0.33% Native American, 0.23% Asian, 0.10% Pacific Islander, 0.08% from other races, and 0.70% from two or more races. Hispanic or Latino of any race were 1.08% of the population.

There were 1,440 households, out of which 32.4% had children under the age of 18 living with them, 56.9% were married couples living together, 9.9% had a female householder with no husband present, and 28.1% were non-families. 22.9% of all households were made up of individuals, and 10.3% had someone living alone who was 65 years of age or older. The average household size was 2.56 and the average family size was 2.99.

In the town, the population was spread out, with 24.0% under the age of 18, 7.0% from 18 to 24, 23.7% from 25 to 44, 25.3% from 45 to 64, and 19.9% who were 65 years of age or older. The median age was 42 years. For every 100 females, there were 101.2 males. For every 100 females age 18 and over, there were 99.5 males.

The median income for a household in the town was $33,024, and the median income for a family was $37,639. Males had a median income of $28,169 versus $21,380 for females. The per capita income for the town was $16,149. About 9.4% of families and 13.6% of the population were below the poverty line, including 17.4% of those under age 18 and 7.1% of those age 65 or over.

== Communities and locations in the Town of Oxford ==
- Brackett Lake – A small lake in the southeastern part of the town.
- Cheshireville – A former community in the southern part of the town.
- Coventry Station – A location southwest of Oxford village and northwest of South Oxford.
- Ingraham Corners – A location northwest of Oxford village at the northern town line.
- Northrups Corners – A location south of Oxford village.
- Oxford – A village in the northern part of the town; located on Route NY-12 and NY220 by the Chenango River.
- Oxford Station – A location southeast of Oxford village, located on County Road 35.
- Puckerville Corners – A location near the eastern town line.
- South Oxford – A hamlet southwest of Oxford village, located on County Road 32 (East River Road). The Sannick Family Farm was listed on the National Register of Historic Places in 2007.
- Walker Corners – A location east of South Oxford hamlet.

== Notable people ==
- Frances R. Brown, college president
- Theodore Burr, inventor, engineer
- Charles Benjamin Dudley, chemist, proponent of industrial standardization and president of ASTM International from 1902 to 1908
- Maria Hyde Hibbard, born in Oxford; educator and temperance movement leader
- Clarence H. McNeil, U.S. Army major general, born and raised in Oxford
- Camille Paglia, author and academic
- Thomas Ryan, born in Oxford, congressman from Kansas
- Uri Tracy, missionary, founder of Oxford Academy, assemblyman and congressman
