= Clarence H. McNeil =

United States Army general

Clarence Henry McNeil
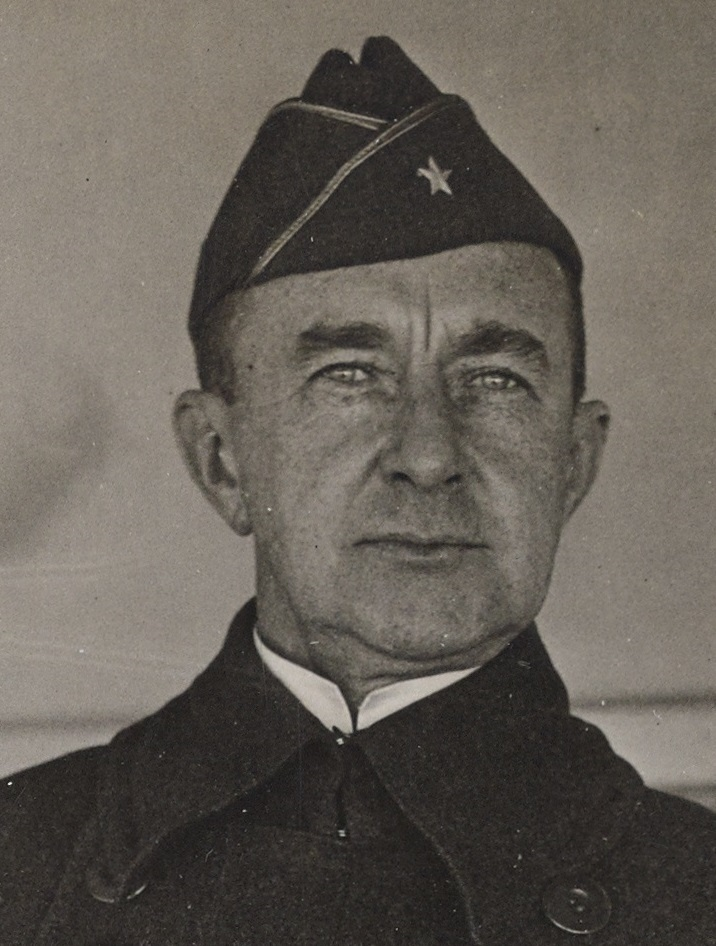
- National Archives photo of McNeil as commander of the 37th Coast Artillery Brigade in 1919
- Born: July 4, 1873; Oxford, New York
- Died: September 13, 1947 (aged 74); Berkeley, California
- Burial place: San Francisco National Cemetery
- Military career
- Allegiance: United States
- Branch: United States Army
- Service years: 1896–1922
- Rank: Brigadier General
- Commands: 66th Coast Artillery Regiment; 37th Coast Artillery Brigade; South Atlantic Coast Artillery District; Southeastern Department
- Conflicts: World War I

Clarence Henry McNeil (July 4, 1873 – September 13, 1947) was a U.S. Army brigadier general.

== Early life ==
Clarence Henry McNeil was born in Oxford, New York on July 4, 1873, the son of Millard D. and Mary (Flagg) McNeil. He was raised and educated in Oxford, and graduated from Oxford Academy. He then began attendance at the United States Military Academy, from which he graduated in 1896 ranked eleventh of seventy-three.

== Military career ==
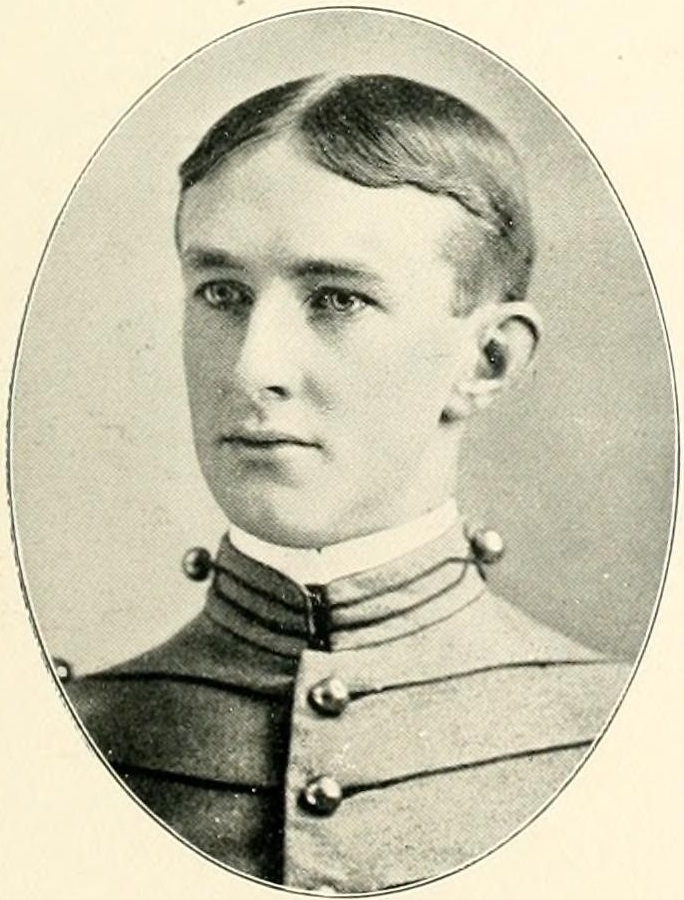
from 1902's A military album, containing over one thousand portraits of commissioned officers who served in the Spanish-American war

McNeil was commissioned in the artillery stationed at Fort Slocum, New York, and was transferred to Key West Barracks, Florida, to Fort Hamilton and Fort Wadsworth, New York, back to Florida, to Washington Barracks, Washington, D.C., and to Fort Hancock, New Jersey. McNeil was an instructor of mathematics at West Point from August 21, 1899, to January 6, 1903. He served for two years as adjutant of the Field Artillery School at Fort Riley, Kansas. On September 1, 1905, he was sent to the School of Submarine Defense at Fort Totten, New York. After graduating in 1906, he remained on the faculty until 1911.

After the Artillery Corps split into field and coast artillery, he stayed with the latter. On December 10, 1913, he was detailed to the Inspector General's Department, and from 1915 to 1918, he was with the Quartermasters Department. From April 29 to June 11, 1918, he commanded the 66th Coast Artillery Regiment. He was promoted to brigadier general after serving in the office of the Chief of Staff until October 1, 1918. He also commanded the 37th Coast Artillery Brigade (AEF) from October 21, 1918, to February 7, 1919. He commanded the South Atlantic Coast Artillery District from March 4 to June 15, 1919, and from May 15 to June 15, he also was the commanding general of the Southeastern Department.

McNeil reverted to his permanent rank of lieutenant colonel of Coast Artillery on June 15, 1919. From August 1919 to July 1920 he was a student at the United States Army War College. On June 25, 1920, he was promoted to colonel of Coast Artillery. In addition, he was executive assistant to the chief of Coast Artillery for a year and four months, and he spent six months on the War Department General Staff, after which he was ordered home to await retirement. He retired on December 1, 1922.

McNeil died in Berkeley, California, on September 13, 1947.
