= Oxford (village), New York =

Oxford, New York
- Village
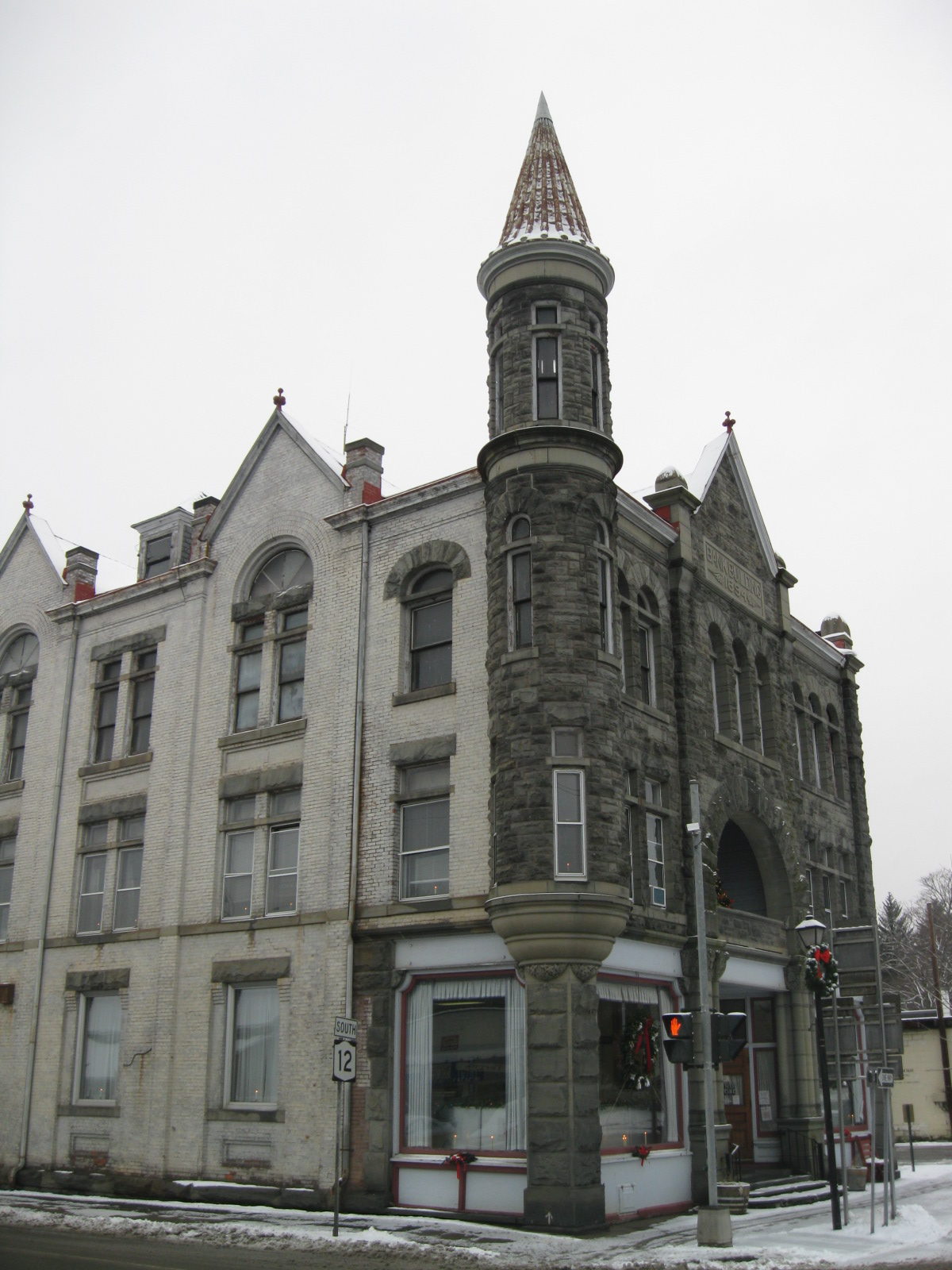
- First National Bank of Oxford building in 2009

- Location within the state of New York
- Coordinates: 42°26′32″N 75°35′52″W
- Country: United States
- State: New York
- County: Chenango
- Town: Oxford

Area
  - Total: 1.77 sq mi (4.59 km^{2})
  - Land: 1.77 sq mi (4.59 km^{2})
  - Water: 0 sq mi (0.00 km^{2})
- Elevation: 971 ft (296 m)

Population (2020)
  - Total: 1,330
  - Density: 750.8/sq mi (289.88/km^{2})
- Time zone: UTC-5 (Eastern (EST))
  - Summer (DST): UTC-4 (EDT)
- ZIP code: 13830
- Area code: 607
- FIPS code: 36-55948
- GNIS feature ID: 0959713
- Website: www.villageofoxfordny.gov

Oxford is a village in Chenango County, New York, United States. The population was 1,450 at the 2010 census. The village is named after Oxford, Massachusetts, the hometown of the landowner.

It is located in the south-central portion of Chenango County, known as the "southern tier," which is 8 miles southwest of the county seat, the City of Norwich. It is situated between the major metropolises of Binghamton to the south and Syracuse to the north and Oneonta to the east and Cortland to the west.

== History ==
The village was founded by its first settlers in 1791, including the landowner Benjamin Hovey (1758–1811) who was later a business partner of Aaron Burr and his cousin Theodore Burr.

The former Chenango Canal passed through the village, connecting the community to Utica and Binghamton.

In 1985, many of its historic buildings were included in the Oxford Village Historic District on the National Register of Historic Places.

== Geography ==
The village of Oxford is located in the northern part of the town of Oxford at 42°26′32″N 75°35′52″W (42.442354, -75.597822), in south-central Chenango County. The Chenango River, a south-flowing tributary of the Susquehanna River, divides the village.

According to the United States Census Bureau, the village has a total area of 1.8 square miles (4.6 km^{2}) all land.

New York State Route 12 (Canal Street) intersects New York State Route 220 (State Street to the west and Main Street to the east) in the village. NY-12 leads northeast 8 miles (13 km) to Norwich, the county seat, and southwest 13 miles (21 km) to Greene.

== Demographics ==
Historical population
| Census | Pop. | Note | %± |
|---|---|---|---|
| 1860 | 1,205 | | — |
| 1870 | 1,278 | | 6.1% |
| 1880 | 1,209 | | −5.4% |
| 1890 | 1,477 | | 22.2% |
| 1900 | 1,931 | | 30.7% |
| 1910 | 1,654 | | −14.3% |
| 1920 | 1,590 | | −3.9% |
| 1930 | 1,601 | | 0.7% |
| 1940 | 1,713 | | 7.0% |
| 1950 | 1,811 | | 5.7% |
| 1960 | 1,871 | | 3.3% |
| 1970 | 1,944 | | 3.9% |
| 1980 | 1,765 | | −9.2% |
| 1990 | 1,738 | | −1.5% |
| 2000 | 1,584 | | −8.9% |
| 2010 | 1,450 | | −8.5% |
| 2020 | 1,330 | | −8.3% |
U.S. Decennial Census

In 2021, Oxford, NY had a population of 1.39k people with a median age of 37 and a median household income of $43,864. Between 2020 and 2021 the population of Oxford, NY declined from 1,422 to 1,392, a −2.11% decrease and its median household income grew from $39,886 to $43,864, a 9.97% increase.

The 5 largest ethnic groups in Oxford, NY are White (Non-Hispanic) (95.6%), Two+ (Hispanic) (2.73%), Black or African American (Non-Hispanic) (0.718%), American Indian & Alaska Native (Hispanic) (0.575%), and Two+ (Non-Hispanic) (0.359%).

None of the households in Oxford, NY reported speaking a non-English language at home as their primary shared language. This does not consider the potential multi-lingual nature of households, but only the primary self-reported language spoken by all members of the household.

100% of the residents in Oxford, NY are U.S. citizens.

In 2021, the median property value in Oxford, NY was $92,500, and the homeownership rate was 65.8%.

Most people in Oxford, NY drove alone to work, and the average commute time was 19.7 minutes. The average car ownership in Oxford, NY was 2 cars per household.
