= Binghamton metropolitan area =

Greater Binghamton
- Metropolitan Statistical Area
- Binghamton, NY Metropolitan Statistical Area
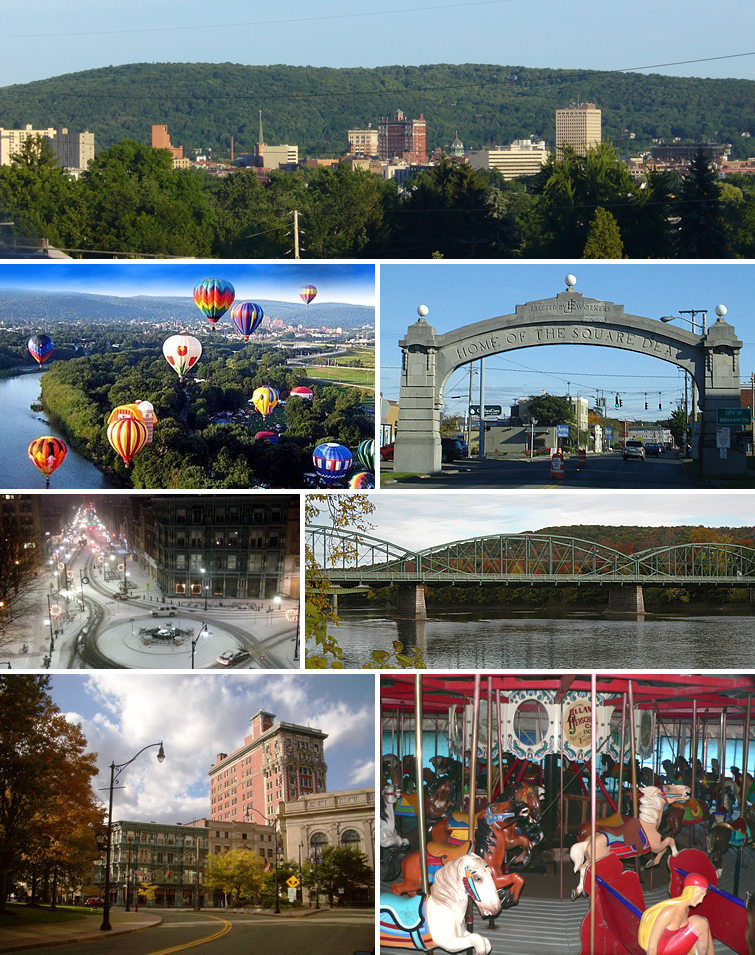
- Clockwise from top: Downtown Binghamton skyline, the Endicott Johnson Square Deal Arch, the South Washington Street Bridge, the Ross Park Zoo carousel, Court Street Historic District, downtown in winter, and the Spiedie Fest and Balloon Rally

- Greater Binghamton Logo
Map of Binghamton, NY MSA
City of Binghamton
Binghamton, NY MSA
- Coordinates: 42°14′07″N 75°59′34″W
- Country: United States
- State: New York
- Largest city: Binghamton

Population (2020)
  - Total: ▼247,138
  - Rank: 193rd in the U.S.
- Time zone: UTC−5 (EST)
  - Summer (DST): UTC−4 (EDT)

The Binghamton Metropolitan Statistical Area, also called Greater Binghamton or the Triple Cities, is a region of southern Upstate New York in the Northeastern United States, anchored by the city of Binghamton. The MSA encompasses Broome and Tioga counties, which together had a population of 247,138 as of the 2020 census. From 1963 to 1983, the MSA also included neighboring Susquehanna County in Pennsylvania, part of which still falls in the Binghamton, NY–PA Urban Area. In addition to these three counties, the greater Binghamton region includes parts of Chenango and Delaware counties in New York. Portions of Cortland and Otsego counties in New York and Wayne County, Pennsylvania, are sometimes considered part of the region as well. Using the definition of a 30-mile radius from Binghamton, the population as of the 2010 census is 317,331.

The Greater Binghamton name was adopted in the early 21st century to better identify the region with its most well-known city in efforts of marketing and external promotion.

The metropolitan area is located in the Southern Tier of New York State and lies on Pennsylvania's northern border, approximately 66 miles (110 km) south of Syracuse, New York.

== Triple Cities ==
Historically, the region has been known as the Triple Cities and is made up of Binghamton, Johnson City, and Endicott, the latter two of which are technically villages.

The area is also sometimes called the "Greater Binghamton Area" as the city of Binghamton is the largest and most prominent of the three, with a population greater than the other two combined, and a much larger geographical area. The three incorporated areas are close enough to appear as a single large, spread out, city. They are economically integrated, though they retain their political identities.

The idea of merging the three into a single city has been broached, but is politically unlikely. While "triple cities" strictly covers only the three main municipalities, the term also refers broadly to the surrounding area of conurbation, including Endwell, West Corners, the Upper Front Street area (technically in the town of Dickinson), and the town of Vestal. Vestal is home to the Vestal Parkway, a major commercial strip for the entire area, housing one of the two major multiplex theaters in the area, and a number of shopping plazas, major chain stores, and eateries. Binghamton University is also physically located in Vestal, though its mailing address is in Binghamton.

== Transportation ==
The core municipalities of Binghamton, Johnson City, and Endicott are connected together by the Southern Tier Expressway (NY 17, Interstate 86). Along with NY 17, Interstate 81 and Interstate 88 provide high-speed expressways that connect the majority of communities in the metro area together. I-81 connects the metro area to Syracuse, Canada, and Pennsylvania, while NY 17 connects the area to New York City and Western New York, and I-88 provides connections to Albany and New England. U.S. Route 11 and New York State Route 12 serve as important non-expressway gateways to the area.

Main Street (NY 17C) is connected as a single road through much of the urban core, beginning in downtown Binghamton and running through Johnson City, Endwell, and Endicott.

Broome County Transit operates 14 fixed route bus lines in the metropolitan area. Greyhound Bus Lines and New York Trailways operate intercity coach bus service through Binghamton, with direct connection to major cities in the region such as Ithaca, Syracuse, Rochester, Albany, and New York City.

The Greater Binghamton Airport is located in the Town of Maine, just north of the Village of Johnson City. Currently Delta Air Lines services the airport.

== Communities ==
=== Cities ===
- Binghamton (Principal city)

=== Towns ===
- Barker
- Barton
- Berkshire
- Binghamton
- Dickinson
- Candor
- Chenango
- Colesville
- Conklin
- Fenton
- Kirkwood
- Lisle
- Maine
- Nanticoke
- Newark Valley
- Nichols
- Owego
- Richford
- Sanford
- Spencer
- Tioga
- Triangle
- Union
- Vestal
- Windsor

=== Villages ===
- Candor
- Deposit (partial)
- Endicott
- Johnson City
- Lisle
- Newark Valley
- Nichols
- Owego
- Port Dickinson
- Spencer
- Waverly
- Whitney Point
- Windsor

=== Census-designated places ===
- Apalachin
- Endwell
- Chenango Bridge

=== Hamlets ===
- Campville
- Chenango Forks
- Killawog
- Hillcrest
- Nineveh
- Westover
- Chenango Bridge

== Demographics ==
As of the census of 2010, there were 251,725 people, 102,517 households, and 62,796 families residing within the MSA. The racial makeup of the MSA was 89.8% White, 4.0% African American, 0.2% Native American, 3.0% Asian, 0.04% Pacific Islander, 0.8% from other races, and 2.2% from two or more races. Hispanic or Latino of any race were 3.0% of the population.

As of the 2000 Census, the median income for a household in the MSA was $37,807, and the median income for a family was $45,966. Males had a median income of $33,294 versus $24,098 for females. The per capita income for the MSA was $18,921.

As of the 2020 Census, the median income for a household in the MSA was $57,698.

In 2024, the median household income was $65,599.

Historical Population
Year	Pop.	±%
1990	264,497	—
2000	253,320	−4.2%
2010	251,725	−0.6%
2020	247,135	−1.8%

County	2025 Estimate	2020 Census	Change	Area	Density
Broome County	195,736	198,683	−1.48%	705.77 sq mi (1,827.9 km^{2})	277/sq mi (107/km^{2})
Tioga County	47,453	48,455	−2.07%	518.60 sq mi (1,343.2 km^{2})	92/sq mi (35/km^{2})
Total MSA Population	243,189	247,138	−1.60%	1,224.37 sq mi (3,171.1 km^{2})	199/sq mi (77/km^{2})

== Colleges and universities ==
- Broome County
  - Binghamton University in Vestal
  - SUNY Broome in Dickinson
  - Davis College in Johnson City (defunct)
  - Elmira Business Institute in Vestal (defunct)
  - In Binghamton:
    - Empire State College learning center
    - Ridley-Lowell Business and Technical Institute's Binghamton campus (defunct)
    - State University of New York Upstate Medical University clinical campus
- Tioga County
  - SUNY Broome in Waverly
  - SUNY Broome in Owego

== See also ==
- New York census statistical areas
