= Barker, Broome County, New York =

Barker, New York
- Town
- Logo

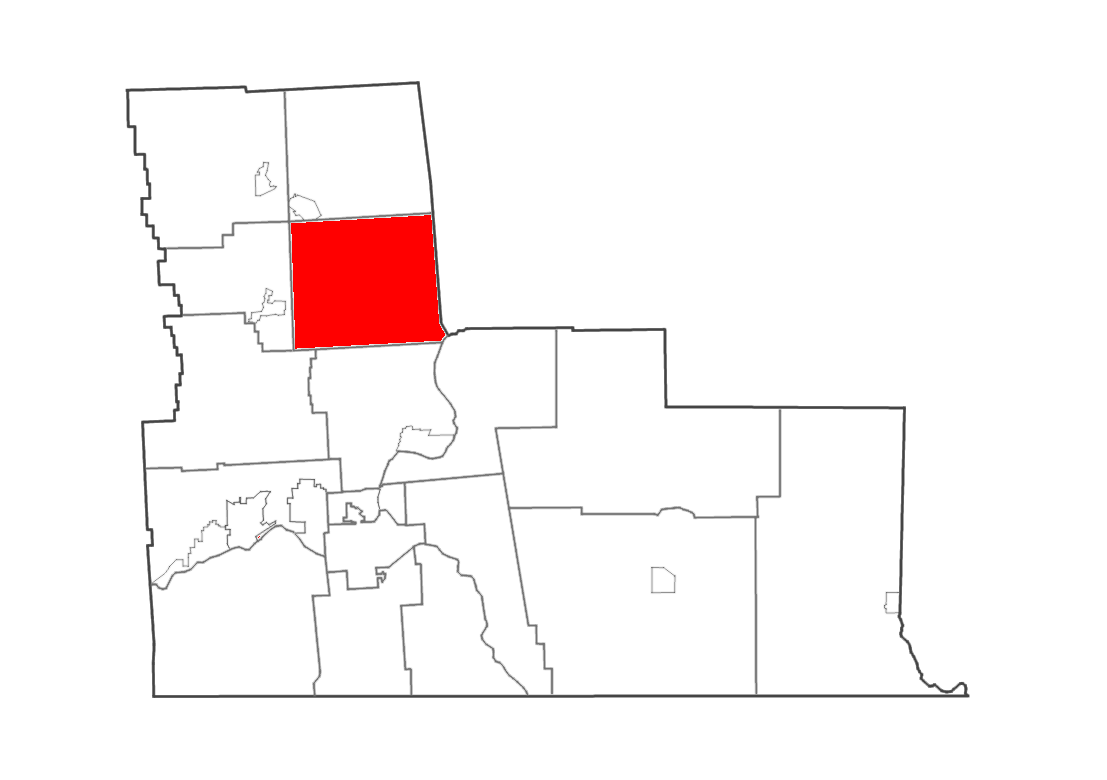
- Location within Broome County

- Location within New York Location within the United States
- Coordinates: 42°17′4″N 75°55′23″W
- Country: United States
- State: New York
- County: Broome
- Organized: 1831

Government
  - Type: Town council
  - Town supervisor: Lois Dilworth
  - Town council: Members' list: • Terry Dean; • Henry Dedrick; • Paul Smith; • Gordon Fuller

Area
  - Total: 41.78 sq mi (108.21 km^{2})
  - Land: 41.40 sq mi (107.23 km^{2})
  - Water: 0.37 sq mi (0.97 km^{2})
- Elevation: 1,335 ft (407 m)

Population (2020)
  - Total: 2,516 ▼
  - Estimate (2021): 2,496
  - Density: 64.4/sq mi (24.85/km^{2})
- Time zone: Eastern (EST)
- ZIP Codes: 13744 (Castle Creek); 13746 (Chenango Forks); 13777 (Glen Aubrey); 13862 (Whitney Point); 13905 (Binghamton)
- FIPS code: 36-04429
- GNIS feature ID: 978709
- Website: townofbarkerny.gov

Barker is a town in Broome County, New York, United States. The population was 2,516 at the 2020 census. The town is named after John Barker, an early settler. The town is in the northern part of Broome County and is north of Binghamton.

== History ==
The region was first settled circa 1782. The town of Barker was formed in 1831 from a portion of the town of Lisle.

== Geography ==
According to the United States Census Bureau, the town has a total area of 41.8 square miles (108.2 km^{2}), of which 41.4 square miles (107.2 km^{2}) is land and 0.39 square miles (1.0 km^{2}), or 0.90%, is water.

The town is bordered to the north by the town of Triangle, to the northwest by Lisle, the west by Nanticoke, the southwest by Maine, the south by Chenango, and the southeast by Fenton. The eastern town line is the border of Chenango County (town of Greene).

Interstate 81, U.S. Route 11, New York State Route 79, and the Tioughnioga River pass through Barker. It is 13 miles (21 km) south to Binghamton and 27 miles (43 km) north to Cortland.

== Demographics ==
Historical population
Census	Pop.	Note	%±
1840	1,259		—
1850	1,456		15.6%
1860	1,090		−25.1%
1870	1,396		28.1%
1880	1,333		−4.5%
1890	1,100		−17.5%
1900	1,072		−2.5%
1910	948		−11.6%
1920	1,003		5.8%
1930	992		−1.1%
1940	1,223		23.3%
1950	1,456		19.1%
1960	1,683		15.6%
1970	2,032		20.7%
1980	2,244		10.4%
1990	2,714		20.9%
2000	2,738		0.9%
2010	2,732		−0.2%
2020	2,516		−7.9%
2021 (est.)	2,496		−0.8%
U.S. Decennial Census

As of the census of 2000, there were 2,738 people, 993 households, and 754 families residing in the town. The population density was 66.2 inhabitants per square mile (25.6/km^{2}). There were 1,067 housing units at an average density of 25.8 per square mile (10.0/km^{2}). The racial makeup of the town was 97.77% White, 0.77% African American, 0.11% Native American, 0.33% Asian, 0.15% from other races, and 0.88% from two or more races. Hispanic or Latino of any race were 0.58% of the population.

There were 993 households, out of which 37.0% had children under the age of 18 living with them, 60.5% were married couples living together, 8.6% had a female householder with no husband present, and 24.0% were non-families. 18.5% of all households were made up of individuals, and 5.9% had someone living alone who was 65 years of age or older. The average household size was 2.76 and the average family size was 3.10.

In the town, the population was spread out, with 28.5% under the age of 18, 7.3% from 18 to 24, 30.2% from 25 to 44, 23.7% from 45 to 64, and 10.3% who were 65 years of age or older. The median age was 38 years. For every 100 females, there were 107.6 males. For every 100 females age 18 and over, there were 107.0 males.

The median income for a household in the town was $37,056, and the median income for a family was $39,267. Males had a median income of $30,691 versus $21,492 for females. The per capita income for the town was $16,192. About 7.6% of families and 10.9% of the population were below the poverty line, including 12.2% of those under age 18 and 10.5% of those age 65 or over.

== Communities and locations ==
- Chenango Forks – The northern part of this hamlet is at the southern town line.
- Hydeville – A hamlet on the western side of the town on County Road 101.
- Itaska – A hamlet in the northeastern part of the town on NY-79.

== Controversies ==
On July 11, 2011, Town Clerk Laura Fotusky stated she was refusing to sign any same-sex marriage licenses and would resign effective July 21, 2011.
