= Defense National Stockpile Center =

The Defense National Stockpile Center (DNSC) is a division of the United States Defense Logistics Agency (DLA) responsible for the acquisition, storage, management, and disposition of strategic and critical materials held in the National Defense Stockpile (NDS). Headquartered at Fort Belvoir, Virginia, the DNSC operates storage depots across the United States and manages a reserve of raw materials deemed vital for military, economic, and industrial readiness. The stockpile is designed to ensure the United States has access to essential resources during national emergencies or supply chain disruptions. The DNSC is based in Fort Belvoir and has operations throughout the United States. Materials they offer for sale include: aluminum oxide, beryllium, chromium, cobalt, diamonds, ferrochromium, ferromanganese, iodine, iridium, mica, niobium, platinum group metals, talc, tantalum, thorium, tin, tungsten and zinc.

== Facilities ==
The DNSC currently has facilities in, but not limited to:

- Baton Rouge Depot, Baton Rouge, Louisiana
- Binghamton Depot, Binghamton, New York
- Clearfield Depot, Clearfield, Utah
- Curtis Bay Depot, Curtis Bay, Maryland
- Gadsden Depot, Gadsden, Alabama
- Hammond Depot, Hammond, Indiana
- New Haven Depot, New Haven, Indiana
- Point Pleasant Depot, Point Pleasant, West Virginia
- Scotia Depot, Scotia, New York
- Sharonville Engineer Depot, Sharonville, Ohio
- Former Somerville Depot, Somerville, New Jersey 152 US Highway 206 South, Hillsborough, NJ 08844
- Stockton Depot, Stockton, California
- Voorheesville Depot, Voorheesville, New York
- Warren Depot, Warren, Ohio

The DNSC formerly had a facility north of Binghamton, New York, in Fenton, New York. A stone spillway at that location was listed on the National Register of Historic Places in 2004.
