= Chenango Canal Prism and Lock 107 =

- U.S. National Register of Historic Places
- U.S. Historic district
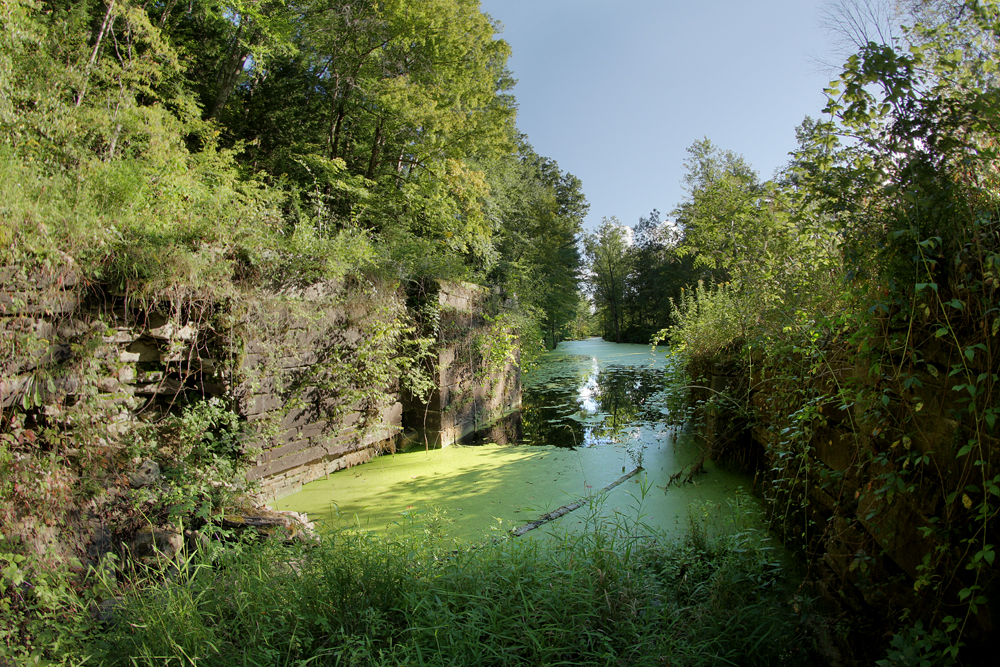

- Location within New York Location within the United States
- Location: River Road, Chenango Forks, New York
- Coordinates: 42°14′24″N 75°50′24″W
- Area: 2.44 acres (0.99 ha)
- MPS: Historic and Engineering Resources of the Chenango Canal MPS
- NRHP reference No.: 10000359
- Added to NRHP: June 18, 2010

Chenango Canal Prism and Lock 107 is a national historic district located at Chenango Forks in Broome County, New York, United States. The district includes four contributing structures. They are the guard lock and dam constructed between 1834 and 1836 for navigation as part of the Chenango Canal. The district also includes the canal prism and adjacent tow path at Lock 107.

It was added to the National Register of Historic Places in 2010.
