= 2020 Broome County Executive election =

Local election in Broome County, New York

- November 3, 2020
- Registered: 125,180
- Turnout: 88,201 (Note: Turnout is calculated as the number of ballots cast, excluding void and blank ballots, divided by the number of eligible voters.); 70.46%

Nominee	Jason Garnar	Karl Bernhardsen
Party	Democratic	Republican
Alliance		Conservative; Independence
Popular vote	57,766	30,360
Percentage	65.49%	34.42%
- Garnar: 50–60% 60–70% 70–80% 80–90% Bernhardsen: 50–60%
County Executive before election
Jason Garnar
Democratic
Elected County Executive
Jason Garnar
Democratic

The 2020 Broome County Executive election was held on November 3, 2020, to elect the County Executive of Broome County, New York. Incumbent Democratic County Executive Jason Garnar was re-elected to a second consecutive term.

== Democratic Nomination ==
=== Nominee ===
- Jason Garnar, incumbent Broome County Executive

== Republican Nomination ==
=== Nominee ===
- Karl Bernhardsen, former county legislator from the 13th district (2015–2016)

== General Election ==
=== Results ===
2020 Broome County Executive election
Party	Candidate	Votes	%	±%
Democratic	Jason T. Garnar	57,766	65.49%	+17.16%
Total	Karl Bernhardsen	30,360	34.42%	–10.64%
Republican	Karl Bernhardsen	26,989	30.60%	–8.41%
Conservative	Karl Bernhardsen	2,289	2.60%	–1.31%
Independence	Karl Bernhardsen	1,082	1.23%	–0.43%
Write-in		55	0.06%	–0.07%
Total votes		88,201	100.0	
Democratic hold				
