= Hillcrest, Broome County, New York =

Hillcrest, New York
- Hamlet
- Location within New York Location within the United States
- Coordinates: 42.153667°N 75.884261°W
- Country: United States
- State: New York
- County: Broome
- Town: Fenton
- Time zone: Eastern Standard Time (North America)

Hillcrest is a hamlet, residential community, and water district in Broome County, New York, in the town of Fenton, directly north of the village of Port Dickinson in the town of Dickinson, as well as the city of Binghamton which is further south than Port Dickinson. To the north of Hillcrest is the hamlet of Chenango Bridge in the town of Chenango, and the town of Chenango is on both the north and west. Northeast of Hillcrest, the town of Fenton continues and the hamlet of Port Crane is in the northeast part of Fenton. Southeast of Hillcrest is the town of Kirkwood. Due east from Hillcrest is the town of Colesville. Hillcrest is the southwestern part of the town of Fenton, on the east side of the Chenango River next to Interstate 88, across the river from Chenango Bridge, and it is contiguous with Port Dickinson which is contiguous with the North Side of Binghamton, with Chenango Street, the main street in Hillcrest and Port Dickinson, going from Hillcrest all the way down to the middle of downtown Binghamton.

Hillcrest contains numerous single-family homes, a high school, two public parks, three churches, a public library, a cemetery, numerous industries and businesses, as well as a central plaza area within walking distance of most homes that includes a gas station, family-run Italian restaurant, ice cream parlor, diner, and other businesses. It lies in Broome County, and borders I-88 and the Chenango River.

== Places of interest ==
Some places of interest for community members and visitors are:

- Chenango Valley High School - a local high school.
- Hillcrest youth baseball Field - site of a baseball and softball field.
- Fenton Free Library - Community run library.
- Chenango Valley Cemetery
- Berean Bible Church A Non-denominational church with modern worship emphasis, located on the East Service Road.
- St. Francis of Assisi - Catholic Church, former school, and gymnasium.
- Ogden Hillcrest UMC - United Methodist Church, and Thrift Shop
- Stone Spillway, National Defense Stockpile Center - listed on the National Register of Historic Places in 2004.
