= Ice House Sports Complex =

Ice rink in Chenango, New York

Coordinates: 42.16808°N 75.87096°W

Riverbend Ice Center
- Riverbend
- Interactive map of Riverbend Ice Center
- Former names: Chenango Ice Rink
- Location: Chenango, New York, U.S.
- Capacity: 1,200 (hockey)
- Surface: 200' x 85'(hockey)

Tenants
- Binghamton Bearcats (ACHA); Binghamton Jr. Senators (AJHL) (2005–2010); Broome County Barons (FHL) (2010)

The Riverbend Ice Center is a 1,200-seat ice rink located in Chenango, New York.

The Riverbend Ice Center, located in Chenango, New York, just outside Binghamton, has a long history in the Southern Tier region. Originally known as the Polar Cap Ice Rink, it was built to serve the growing demand for ice sports, including hockey and figure skating, in the early 1980s. Over the decades, the rink underwent several changes in ownership and management, eventually being rebranded as the Ice House Skating Rink in the 1990s. Despite these changes, the rink maintained its role as a cornerstone of the local ice sports community.

Early Years as Polar Cap Ice Rink

When it first opened as the Polar Cap Ice Rink, the facility quickly became a vital hub for local hockey teams, figure skating clubs, and families looking for recreational skating options. The rink was one of the few facilities in the region at the time, providing much-needed ice time for high school hockey teams, youth leagues, and figure skaters.

As Polar Cap Ice Rink, the venue hosted various tournaments and events, becoming a go-to location for regional competitions. It also offered public skating sessions, which became a popular activity, especially during the winter months when residents sought indoor recreation.

Transition to Ice House Skating Rink

In the 1990s, under new ownership, the rink was renamed the Ice House Skating Rink. The rebranding marked a new era for the facility, with updated programming and a renewed focus on community engagement. The rink continued to serve as the home for local hockey leagues, figure skating lessons, and public skating events. Its central location made it a popular venue for youth hockey and adult leagues, as well as for high school teams in the Southern Tier.

Throughout its time as Ice House Skating Rink, the facility had a strong connection to local sports programs. In addition to ice hockey and figure skating, the rink also offered birthday parties, special events, and skate rentals.

Transition to Riverbend Ice Center

In 2024, new owners acquired the facility with plans to renovate and revitalize it. The rink was rebranded as Riverbend Ice Center in an effort to restore the rink’s place as a cornerstone of local ice sports.

The new ownership committed to upgrading the facility and expanding its offerings, aiming to breathe new life into the venue and continue serving the Southern Tier region. With these changes, Riverbend Ice Center is poised to build on the Ice House's legacy while modernizing the facility for future generations of skaters and hockey players.

Legacy

The Ice House Skating Rink remains an important part of Chenango’s and Binghamton’s sports history. For over three decades, it provided a place for athletes to train, compete, and enjoy recreational skating. The rink's role in promoting ice hockey and figure skating in the Southern Tier cannot be overstated, as it helped foster a love for these sports in the region.

With the transition to Riverbend Ice Center, the facility continues to uphold the mission of offering top-quality ice skating opportunities to the local community. Though its name has changed, the legacy of the Ice House Skating Rink lives on through the skaters and hockey players who once called it home.

The rink served as the home of the Binghamton Jr. Senators playing in the Tier III Junior A Atlantic Junior Hockey League until 2010, when the team moved to Wilkes-Barre/Scranton, Pennsylvania, to become the Wilkes-Barre/Scranton Knights.
