= Stone Spillway, National Defense Stockpile Center =

- U.S. National Register of Historic Places
- Location within New York Location within the United States
- Location: N of Gilmore Ave., Hillcrest, New York
- Coordinates: 42°9′18″N 75°52′34″W
- Area: less than one acre
- Built: 1944
- NRHP reference No.: 04000347
- Added to NRHP: April 20, 2004

Stone Spillway, National Defense Stockpile Center is a historic spillway located on the grounds of the National Defense Stockpile Center at Hillcrest in Broome County, New York. It was built in 1944 of hand dressed fieldstone and concrete mortar, that was designed to direct runoff water from an intermittent stream through a gap in the riprap area and into the main ditch. The U-shaped structure consists of a 22-foot-long (6.7 m) center section flanked by smaller sections set at 45-degree angles. It was built as part of an erosion control project and believed to have been constructed by conscientious objectors under the Civilian Public Service Program.

It was listed on the National Register of Historic Places in 2004.
