= Broome County Executive =

County Executive of Broome County
- Incumbent; Jason Garnar since January 1, 2017
- Seat: Broome County Office Building
- Term length: Four years; renewable
- Constituting instrument: Broome County Charter
- Inaugural holder: Edwin L. Crawford
- Formation: 1968
- Salary: $150,000 (2026)
- Website: broomecountyny.gov/countyexec/exec

The Broome County Executive is the head of the executive branch of county government in Broome County, New York. The office was established in 1968 when Broome County adopted a county charter.

== List of county executives ==
No.	Name (birth–death)	Term	Party	Election
1	Edwin L. Crawford (1925–1993)	c. December 1968 – December 31, 1976	Republican	1969 1972
2	Donald L. McManus (1933–2012)	January 1, 1977 – December 31, 1980	Democratic	1976
3	Carl S. Young	January 1, 1981 – December 31, 1988	Republican	1980 1984
4	Timothy M. Grippen (1947–2021)	January 1, 1989 – December 31, 1996	Democratic	1988 1992
5	Jeffrey P. Kraham (1949–2016)	January 1, 1997 – December 31, 2004	Republican	1996 2000
6	Barbara J. Fiala (b. 1944)	January 1, 2005 – April 15, 2011	Democratic	2004 2008
7	Patrick J. Brennan	April 16, 2011 – December 31, 2011	Democratic	– (Note: Appointed after the resignation of Barbara Fiala)
8	Debra A. Preston	January 1, 2012 – December 31, 2016	Republican	2011 (special) 2012
9	Jason T. Garnar (b. 1976)	January 1, 2017 – present	Democratic	2016 2020 2024
