= 2024 Broome County Executive election =

- November 5, 2024
- Registered: 128,988
- Turnout: 61,178 (Note: Turnout is calculated as the number of ballots cast, excluding void and blank ballots, divided by the number of eligible voters.); 47.43% (▼23.03 pp)
Nominee	Jason Garnar
Party	Democratic
Popular vote	60,240
Percentage	98.47%
- Precinct results Garnar: >90% No data
County Executive before election
Jason Garnar
Democratic
Elected County Executive
Jason Garnar
Democratic

The 2024 Broome County Executive election was held on November 5, 2024, to elect the County Executive of Broome County, New York. Incumbent Democratic County Executive Jason Garnar ran unopposed and was re-elected to a third consecutive term. Garnar's victory made him the first Broome County Executive to be elected to a third term.

== Democratic Nomination ==
=== Nominee ===
- Jason Garnar, incumbent Broome County Executive

== General Election ==
=== Results ===
2024 Broome County Executive election
Party	Candidate	Votes	%
Democratic	Jason Garnar	60,240	98.47%
Write-in		938	1.53%
Total votes		61,178	100.0
Democratic hold			
