= Chenango Valley State Park =

State park in Broome County, New York

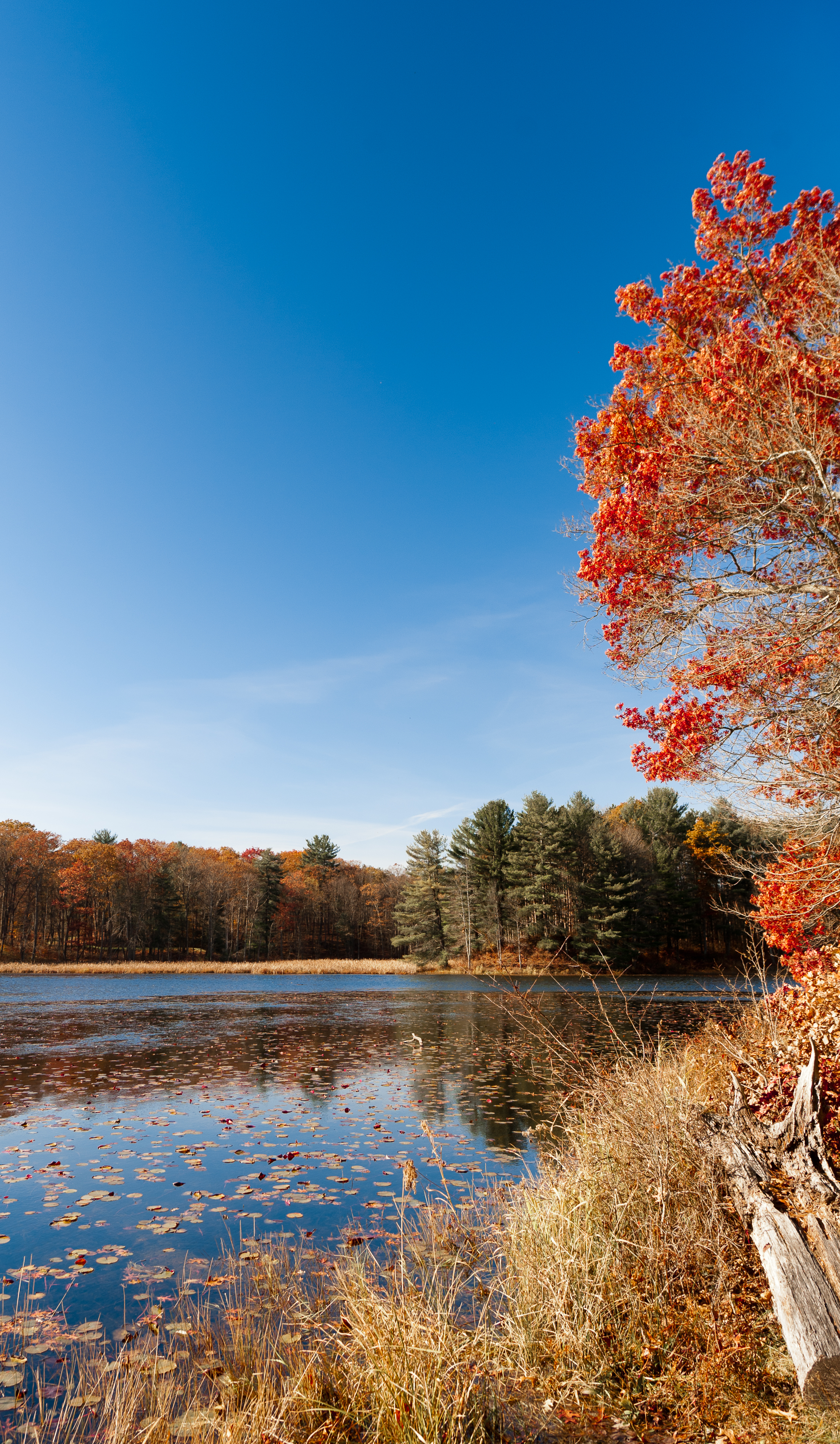
- Chenango Valley State Park, November 2011

- Location within New York
- Interactive map of Chenango Valley State Park
- Type: State park
- Location: 153 State Park Road; Chenango Forks, New York
- Nearest city: Binghamton, New York
- Coordinates: 42°12′54″N 75°49′48″W
- Area: 1,137 acres (4.60 km^{2})
- Operator: New York State Office of Parks, Recreation and Historic Preservation
- Visitors: 173,960 (in 2014)
- Open: All year
- Camp sites: 184
- Website: Chenango Valley State Park

Chenango Valley State Park is a 1,137-acre (4.60 km^{2}) state park located in Broome County, New York in the United States. The park is located adjacent to the Chenango River in western part of the Town of Fenton.

The park includes the 18-hole Chenango Valley State Park Golf Course.

== Park description ==
Chenango Valley State Park offers a beach, picnic tables with pavilions, a playground, recreation programs, a 184-site campground, 24 cabins, sledding, a boat launch with boat rentals, and a food concession. Trails are available for hiking, biking, and cross-country skiing.

The park includes forested and wetland habitats; forested areas contain populations of woodpeckers, nuthatches, warblers and thrushes, while the lake and wetland areas host herons, ducks and kingfishers. For anglers, Chenango Lake includes trout, bass, perch and bullhead.

Two kettle lakes, Chenango Lake and Lily Lake, are found within the park. The lakes were formed as glaciers receded at the end of the most recent ice age.

The Chenango Valley State Park Golf Course is located within the park. The course, originally constructed as a 9-hole course by the Civilian Conservation Corps in the 1930s, was expanded to its current 18-hole size in 1967.

== See also ==
- List of New York state parks
