= Gadsden Depot =

Coordinates: 33.97156°N 85.93762°W

Gadsden Depot was a United States military depot for storage of industrial materials in the city of Gadsden, Alabama. During World War II, it was referred to as Army Air Force Specialized Depot #829. The facility was known as Gadsden Air Force Station until deactivation in 1961. Upon closure of the facility, 1,671 jobs were lost, leaving 15% of Gadsden's workforce unemployed.

One side is also adjacent to the city of Glencoe. The facility is now an industrial park used by various firms.
