= Glen Aubrey, New York =

- Census-designated place
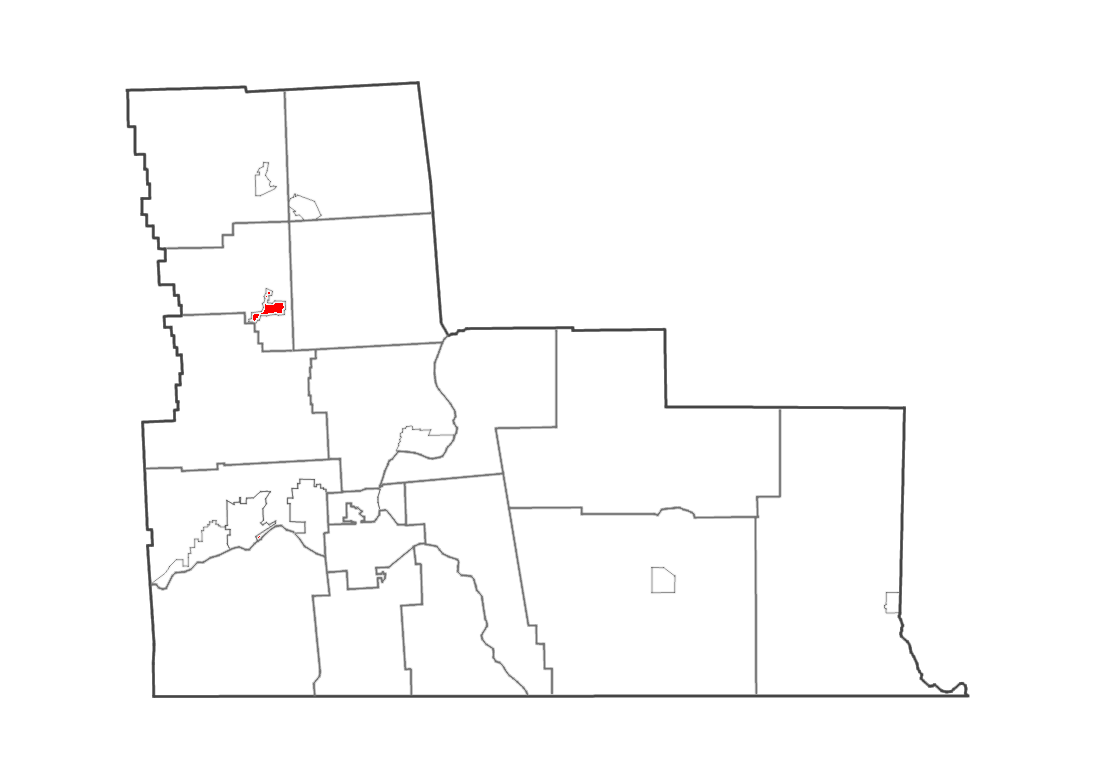
- Location in Broome County

- Location within New York Location within the United States
- Coordinates: 42°15′29″N 76°0′35″W
- Country: United States
- State: New York
- County: Broome
- Town: Nanticoke

Area
  - Total: 0.99 sq mi (2.56 km^{2})
  - Land: 0.99 sq mi (2.56 km^{2})
  - Water: 0 sq mi (0.00 km^{2})
- Elevation: 990 ft (300 m)

Population (2020)
  - Total: 446
  - Density: 452.1/sq mi (174.55/km^{2})
- Time zone: UTC-5 (Eastern (EST))
  - Summer (DST): UTC-4 (EDT)
- ZIP codes: 13777 (Glen Aubrey); 13862 (Whitney Point)
- Area code: 607
- FIPS code: 36-29058
- GNIS feature ID: 0951166

Glen Aubrey is a hamlet (and census-designated place) located in the town of Nanticoke in Broome County, New York, United States. Its population was 446 at the 2020 census.

== Geography ==
Glen Aubrey is located in the southeastern part of the town of Nanticoke. New York State Route 26 passes through the community, leading south 12 miles (19 km) to Endicott (west of Binghamton) and north 6 miles (10 km) to Interstate 81 at Whitney Point.

According to the United States Census Bureau, the CDP has a total area of 1.0 square mile (2.6 km^{2}), all land.

Glen Aubrey is in the valley of the East Branch of Nanticoke Creek, which flows south to the Susquehanna River.

== Demographics ==
Historical population
Census	Pop.	Note	%±
2010	485		—
2020	446		−8.0%
U.S. Decennial Census
