= Chenango Forks, New York =

- Hamlet
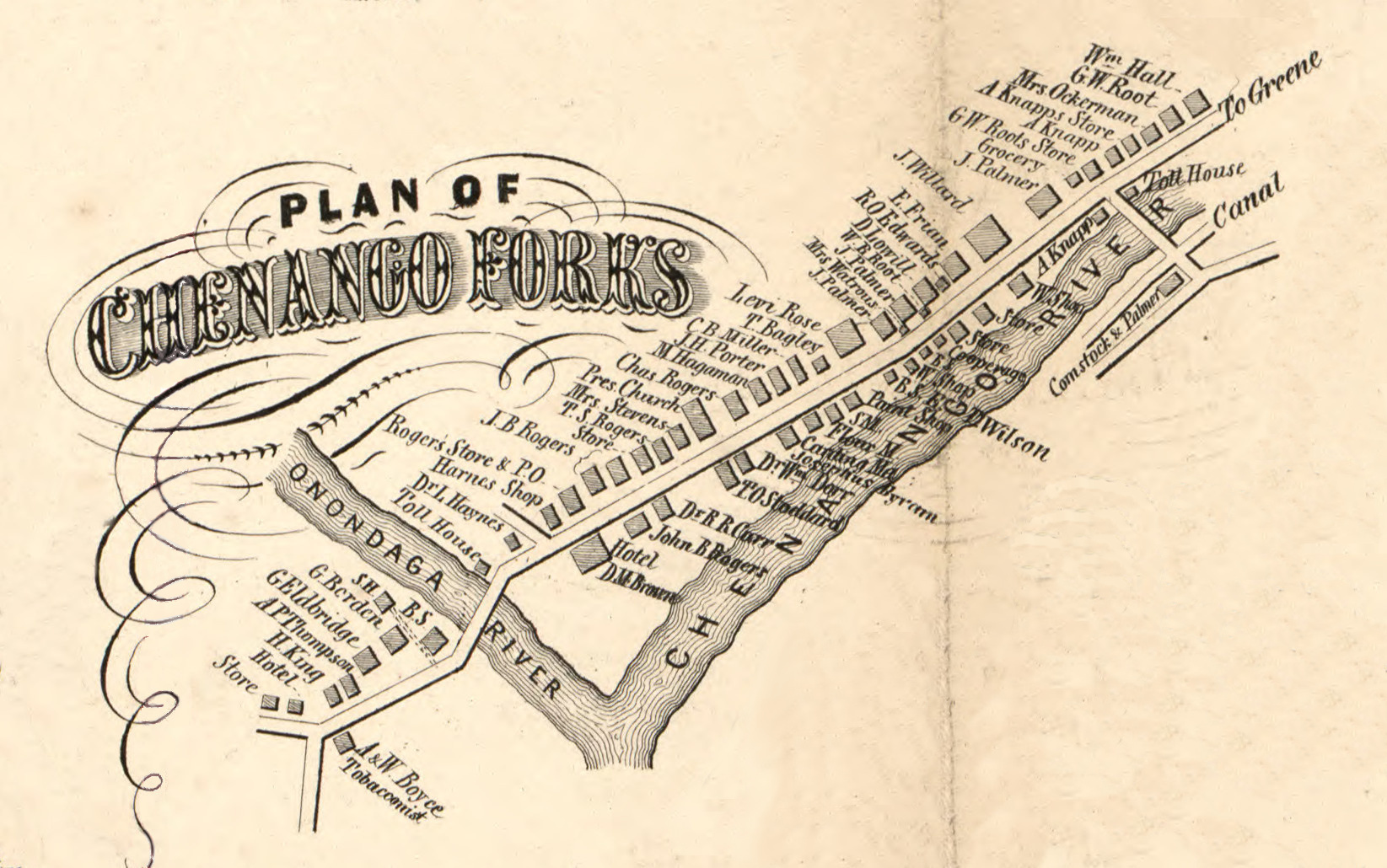
- Plan of Chenango Forks (1855)

- Location within New York
- Coordinates: 42°14′08″N 75°50′54″W
- Country: United States
- State: New York
- County: Broome
- Towns: Chenango, Barker
- Elevation: 915 ft (279 m)
- Time zone: UTC-5 (Eastern (EST))
  - Summer (DST): UTC-4 (EDT)
- ZIP code: 13746
- Area code: 607
- GNIS feature ID: 946482

Chenango Forks is a hamlet located in Broome County, New York, United States. The community is situated partly in the town of Chenango and partly in the town of Barker.

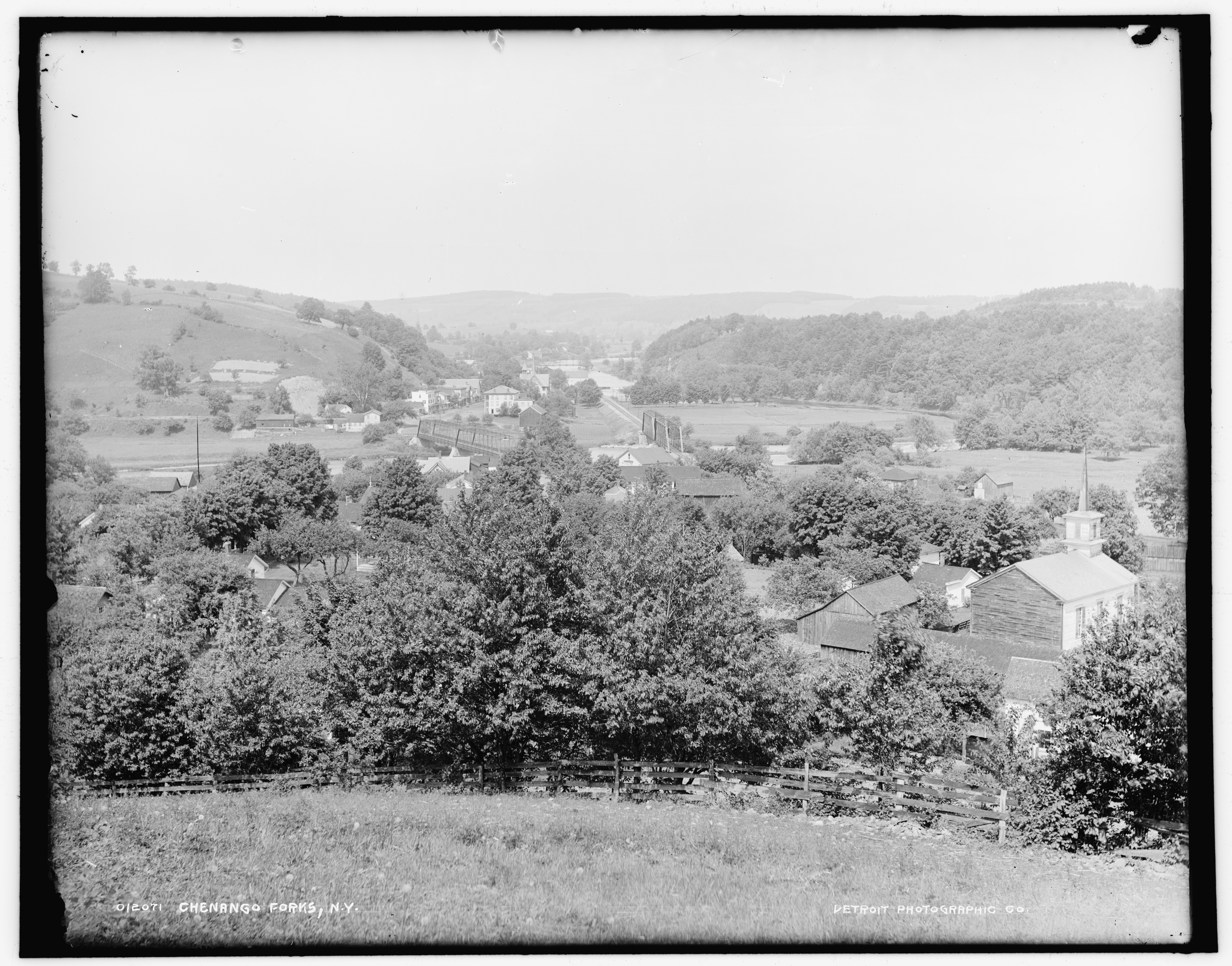
Chenango Forks in the early 1900s

Chenango Forks is approximately 9 miles (14 km) north of Binghamton on Route 12 and is at the confluence of the Chenango and Tioughnioga rivers. Chenango Valley State Park is southwest of the hamlet. Chenango Forks is a few miles from the border of Chenango County.

Chenango Forks is part of the Greater Binghamton Metropolitan Statistical Area.

The Chenango Canal Prism and Lock 107 was listed on the National Register of Historic Places in 2010.
