= Edwin L. Crawford =

American politician (1925–1993)

Edwin L. Crawford (April 10, 1925 – September 27, 1993) was an American politician, most notable for having served as Broome County, New York's first county executive, and was "a leader in efforts to modernize county governments through the United States."

== Biography ==
Crawford was born in Broome County and served in the 17th Airborne Division in Europe during World War II. After the war, he graduated from Cornell University and Cornell Law School and practiced law from 1950 to 1977.

He was appointed the first county executive of Broome County in 1968 and left office in 1976. After retiring from politics, he served as executive director of the New York State Association of Counties.

Crawford died of prostate cancer in 1993. The Edwin L. Crawford County Office Building in downtown Binghamton is named after him as is a memorial lecture at Albany Law School.

Political offices
New office	Broome County, New York Executive; 1968 – 1975	Succeeded by Donald L. McManus
Non-profit organization positions
Preceded by	Executive Director of the New York State Association of Counties; 1977 – 1993	Succeeded by John R. Zagame
