= Sharonville Engineer Depot =

Facility in Hamilton County, Ohio

Coordinates: 39°17′35″N 84°25′5″W

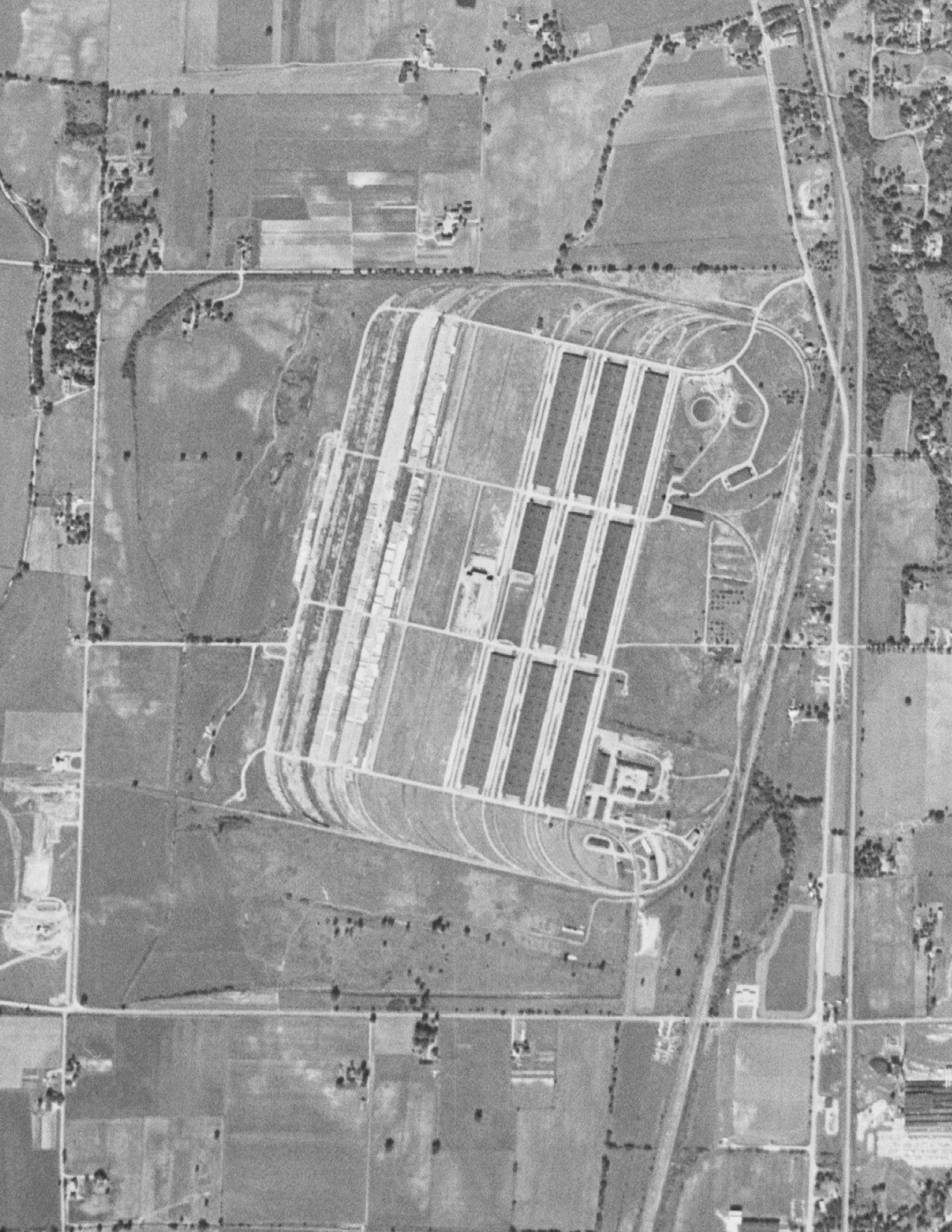
Sharonville Engineer Depot in 1951

The Sharonville Engineer Depot (sometimes Sharonville Engineering Depot) was a facility constructed by the United States Army near Sharonville in Hamilton County, Ohio, United States, for the purpose of storage of strategic metals. The site was originally 642 acres in size.

The site was constructed in 1942. The site was transferred to the General Services Administration (GSA) in 1949. After that time, the GSA sold or transferred portions of the property to various governmental and private entities. GSA retained approximately 80 acres which (in 1998) were leased to the Defense Logistics Agency (DLA).

The Depot is listed as a Formerly Used Defense Site by the United States Army Corps of Engineers (USACE).

The Depot was investigated by contractors working for the USACE in the mid-1990s. The investigation was triggered by reports of possible contamination in groundwater by organic compounds at the nearby Brighton Corporation. Four monitoring wells were installed and the groundwater was sampled, but no organic compounds were detected.
