= Castle Creek, New York =

- Hamlet
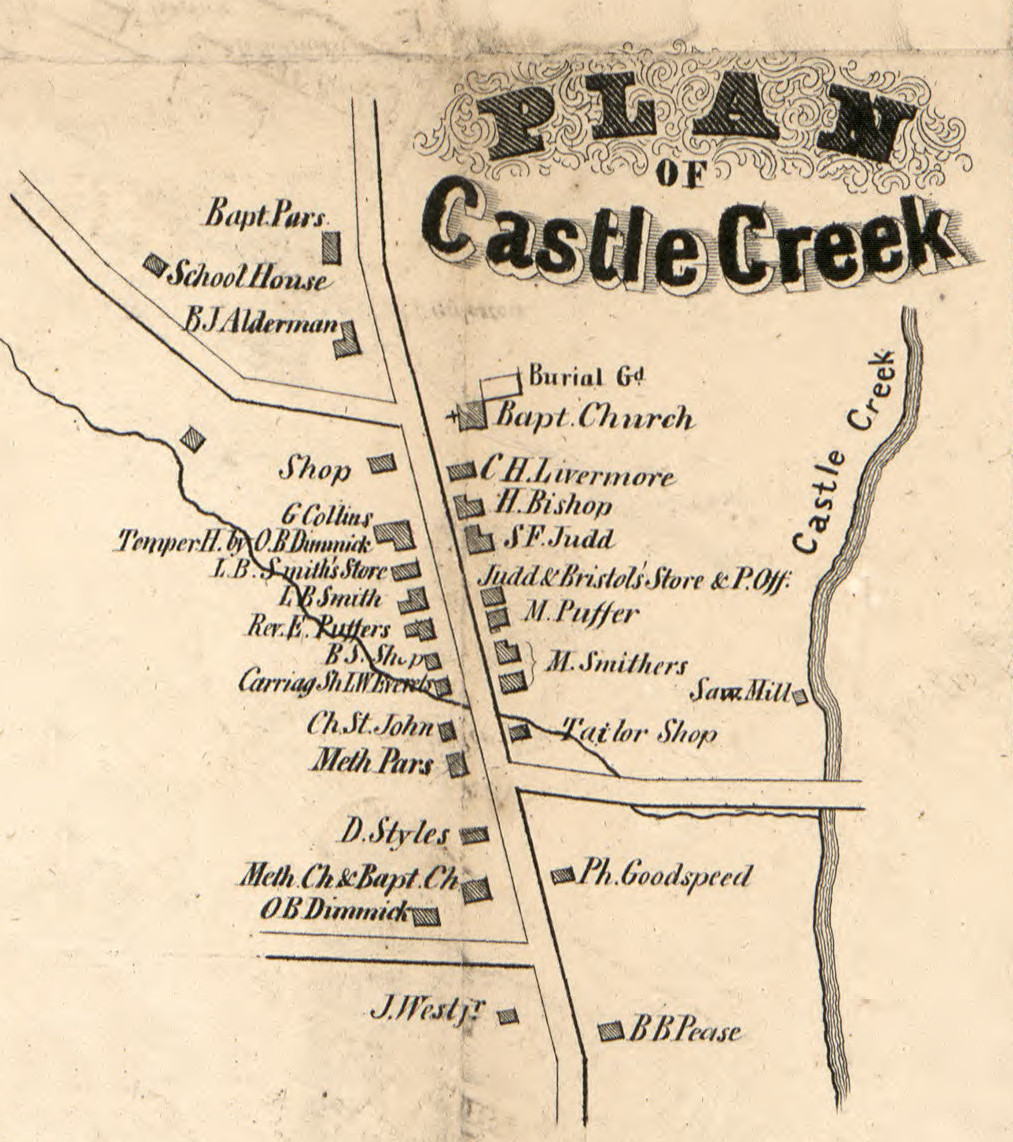
- Plan of Castle Creek (1855)

- Location within New York Location within the United States
- Coordinates: 42°13′39″N 75°55′06″W
- Country: United States
- State: New York
- County: Broome
- Elevation: 1,050 ft (320 m)
- Time zone: UTC-5 (Eastern (EST))
  - Summer (DST): UTC-4 (EDT)
- ZIP code: 13744
- Area code: 607
- GNIS feature ID: 945984

Castle Creek is a hamlet in Broome County, New York, United States. The community is located along U.S. Route 11, 8.9 miles (14.3 km) north of Binghamton. Castle Creek has a post office with ZIP code 13744, which opened on December 23, 1845.

== History ==
In the 1855 survey of Broome County by Gifford & Wenig, the post office is shown as "Judd & Bristol's Store & P. Off."
