= Nanticoke, New York =

- Town
- Seal
- Motto: "The Biggest Little Town in Broome County"
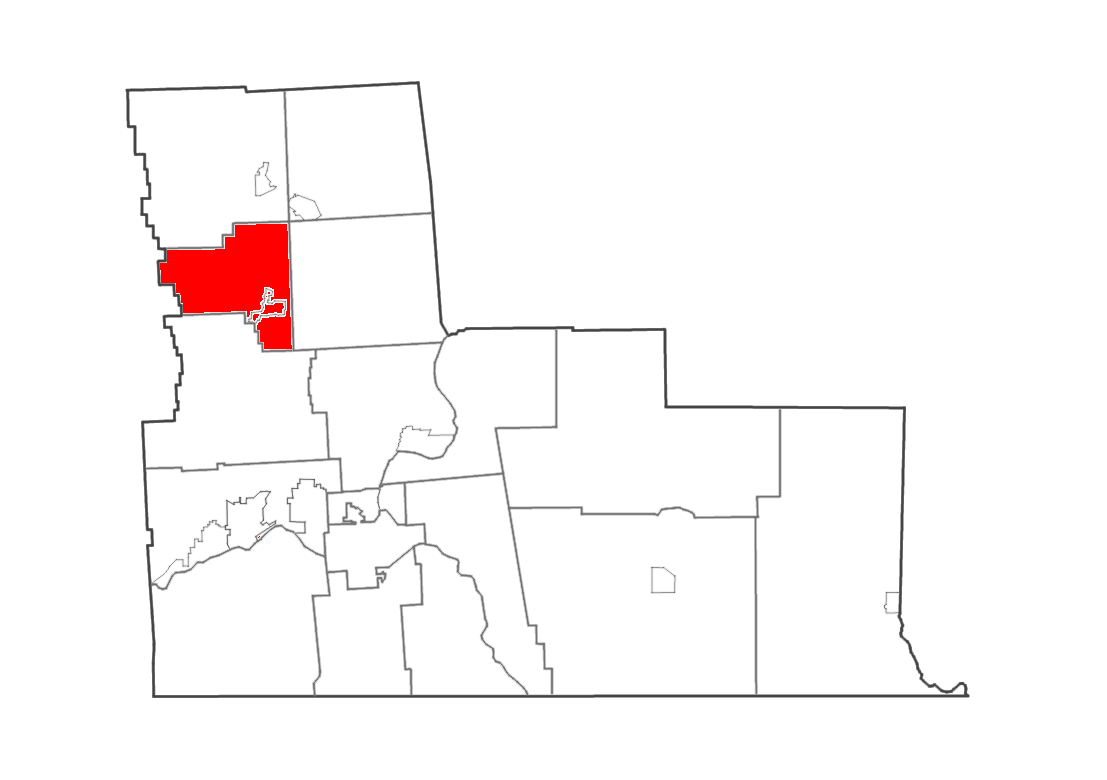
- Location in Broome County

- Location within New York Location within the United States
- Coordinates: 42°17′5″N 76°1′29″W
- Country: United States
- State: New York
- County: Broome
- Organized: 1831

Government
  - Type: Town Council
  - Town Supervisor: Donald Benjamin
  - Town Council: Members' List: • Charles Forkey, Jr.; • Scott Whittaker; • Daniel T. Baker; • vacant

Area
  - Total: 24.36 sq mi (63.09 km^{2})
  - Land: 24.27 sq mi (62.86 km^{2})
  - Water: 0.089 sq mi (0.23 km^{2})
- Elevation: 1,391 ft (424 m)

Population (2010)
  - Total: 1,672
  - Estimate (2016): 1,604
  - Density: 66.1/sq mi (25.52/km^{2})
- Time zone: UTC-5 (Eastern (EST))
  - Summer (DST): UTC-4 (EDT)
- ZIP Codes: 13777 (Glen Aubrey); 13797 (Lisle); 13802 (Maine); 13811 (Newark Valley); 13862 (Whitney Point)
- FIPS code: 36-49396
- GNIS feature ID: 979247
- Website: townofnanticokeny.com

Nanticoke is a town in Broome County, New York, United States. The population was 1,672 at the 2010 census. The town was named after the Nanticoke people, who were a Native American tribe native to the Chesapeake Bay.

The town is on the western border of the county and is northwest of Binghamton.

== History ==
The area was first settled by Europeans circa 1793. The town of Nanticoke was formed from the town of Lisle in 1831. The two villages, Glen Aubrey and Nanticoke, grew up around flour and lumber mills. Nanticoke people had been pushed from their home in the Chesapeake Bay first to Nanticoke, Pennsylvania, south of Nanticoke, New York. Later they were pushed again and resettled north once more, in Nanticoke, Ontario.

== Geography ==
According to the United States Census Bureau, the town has a total area of 24.4 square miles (63.1 km^{2}), of which 24.3 square miles (62.9 km^{2}) is land and 0.077 square miles (0.2 km^{2}), or 0.37%, is water.

The western town line is the border of Tioga County.

New York State Route 26 is a north-south highway in the town.

Nanticoke Creek flows southward from the town to the Susquehanna River.

== Demographics ==
Historical population
Census	Pop.	Note	%±
1840	400		—
1850	576		44.0%
1860	797		38.4%
1870	1,058		32.7%
1880	999		−5.6%
1890	723		−27.6%
1900	666		−7.9%
1910	536		−19.5%
1920	444		−17.2%
1930	454		2.3%
1940	546		20.3%
1950	627		14.8%
1960	794		26.6%
1970	1,020		28.5%
1980	1,425		39.7%
1990	1,846		29.5%
2000	1,790		−3.0%
2010	1,672		−6.6%
2016 (est.)	1,604		−4.1%
U.S. Decennial Census

As of the census of 2000, there were 1,790 people, 629 households, and 481 families residing in the town. The population density was 73.6 inhabitants per square mile (28.4/km^{2}). There were 717 housing units at an average density of 29.5 per square mile (11.4/km^{2}). The racial makeup of the town was 97.71% White, 0.28% African American, 0.39% Native American, 0.22% Asian, 0.22% from other races, and 1.17% from two or more races. Hispanic or Latino of any race were 0.84% of the population.

There were 629 households, out of which 39.9% had children under the age of 18 living with them, 62.5% were married couples living together, 7.9% had a female householder with no husband present, and 23.4% were non-families. 17.6% of all households were made up of individuals, and 7.0% had someone living alone who was 65 years of age or older. The average household size was 2.85 and the average family size was 3.20.

In the town, the population was spread out, with 30.4% under the age of 18, 7.8% from 18 to 24, 30.9% from 25 to 44, 21.9% from 45 to 64, and 8.9% who were 65 years of age or older. The median age was 35 years. For every 100 females, there were 99.1 males. For every 100 females age 18 and over, there were 97.9 males.

The median income for a household in the town was $36,761, and the median income for a family was $39,545. Males had a median income of $30,469 versus $21,739 for females. The per capita income for the town was $15,683. About 9.2% of families and 11.2% of the population were below the poverty line, including 13.8% of those under age 18 and 6.7% of those age 65 or over.

== Communities and locations in Nanticoke ==
- Glen Aubrey – A hamlet and census-designated place in the southern part of the town on NY-26. It was formerly known as the "Councilman Settlement".
- Greenwood Park – A county park near the western town line.
- Nanticoke – The hamlet of Nanticoke is in the western part of the town. It was previously called "Lambs Corners". The community is at the junction of County Roads 21 and 136.
- Nanticoke Springs – A former community lying southeast of Nanticoke village.
