= Chenango, New York =

- Town
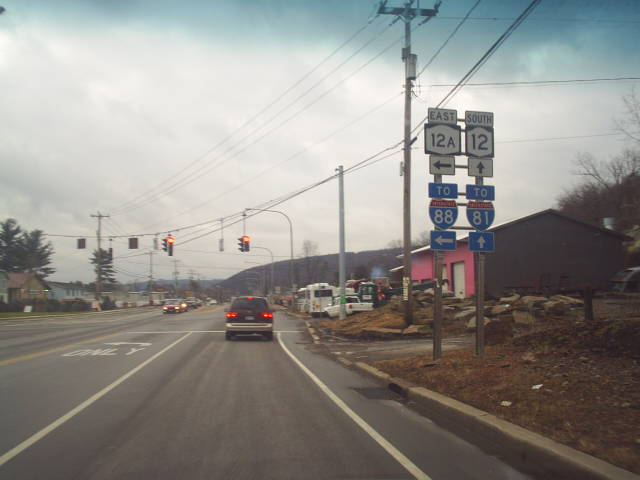
- State Route 12, Chenango Bridge, NY

- Seal

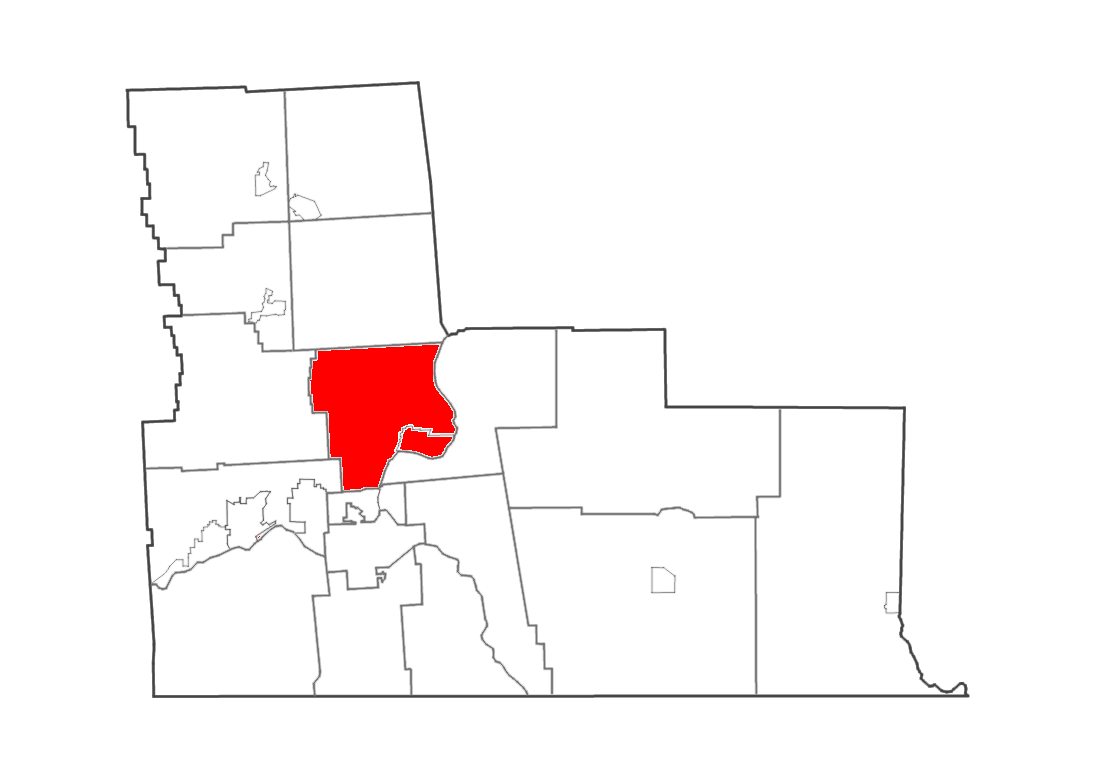
- Location within Broome County

- Location within New York Location within the United States
- Coordinates: 42°10′58″N 75°53′2″W
- Country: United States
- State: New York
- County: Broome

Government
  - Type: Town Council
  - Town Supervisor: Jo Anne Klenovic
  - Town Council: Members' List: • Terry Kellogg; • Frank Carl; • Jim DiMascio; • Gene Hulbert Jr.

Area
  - Total: 34.27 sq mi (88.75 km^{2})
  - Land: 33.83 sq mi (87.63 km^{2})
  - Water: 0.43 sq mi (1.12 km^{2})
- Elevation: 961 ft (293 m)

Population (2020)
  - Total: 10,983 ▼
  - Estimate (2021): 10,876
  - Density: 321.4/sq mi (124.11/km^{2})
- Time zone: UTC-5 (Eastern (EST))
  - Summer (DST): UTC-4 (EDT)
- ZIP Codes: 13744 (Castle Creek); 13745 (Chenango Bridge); 13746 (Chenango Forks); 13862 (Whitney Point); 13901, 13905 (Binghamton)
- FIPS code: 36-007-15110
- GNIS feature ID: 0978819
- Website: townofchenangony.gov

Chenango is a town in Broome County, New York, United States. The population was 10,983 at the 2020 census.

The town is northeast of Binghamton.

== History ==
The area was first settled around 1787, and the Town of Chenango was established in 1791 before the formation of Broome County. It is one of the original towns of the county, from which other towns were later formed.

== Geography ==
According to the United States Census Bureau, the town has a total area of 34.3 square miles (88.8 km^{2}), of which 33.8 square miles (87.6 km^{2}) is land and 0.42 square miles (1.1 km^{2}), or 1.27%, is water.

The Chenango River defines the eastern town line. Interstate 81, U.S. Route 11 and New York State Route 12 pass through it.

== Demographics ==
Historical population
| Census | Pop. | Note | %± |
|---|---|---|---|
| 1790 | 45 | | — |
| 1820 | 2,626 | | — |
| 1830 | 3,716 | | 41.5% |
| 1840 | 5,465 | | 47.1% |
| 1850 | 8,734 | | 59.8% |
| 1860 | 1,841 | | −78.9% |
| 1870 | 1,680 | | −8.7% |
| 1880 | 1,590 | | −5.4% |
| 1890 | 1,448 | | −8.9% |
| 1900 | 1,372 | | −5.2% |
| 1910 | 1,237 | | −9.8% |
| 1920 | 1,183 | | −4.4% |
| 1930 | 2,074 | | 75.3% |
| 1940 | 3,265 | | 57.4% |
| 1950 | 5,747 | | 76.0% |
| 1960 | 9,858 | | 71.5% |
| 1970 | 12,267 | | 24.4% |
| 1980 | 12,233 | | −0.3% |
| 1990 | 12,310 | | 0.6% |
| 2000 | 11,454 | | −7.0% |
| 2010 | 11,252 | | −1.8% |
| 2020 | 10,983 | | −2.4% |
| 2021 (est.) | 10,876 | | −1.0% |
U.S. Decennial Census

As of the census of 2000, there were 11,454 people, 4,519 households, and 3,271 families residing in the town. The population density was 337.7 inhabitants per square mile (130.4/km^{2}). There were 4,734 housing units at an average density of 139.6 per square mile (53.9/km^{2}). The racial makeup of the town was 97.44% White, 0.58% African American, 0.10% Native American, 0.53% Asian, 0.02% Pacific Islander, 0.38% from other races, and 0.94% from two or more races. Hispanic or Latino of any race were 0.93% of the population.

There were 4,519 households, out of which 32.4% had children under the age of 18 living with them, 59.2% were married couples living together, 9.5% had a female householder with no husband present, and 27.6% were non-families. 23.0% of all households were made up of individuals, and 10.2% had someone living alone who was 65 years of age or older. The average household size was 2.53 and the average family size was 2.98.

In the town, the population was spread out, with 25.2% under the age of 18, 6.5% from 18 to 24, 26.2% from 25 to 44, 27.2% from 45 to 64, and 14.9% who were 65 years of age or older. The median age was 40 years. For every 100 females, there were 97.9 males. For every 100 females age 18 and over, there were 93.7 males.

The median income for a household in the town was $47,342, and the median income for a family was $54,381. Males had a median income of $39,290 versus $27,645 for females. The per capita income for the town was $22,431. About 4.6% of families and 6.2% of the population were below the poverty line, including 5.5% of those under age 18 and 7.2% of those age 65 or over.

== Subdivisions ==
- Castle Creek – A hamlet in the northwestern part of the town, served by Exit 7 of Interstate 81.
- Chenango Bridge – A hamlet (and census-designated place) in the southern section of the town by the Chenango River, served by Exit 2 of Interstate 88 on the opposite side of the river.
- Chenango Forks – A hamlet in the northeastern part of the town, shared partly with the Town of Barker.
- Chenango Valley
- Glen Castle – A hamlet north of Hinmans Corners on US Route 11.
- Hinman's Corners – The intersection of NY-12 and US-11, served by Exit 6 of Interstate 81.
- Kattelville – A hamlet northeast of Newmans Corners on NY-12.
- Newmans Corners – A hamlet on NY-12 in the southern part of the town, north of Chenango Bridge.
- Nimmonsburg – A hamlet in the southern part of town bordering the town of Dickinson and located on Interstate 81 south of Hinman's Corners
- West Chenango – A hamlet by the western town line.
