= Chenango Bridge, New York =

Chenango Bridge
- Hamlet and census-designated place
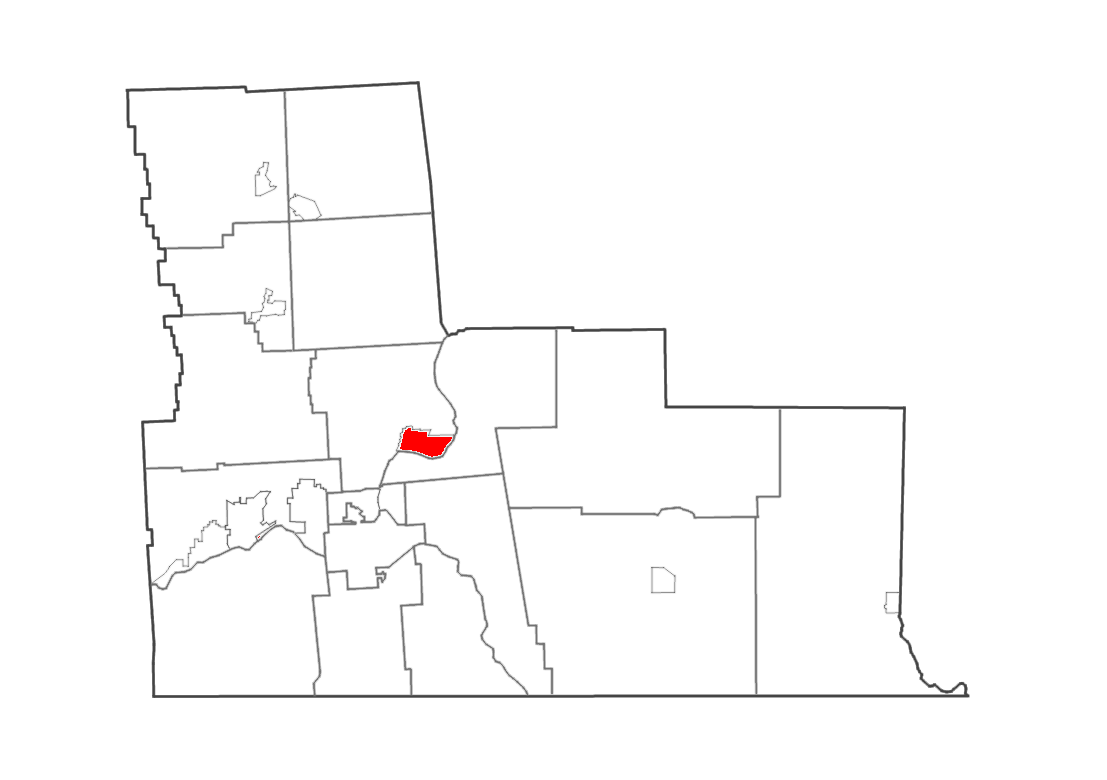
- Map highlighting Chenango Bridge's location within Broome County.

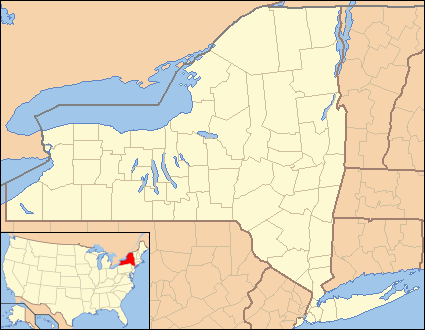
- Location within the state of New York
- Coordinates: 42°10′00″N 075°51′45″W
- Country: United States
- State: New York
- County: Broome County
- Town: Chenango
- Established: 1825

Area
  - Total: 2.59 sq mi (6.71 km^{2})
  - Land: 2.45 sq mi (6.34 km^{2})
  - Water: 0.14 sq mi (0.37 km^{2})
- Elevation: 896 ft (273 m)

Population (2020)
  - Total: 2,884
  - Density: 1,177.6/sq mi (454.68/km^{2})
- Time zone: UTC-5 (Eastern (EST))
  - Summer (DST): UTC-4 (EDT)
- ZIP code: 13745
- Area code: 607
- FIPS code: 36-15121
- GNIS feature ID: 946480

Chenango Bridge is a hamlet in the southern part of the Town of Chenango in Broome County, New York, United States. It lies where State Route 12A (Chenango Bridge Road) crosses the Chenango River. As of the 2020 census, Chenango Bridge had a population of 2,884. The community is listed as a census-designated place.

== Geography ==
Chenango Bridge is located at 42°10′00″N 075°51′45″W (42.1667426, -75.8624167) and its elevation is 896 feet (273 m).

According to the 2010 United States census, Chenango Bridge has a total area of 2.592 square miles (6.71 km^{2}), of which 2.448 square miles (6.34 km^{2}) is land and 0.144 square miles (0.37 km^{2}) is water.

Historical population
Census	Pop.	Note	%±
2020	2,884		—
U.S. Decennial Census

== Demographics ==
=== 2020 census ===
As of the 2020 census, Chenango Bridge had a population of 2,884. The median age was 46.7 years. 20.5% of residents were under the age of 18 and 23.7% of residents were 65 years of age or older. For every 100 females there were 97.8 males, and for every 100 females age 18 and over there were 95.4 males age 18 and over.

100.0% of residents lived in urban areas, while 0.0% lived in rural areas.

There were 1,170 households in Chenango Bridge, of which 25.8% had children under the age of 18 living in them. Of all households, 54.5% were married-couple households, 17.9% were households with a male householder and no spouse or partner present, and 23.0% were households with a female householder and no spouse or partner present. About 27.9% of all households were made up of individuals and 14.0% had someone living alone who was 65 years of age or older.

There were 1,256 housing units, of which 6.8% were vacant. The homeowner vacancy rate was 0.9% and the rental vacancy rate was 0.0%.

Racial composition as of the 2020 census
Race	Number	Percent
White	2,646	91.7%
Black or African American	24	0.8%
American Indian and Alaska Native	3	0.1%
Asian	32	1.1%
Native Hawaiian and Other Pacific Islander	0	0.0%
Some other race	22	0.8%
Two or more races	157	5.4%
Hispanic or Latino (of any race)	51	1.8%
