= Broome County, New York =

County in New York, United States

- County
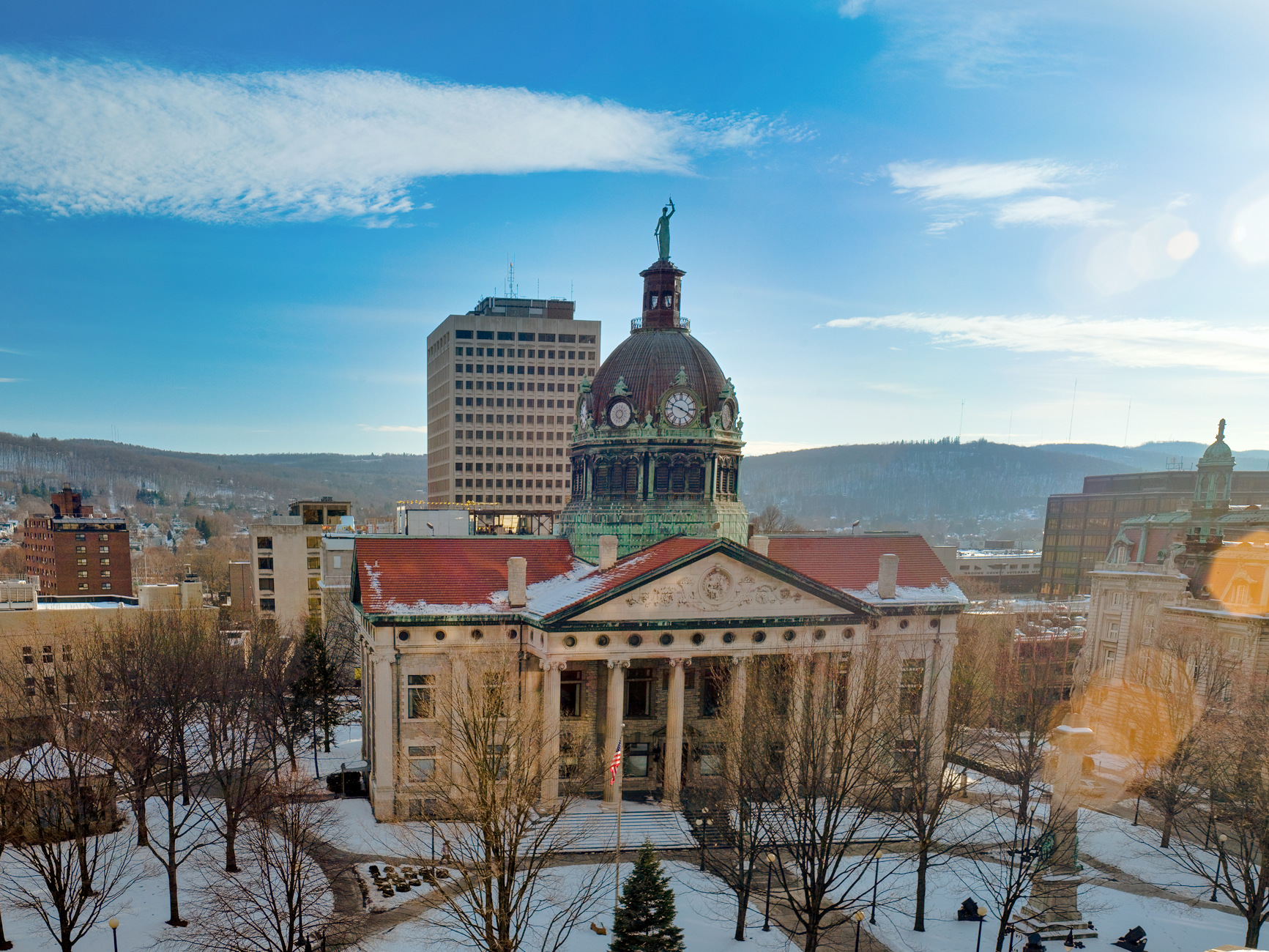
- Broome County Courthouse

- Flag Seal

- Location within the U.S. state of New York
- Coordinates: 42.16°N 75.82°W
- Country: United States
- State: New York
- Founded: 1806
- Named for: John Broome
- Seat: Binghamton
- Largest city: Binghamton

Government
  - County Executive: Jason T. Garnar

Area
  - Total: 715.52 sq mi (1,853.2 km^{2})
  - Land: 705.77 sq mi (1,827.9 km^{2})
  - Water: 9.7 sq mi (25 km^{2}) 1.4%

Population (2020)
  - Total: 198,683
  - Estimate (2025): 195,736 ▼
  - Density: 281.51/sq mi (108.69/km^{2})
- Time zone: UTC−5 (Eastern)
  - Summer (DST): UTC−4 (EDT)
- Congressional district: 19th
- Website: broomecountyny.gov

Broome County is a county in the U.S. state of New York. As of the 2020 United States census, the county had a population of 198,683. Its county seat is Binghamton. The county was named for John Broome, the state's lieutenant governor when Broome County was created. The county is part of the Southern Tier region of the state.

The county is part of the Binghamton, New York Metropolitan Statistical Area. It is home to Binghamton University, one of four university centers in the State University of New York (SUNY) system.

== History ==
When counties were established in the Province of New York in 1683, the present Broome County was part of the enormous Albany County, including the northern part of New York State as well as all of the present State of Vermont and, in theory, extending westward to the Pacific Ocean. This county was reduced in size on July 3, 1766, by the creation of Cumberland County, and further on March 16, 1770, by the creation of Gloucester County, both containing territory now in Vermont.

On March 12, 1772, what was left of Albany County was split into three parts, one remaining under the name Albany County. One of the other pieces, Tryon County, contained the western portion (and thus, since no western boundary was specified, theoretically still extended west to the Pacific). The eastern boundary of Tryon County was approximately five miles west of the present city of Schenectady, and the county included the western part of the Adirondack Mountains and the area west of the West Branch of the Delaware River. The area then designated as Tryon County now is organized as 37 counties of New York State. The county was named for William Tryon, colonial governor of New York.

In the years prior to 1776, most of the Loyalists in Tryon County fled to Canada. In 1784, following the peace treaty that ended the American Revolutionary War, the name of Tryon County was changed to Montgomery County, for General Richard Montgomery, who had captured several places in Canada and died attempting to capture the city of Quebec, thus replacing the name of the hated British governor.

In 1789, Montgomery County was reduced in size by the splitting off of Ontario County. The actual area split off from Montgomery County was much larger than the present county, also including the present Allegany, Cattaraugus, Chautauqua, Erie, Genesee, Livingston, Monroe, Niagara, Orleans, Steuben, Wyoming, Yates, and part of Schuyler and Wayne Counties.

In 1791, Tioga County split off from Montgomery County, along with Herkimer and Otsego Counties. Tioga County was at this time much larger than the present county and included the present Broome and Chemung Counties and parts of Chenango and Schuyler Counties.

In 1798, Tioga County was reduced in size by the splitting off of Chemung County (which also included part of the present Schuyler County) and by the combination of a portion with a portion of Herkimer County to create Chenango County.

On March 28, 1806, Broome County was formed by splitting several towns off from Tioga County. At the time, this included all of Broome County's current area, as well as the then-named town of Tioga (renamed the town of Owego in 1813) and the town of Berkshire. Small portions of land were lost to Cortland County and Tompkins County in 1815 and 1817, respectively. The towns of Owego and Berkshire were returned to Tioga County on March 21, 1822, establishing the present-day boundaries of Broome County.

== Geography ==
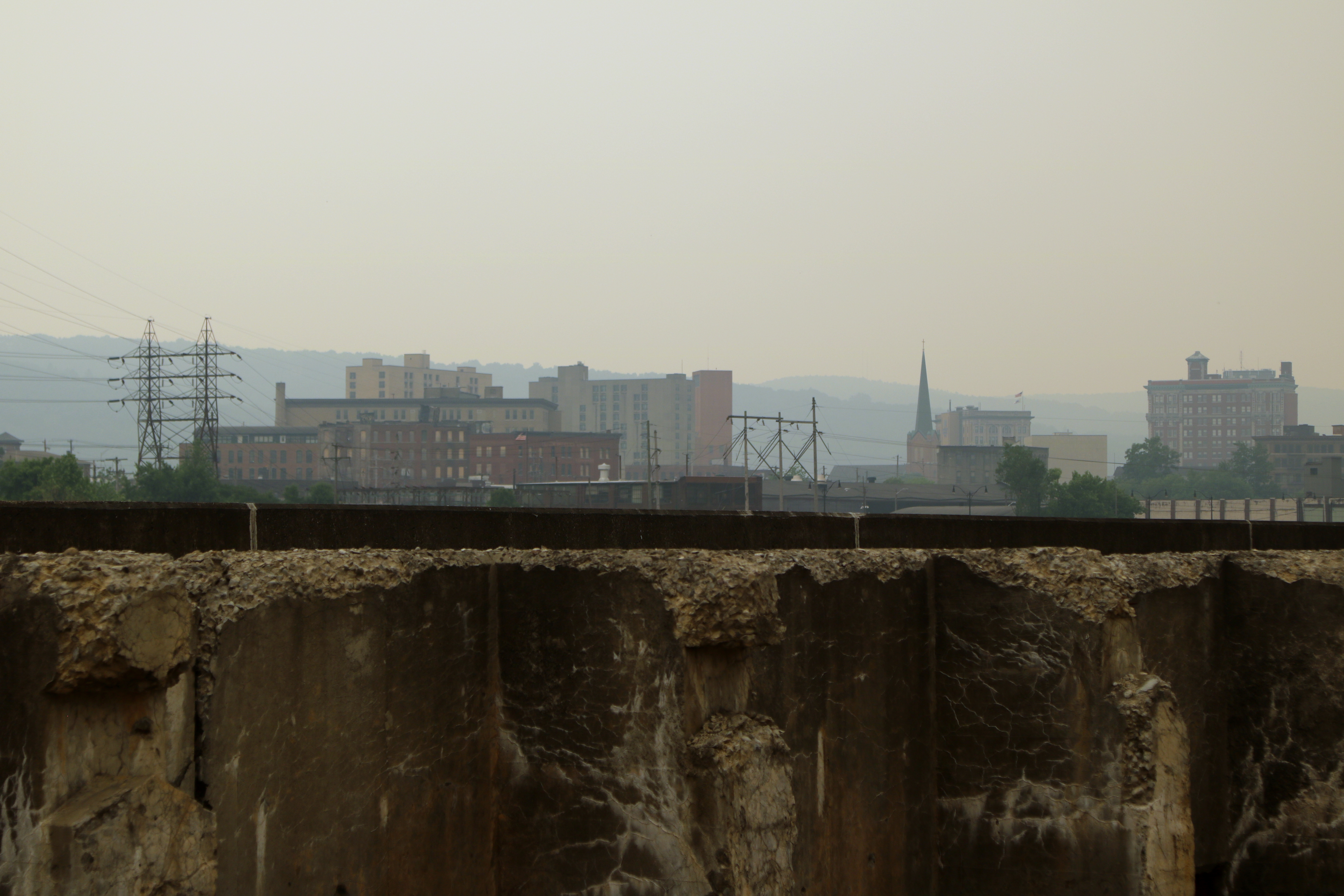
A skyline view of the city of Binghamton, New York, June 6, 2023, from the First Ward neighborhood.

Broome County lies on the southern line of New York. Its southern border abuts the northern boundary of the state of Pennsylvania. The Susquehanna River flows southward through the eastern part of the county, enters Susquehanna County in Pennsylvania, then re-enters Broome and flows northwestward to meet the Chenango River at Binghamton. The combined flow moves west-southwestward into Tioga County to the west. The West Branch Delaware River flows southward along the lower portion of the county's east border, delineating that portion of the border between Broome and Delaware counties.

The county's western portion is hilly, with wide valleys that accommodate Binghamton and its suburbs. In the northern portion, Interstate 81 traverses a wide glacial valley. The eastern part of the county is much more rugged, as the land rises to the Catskill Mountains. The terrain generally slopes to the west. The county's highest point is in the southeast of the county, a U.S. National Geodetic Survey benchmark known as Slawson atop an unnamed hill in the Town of Sanford. It is approximately 2,087 feet (636 m) above sea level. An area due east on the Delaware County line in Oquaga Creek State Park also lies within the same elevation contour line. The lowest point is 864 feet (263 m) above sea level, along the Susquehanna River, at the Pennsylvania state line.

The county has a total area of 716 square miles (1,850 km^{2}), of which 706 square miles (1,830 km^{2}) is land and 9.7 square miles (25 km^{2}) (1.4%) is water.

=== Adjacent counties ===
- Chenango County – northeast
- Delaware County – east
- Wayne County, Pennsylvania – southeast
- Susquehanna County, Pennsylvania – south
- Tioga County – west
- Cortland County – northwest

=== Protected areas ===
- Aqua-Terra Wilderness Area
- Beaver Flow State Forest (part)
- Beaver Pond State Forest
- Cascade Valley State Forest
- Cat Hollow State Forest
- Chenango Valley State Park
- Dorchester County Park
- Greenwood County Park (part)
- Hawkins Pond State Forest
- Marsh Pond State Forest
- Nathaniel Cole County Park
- Oquaga Creek State Park (part)
- Skyline Drive State Forest
- Triangle State Forest
- Whitney Point Multiple Use Area (part)
- Whittacker Swamp State Forest

=== Lakes ===
- Agwaterra Pond
- Blueberry Lake
- Chenango Lake
- Deer Lake
- Fly Pond
- Hawkins Pond
- Hust Pond
- Laurel Lake
- Lily Lake
- Nanticoke Lake
- Oquaga Lake
- Otselic River
- Potato Creek
- Sky Lake
- Summit Lake

=== Major highways ===
- I-81
- I-86 / NY 17 / Southern Tier Expressway / Quickway
- I-88
- US 11
- NY 7
- NY 7A
- NY 7B
- NY 12
- NY 12A
- NY 17C
- NY 26
- NY 38B
- NY 41
- NY 79
- NY 206
- NY 235
- NY 363
- NY 369
- NY 434

== Demographics ==
Historical population
Census	Pop.	Note	%±
1810	8,130		—
1820	14,343		76.4%
1830	17,579		22.6%
1840	22,338		27.1%
1850	30,660		37.3%
1860	35,906		17.1%
1870	44,103		22.8%
1880	49,483		12.2%
1890	62,973		27.3%
1900	69,149		9.8%
1910	78,809		14.0%
1920	113,610		44.2%
1930	147,022		29.4%
1940	165,749		12.7%
1950	184,698		11.4%
1960	212,661		15.1%
1970	221,815		4.3%
1980	213,648		−3.7%
1990	212,160		−0.7%
2000	200,536		−5.5%
2010	200,600		0.0%
2020	198,683		−1.0%
2025 (est.)	195,736	▼	−1.5%
U.S. Decennial Census; 1790–1960 1900–1990; 1990–2000 2010 2020

=== 2020 census ===
Broome County, New York – Racial and ethnic composition Note: the US Census treats Hispanic/Latino as an ethnic category. This table excludes Latinos from the racial categories and assigns them to a separate category. Hispanics/Latinos may be of any race.
Race / Ethnicity (NH = Non-Hispanic)	Pop 1980	Pop 1990	Pop 2000	Pop 2010	Pop 2020	% 1980	% 1990	% 2000	% 2010	% 2020
White alone (NH)	206,697	201,385	181,339	173,074	156,173	96.75%	94.92%	90.43%	86.28%	78.60%
Black or African American alone (NH)	3,065	4,132	6,256	8,850	11,547	1.43%	1.95%	3.12%	4.41%	5.81%
Native American or Alaska Native alone (NH)	252	338	352	328	413	0.12%	0.16%	0.18%	0.16%	0.21%
Asian alone (NH)	1,439	3,640	5,549	7,019	9,337	0.67%	1.72%	2.77%	3.50%	4.70%
Native Hawaiian or Pacific Islander alone (NH)	x	x	47	60	64	x	x	0.02%	0.03%	0.03%
Other race alone (NH)	644	187	252	242	864	0.30%	0.09%	0.13%	0.12%	0.43%
Mixed race or Multiracial (NH)	x	x	2,755	4,249	10,000	x	x	1.37%	2.12%	5.03%
Hispanic or Latino (any race)	1,551	2,478	3,986	6,778	10,285	0.73%	1.17%	1.99%	3.38%	5.18%
Total	213,648	212,160	200,536	200,600	198,683	100.00%	100.00%	100.00%	100.00%	100.00%

=== 2000 census ===
As of the 2000 United States census, there were 200,536 people, 80,749 households, and 50,225 families in the county. The population density was 284 people per square mile (110 people/km^{2}). There were 88,817 housing units at an average density of 125.8 units per square mile (48.6/km^{2}). The racial makeup of the county was 91.33% white, 3.28% black or African American, .19% Native American, 2.79% Asian, .03% Pacific Islander, .79% from other races, and 1.59% from two or more races. 1.99% of the population were Hispanic or Latino of any race. 16.1% were of Irish, 13.3% Italian, 12.3% German, 11.6% English, 6.4% American and 5.7% Polish ancestry according to the census. 91.4% spoke English, 2.0% Spanish and 1.1% Italian as their first language.

There were 80,749 households, out of which 28.20% had children under the age of 18 living with them, 47.60% were married couples living together, 10.80% had a female householder with no husband present, and 37.80% were non-families. 31.00% of all households were made up of individuals, and 12.40% had someone living alone who was 65 years of age or older. The average household size was 2.37 and the average family size was 2.97.

The county population contained 23.00% under the age of 18, 11.00% from 18 to 24, 26.80% from 25 to 44, 22.80% from 45 to 64, and 16.40% who were 65 years of age or older. The median age was 38 years. For every 100 females there were 93.20 males. For every 100 females age 18 and over, there were 89.90 males.

The median income for a household in the county was $35,347, and the median income for a family was $45,422. Males had a median income of $34,426 versus $24,542 for females. The per capita income for the county was $19,168. About 8.80% of families and 12.80% of the population were below the poverty line, including 15.90% of those under age 18 and 7.20% of those age 65 or over.

== Climate ==
Broome has a warm-summer humid continental climate (Dfb) and the hardiness zone is mainly 5b.

Binghamton, New York

Climate chart (precipitation, max. and min. temperature)
J	F	M	A	M	J	J	A	S	O	N	D
2.5 29 16	2.3 32 17	3 41 25	3.4 54 36	3.6 66 46	4.3 74 55	3.7 78 60	3.5 77 58	3.6 68 51	3.3 57 40	3.3 45 31	2.8 33 21
- █ Average max. and min. temperatures in °F
- █ Precipitation totals in inches
Metric conversion
J	F	M	A	M	J	J	A	S	O	N	D
62 −2 −9	59 0 −8	76 5 −4	87 12 2	91 19 8	109 23 13	94 25 15	88 25 15	92 20 10	85 14 5	84 7 0	72 1 −6
- █ Average max. and min. temperatures in °C
- █ Precipitation totals in mm

== Government and politics ==
For the past few decades, Broome County has been a swing county. Since 1964 the county has selected Democratic and Republican party candidates at approximately the same rate in national elections (as of 2024). The more recent elections had favored the Democratic candidate, until Donald Trump carried the county in 2016, the first Republican to win the county since Ronald Reagan in 1984. Joe Biden carried Broome with 50.5% of the vote in 2020. In 2024, the county went for Democrat Kamala Harris, although she only managed to carry it by a 379-vote plurality. In Broome County, Democratic strength comes primarily from Binghamton and its suburbs, such as Johnson City and Endicott, while Republicans dominate the outer, rural parts of the county.

United States presidential election results for Broome County, New York
Year	Republican		Democratic		Third party(ies)	
Year	No.	%	No.	%	No.	%
1884	7,182	52.95%	5,780	42.61%	602	4.44%
1888	8,405	53.70%	6,447	41.19%	801	5.12%
1892	8,259	52.36%	6,040	38.29%	1,474	9.35%
1896	10,630	63.75%	5,461	32.75%	583	3.50%
1900	10,397	58.00%	6,652	37.11%	877	4.89%
1904	10,853	59.53%	6,480	35.55%	897	4.92%
1908	10,705	58.15%	6,671	36.24%	1,032	5.61%
1912	7,949	43.55%	6,533	35.79%	3,770	20.66%
1916	11,445	53.34%	8,906	41.51%	1,105	5.15%
1920	24,759	68.96%	9,251	25.77%	1,893	5.27%
1924	28,262	67.70%	9,289	22.25%	4,198	10.06%
1928	39,860	65.25%	19,563	32.02%	1,669	2.73%
1932	32,751	57.97%	22,802	40.36%	941	1.67%
1936	36,945	54.65%	29,708	43.94%	950	1.41%
1940	44,013	57.70%	32,092	42.07%	179	0.23%
1944	44,013	58.52%	31,056	41.29%	137	0.18%
1948	43,110	60.73%	25,654	36.14%	2,222	3.13%
1952	64,738	71.38%	25,833	28.48%	119	0.13%
1956	67,024	74.27%	23,217	25.73%	0	0.00%
1960	56,467	59.44%	38,462	40.49%	62	0.07%
1964	32,048	35.16%	59,021	64.76%	70	0.08%
1968	46,872	52.48%	37,451	41.93%	4,988	5.58%
1972	55,736	59.84%	37,154	39.89%	245	0.26%
1976	50,340	55.53%	39,827	43.93%	491	0.54%
1980	39,275	43.99%	37,013	41.46%	12,992	14.55%
1984	58,109	60.47%	37,658	39.19%	322	0.34%
1988	47,610	49.41%	48,130	49.95%	625	0.65%
1992	34,653	34.71%	43,444	43.51%	21,749	21.78%
1996	31,327	36.09%	44,407	51.15%	11,080	12.76%
2000	36,946	42.43%	45,381	52.11%	4,757	5.46%
2004	43,568	47.41%	46,281	50.37%	2,041	2.22%
2008	40,077	45.11%	47,204	53.14%	1,556	1.75%
2012	37,641	46.15%	41,970	51.46%	1,954	2.40%
2016	40,943	47.57%	39,212	45.56%	5,917	6.87%
2020	43,800	47.08%	47,010	50.53%	2,221	2.39%
2024	44,763	49.17%	45,142	49.59%	1,129	1.24%

Broome County's offices are housed in the Edwin L. Crawford County Office Building of Government Plaza located at 60 Hawley Street in Downtown Binghamton.

=== Executive ===
Broome County Executives
Name	Party	Term
Edwin L. Crawford	Republican	1969–1976
Donald L. McManus	Democratic	1977–1980
Carl S. Young	Republican	1981–1988
Timothy M. Grippen	Democratic	1989–1996
Jeffrey P. Kraham	Republican	1997–2004
Barbara J. Fiala	Democratic	2005–Apr. 15, 2011
Patrick J. Brennan	Democratic	Apr. 16, 2011–Dec. 31, 2011
Debra A. Preston	Republican	Jan. 1, 2012–Dec. 31, 2016
Jason T. Garnar	Democratic	Jan. 1, 2017–

=== Legislature ===
The Broome County Legislature consists of 15 members. The 15 legislature members are elected from individual districts. As of 2026, there are 10 Republicans and 5 Democrats.

Broome County Legislature
District	Legislator	Title	Party	Residence
1	Stephen J. Flagg		Republican	Colesville
2	Scott D. Baker		Republican	Windsor
3	Kelly F. Wildoner		Republican	Conklin
4	Kim A. Myers	Minority Leader	Democratic	Vestal
5	Daniel J. Reynolds	Chair	Republican	Vestal
6	Greg W. Baldwin		Republican	Endicott
7	Matthew J. Pasquale	Majority Leader	Republican	Endicott
8	Jason E. Shaw		Republican	Endwell
9	Matthew J. Hilderbrant		Republican	Whitney Point
10	Erin V. Micha		Republican	Fenton
11	Susan V. Ryan		Democratic	Binghamton
12	Louis P. Augostini		Republican	Dickinson
13	Robert Weslar		Democratic	Binghamton
14	Mary Kaminsky		Democratic	Binghamton
15	Timothy D. Ames		Democratic	Binghamton

=== Party affiliation ===
Voter registration as of February 21, 2020
Party	Active voters	Inactive voters	Total voters	Percentage
Democratic	44,335	5,694	50,029	37.59%
Republican	41,318	3,895	45,213	33.97%
Unaffiliated	23,535	4,051	27,586	20.73%
Other (Note: Included are voters affiliated with the Conservative Party, Green Party, Working Families Party, Independence Party, Women's Equality Party, Reform Party, and other small parties.)	8,980	1,273	10,253	7.70%
Total	118,168	14,913	133,081	100%

=== Law enforcement ===
In Broome County, law enforcement services are provided by local, county, state, and federal law enforcement professionals.

At the federal level:

- United States Marshals Service (located in the federal courthouse in downtown Binghamton)
- Customs and Border Protection (Greater Binghamton Airport located in Johnson City)
- Transportation Security Administration (Greater Binghamton Airport located in Johnson City)
- Federal Protective Service (federal & GSA properties located in Downtown Binghamton)

At the state level:

- New York State Police
- New York State Court Officers
- New York State Park Police
- New York State Department of Environmental Conservation Police
- New York State University Police (Binghamton University)
- SUNY Broome Office of Public Safety
  - Peace officers

At the county level:

- Broome County office of sheriff
- Broome County district attorney
  - Criminal investigators
  - School resource officers contracted through the DA's office
- Broome County Government Security Division (NYS peace officers with quasi-law enforcement status, including powers of arrest and carrying firearms. They are located at county property, as well as county events.)

At the local level:

- Binghamton Police Department
- Endicott Police Department
- Johnson City Police Department
- Vestal Police Department
- Port Dickinson Police Department

Additionally, the 536-bed Broome County Jail is operated by the Broome County sheriff's office.

The Broome County Law Enforcement Academy facilitates the New York State-mandated basic course for police officers, which includes over 700 hours of instruction. All municipal police officers and deputy sheriffs within Broome County attend this academy. In addition, oftentimes officers from outside Greater Binghamton attend the academy. The academy frequently hosts officers from the Elmira-Corning area, Syracuse metropolitan area, and other regions within New York State.

== Education ==
The primary institutes of higher education in Broome County include:

- Binghamton University (enrollment 18,500)
- Broome Community College (BCC or SUNY Broome)
- Davis College – a private Christian college founded in Johnson City, though the campus is now defunct and sits empty.

== Communities ==
Map of Broome County, New York, showing towns, villages, and CDPs.

=== Cities, villages, census-designated places ===
#	Location	Population	Type
1	Binghamton†	47,969	City
2	Johnson City	15,343	Village
3	Endicott	13,667	Village
4	Endwell	11,762	CDP
5	Binghamton University	7,261	CDP
6	Chenango Bridge	2,884	CDP
7	Port Dickinson	1,699	Village
8	Deposit‡	1,387	Village
9	Whitney Point	960	Village
9	Windsor	907	Village
10	Glen Aubrey	446	CDP
11	Lisle	348	Village

† – County seat, ‡ – Partially in Delaware County

=== Towns ===
- Barker
- Binghamton
- Chenango
- Colesville
- Conklin
- Dickinson
- Fenton
- Kirkwood
- Lisle
- Maine
- Nanticoke
- Sanford
- Triangle
- Union
- Vestal
- Windsor

=== Hamlets ===
- Castle Creek
- Center Lisle
- Chenango Bridge
- Chenango Forks
- Glen Castle
- Hawleyton
- Hillcrest
- Hydeville
- Itaska
- Kattelville
- Newmans Corners
- Nimmonsburg
- North Fenton
- Nineveh
- Pleasant Hill
- Port Crane
- Quinneville
- Summit Hill
- West Chenango
- Wyman Corner

== Notable people ==
- John Allen, dentist and inventor of new denture method
- Joel Bennett (b. 1970), former Professional baseball Pitcher for the Philadelphia Phillies and Baltimore Orioles, and current PE educator.
- Ira Cook (1821–1902), Iowa land surveyor and businessman, born in Broome County
- Daniel S. Dickinson (1800–1866), US Senator, lived in Broome County
- John Ducey (b. 1969), actor, born in Broome County
- Barzillai Gray (1824–1918), judge, born in Broome County
- Robert Harpur (1731–1825), colonial teacher, politician, pioneer, for whom Harpur College (now Binghamton University) was named, settled at Harpursville
- Johnny Hart (1931–2007), cartoonist, creator of B.C. and co-creator of The Wizard of Id, born in Broome County
- George F. Johnson (1857–1948), industrialist, philanthropist, co-founder of Endicott-Johnson Co., lived in Broome County
- Willis Sharpe Kilmer (1867–1940), industrialist and entrepreneur, lived in Broome County
- Rebecca Krohn, ballet dancer, born in Broome County
- Edwin A. Link (1904–1981), inventor, raised in Broome County
- David Ross Locke (1833–1888), Civil War journalist, born in Broome County
- Ron Luciano (1937–1995), baseball umpire, author, born in Broome County
- Billy Martin (1928–1989), baseball player, manager, retired to Broome County
- Leonard Melfi (1932–2001), author, playwright, born in Broome County
- Mary Blair Moody (1837–1919), physician, anatomist, born in Broome County
- Hidy Ochiai (b. 1939), karate and judo grand master, author, actor, resides in Broome County
- Camille Paglia (b. 1947), philosopher, author, born in Broome County
- Alice Freeman Palmer (1855–1902), educator, born in Broome County
- Amy Sedaris (b. 1961), actress, author, playwright, born in Broome County
- David Sedaris (b. 1956), comedian, essayist, playwright, born in Broome County
- Rod Serling (1924–1975), screenwriter, playwright, raised in Broome County
- Jack Sharkey (1902–1994), born Joseph Paul Cukoschay, world heavyweight boxing champion, 1931–33, born in Broome County

== See also ==
- List of counties in New York
- National Register of Historic Places listings in Broome County, New York
