= Barbara J. Fiala =

American politician (born 1944)

Commissioner of the New York State Department of Motor Vehicles
- In office 2011–2014
- Governor: Andrew Cuomo
- Preceded by: David Swarts
- Succeeded by: Mark J. F. Schroeder

6th Broome County Executive
- In office 2005–2010
- Preceded by: Jeffrey P. Kraham
- Succeeded by: Patrick J. Brennan

Broome County Clerk
- In office 1999–2004

Personal details
- Born: May 13, 1944 (age 82) Binghamton, New York
- Party: Democratic
- Spouse: Anthony Fiala Sr
- Children: Jim Fiala, Anthony Fiala Jr
- Education: Broome Community College; Binghamton University
- Website: http://www.barbfiala.com

Barbara J. Fiala is the former Commissioner of the New York State Department of Motor Vehicles and County Executive of Broome County, New York. Fiala also served as Broome County Clerk from 1999 to 2004. She was the first female County Executive of Broome County and served as President of the New York State Association of County Executives. On July 30, 2015, Fiala officially announced her candidacy for the New York State Senate's 52nd district. The seat became vacant after then-Senator Thomas W. Libous was convicted of a Federal felony of lying to the FBI. Fiala was defeated in the November election by Fred Akshar, the Republican nominee.

== Political career ==
=== Broome County Executive ===
Fiala served as Broome County Executive from 2005 until 2010, when she was appointed Commissioner of the New York State Department of Motor Vehicles. She was elected in 2004 and re-elected in 2008. During her tenure as County Executive, the Greater Binghamton Transportation Center was developed, the George Harvey Justice Building was refurbished, and a number of small business development programs were launched. Fiala touts bipartisan cooperation as the reason for her accomplishments as County Executive.

=== Commissioner of the New York State Department of Motor Vehicles ===
Fiala was appointed Commissioner of the New York State Department of Motor Vehicles in 2011, and served until the end of 2014. During her tenure, the state placed a higher priority on online services. The DMV website was redesigned and many motor vehicle transactions were added to the website. Additionally, the DMV launched lifetime adventure licenses for hunting, fishing, skiing, and boating. The adventure license offered New York residents a chance to list all adventure licenses on their drivers license, and the adventure licenses do not expire.

=== Campaign for New York State Senate ===
Upon the conviction of former New York State Senator Thomas W. Libous, Fiala announced her candidacy for the vacated senate seat. She launched her campaign for the November 2015 special election in July promising to bring jobs to the Southern Tier. Fiala said, "The one major issue here in the Southern Tier is jobs, good-paying jobs."

In November 2015 Fiala was defeated in the State Senate election by Republican Fred Akshar.

== Electoral history ==
General Election November 2, 2004, Broome County Executive
Party	Candidate	Votes	%
Democratic	Barbara Fiala	40,739	43.99
Working Families	Barbara Fiala	2,689	2.90
Republican	Jeff Kraham (Incumbent)	39,711	42.88
Conservative	Jeff Kraham	2,047	2.21
Other	Blank/Void	7,418	8.01
Total votes		92,604	100.0

General Election November 4, 2008, Broome County Executive
Party	Candidate	Votes	%
Democratic	Barbara Fiala (Incumbent)	41,910	46.69
Independence	Barbara Fiala	3,986	4.40
Working Families	Barbara Fiala	2,479	2.76
Republican	Michael Marinaccio	30,097	33.53
Conservative	Michael Marinaccio	2,621	2.92
Other	Blank/Void	8,664	9.65
Total votes		89,757	100.0

Political offices
Preceded by	Broome County, New York County Clerk; January 1, 1998 – December 31, 2004	Succeeded by Richard R. Blythe
Preceded by Jeffrey P. Kraham	Broome County, New York Executive; January 1, 2005 – 2011	Succeeded by Patrick J. Brennan
