= Lea Webb =

American politician

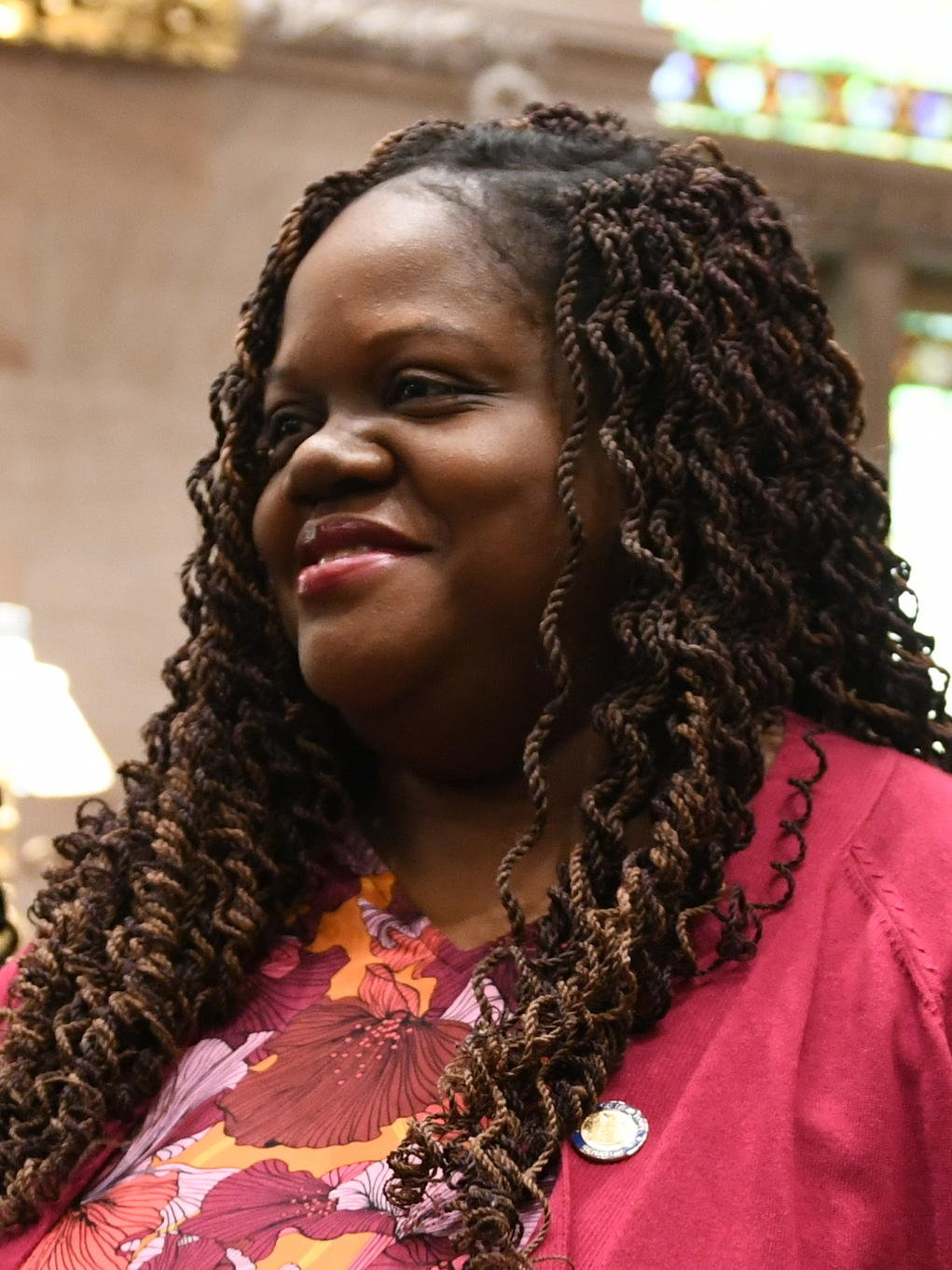
- Webb in 2023

Member of the New York State Senate from the 52nd district
- Incumbent
- Assumed office January 1, 2023
- Preceded by: Fred Akshar

Personal details
- Party: Democratic
- Education: SUNY Broome Community College (AAS); Binghamton University (BS)

Lea Webb is an American politician serving as a member of the New York State Senate for the 52nd district. Elected in November 2022, she assumed office on January 1, 2023.

== Early life and education ==
Webb is a native of the Southern Tier region of New York. She earned an associate degree in liberal arts and sciences from SUNY Broome Community College and a Bachelor of Science in neuroscience from Binghamton University.

== Career ==
From 2004 to 2006, Webb worked for the Mothers and Babies Perinatal Network in Binghamton, New York. She served as an organizer for Citizen Action of New York and was elected to the Binghamton City Council in 2008, becoming the youngest person, until Conrad Taylor was elected in 2015, and first African-American to ever serve on the council.

=== New York State Senate ===
Webb was elected to represent New York's 52nd Senate District in the 2022 general election, defeating former Binghamton Mayor Rich David. She is the first black woman to represent the 52nd Senate District. The district includes all of Cortland and Tompkins counties and a portion of Broome County, including the city of Binghamton and the towns of Binghamton, Chenango, Dickinson, Lisle, Maine, Nanticoke, Union and Vestal.

On December 23, 2022, Webb expressed her opposition to Governor Kathy Hochul's nomination of Hector LaSalle for Chief Judge of the New York Court of Appeals. Webb based her decision on LaSalle's past decisions on workers rights and reproductive care. On April 18, 2023, Webb voted to confirm Rowan Wilson as the state's first black Chief Judge.

On January 24, 2023, Webb was commended "for her critical work" as "Chair of the Senate Women’s Issues Committee" in a press release by the New York State Senate Majority regarding passage of the Equal Rights Amendment referendum in the Senate.

Webb and her colleagues successfully advocated for $5 million in state funding to be allocated to local theatres from the Fiscal Year 2023-2024 State Budget, as part of New York's Alive Downtowns! initiative.

On May 24, 2023, Webb introduced a bill that would specifically ban TV and film companies from qualifying for lucrative state tax breaks if they use “synthetic media in any component of production that would displace any natural person.”

== Electoral history ==
=== New York State Senate ===
New York's 52nd Senatorial District 2022 General Election
Party	Candidate	Votes	%	±%
Democratic	Lea Webb	51,986	50.7%	+50.7%
Republican	Rich David	50,567	49.3%	−38.1%
Total votes		102,553	100.00%	N/A
Democratic gain from Republican				
