= Raymond P. Martinez =

American government official

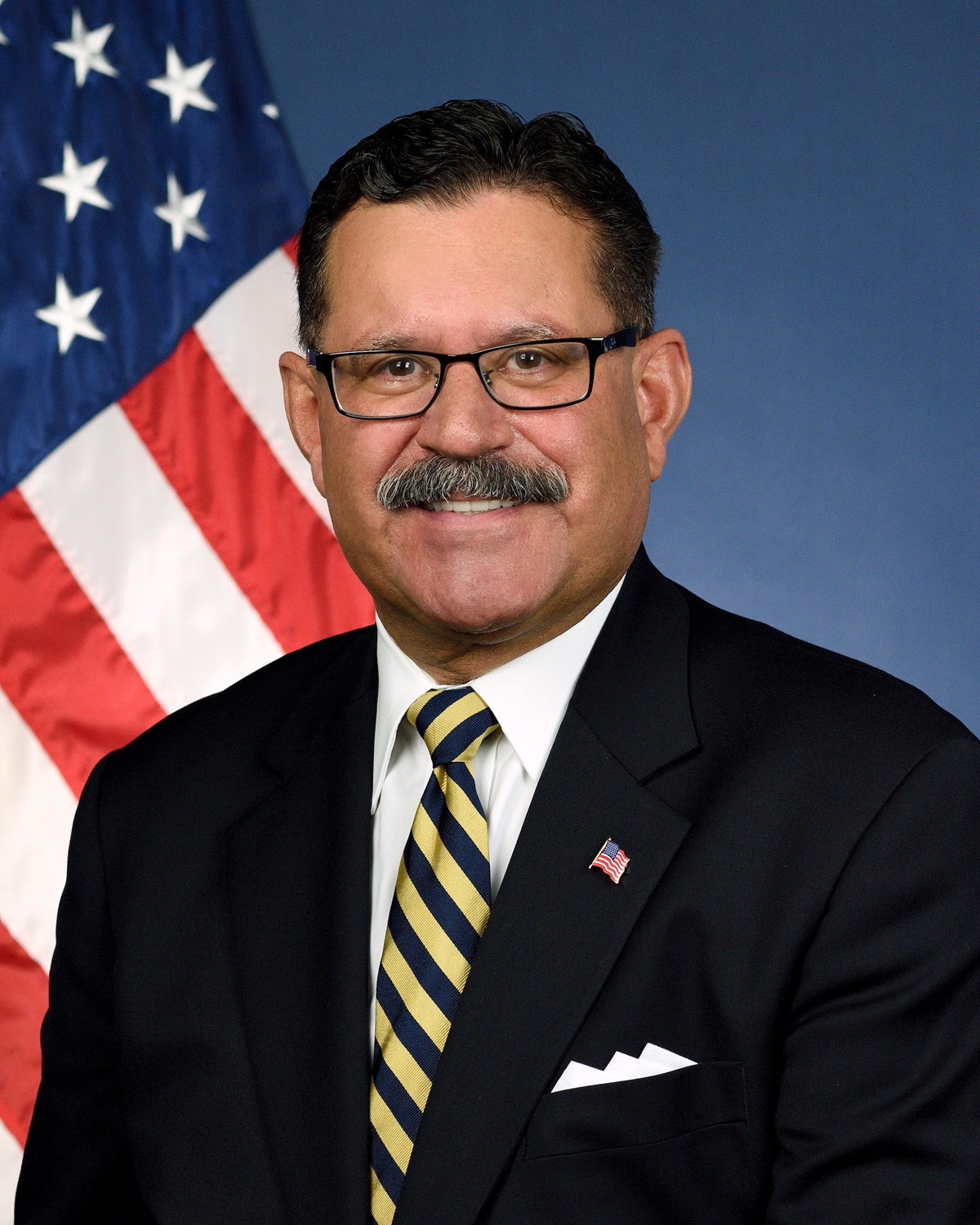
- Martinez in 2018

6th Administrator of the Federal Motor Carrier Safety Administration
- In office February 28, 2018 – October 31, 2019
- President: Donald Trump
- Preceded by: T. F. Scott Darling III
- Succeeded by: Robin Hutcheson (2022)

New Jersey Motor Vehicle Commission Chair & Chief Administrator
- In office February 1, 2010 – January 16, 2018
- Governor: Chris Christie
- Preceded by: Shawn B. Sheekey
- Succeeded by: Brenda Sue Fulton

Deputy Chief of Protocol of the United States
- In office December 12, 2005 – January 20, 2009
- President: George W. Bush

Commissioner of the New York State Department of Motor Vehicles
- In office 2000–2005
- Governor: George Pataki
- Preceded by: Richard E. Jackson
- Succeeded by: Nancy Naples

Personal details
- Party: Republican
- Education: B.S. C.W. Post; J.D. St. John's University
- Profession: Attorney

Raymond P. Martinez was a Senior Advisor at the U.S. Department of Transportation and the former Administrator of the Federal Motor Carrier Safety Administration. From 2010 to 2018, Martinez served as the New Jersey Motor Vehicle Commission Chair and Chief Administrator in the Cabinet of Governor Chris Christie. He previously served as Deputy Chief of Protocol for the United States Department of State and as Commissioner of the New York Department of Motor Vehicles in the Cabinet of Governor George Pataki.

Martinez was an aide in the New York State Senate and worked as an attorney in private practice, including working for Citibank. He also served in the Reagan administration as first lady Nancy Reagan’s deputy director of scheduling and advance, and was a special assistant in the New York office of the United States Department of Housing and Urban Development.

== Biography ==
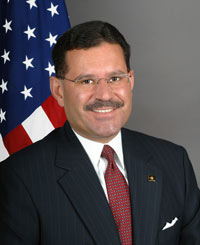
Martinez's portrait, c. 2005

Martinez is a graduate of St. John's University School of Law and C.W. Post College of Long Island University.

From 1989 through 2005, Martinez served on numerous White House advance teams for domestic and international trips of Presidents Ronald Reagan, George H. W. Bush and George W. Bush. In President Ronald Reagan's administration, he was Deputy Director for Scheduling and Advance at the White House for First Lady Nancy Reagan and also served as a Special Assistant at the New York Regional Office of the United States Department of Housing and Urban Development. Previously, Martinez worked as a Legislative Aide for the New York State Senate.

Martinez served as Commissioner of the New York Department of Motor Vehicles under Governor George Pataki from December 2000 to December 2005; as Assistant General Counsel to the Long Island (New York) Power Authority; as Special Counsel and Deputy Chief of Staff for the New York State Attorney General; and as an attorney in private practice.

Martinez was sworn in as Deputy Chief of Protocol of the United States on December 12, 2005. As Deputy Chief, Martinez served as the chief operating officer of the Office of the Chief of Protocol, as well as Acting Chief of Protocol in the absence of the Chief. In this role, Martinez oversaw the visits of chiefs of state, heads of government and other international dignitaries who were in the United States to meet with the President, Vice President or Secretary of State. He also accompanied delegations representing the President at official ceremonies abroad.

On February 1, 2010, Martinez was nominated to the position of Chief Administrator of the New Jersey Motor Vehicle Commission by Governor Chris Christie and he was confirmed by the State Senate. In that position he directed approximately 2,400 employees at 71 locations throughout the state.

In 2017 Martinez was nominated by the President to serve as the Administrator of the Federal Motor Carrier Safety Administration and he was unanimously confirmed to that position by the United States Senate. In 2019 Martinez was appointed a Senior Advisor at the Department and tasked with overseeing the redevelopment of the John A. Volpe National Transportation Systems Center in Cambridge, MA for the USDOT. The initiative is a $750 million project coordinated between the USDOT, the U.S General Services Administration and the Massachusetts Institute of Technology intended to deliver a new national research center for the Department of Transportation and add new development on a central 14-acre (5.7 ha) parcel in the middle of the Kendall Square neighborhood of Cambridge. He retired in October 2019.

Government offices
Preceded by Richard E. Jackson, Jr.	New York State Commissioner of Motor Vehicles; December 2000 – December 2005	Succeeded by Nancy A. Naples
Preceded by ?	Deputy Chief of Protocol of the United States; 2005–2009	Succeeded by ?
Preceded by Shawn B. Sheekey	New Jersey Commissioner of Motor Vehicles; 2010–2018	Succeeded by Brenda Sue Fulton
Preceded by T. F. Scott Darling III	Administrator of the Federal Motor Carrier Safety Administration; 2018–2019	Succeeded by Jim Mullen (acting)
