= New York's 52nd State Senate district =

American legislative district

Senator
| Lea Webb; D–Binghamton |
- Registration: 37.3% Republican; 34.1% Democratic; 20.8% No party preference
- Demographics: 87% White; 4% Black; 3% Hispanic; 3% Asian
- Population (2017): 284,126
- Registered voters: 186,339

New York's 52nd State Senate district is one of 63 districts in the New York State Senate. It has been represented by Democrat Lea Webb since the 2023 general election to succeed Republican Fred Akshar.

== Recent election results ==
=== 2026 ===
2026 New York State Senate election, District 52
| Party | Candidate | Votes | % |
|---|---|---|---|
| Democratic | Lea Webb | | |
| Working Families | Lea Webb | | |
| Total | Lea Webb (incumbent) | | |
| Republican | Michael Bolles | | |
| Conservative | Michael Bolles | | |
| Total | Michael Bolles | | |
| Write-in | | | |
| Total votes | | | |

=== 2024 ===
2024 New York State Senate election, District 52
| Party | Candidate | Votes | % |
|---|---|---|---|
| Democratic | Lea Webb | 69,643 | |
| Working Families | Lea Webb | 9,532 | |
| Total | Lea Webb (incumbent) | 79,175 | 57.5 |
| Republican | Michael Sigler | 56,361 | |
| Local 607 | Michael Sigler | 2,068 | |
| Total | Michael Sigler | 58,429 | 42.4 |
| Write-in | | 140 | 0.1 |
| Total votes | | 137,744 | 100.0 |
| Democratic hold | | | |

=== 2022 ===
2022 New York State Senate election, District 52
Primary election
| Party | Candidate | Votes | % |
|---|---|---|---|
| Democratic | Lea Webb | 11,389 | 61.2 |
| Democratic | Leslie Burke | 7,204 | 38.7 |
| Write-in | | 14 | 0.1 |
| Total votes | | 18,607 | 100.0 |
General election
| Democratic | Lea Webb | 46,088 | |
| Working Families | Lea Webb | 7,763 | |
| Total | Lea Webb | 53,851 | 51.1 |
| Republican | Richard David | 46,018 | |
| Conservative | Richard David | 5,436 | |
| Total | Richard David | 51,454 | 48.8 |
| Write-in | | 86 | 0.1 |
| Total votes | | 105,391 | 100.0 |
| Democratic win (new boundaries) | | | |

=== 2020 ===
2020 New York State Senate election, District 52
| Party | Candidate | Votes | % |
|---|---|---|---|
| Republican | Fred Akshar | 80,745 | |
| Independence | Fred Akshar | 8,432 | |
| Conservative | Fred Akshar | 6,875 | |
| Total | Fred Akshar (incumbent) | 96,052 | 86.6 |
| Libertarian | Thomas Quiter | 13,802 | 12.5 |
| Write-in | | 1,011 | 0.9 |
| Total votes | | 110,865 | 100.0 |
| Republican hold | | | |

=== 2018 ===
2018 New York State Senate election, District 52
| Party | Candidate | Votes | % |
|---|---|---|---|
| Republican | Fred Akshar | 66,559 | |
| Independence | Fred Akshar | 7,562 | |
| Conservative | Fred Akshar | 5,797 | |
| Reform | Fred Akshar | 1,176 | |
| Total | Fred Akshar (incumbent) | 81,094 | 98.7 |
| Write-in | | 1,085 | 1.3 |
| Total votes | | 82,179 | 100.0 |
| Republican hold | | | |

=== 2016 ===
2016 New York State Senate election, District 52
| Party | Candidate | Votes | % |
|---|---|---|---|
| Republican | Fred Akshar | 75,983 | |
| Conservative | Fred Akshar | 7,214 | |
| Independence | Fred Akshar | 4,741 | |
| Reform | Fred Akshar | 1,242 | |
| Total | Fred Akshar (incumbent) | 89,180 | 74.4 |
| Democratic | Sharon Ball | 27,563 | |
| Working Families | Sharon Ball | 3,008 | |
| Total | Sharon Ball | 30,571 | 25.5 |
| Write-in | | 71 | 0.1 |
| Total votes | | 119,822 | 100.0 |
| Republican hold | | | |

=== 2015 special ===
2015 New York State Senate special election, District 52
| Party | Candidate | Votes | % |
|---|---|---|---|
| Republican | Fred Akshar | 37,650 | |
| Conservative | Fred Akshar | 3,754 | |
| Independence | Fred Akshar | 3,753 | |
| Total | Fred Akshar | 45,157 | 77.7 |
| Democratic | Barbara Fiala | 11,209 | |
| Working Families | Barbara Fiala | 1,134 | |
| Total | Barbara Fiala | 12,343 | 21.2 |
| Write-in | | 630 | 1.1 |
| Total votes | | 58,130 | 100.0 |
| Republican hold | | | |

=== 2014 ===
2014 New York State Senate election, District 52
Primary election
| Party | Candidate | Votes | % |
|---|---|---|---|
| Republican | Thomas Libous (incumbent) | 7,563 | 64.1 |
| Republican | Denver Jones | 4,232 | 35.9 |
| Write-in | | 0 | 0.0 |
| Total votes | | 11,795 | 100.0 |
General election
| Republican | Thomas Libous | 39,842 | |
| Conservative | Thomas Libous | 3,915 | |
| Independence | Thomas Libous | 2,313 | |
| Total | Thomas Libous (incumbent) | 46,070 | 62.0 |
| Democratic | Anndrea Starzak | 24,024 | |
| Working Families | Anndrea Starzak | 3,956 | |
| Total | Anndrea Starzak | 27,980 | 37.7 |
| Write-in | | 245 | 0.3 |
| Total votes | | 74,295 | 100.0 |
| Republican hold | | | |

=== 2012 ===
2012 New York State Senate election, District 52
| Party | Candidate | Votes | % |
|---|---|---|---|
| Republican | Thomas Libous | 62,875 | |
| Conservative | Thomas Libous | 4,775 | |
| Independence | Thomas Libous | 4,262 | |
| Total | Thomas Libous (incumbent) | 71,912 | 63.9 |
| Democratic | John Orzel | 37,856 | 33.6 |
| Working Families | Barrett Esworthy | 2,798 | 2.5 |
| Write-in | | 41 | 0.0 |
| Total votes | | 112,607 | 100.0 |
| Republican hold | | | |

=== Federal results in District 52 ===
| Year | Office | Results |
|---|---|---|
| 2020 | President | Trump 51.0 – 46.5% |
| 2016 | President | Trump 51.9 – 42.4% |
| 2012 | President | Obama 49.2 – 48.6% |
| 2012 | Senate | Gillibrand 61.9 – 36.2% |
