= Broome County Alms House =

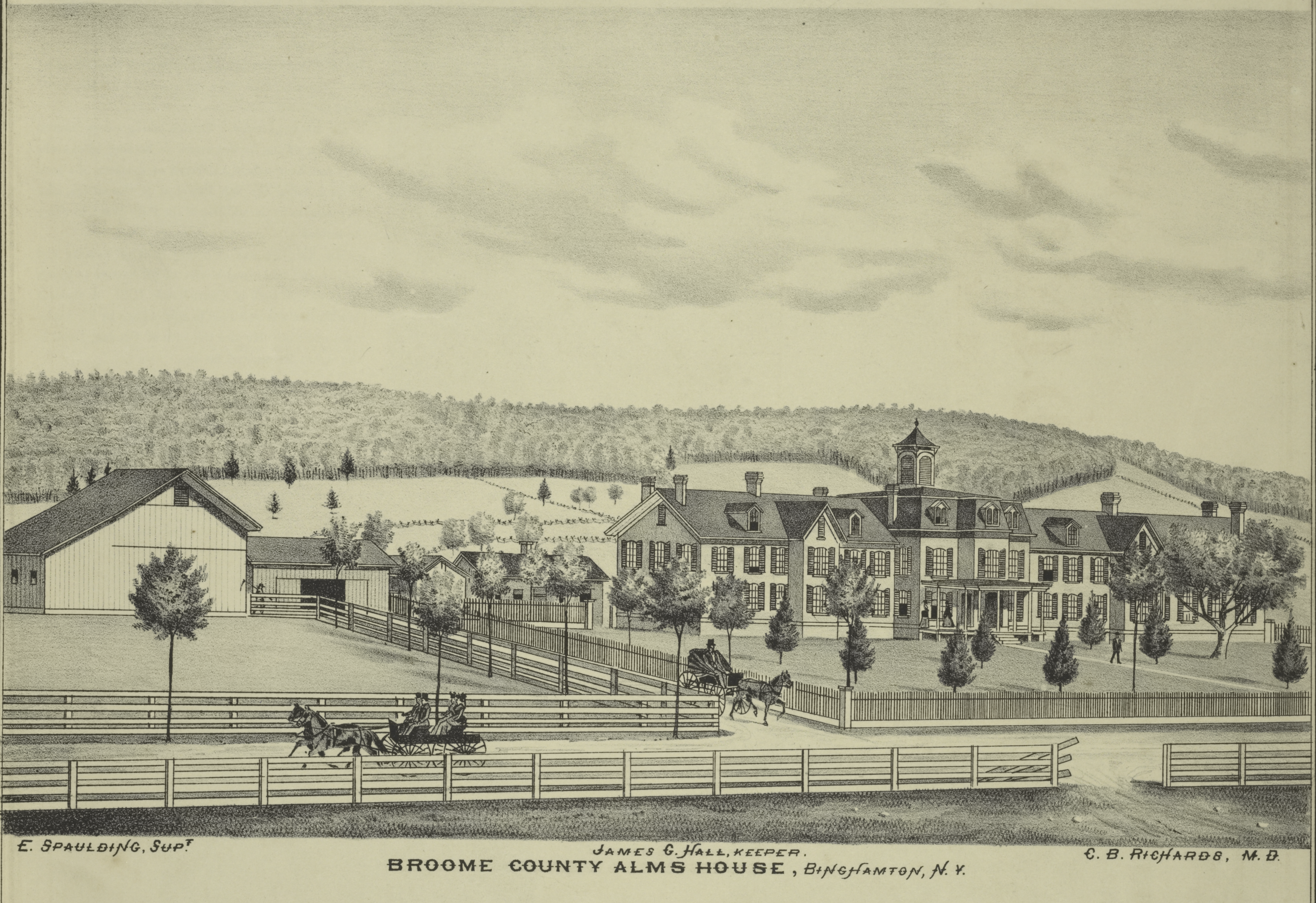
- Broome County Alms House, 1876
- Interactive map of Broome County Alms House
- 42°8′2″N 75°54′22″W
- Location: Broome County, New York

History
- Built: c. 1833
- Demolished: 5 February 2010

The Broome County Alms House, was located in the town of Dickinson, three miles north of Binghamton in Broome county, New York. The red brick building operated as a shelter for the poor, take care of the sick, disabled, mentally unwell, widowed, and orphaned persons in the community until c. 1960. The goal of the almshouse was to both help break the cycle of poverty and to care for members of the community who had no means of caring take of themselves. The building was demolished on February 5, 2010.

== History ==
In the early 19th century New York communities sought a more permanent and centralized solution for paupers, a group which included the poor, sick, orphaned, homeless, and the mentally ill. The Broome County Poor Farm was created in 1833, opening with 19 inmates that were declared wards of the state by the Superintendents of the Poor. In the early decades of its creations, “the courts would send those without a fixed residence or income either to jail or to the poor farm for “pauperism”‘. Other reasons for residency included idiocy, lunacy, blindness, sickness, old age, children with sick or destitute parents, deaf and dumb and "women with sick husbands”.

During the mid 19th century, the diagnoses, treatment, and attitude towards mental illness, mental and physical disability allowed for and was found to be practical to lump people with a wide vary of incapacities together with the sick and poor. Young orphans and the elderly were large percentages of the early inmates. Before the Child Care Act of 1875, which no longer allowed children from the age of four to fifteen as residents of poor farms, orphans and children of sick and incapable parents lived, worked, and slept alongside the resident inmates. Concerning the elderly, for those unable or unwilling to take care of ailing or aging geriatric family, the poor farm took on the role of a nursing home. Some families gave small sums of money to the poor farm for the act of ”caring” for the members of their family.

The inmates lived a very structured life, consisting of small meals, cramped and dirty living conditions, and for those capable, long hours of work in the farm fields. There was no smoking, drinking, cursing, or any recreational activates of any kind. Violation of these rules was punishable by solitary confinement with only bread and water for nourishment.

In 1855 the Board of Supervisors of Broome County started including the residents in the census for the county. However it is known that in 1831, 19 people were living in the Almshouse. They were declared wards of the county and were cared for at a rate of forty cents per person weekly. The superintendent's plan was daily work for all that were able, with no recreation, smoking was prohibited unless you have a special permit, no letters could be sent or received without permission and inspection from the superintendent, and the residents could not leave the campus. The only form of literature allowed were for religious and moral studies. If a resident broke a rule or was disobedient they would be forced into solitary confinement with a diet on bread and water.

In 1861 Milo D. Payne was appointed as Keeper of the Alms House with a duty to manage the residence and farm. He had the residents work the farm and do their chores but now they were well fed and clothed. Payne handled the money carefully and economically and as a result of his care and management the Almshouse and residents started to thrive.

As care of the insane began shifting to state institutions began in 1890, it resulted in a reduction of "able bodied workers". In 1923 an infirmary was built for the inmates. Fees for the inmates were $5.66. The buildings, now segregated for women and men, were modernized. The Almshouse became a more humanitarian and modernized way to care for the residents. Additional facilities included a bakery and laundry.

By 1929 the almshouse went through many new revised laws. Residents were now able to leave the facility after obtaining a pass indicating the date, the time they left, and when they must return. Another law required all purchases by the residents were to be known and logged by the current keeper.

Closed as an almshouse in the 1960s the structure and property were incorporated into the Broome Technical Community College and used for classroom space.

== Demolition ==
Beginning in 1978, consideration was made to demolish the remaining structures, now located on the campus of SUNY Broome. It was estimated to cost 2–4 million dollars to properly renovate the building. After sitting vacant for 10 years it was deemed "unsafe" and "beyond repair". Arguments for preserving the facility included being the last remaining physical evidence of the historic poor house, potential reuse and relocation of the building, which subsequently was determined eligible for the National Register of Historic Places.

The almshouse was demolished on February 5, 2010, at a cost between $700,000 and $800,000 shared between the state and county, and was part of a 10-year plan to improve the college.
