= Thomas W. Libous =

American politician (1953–2010)

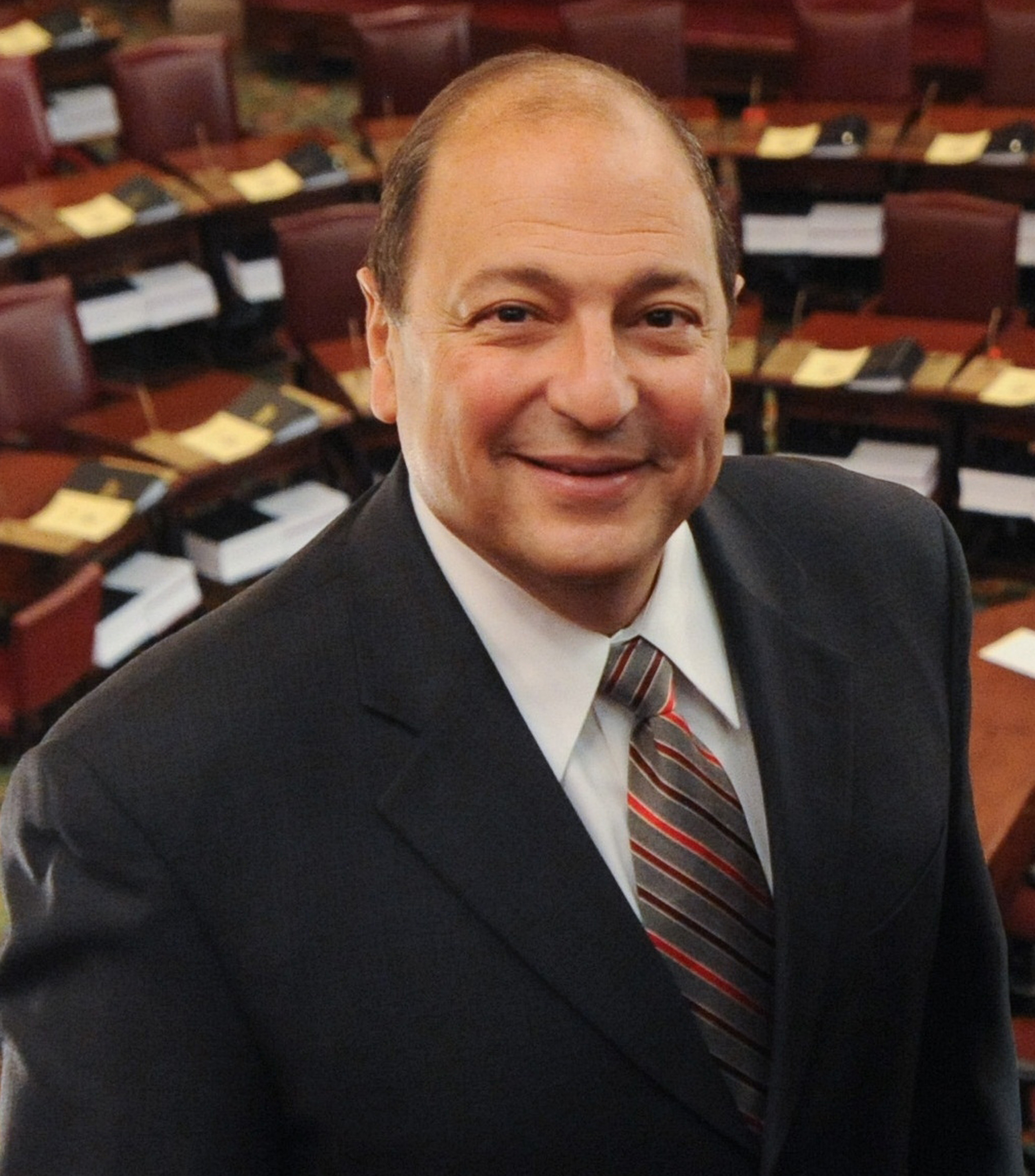

Member of the New York State Senate
- In office January 4, 1989 – July 22, 2015
- Preceded by: Warren M. Anderson
- Succeeded by: Fred Akshar
- Constituency: 51st district (1989–2002); 52nd district (2003–2015)

Personal details
- Born: April 16, 1953 Johnson City, New York, U.S.
- Died: May 3, 2016 (aged 63) Endicott, New York
- Party: Republican
- Spouse: Frances Libous
- Children: Matthew; Nicholas
- Education: State University of New York, Broome; State University of New York, Utica

Thomas W. Libous (April 14, 1953 – May 3, 2016) was an American politician who served as a member of the New York State Senate from the 52nd Senate District, representing the counties of Broome, Tioga, Chenango and Delaware.

A Republican, Libous served on the Binghamton City Council in the 1980s. He was first elected to the State Senate in 1988 and won a total of 14 terms in the Senate, eventually rising to the position of deputy majority leader. An influential Albany dealmaker, Libous was notable for his advocacy for New York's Southern Tier. He continued serving in the Senate for several years following a 2009 terminal cancer diagnosis. On July 22, 2015, Libous forfeited his Senate seat when he was found guilty of lying to the FBI. His conviction was vacated following his death.

== Early life, education, and early career ==
Libous was president of his senior class at Johnson City High School. At a young age, he worked at his family's grocery store in Binghamton. Libous graduated from Broome Community College in 1973 and from the State University of New York at Utica in 1975, where he earned a Bachelor of Science in Marketing and Finance with honors. He worked on political campaigns for his uncle, Alfred Libous, who served as Mayor of Binghamton.

Libous, a Republican, was elected to the Binghamton City Council in 1983 and won re-election in 1987.

== New York State Senate ==
After having served on the Binghamton City Council, Libous was first elected to the New York State Senate in 1988. He succeeded Senator Warren M. Anderson, who had served as senate majority leader. Libous represented Senate District 52, which included Broome, Tioga, Chenango, and Delaware Counties. He was re-elected 13 times. Libous was a powerful presence in Albany, and was known for his advocacy for New York's Southern Tier. He was also known for his ability to work with members of both parties and for his strong working relationship with Democratic Gov. Andrew Cuomo.

In 2008, Libous rose to the position of deputy majority leader. In 2009, after the Republicans lost their Senate majority in the 2008 elections, Libous became the deputy minority leader; he also became chair of the Senate Republican Campaign Committee, helping the Republicans retake the Senate majority the following year. Also in 2009, Libous played a major role in a parliamentary coup when Republicans temporarily took control of the Senate with the help of two dissident Democrats. He was diagnosed with prostate cancer in 2009. Libous was once again named the deputy majority leader of the Senate in 2010.

Libous voted against the legalization of same-sex marriage in New York; nevertheless, the Marriage Equality Act narrowly passed the Senate in June 2011 by a vote of 33-29 and was signed into law. In 2012, Libous was named the Senate's deputy majority coalition leader. Libous voted against the 2013 gun control law known as the New York SAFE Act. He was an outspoken supporter of hydrofracking.

In November 2014, despite having been indicted earlier in the year, Libous was re-elected for a fourteenth Senate term and remained Deputy Majority Leader. He forfeited his Senate seat when he was found guilty of lying to the FBI on July 22, 2015.

=== Community projects and programs ===
Libous helped provide funding for an ice rink at Broome Community College and an events center at Binghamton University. He also supported the Ottawa Senators' American Hockey League affiliate's 2002 move to Binghamton, facilitating the provision of funding for arena renovations on multiple occasions.

In 1998, Libous founded the Student Community Service Awards (SCSA) through a partnership with WBNG-TV and Broome-Tioga BOCES. Each year, the SCSA program awarded scholarships to high school seniors based on community volunteer work.

One of Libous's final acts as Senator was to secure over $4 million in grant funds to construct the new shared office for the Broome County Industrial Development Agency, Broome County Chamber of Commerce, and related groups.

== Legal issues ==
In 2012, Libous was highlighted in a corruption trial for his role in attempting to help his son, Matthew, receive a job at Santangelo, Randazzo & Mangone, a law firm in Westchester County. As a result, an investigation was started, and on July 1, 2014, he was indicted on charges of lying to the FBI regarding the circumstances of his son's employment at the law firm.

Matthew Libous was charged with six counts of tax fraud in a related investigation. In January 2015, Matthew Libous was convicted on three counts of federal tax fraud by judge Vincent L. Briccetti of the Southern District of New York in a bench trial, and in May 2015 he was sentenced to six months in prison.

Thomas Libous was tried in July 2015. On July 22, 2015, after approximately six hours of jury deliberations, Libous was convicted of one count of lying to the F.B.I.; because of the felony conviction, he forfeited his Senate seat. On November 24, 2015, U.S. District Judge Vincent Briccetti sentenced him to six months of house arrest, two years of probation and a $50,000 fine. Libous was not sentenced to jail time due to his terminal cancer. Libous appealed the conviction. On May 30, 2017, the U.S. Court of Appeals for the Second Circuit vacated his conviction and ordered the return of the fine to his estate because Libous had been appealing the conviction at the time of his death.

== Personal life ==
Libous lived in Binghamton with his wife, Frances, who served as Vice Chair of the Workers Compensation Board. The couple had two sons, Matthew and Nicholas.

In 2009, Libous was diagnosed with terminal prostate cancer. He underwent treatment while still serving in the State Senate. In 2010, he founded "I Turned Pro" to encourage men over age 50 to talk to their doctors about the risks of prostate cancer.

Libous died of cancer at a hospice facility in Endicott, New York, on May 3, 2016. His uncle, former Binghamton Mayor Al Libous, died in June 2016 at the age of 88.

New York State Senate
Preceded by Warren M. Anderson	New York State Senate; 51st district 1989–2002	Succeeded by James L. Seward
Preceded by Randy Kuhl	New York State Senate; 52nd district 2003–2015	Succeeded by Fred Akshar
