= David Swarts =

American politician

David J. Swarts

Commissioner of the New York State Department of Motor Vehicles
- In office January 1, 2007 – January 13, 2011
- Governor: Eliot Spitzer; David Paterson
- Succeeded by: Barbara J. Fiala

7th County Clerk of Erie County
- In office January 1, 1987 – December 31, 2006
- Preceded by: Genevieve Starościak
- Succeeded by: Kathy Hochul

Personal details
- Born: David J. Swarts; March 13, 1947 (age 79)
- Party: Democratic

David J. Swarts (born March 13, 1947) was the commissioner of the New York State Department of Motor Vehicles, in the Cabinet of Governor David Paterson. He was appointed to this position by former Governor Eliot Spitzer on December 21, 2006 and took office on Jan. 1, 2007, when the Spitzer Administration took office. He continued in the Paterson Administration after Spitzer resigned from office amid a sex scandal on March 17, 2008.

On January 13, 2011, the Buffalo and Erie County Botanical Gardens Society Inc. announced that Swarts would serve as the new president/chief executive officer. He would be responsible for administering and overseeing daily operations. In addition, he implemented the Strategic Plan. His annual salary was $89,000 in this role.

Swarts is a former County Clerk of Erie County, New York, a position he held for 20 years. He was first elected County Clerk in 1986. He was the unsuccessful Democratic Nominee for Erie County Executive in 1983 and unsuccessfully sought the Democratic nomination for Erie County Executive in 1995. In 1988, he unsuccessfully ran for the U.S. House of Representatives. As County Clerk, he was in charge of receiving court filings, recording and preserving land transactions, issuing passports, overseeing the distribution of various permits and serving as the county's motor vehicle agent. As the county's motor vehicle agent, Swarts administered all DMV activities in Erie County on behalf of the Department of Motor Vehicles. While County Clerk, Swarts focused attention on the ending of tolls on highways surrounding Buffalo, New York.

In September 2007, Swarts and Spitzer developed a plan to issue driver's licenses to illegal immigrants. The plan was the subject of much debate on the state and national levels, and was ultimately scrapped.

Political offices
Preceded by Genevieve "Jane" Starosciak	County Clerk of Erie County, New York; January 1, 1987 – December 31, 2006	Succeeded by Kathleen C. Hochul
Government offices
Preceded by Nancy A. Naples	New York State Commissioner of Motor Vehicles; January 1, 2007 – December 31, 2010	Succeeded by Barbara J. Fiala
