= Nancy Naples (politician) =

American government official

Nancy A. Naples is an American government official and former investment banker. Naples was formerly Commissioner of Motor Vehicles in New York; she was appointed State Motor Vehicles Commissioner by then-Governor George Pataki in January 2006 following a 12-year political career in Western New York. She served as a Cabinet member for the final year of Pataki's term. Naples was also formerly a member of the Board of Directors of Amtrak.

Naples was elected in 1993, 1997, and 2001 as County Comptroller of Erie County, New York. In 2004, she ran for Congress, narrowly losing to then-Democratic Assemblyman Brian Higgins by less than 2% for the right to succeed Republican Jack Quinn.

Naples had a twenty-year career on Wall Street, working at HSBC, Merrill Lynch, and Chemical Bank, and in her family's insurance company in Buffalo, before running for office. In 1998, it was reported that Pataki considered her as a running mate for lieutenant governor. In her capacity as Motor Vehicles Commissioner, Naples served as the Chairwoman of the Governor's Traffic Safety Committee.

In late 2007, President George W. Bush nominated Naples to the Board of Directors of the National Passenger Railroad Corporation (Amtrak). She was confirmed by the U.S. Senate in March 2008 for a five-year term.

Political offices
Preceded by Alfreda W. Slominski	County Comptroller of Erie County, New York; January 1, 1994 – December 31, 2005	Succeeded by James M. Hartmann
Government offices
Preceded by Raymond P. Martinez	New York State Commissioner of Motor Vehicles; 2006–2007	Succeeded by David J. Swarts
