= Priscilla Walker Locke =

- Born: November 28, 1956 (age 69); Detroit, Michigan
- Education: 1980 - West Point (USMA) Central Michigan University - M.A.
- Spouse: Mike Locke
- Military career
- Air Defense Artillery: United States Army
- Service years: 1974-1995
- Rank: Major (promotable)
- Known for: First female African-American graduate of West Point

Priscilla Marie Walker Locke was the first African-American woman to graduate from the United States Military Academy at West Point.

== Early life ==
Priscilla Locke was born in Detroit, Michigan on 28 November 1956. She grew up living with her mother and grandmother. She was seven years old during the Detroit Race Riots of 1967 and was impressed by the paratroopers of the 82nd Airborne Division who patrolled her neighborhood.

== Military career ==
The former enlisted soldier began her army career at age 17 in 1974 at Fort Jackson, South Carolina for basic training. At Fort Polk, Louisiana she became a communications specialist. She first attended the U.S. Military Preparatory School (USMAPS) at Fort Monmouth, New Jersey. She entered West Point in 1976 as a part of the historic Class of 1980, the first class to contain female cadets. At West Point she joined the gymnastics team and became co-captain.

After graduating West Point, Locke became an Air Defense Artillery officer and was sent to Fort Bliss, Texas. At Fort Bliss, she would meet her eventual husband, Mike Locke an army officer. She would earn a master's degree in administration from Central Michigan University. She would later serve in the army's Human Resource Command and on the army staff at the Pentagon.

Major Locke's military career ended due to a spinal injury sustained during training in 1983, leading to her medical retirement in 1995 with 100 percent disability.

== Post military career ==
Locke founded and became the CEO of the Seeds of Humanity Foundation which runs a fitness center for cadet candidates and runs SAT/ACT prep, physical training, and military readiness sessions for up to 37 weeks per year. She became a member of the Defense Advisory Committee On Women In The Service (DACOWITS) in 2017. She was inducted into the Michigan Military and Veterans Hall of Honor in October 2025. She is a recipient of the Golden Torch Award from the National Society of Black Engineers (NSBE).
