= Eliot Spitzer drivers license controversy =

2007 political controversy in New York

In 2007, New York Governor Eliot Spitzer took executive action to allow unauthorized immigrants to be issued driver's licenses. Following widespread opposition, Spitzer later rescinded his executive action before it took effect.

== History ==
On September 21, 2007, Spitzer issued an executive order directing that state offices allow illegal immigrants to be issued driver's licenses. The order was scheduled to go into effect in December 2007. Spitzer's policy did not require driver license applicants to prove that they were lawful residents of the United States. Also, it allowed applicants to present foreign passports as identification. At that time, eight other states did not require individuals to prove their legal immigration status when applying for a driver's licenses. Spitzer stated that the new policy would improve traffic safety because unlicensed drivers were nearly five times more likely than licensed drivers to be in fatal car crashes. Spitzer also said that the policy would allow unauthorized immigrants to buy auto insurance, which would reduce the number of uninsured drivers in the state and therefore decrease insurance premiums for all New Yorkers by an estimated $120 million.

After meeting with the Department of Homeland Security in October 2007, Spitzer agreed that licenses issued to undocumented immigrants would look different from other licenses and would not allow the holders of such licenses to access airplanes or federal buildings.

A poll conducted by Survey USA on October 3 reported that 56% of New Yorkers opposed the Governor's plan. The Spitzer proposal was met with bipartisan criticism. Critics charged that the plan would open the door for illegal immigrants to obtain official identification and compromise security improvements made since September 11, 2001. His critics included Democratic presidential candidate Senator Christopher Dodd, who denounced the proposal at a debate held on October 30. After a day of equivocation following the debate, Senator Hillary Clinton issued a prepared statement that endorsed the plan. New York City Mayor Michael Bloomberg opposed the executive order, calling it "inappropriate." Minority leader of the State Assembly, James Tedisco, promised a lawsuit to block the proposal.

Thirteen county clerks vowed that they would decline to issue driver licenses to undocumented immigrants if Spitzer's policy were implemented. One such clerk who denounced the proposal was Erie County Clerk Kathy Hochul, who was appointed to serve an interim term in her office by Spitzer. She was elected to serve the remaining three years of the term of her predecessor, state Motor Vehicles Commissioner David Swarts, after vocally breaking with Spitzer. Hochul would later become the first female governor of New York State following the resignation of Governor Andrew Cuomo amid allegations sexual harassment.

Others who opposed the proposal included Democratic Congresswoman Kirsten Gillibrand, Democratic County Executive Steve Levy of Suffolk County, and Long Island Democratic State Senator Craig Johnson. While the issue initially was significant only in New York, cable TV and talk radio made this a national controversy, as one of Spitzer's strongest critics was CNN host Lou Dobbs, who labeled Spitzer an "idiot" for this policy. While opposition to the driver's license proposal emerged from both political parties, Spitzer claimed his opponents were aligned with the "rabid right."

On October 21, 2007, the New York State Senate voted 39-19 to oppose the Spitzer plan. Eight Democrats from moderate districts broke with Spitzer on the vote. After the vote, The New York Times called this issue "Mr. Spitzer’s single most unpopular decision since he took office."

Following the State Senate's vote, Spitzer revised his plan again, proposing the issuance of a third type of driver's license. This driver's license would be available only to United States citizens who were New York State residents, and would be valid for crossing the Canada–US border. Spitzer also announced that the expiration dates of temporary visas would be printed on the driver's licenses of individuals on temporary visas.

By November 13, a poll by Siena College reported that 70% of New Yorkers opposed his plan; furthermore, only 25% would vote to re-elect Spitzer.

On November 14, Spitzer announced he would withdraw the plan to issue driver's licenses to illegal immigrants, acknowledging that it would never be implemented. The decision drew derision from the press, as the Associated Press termed this reversal a "surrender." WCBS-TV labeled him "Governor Flip-Flop." State Senator Rubén Díaz of the Bronx said he was "betrayed" by Spitzer's abandonment of the plan.

== Later developments ==
On June 27, 2019, New York Gov. Andrew Cuomo signed the Green Light Bill into law. The law allowed undocumented immigrants to apply for and obtain driver licenses.
