= Brenda Sue Fulton =

American government official and former military officer

Sue Fulton
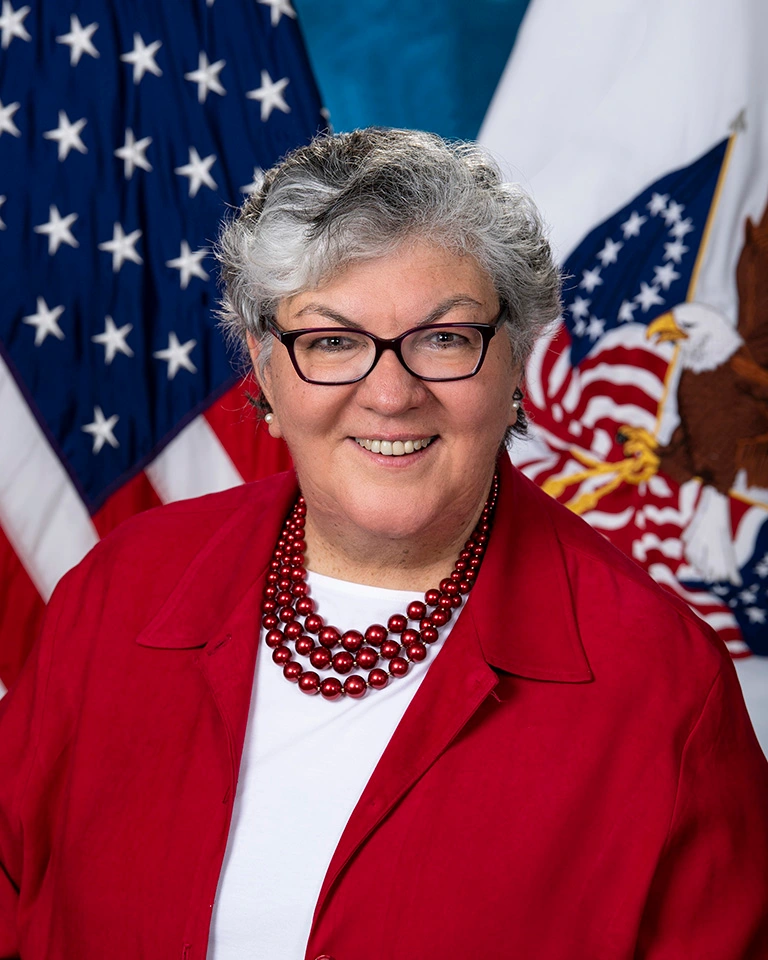
- Fulton in 2022

Assistant Secretary of Veterans Affairs for Public and Intergovernmental Affairs
- In office July 2022 – January 2024
- President: Joe Biden
- Preceded by: Kayla Williams

Chair & Chief Administrator of the New Jersey Motor Vehicle Commission
- In office April 17, 2018 – July 1, 2022
- Governor: Phil Murphy
- Preceded by: Raymond P. Martinez
- Succeeded by: Latrecia Littles-Floyd (acting)

Personal details
- Born: Brenda Sue Fulton
- Party: Democratic
- Education: United States Military Academy (BS)

Brenda Sue Fulton is a former American government official and former military officer who has served as the assistant secretary of veterans affairs for public and intergovernmental affairs in the United States Department of Veterans Affairs. She commissioned in the United States Army as a signal officer, serving as both a platoon leader and company commander in Germany before receiving an honorable discharge at the rank of captain.

== Education ==
Fulton is a 1980 graduate of the United States Military Academy at West Point, a member of the academy's first class to admit women.

== Career ==
=== LGBT Military Activism ===
Fulton worked briefly with the Campaign for Military Service (later SLDN), supporting President Bill Clinton's efforts to overturn the ban on gay service. These efforts failed, leading to the "Don't Ask, Don't Tell" policy.

After the inauguration of President Barack Obama in 2009, Fulton served as a founding board member of Knights Out, an organization of LGBTQ West Point graduates, and later OutServe, the association of actively-serving LGBTQ military members. In those roles, she advocated for repeal of "Don't Ask, Don't Tell," and worked closely with the Pentagon on implementation of the repeal. She is still active in Knights Out. She also served initially as the president of SPARTA, an LGBTQ military group advocating for transgender military service.

Fulton was among the more than 75 USMA women alumni who attended the first Ranger School graduation to include women, calling the moment as important as her classmates' own graduation from West Point.

=== West Point Board of Visitors ===
In 2011, Obama appointed Fulton to the West Point Board of Visitors, making her the first openly gay person to serve as a board member in its history. She spoke as part of a three-person panel at the first-ever LGBT pride event held at the Pentagon, where she discussed her experiences in the Army and at West Point.

In 2013, Fulton openly challenged the academy leadership on its handling of cadet misconduct, specifically related to sexual harassment and assault. Her tenure has been marked by increased diversity in entering classes, with higher percentages of African-American, Latino, and women cadets.

In 2015, Fulton was elected chairperson of the Board of Visitors at West Point, making her the first woman graduate to hold that position.

=== New Jersey Motor Vehicle Commission ===
In February 2018, Governor Phil Murphy of New Jersey appointed Fulton as chair and chief administrator of the Motor Vehicle Commission, and is part of the first majority-female cabinet in New Jersey's history.

Fulton administered the MVC's response to the COVID-19 pandemic. The MVC expanded online services for most transactions. After months of closure due to COVID-19, MVC offices throughout the state were allowed to re-open on July 7, 2020. As the first state agency to fully open to in-person customer service, Fulton instituted strict COVID-19 preventive measures as well as a new text notification system to successfully protect employees and customers.

=== Assistant Secretary of Defense for Manpower and Reserve Affairs ===
Fulton was nominated by President Joe Biden to the office of Assistant Secretary of Defense for Manpower and Reserve Affairs. During her Senate confirmation hearing, she faced opposition from Republican senators over past statements and tweets critical of Republicans and conservative Christians. The position of Assistant Secretary of Defense for Manpower and Reserve Affairs is in charge of oversight of military chaplains and religious accommodations in the military. Those who opposed her nomination expressed concern that the views that she had repeatedly expressed in public would not allow her to be politically and religiously neutral in carrying out her responsibilities if her nomination were confirmed. In June 2022, it was reported that her nomination would be withdrawn by the White House and she would be placed in a senior role at the VA, assistant secretary for public and intergovernmental affairs, which does not require confirmation. The nomination was officially withdrawn on September 29, 2022.

== Personal life ==
In 2012, Fulton and Penelope Dara Gnesin became the first couple to be married in a same-sex marriage at the U.S. Military Academy's Cadet Chapel at West Point (not to be confused with the Old Cadet Chapel). Gnesin died of breast cancer in 2019.
