= Richard E. Jackson =

American politician (1945–2025)

- Jackson in 1995

New York State Commissioner of Motor Vehicles
- In office February 14, 1995 – 2000
- Governor: George Pataki
- Preceded by: Patricia B. Adduci
- Succeeded by: Raymond P. Martinez

Mayor of Peekskill, New York
- In office December 31, 1984 – April 24, 1991
- Preceded by: George Pataki
- Succeeded by: Vincent C. Vesce

Personal details
- Born: Richard Ernest Jackson Jr. July 18, 1945
- Died: August 10, 2025 (aged 80)
- Party: Republican
- Profession: Politician, teacher

Richard Ernest Jackson Jr. (July 18, 1945 – August 10, 2025) was an American politician, civil servant, and educator from New York. A Republican, Jackson has served as New York State Commissioner of Motor Vehicles, Mayor of Peekskill, New York, and as a member of the Peekskill City Council.

He is the first African-American to serve as mayor of a city in the history of New York.

== Early life ==
Jackson was born in Peekskill on July 18, 1945.

== Career ==
Jackson began his career as a mathematics teacher at Peekskill High School. Jackson later taught calculus at Averill Park High School.

A three-term Peekskill City Councilmember, Jackson was appointed Mayor of Peekskill in December 1984 by a unanimous vote of the City Council when the previous mayor, George Pataki, stepped down to serve in the New York State Assembly. Upon assuming office, he became the first African-American Mayor of Peekskill. According to The New York Times, Jackson was also the first African-American mayor of a city in the State of New York. (Note: Although The New York Times has referred to Jackson as the first African-American mayor of a city in New York history, Jackson was not the first African-American mayor in New York history. The Villages of Cleveland, Port Byron, and Bridgewater, respectively, had African-American chief executives before Jackson became Mayor of Peekskill. Ben White, an African-American, was elected Mayor of the Cayuga County Village of Port Byron on March 16, 1971. Everett T. Holmes, also an African-American, served as Mayor of the Oneida County Village of Bridgewater from 1974 to 1976 and from 1978 until 1982. Also, Ronald Blackwood, an African-American man from Mount Vernon, New York, became Acting Mayor of that city in 1976. According to The New York History Blog and the Cleveland Historical Society, the Oswego County Village of Cleveland elected an African-American man named Edward "Ned" Sherman to the position of village president in May 1878.) A Republican, Jackson won a full term as mayor in 1985; he later won re-election to two successive terms with the largest pluralities in the city's 51-year history. He continued to teach mathematics at Peekskill High School while serving in his part-time mayoral post. Jackson stepped down on April 24, 1991.

In 1995, then-Governor Pataki appointed Jackson to the post of New York State Commissioner of Motor Vehicles. Jackson served as Commissioner from 1995 to 2000.

== See also ==
- List of first African-American mayors

== Notes ==
Political offices
Preceded by George Pataki	Mayor of Peekskill, New York; 1985 – 1991	Succeeded by Vincent C. Vesce
Government offices
Preceded by Patricia B. Adduci	New York State Commissioner of Motor Vehicles; February 14, 1995 – 2000	Succeeded by Raymond P. Martinez
