= United States Service Academies Class of 1980 =

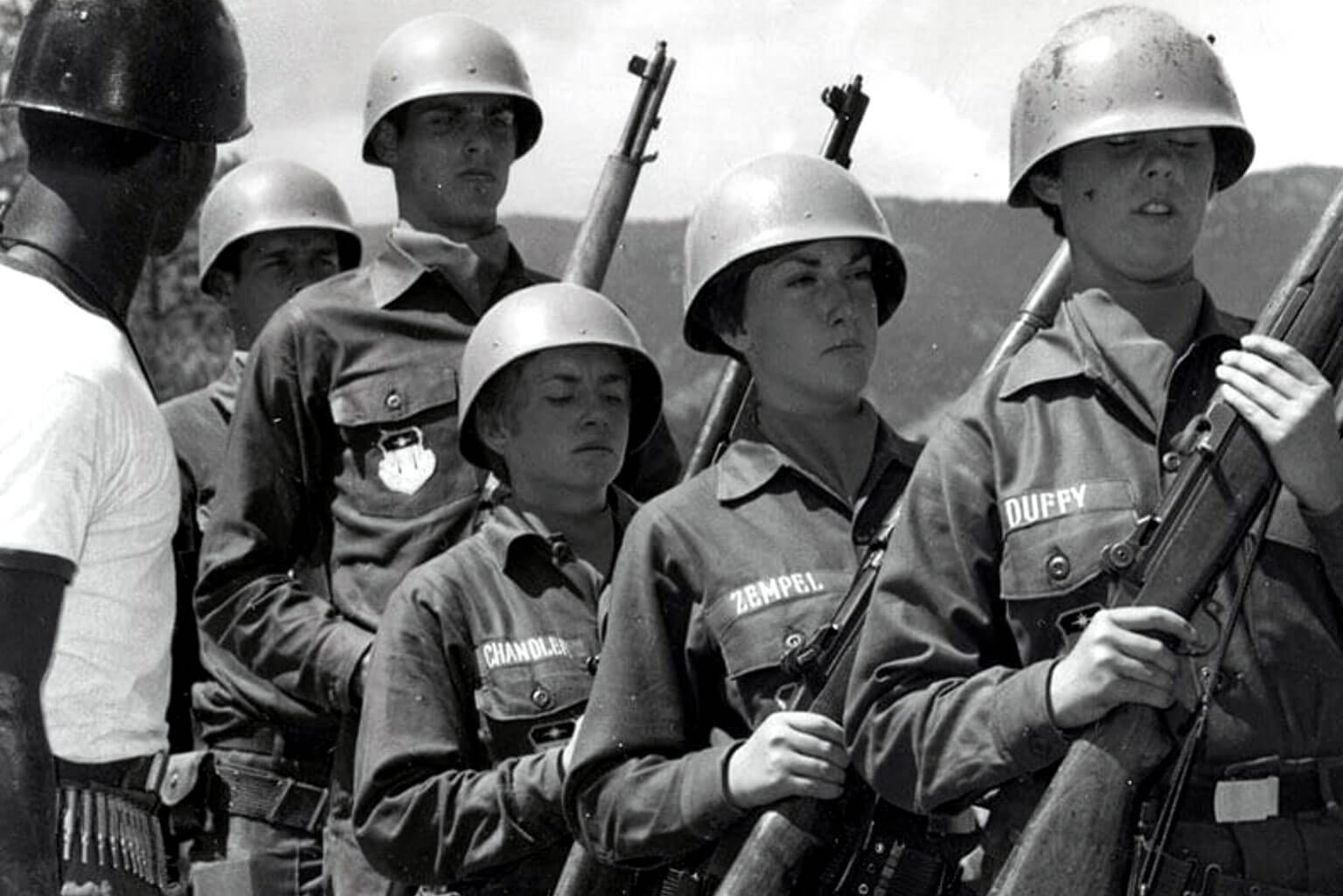
The U.S. Air Force Academy’s first female cadets train in 1976. (U.S. Air Force photo)

The United States Service Academies Class of 1980 was the first graduating class at the various United States military service academies (West Point, Annapolis, Air Force Academy, Coast Guard Academy) that contained female cadets as members. The U.S. Merchant Marine Academy had admitted its first females for the Class of 1978 even though they were exempt from Title IX legislation.

== History ==
Congress passed and on 7 October 1975, president Gerald Ford signed PUBLIC LAW 94-106 authorizing "the orderly and expeditious admission of women to the academies." The first female cadets would begin training at the academies in 1976.

Women had served in the military, outside of nurses, since 15 May 1942 when the Women's Army Auxiliary Corps was created by the Army. Later, each service would have a women's auxiliary force (WAVES, SPARS, WACs, USMCWR and WASPs) during World War II.

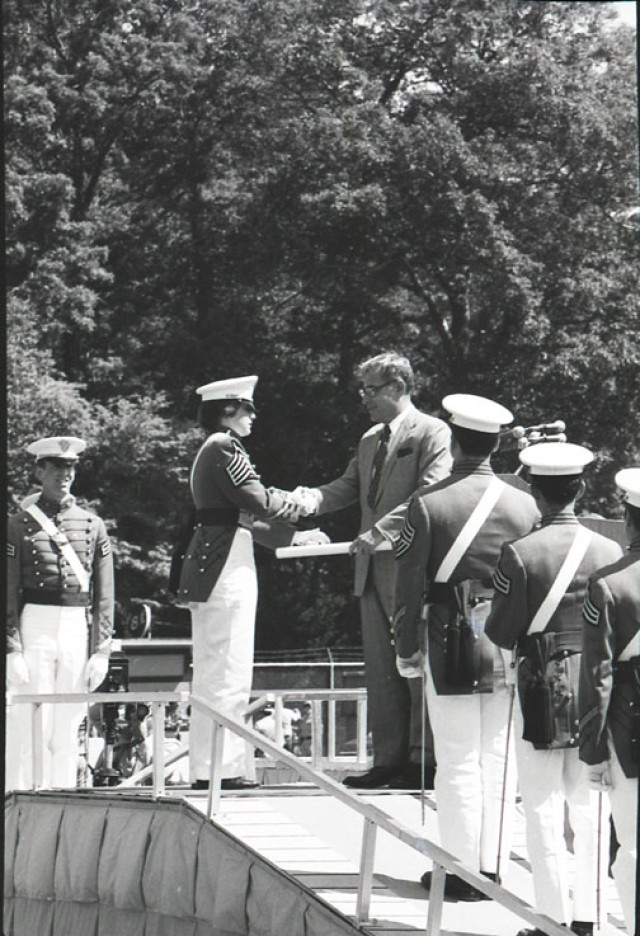
USMA 1980 Cadet Graduation first female cadets.

== Reaction ==
There was resistance from the military at the highest levels. Secretary of the Navy, J. William Middendorf, stated his determination not to accept women at Annapolis (the Naval Academy) and General William Westmoreland said it would be “silly” to permit women to enroll at West Point as its purpose was to train combat officers. The Air Force Academy was the only academy to assign female officers for training, and went so far as to issue a press release one day after president Ford signed the new law. One male cadet reportedly said in a media interview that they didn't want women at the academy (West Point). Even Assistant Chief of Naval Personnel for Women, Captain Robin L. Quigley, testified before Congress against allowing women into the Naval Academy.

== Integration ==
Facilities at the academies had to be changed including toilets, haircuts and new dress uniforms designed specifically for women that often had a lot of problems when actually worn. At West Point, women would take karate and not boxing and be given smaller, lighter rifles for drill. At the Air Force Academy, female cadets all lived in Vandenberg Tower together until they returned from Winter Break and were finally integrated into the cadet squadrons.

At the Air Force Academy, the cadets entered their first day under the "Bring Me Men" ramp, which would not be changed to the Academy Core Values ramp until 2004.

Project 60A was created at West Point before the first female cadets came., They recruited volunteer high school girls to determine how women will handle ruck marches, physical fitness (PT) and other challenges. The results surprised the academy - women had a higher level of physical ability than previously believed, including higher levels of lower body strength. West Point still decided to substitute flexed-arm hangs for pull-ups and banned women from contact sports such as football and wrestling.

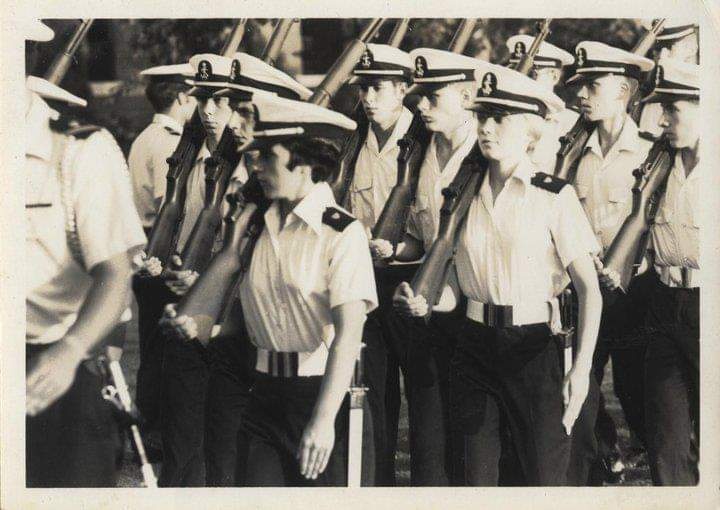
Cadets Robin Gallagher and Tricia Edman marching in formation on the parade grounds. (U.S. Coast Guard Photo)

Female cadets experienced harassment from male cadets and were expelled if found to be pregnant, except at the USAFA. At the Merchant Marine Academy if a female and male cadet were found together in bed, the female cadet was expelled but not the male cadet. At the Naval Academy, upperclassmen refused to share helpful information or even be friendly towards the new female cadets.

== Combat prohibition ==
At the Air Force Academy (USAFA), women could not train to become fighter pilots as combat roles were forbidden to women under the new law. At West Point, female cadets will be permitted to request "combat related" assignments such as air defense and field artillery. At the Naval Academy, women could not become Marine Corps aviators and opportunities as line officers were nonexistent until 1987.

== Media attention ==
The female cadets received intense media attention throughout their four years, including CBS News' Walter Cronkite reporting on their graduation ceremonies. The cadets tired of the intrusion on their training and school work as well as being misrepresented by reporters. At the Air Force Academy there were 47 media outlets on induction day, including national and international television.

== Graduation ==
The first class at West Point contained 119 cadets and graduated 62. The Naval Academy graduated 55 (out of 81) female cadets, Air Force 97 (out of 157) and the Coast Guard 14 (out of 38) in 1980. The Merchant Marine Academy's Class of 1978 graduated 8 of the 15 who began. Air Force Academy, West Point female cadets reported a higher dropout rate than their male peers in 1980, while the Naval Academy was only about 30 percent.

== Notable members ==
U.S. Air Force Academy

- Gen. Janet Wolfenbarger - first female four star general in the U.S. Air Force
- Lt. Gen. Susan Helms - NASA astronaut on five space shuttle missions

U.S. Coast Guard Academy

- Capt. Jean M. Butler - Executive Assistant to the Chief of Human Resources, USCG
- Capt. Christine J. Quedens - first branch chief of the Future Operations and Planning branch, USCG

U.S. Military Academy at West Point

- Brenda Sue Fulton - Assistant Secretary of Veterans Affairs for Public and Intergovernmental Affairs
- Col. Debra Lewis - Commander Central District, Gulf Region Division (GRD) U.S. Army Corps of Engineers
- Maj. Priscilla Walker Locke - first African American woman to graduate from West Point
- Capt. Danna Maller Rocque - first Jewish American woman to graduate from West Point

U.S. Naval Academy

- Sharon Hanley Disher - author

== See also ==
- Golden Thirteen - first African American commissioned officers in the U.S. Navy
