= New York State Department of Motor Vehicles =

Agency in the U.S. state of New York

Department of Motor Vehicles
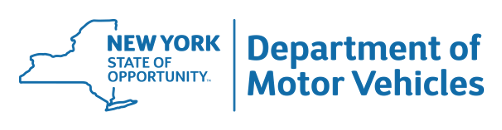
- New York State Department of Motor Vehicles

Department overview
- Jurisdiction: New York
- Headquarters: 6 Empire State Plaza, Albany, New York 12220
- Department executives: Mark J.F. Schroeder, Commissioner; Theresa L. Egan, Executive Deputy Commissioner
- Key document: Vehicle and Traffic Law
- Website: dmv.ny.gov

The New York State Department of Motor Vehicles (NYSDMV or DMV) is the department of the New York state government responsible for vehicle registration, vehicle inspections, driver's licenses, learner's permits, photo ID cards, and adjudicating traffic violations. Its regulations are compiled in title 15 of the New York Codes, Rules and Regulations.

== Administrative courts ==
The Traffic Violations Bureau (TVB) is an administrative court that adjudicates non-criminal traffic violations (other than parking violations) in New York City.

== Division of Field Investigation ==
The Division of Field Investigation (DFI) is the criminal investigations arm of the DMV. Its investigators/law enforcement officers combat auto theft, identity theft, and fraudulent document related crimes in New York. These investigators are armed New York State peace officers with state wide authority to enforce laws and handle investigations. Motor Vehicle Investigators also perform fraud detection, investigate auto theft rings. Motor Vehicle Investigator's perform a variety of criminal investigations, field inspections, inventories of seized properties, odometer fraud, identity verification, fraudulent document detection, vehicle theft examinations.

== Registration ==
The New York State Vehicle and Traffic Law gives DMV the authority to suspend registrations for habitual and persistent violations of the law. In 2015-2016, the DMV enacted regulations allowing the suspensions of registration for people who fail to pay 5 road charge fines (toll violations) within 18 months.

== Real ID Act ==
In order to travel on U.S. domestic flights or enter federal buildings, by May 3, 2023, state residents must possess a Real ID Act compliant identification card. The New York DMV is encouraging residents to arrange to upgrade their ID ahead of the deadline at the cost of a replacement ID. Currently, the fee to apply for or renew a REAL ID is the same as the fee for a standard New York State DMV license. State residents who are United States citizens can also apply for an Enhanced ID, which allows them to cross the border from Canada or Mexico, as well as some Caribbean countries, for an additional $30 fee. Under the Real ID Act, people applying for a Real ID compliant license must provide additional proof of their identity and residence. New Yorkers must apply for a REAL ID or Enhanced license by going into a DMV office and presenting the necessary documentation, even if they currently have a non-upgraded license. They may not apply online or by mail. The DMV has created a "Document Guide", a tool on its website that will tell people what documents they need to apply for a Real ID or Enhanced ID.

== List of commissioners ==
- Charles A. Harnett 1924–1938
- Carroll E. Mealey 1938–1942
- John Splain 1942–1943
- Clifford J. Fletcher 1943–1951
- James R. Macduff 1952–1955
- Joseph P. Kelly 1955–1959
- William S. Hults Jr. 1959–December 31, 1966
- Vincent L. Tofany January 1, 1967–1973
- James Melton 1975–1981
- Leslie G. Foschio 1981-1983
- Patricia B. Adduci
- John Passidomo
- Richard E. Jackson 1995–2000
- Raymond P. Martinez 2000–2005
- Nancy Naples 2006–2007
- David Swarts 2007–2010
- Barbara Fiala 2011–2014

Vacant 2014–2019

- Mark J.F. Schroeder 2019–present

== See also ==
- Vehicle registration plates of New York
