= Vehicle registration plates of New Jersey =

New Jersey vehicle license plates

New Jersey
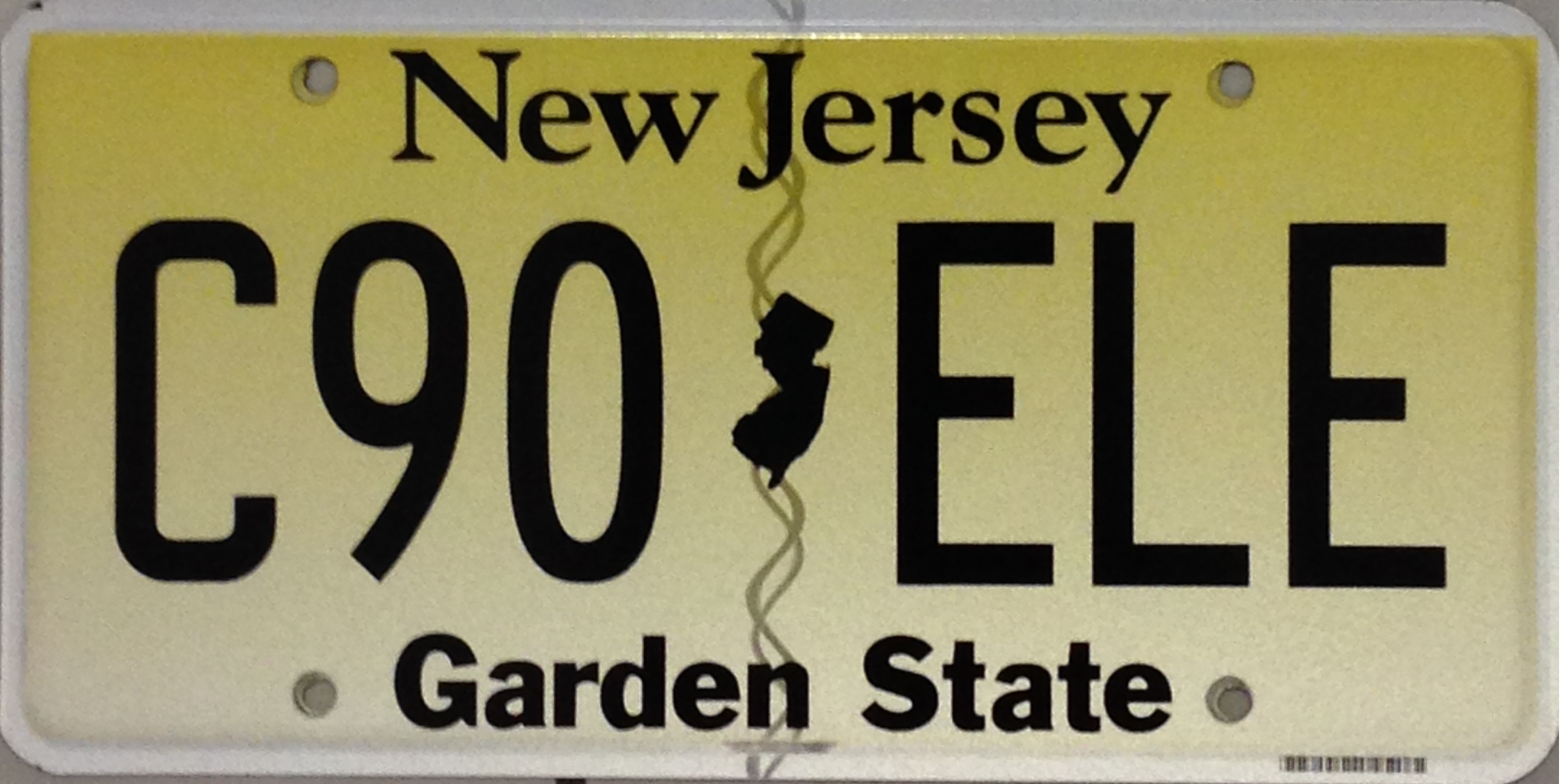
- Current Garden State plate, with screened serial

Current series
- Slogan: Garden State
- Size: 12 in × 6 in 30 cm × 15 cm
- Material: Aluminum
- Serial format: A12-BCD
- Introduced: 1992 (current version introduced April 2014)

Availability
- Issued by: New Jersey Motor Vehicle Commission

History
- First issued: June 1, 1908 (pre-state plates from 1903 through May 31, 1908)

The U.S. state of New Jersey first required its residents to register their motor vehicles in 1903. Registrants provided their own license plates for display until 1908, when the state began to issue plates.

As of 2026, plates are issued by the New Jersey Motor Vehicle Commission. Front and rear plates are required for most classes of vehicles, while only rear plates are required for motorcycles and trailers.

== Validation ==
In 1999 the state tried re-validating plates with stickers, but that scheme ended in 2004 with stickers issued to expire in 2005. Some non-passenger plates stickers extended to 2010 with stickers issued to expire in 2011 (2014 for trailer plates only). Since then passenger and non-passenger plates have been re-validated with just the registration card issued to the driver.

== Passenger baseplates ==
=== 1908 to 1958 ===
In 1956, the United States, Canada, and Mexico came to an agreement with the American Association of Motor Vehicle Administrators, the Automobile Manufacturers Association and the National Safety Council that standardized the size for license plates for vehicles (except those for motorcycles) at 6 inches (15 cm) in height by 12 inches (30 cm) in width, with standardized mounting holes. The first New Jersey license plate that complied with these standards was a modification of the 1952 plate, introduced in 1956.

No slogans were used on passenger plates during the period covered by this subsection.

Image	First issued	Design	Serial format	Serials issued	Notes
	1908	Cream-colored serial digits on individual dark blue flat metal panels inserted into metal frame; "N.J.", lead seal and "08" on single panel inserted at right	12345	38001 to approximately 50500, plus reissues of pre-state serials	
	1909	White serial on black porcelain plate; "N.J", aluminum seal and "09" at right	12345	1 to approximately 24000	
	1910	Black serial on bright orange porcelain plate; "N.J", aluminum seal and "10" at left	12345	1 to approximately 30000	
	1911	Red serial on gray porcelain plate; "N.J", aluminum seal and "11" at right	12345	1 to approximately 38000	
	1912	Yellow serial on blue porcelain plate; "N.J", aluminum seal and "12" at left	12345	1 to approximately 44000	
	1913	Red serial on white porcelain plate; "N.J", aluminum seal and "13" at right	12345	1 to approximately 50000	
	1914	White serial on red porcelain plate; "N.J", aluminum seal and "14" at left	12345	1 to approximately 61000	
	1915	White serial on green porcelain plate; "N.J", aluminum seal and "15" at right	12345	1 to approximately 78000	
	1916	Embossed white serial on brown plate; "NJ 16" at left	12345	1 to 99999	
	1916	Embossed white serial on brown plate; "NJ 16" at left	A1234	A1 to approximately A6800	
	1917	Embossed white serial on blue plate; "NJ 17" at right	12345	1 to 99999	
	1917	Embossed white serial on blue plate; "NJ 17" at right	A1234	A, B, N and O series; X1 to approximately X1900	
	1918	Embossed blue serial on white plate; "N.J.-1918" centered at top	123456	1 to approximately 149500	
	1919	Embossed white serial on gray plate; "N.J.−1919" centered at top	123456	1 to approximately 175500	
Photograph of a surviving 1920 license plate	1920	Embossed white serial on brick red plate; "N.J.−1920" centered at top	123456	1 to approximately 212500	
	1921	Embossed white serial on forest green plate; "N.J.−1921" centered at top	123456	1 to approximately 247500	
	1922	Embossed white serial on black plate; "N.J.−1922" centered at top	123456	1 to approximately 258500	
	1923	Embossed orange serial on black plate; "N.J.—23" centered at top	123456	1 to approximately 331500	
1924 New Jersey Vehicle Registration Plate	1924	Embossed white serial on red plate; "N.J.−1924" centered at top	123456	1 to approximately 400000	
	1925	Embossed silver serial on midnight blue plate; "N.J.—25" centered at top	123456	1 to approximately 460500	
	1926	Embossed white serial on orange plate; "N.J.−1926" centered at top	A12345; 1E2345	County-coded	Essex County used E in the second position following E99999; this practice continued through 1930.
	1927	Embossed white serial on green plate; "N.J.−27." centered at top	A12345; 1E2345; O/N12345	County-coded	Serifs added to letters in serials for better readability. O/N code replaced Q code in Ocean County.
	1928	Embossed white serial on light blue plate; "N.J.−1928" centered at top	A12345; 1E2345; O/N12345	County-coded	
	1929	Embossed white serial on black plate; "N.J.−29." centered at top	A12345; 1E2345; O/N12345	County-coded	
	1930	Embossed white serial on gray plate; "N.J.−1930" centered at top	A12345; 1E2345; O/N12345	County-coded	
	1931	Embossed white serial on red plate; "N.J.−31." centered at top	A12345; 1/E12345; O/N12345	County-coded	1/E1001 onwards issued in Essex County following E99999; this practice continued through 1938.
	1932	Embossed white serial on black plate; "N.J.−1932." centered at top	A12345; 1/E12345; O/N12345	County-coded	
	1933	Embossed orange serial on black plate; "N.J.−'33." centered at top	A12345; 1/E12345; O/N12345	County-coded	
	1934	Embossed light green serial on black plate; "N.J.−1934" centered at top	A12345; 1/E12345; O/N12345	County-coded	
	1935	Embossed silver serial on black plate; "N.J.−'35." centered at top	A12345; 1/E12345; O/N12345	County-coded	
	1936	Embossed bright orange serial on black plate; "N.J.−1936" centered at top	A12345; 1/E12345; O/N12345	County-coded	
	1937	Embossed light green serial on black plate; "N.J.−'37." centered at top	A12345; 1/E12345; O/N12345	County-coded	
	1938	Embossed silver serial on black plate; "N.J.−1938" centered at top	A12345; 1/B1234; 1/E12345; O/N12345	County-coded	1/B1001 onwards issued in Bergen County following B99999.
	1939	Embossed bright orange serial on black plate; vertical "NJ 39" at right	A/B123; A/B12A	County-coded (A/B)	For each two-letter code, the numbers 100 to 999 were issued, followed by 10A through 99Z (omitting G, I, O and Q).
	1940	Embossed light green serial on black plate; vertical "NJ 40" at right	A/B123; A/B12A	County-coded (A/B)	
	1941	Embossed white serial on black plate; "N.J. '41" roughly centered at bottom	A/B123; A/B12A	County-coded (A/B)	
	1942	Embossed yellow serial on black plate; "N.J. 1942" roughly centered at bottom	A/B123; A/B12A	County-coded (A/B)	Revalidated for 1943 with white-on-black tabs, due to metal conservation for World War II.
	1944	Embossed black serial on straw-colored plate; "N.J. '44" roughly centered at bottom	A/B123; A/B12A	County-coded (A/B)	Only rear plates issued due to ongoing metal conservation. Issuance of front plates resumed in 1947.
	1945	Embossed blue serial on straw-colored plate; "N.J. 1945" at bottom, offset to right	A/B123; A/B12A	County-coded (A/B)	
	1946	Embossed black serial on straw-colored plate; "N.J. '46" centered at top	A/B123; A/B12A	County-coded (A/B)	
	1947	Embossed blue serial on straw-colored plate; "N.J. 1947" at bottom, offset to right	A/B123; A/B12A	County-coded (A/B)	
	1948	Embossed black serial on straw-colored plate; "N.J. '48" centered at top	A/B123; A/B12A	County-coded (A/B)	
	1949	Embossed straw-colored serial on black plate; "N.J. 1949" at bottom, offset to right	A/B123; A/B12A	County-coded (A/B)	
	1950	As 1948 base, but with "N.J. '50" at top	A/B123; A/B12A	County-coded (A/B)	
	1951	As 1949 base, but with "N.J. 1951" at bottom	A/B123; A/B12A	County-coded (A/B)	
	1952	Embossed orange lettering on black plate with border line; "N. 52 J." embossed at bottom.	A/B 123; A/B 12A; A/B A12; A/B 1A2; A/B 1234	Coded by county (A/B)	Revalidated for 1953, 1954 (shown in photo), 1955 and 1956 (also shown in photo) with tabs (Passenger) 1957, 1958, 1959, and 1960 with tabs (Non-Passenger).
	1957	As above but changed to 6" x 12" size, and with stacked "NJ" embossed at right	A/B 1234	Coded by county (A/B)	Revalidated for 1958 with windshield stickers. The older 1952 plates (by now dated "56") were also validated with windshield stickers.

=== 1959 to present ===
All passenger plates from 1959 until present are still valid, provided they have been continuously registered. It is also possible to have a serial from an older plate remade on a plate of a newer design.

Image	First issued	Design	Slogan	Serial format	Serials issued	Notes
	1959	Embossed black serial on non-reflective buff plate; "N.J." centered at top	"GARDEN STATE" centered at bottom	ABC-123	AAA-100 to RHZ-999	Letter Q not used in serials, and 'D', 'O', 'T' and 'X' series reserved for Dealer, Omnibus, Trailer and Commercial plates respectively. This practice continued until late 1992.
	1969	As above, but reflective	"GARDEN STATE" centered at bottom	ABC-123	RIA-100 to SZZ-999	Experimental plates.
	1970	As above, but non-reflective as from 1959 to 1969	"GARDEN STATE" centered at bottom	ABC-123	UAA-100 to YZZ-999	'Z' series initially reserved for Commercial plates; issued 1985 on blue base (below).
	1973	As above, but non-reflective as from 1959 to 1969	"GARDEN STATE" centered at bottom	123-ABC	100-AAA to 999-HBZ	
	1977	As above, but with "NEW JERSEY" centered at top	"GARDEN STATE" centered at bottom	123-ABC	100-HCA to 999-KZZ	First use of the full state name on passenger plates.
	1979	Embossed buff serial with state-shaped separator on non-reflective medium blue plate; "NEW JERSEY" centered at top	"GARDEN STATE" centered at bottom	123-ABC	100-LAA to 999-ZZZ	
	1985	Embossed buff serial with state-shaped separator on non-reflective medium blue plate; "NEW JERSEY" centered at top	"GARDEN STATE" centered at bottom	ABC-123	ZAA-100 to ZZZ-999	
	1985	Embossed buff serial with state-shaped separator on non-reflective medium blue plate; "NEW JERSEY" centered at top	"GARDEN STATE" centered at bottom	ABC-12D	AAA-10A to HZZ-99Z	I and O not used as suffix letters in this serial format (in addition to Q).
	late 1992	Embossed black serial on reflective yellow to gradient white plate; "New Jersey" screened in black centered at top; black outlines for registration stickers at top corners	"Garden State" screened in black centered at bottom	ABC1234	AAA1000 to ADJ9999	Letters I, O and Q not used in serials; this practice continues today.
	spring 1993	As above, but with state-shaped separator added to serial	"Garden State" screened in black centered at bottom	AB-123C	BA-100A to ZY-999Z	'D', 'H', 'T' and 'X' series reserved for Dealer, Handicapped, Trailer and Commercial plates respectively, and 'S' series for optional Shore to Please plate. 'A' series used on Apportioned plates from 1996 onwards.
	May 1999	As above, but with state-shaped separator added to serial	"Garden State" screened in black centered at bottom	ABC-12D	JAA-10A to SZZ-99Z; UAA-10A to VZT-99Z	'T' series reserved for Trailer plates. Between 2001 and 2004, plates used Avery reflective sheeting instead of 3M reflective sheeting.
	mid 2007	As above, but without black outlines at top corners	"Garden State" screened in black centered at bottom	ABC-12D	VZU-10A to WZZ-99Z; YAA-10A to ZZZ-99Z	'X' series reserved for Commercial and Farmer plates.
	July 2010	As above, but with security threads added to center of plate	"Garden State" screened in black centered at bottom	A12-BCD	A10-AAA to T99-EEK	In this format, the prefix letter progresses before the suffix letters. For example, A99-AAA was followed by B10-AAA; and Z99-AAA was followed by A10-AAB.
	April 2014	As above, but with serial and separator screened rather than embossed	"Garden State" screened in black centered at bottom	A12-BCD	A10-EFF to Z99-SZZ; A10-UAA to Z99-WZZ; A10-YAA to F67-YRE (as of November 6, 2026	'T' series reserved for Trailer plates. ‘X’ series reserved for Commercial plates.

== Courtesy plates ==
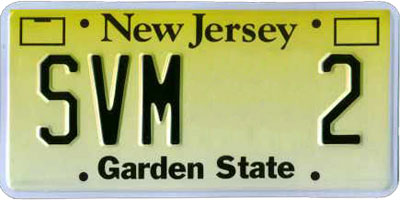
New Jersey courtesy license plate

Courtesy plates have been issued to individuals with political connections since 1920. The current serial formats on these plates consist of three letters followed or preceded by a number between 1 and 20. On standard courtesy plates the first letter is a county code, the second letter is the first initial of the vehicle owner's name, and the third letter is the initial of the last name of the vehicle owner. Courtesy plates may also be personalized, with all three letters making up the owner's initials.

Courtesy plates can be used on several types of vehicles, including cars, motorcycles and historic vehicles. They must be approved by a NJ State Senator from the applicant's election district prior to being submitted to the MVC. The staff for the applicant's senator must also get approval from the state senator from the county that corresponds to the first letter on the plate being requested. The letter Q cannot be used on these plates, and D, O, T, and X cannot be used as the first letter.

=== Courtesy plate county codes 1959 to present ===
Letter	County
A	Atlantic
B	Bergen
C	Camden
E	Essex
F	Ocean
G	Gloucester
H	Hudson
I	Hunterdon
J	Salem
K	Middlesex
L	Morris
M	Monmouth
N	Burlington
P	Passaic
R	Mercer
S	Somerset
U	Union
V	Sussex
W	Warren
Y	Cumberland
Z	Cape May

== Current plate types ==
All bases of all classes of plates from 1959 to present are still valid for display in New Jersey.

=== Non-Passenger ===
Image	Type	First issued	Current serial format	Previous serial formats	Notes
	Ambulance	July 1, 2014	OA-123A	OA-1234	Ambulances used Commercial and No Fee plates prior to July 2014.
	Apportioned	June 1996	AB-123C		Issued to trucks and buses weighing at least 13 tons.
	Autocycle	October 2017	A1B2C		Issued to three-wheeled motorcycles.
	Commercial	1918	XBC-D12	XBC-123; XB-1234; X-12345; X1B-234; XBC-12D; XB-12CD; XBC1234; X12-B34; X-1234B; XB-123C	Serials XYA-100 through XZZ-999 and XYA-10A through XZZ-99Z reserved for Farmer plates. Current serial format began mid-2012. Vanity variants also issued.
	Commercial Motorcycle	1962	XB123		Infrequently issued.
	Commuter Van	1982	CV12345	CV-1234	Issued to airport vans and ride-share vehicles.
	Dealer Temporary	1953	DL-123 12		
	Dealer Transporter	c. 1970	DTT-12 12; 12 12 DTT		Issued to new vehicles being transported from manufacturers to dealers.
	Driving School	2019	DS-1234		
	Equipment In Transit	1949	12-1-AB	A-12-1; AB-12-1	Issued to construction vehicles, in groups of five (each plate in the group is distinguished by the small number in its serial, between 1 and 5). Issued annually through 1962.
	Farm Use	1941	GB-12C	F-1234; F-B123; F-B12C; FB-12C; FB12345	
	Handicapped	1977	1234H/B	H1234; 1234H; H/B1234	International Symbol of Access at left. Vanity variants also issued.
	Historic	1964	12345QQ	QQ-A123; 123A-QQ; QQ-1234; 1234-QQ; QQ12345	Issued to vehicles that are at least 25 years old and are used for exhibition purposes. Vanity and Courtesy variants also issued, with serial preceded by stacked Q/Q prefix.
	Historic Motorcycle	1976	Q1234		
	Hotel Bus	2014	OH-1234		Issued to small buses transporting passengers to and from hotels.
	In Transit Empty	1977	12-ZB	ZB-12	Issued to trucks and trailers that are empty when transported.
	Jitney	July 1, 2014	OJ-1234		Issued to small buses for urban transport. These buses used Omnibus plates prior to July 2014.
	Limousine	late 2000	OL1234A		Replaced Livery plate. Serials began at OL1000D. Vanity variants also issued, with serial of owner's choice preceded by stacked O/L prefix.
	Mobility Assistance Vehicle	July 1, 2014	OM-1234		Issued to vehicles transporting handicapped individuals.
	Moped	1983	1A2B3		
	Motorcycle	1912	1ABC2	AB123; 123AB; A123B; A1234; 1234A	Issued annually through 1960. Current serial format began 2009. Vanity and Courtesy variants also issued.
	Motorcycle Dealer	c. 1926	12-1DB	DB12-1	
	Motorcycle No Fee	1952	1234A		
	New Car Dealer	1960	DBC-12 12		Series DAA through DKZ used on these plates.
	No Fee	1932	NF12345	NF-C123	Issued to vehicles owned by nonprofit organizations. Courtesy variants also issued.
	Non-Conventional Dealer	c. 1965	DN-123 12		
	Omnibus	1922	OBC1234	OBC-123	Current serial format began 1992 at OXV1000.
	Omnibus 2	August 2014	O2-1234		Issued to buses owned by private transportation companies.
	Paratransit	July 1, 2014	OP-123A	OP-1234	Issued to small buses providing non-emergency medical transport. These buses used Omnibus, Commercial and No Fee plates prior to July 2014.
	Passenger Vanity	1959	varies	varies	Alcoholic vanity plates are banned.
	School Vehicle I	1977	S1-1234	S1-123A; 123A-S1; 1234AS1; S1-A123; A123-S1	Issued to full-size school buses (seating 17 or more passengers).
	School Vehicle II	1977	A123-S2	S2-123A; 123A-S2; 1234AS2; S2-A123	Issued to small school buses (seating under 17 passengers).
	Street Rod	1982	R1234		Issued to modified antique automobiles manufactured before 1949.
	Taxicab	July 1, 2014	OT-123A	OT-1234	Taxicabs used Omnibus plates prior to July 2014.
	Temporary	April 1, 2012	A123456		F, H, J, L, M, R, T, V, W, X, Z and C series of serials issued.
	Temporary Motorcycle	June 2015	A123456		Same design as regular Temporary plates, but smaller. J and L series of serials issued.
	Temporary Non-Resident	April 1, 2012	123456A		N, P, R and T series of serials issued.
	Tractor	1918	1234-TB	TR-1234; TR-C123; TS-C123	Infrequently issued.
	Trailer	1915	A12-TCD	TBC-123; TB-123C; 123-TBC; T123-BC; TBC1234; T1B-234; T12-B3C; TBC-12D	Current serial format began early 2023.
	Used Car Dealer	1960	12-DBC 12	DBC-12 12; 12 12 DBC	Series DLA through DSZ and DUA through DZZ used on these plates.
	Vehicle Converter	c. 1973	DTC-12 12; 12 12 DTC		
	Vehicle Manufacturer	1908	DTM-12 12; 12 12 DTM; DTN-12 12; 12 12 DTN		

==== Discontinued ====
Image	Type	First issued	Final serial format	Previous serial formats	Notes
	Boat	1919	1234; A123		"BL NJ" and last two digits of year embossed at right. Last issued 1962; stickers used for boat registration since at least 1973.
	Boat Dealer	by 1959	D12−1		"BL NJ" and last two digits of year embossed at right. Last issued 1962; stickers used for boat registration since at least 1973.
	Boat No Fee	by 1953	N/F12		"BL NJ" and last two digits of year embossed at right. Last issued 1962; stickers used for boat registration since at least 1973.
	Clam/Oyster Permit	1935	1234	C-1234; O-1234	Issued to vehicles used for the purpose of clam and oyster digging. All-numeric serials used from 1936 onwards. Discontinued sometime after 1938.
	Constructor	1951	12345		Issued mainly to construction dump trucks. Discontinued sometime after 1979.
	Gasoline License	1928	12345		Replaced by Motor Fuel Dealer in 1932 (below).
	Licensed Coal/Fuel Truck	1937	1234		Supplementary plates. Last issued 1973, but revalidated until at least 1980.
	Licensed Poultry Truck	by 1948	123		Supplementary plates. Last issued 1973.
	Livery	1979	OL1234A	OL-1234; 1234-OL; OL-123A	Livery vehicles used their own plates from 1917 to 1921, then Omnibus plates from 1922 until 1977 when the PUC LIM plate was introduced (below). Vanity variants also issued, with serial of owner's choice preceded by stacked O/L prefix. Replaced by Limousine in late 2000.
	Motor Fuel Dealer	1932	12345		Motorcycle-sized from 1936. Last issued 1942.
	Motor Fuel Transport	1936	12345		Motorcycle-sized plates issued to tanker trucks hauling gasoline or other motor fuel. Issued annually through 1972. Last issued 2010.
	NJ Transit Bus	1982	1234-NJ		Discontinued in the late 1990s; regular Omnibus plates issued to NJ Transit buses since.
	Outdoor Advertising	1931	12345		Used on signs and billboards. Discontinued sometime after 1956.
	Outdoor Advertising No Fee	by 1956	N/F123		Used on signs and billboards. Discontinued sometime after 1956.
	PUC LIM	1977	OL-1234		PUC LIM stood for "Public Utilities Commission - Limousine". Replaced by Livery in 1979 (above).
	Regulated Bulk Hauler	1981	1234		Issued to semi-trailers. Vertical "NJ" and "DMV" embossed at left and right respectively. Replaced by Apportioned in 1996.

=== Governmental ===
Image	Type	First issued	Current serial format	Previous serial formats	Notes
	Assembly	by 1936	A/B 1		Plates usually feature state seals either side of the number. The letters at the left are the Assembly member's initials.
	Atlantic City Expressway	1979	ACE 12		Used for all tollbooths of the Atlantic City Expressway.
	Cabinet		(numeric)		
	County Government	1926	CG1-CDE	CG-C123; CG-123C; A123-CG; CG12345	Current serial format began 2012.
	Department of Transportation	1959	TD12345	TD-123; TD-1234	"STATE GOVT" legend. Current serial format began c. 2004.
	Former Assembly				
	Former Senator				
	Governor	by 1935	1		Plates usually feature state seals either side of the number.
	Highway Authority	1959		HA-A123	No longer issued, as the Garden State Parkway is now under the purview of the Turnpike Authority.
	Mayor		A/B 1 C/D		The first two letters are a code signifying the municipality, and the last two letters are the mayor's initials.
	Mayor Emeritus	c. 2000	M/E1234		New Jersey Conference of Mayors logo at left. Vanity and Courtesy variants also issued.
	Municipal Government	1926	12345MG	MG-C123; MG-123C; MG-1234; 123MG-C; MG-12CD; MG12345	Current serial format began late 2013.
	Municipal No Fee				
	Municipal Government Motorcycle				
	Senate	by 1933	AB		Letters indicate senator's initials.
	Sheriff		A 1 A/B		The letter on the left indicates the county, while the letters on the right are the initials of the Sheriff for that county.
	State Government	1926	SG12345	SG-C123; SG-C12D	Current serial format began 1993.
	State Police	c. 1964	SPA123D	SP-A123	Used for all New Jersey State Police vehicle. State Police also has TP for vehicles assigned to turnpike patrol
	State Senate Majority Leader				
	Turnpike Authority	1959	TPA1234	TP-A123	Used for NJ turnpike maintenance vehicles and New Jersey State Police vehicles assigned to turnpike patrol
	U.S. Congress	c. 1952			
	U.S. Senate	c. 1952	1 or 2 (depending on seniority), flanked by state seals		

=== Professional ===
Image	Type	First issued	Current serial format	Previous serial formats	Notes
	Chiropractor	1977	1 DC 234		Vanity variants also issued.
	Dentist	1977	DDS 123; DMD 123		Vanity variants also issued.
	EMT	1993	E/M1234		Star of Life at left.
	Farmer	1933	XYC-12D, XZC-12D	XYC-123, XZC-123	
	Firefighter	1977	1A-B2	A1-2B	
	Firemen's Benevolent Association	1990	F/F1234		
	First Aider	1981	F1234		Cross at left.
	Fraternal Order of Police	1989	1234F/P	F/P1234	F/P9999 issued late 2019, followed by 1000F/P onwards.
	New Jersey Press	1979	NJP-123		
	New York Press	1977	1234NYP	NYP-123; 123-NYP	
	Newark Firefighter	2001	F/D1234		
	Operating Engineer	2005	O/E1234		
	Physician	1951	MD-1234; DO-1234	MD-C123	Vanity variants also issued.
	Podiatrist	1979	DPM-123		Vanity variants also issued.
	Policemen's Benevolent Association	1991	1234P/B	P/B1234	P/B9999 issued late 2018, followed by 1000P/B onwards.
	Society of Professional Engineers	1994	P/E1234		

=== Organizational ===
Image	Type	First issued	Current serial format	Previous serial formats	Notes
	Amateur Radio		(call sign)		
	Freemason		^{M}_{B}1234		
	Honor Legion		^{P}_{D}1234		
	Knights of Columbus (Columbianism)		^{K}_{C}1234		
	Rotary International		^{R}_{I}1234		
	Square Dancer		^{S}_{D}1234		
	Teamsters		^{I}_{B}1234		
	Telephone Pioneer		^{P}_{A}1234		
	United Bowhunters		^{U}_{B}1234		

=== Military and Veteran ===
Image	Type	First issued	Current serial format	Previous serial formats	Notes
	Air Force Auxiliary		^{C}_{P}1234		
	Air Force Reserve		^{C}_{F}1234		
	Air Force Retired		^{R}_{A}1234		
	Air Guard		^{N}_{G}A 123		The letter appearing after the N/G is the first letter of the plate owner's last name.
	Airborne		^{A}_{B}1234		
	American Legion		^{A}_{L}1234		
	Amvets		^{A}_{V}1234		
	Army Guard		^{N}_{G}A 123		The letter appearing after the N/G is the first letter of the plate owner's last name.
	Army Reserve		^{A}_{R}1234		
	Coast Guard Auxiliary		^{C}_{A}1234		
	Coast Guard Reserve		^{C}_{R}1234		
	Combat Veteran		^{C}_{I}1234		
	Combat Wounded		^{P}_{H}1234		
	Disabled American Veteran		^{W}_{D}1234	DAV-123	
	Disabled Veteran		^{D}_{V}1234		
	Gold Star Family	2011	^{M}_{H}1234		
	Leatherneck		^{M}_{L}1234		
	Merchant Marine		^{M}_{M}1234		
	Navy Cross		^{N}_{C}1234		
	Navy Lakehurst		^{L}_{K}1234		
	Navy League		^{N}_{L}1234		
	Navy Reserve		^{N}_{R}1234		
	Pearl Harbor '41		1234^{P}_{H}		
	Prisoner of War		P1234		
	Silver Star		1234^{S}_{S}		
	Silent Service		^{S}_{S}1234		
	Tin Can Sailors		^{D}_{D}1234		
	U.S. Army Retired		^{G}_{I}1234		
	Veterans of Foreign Wars		^{W}_{V}1234	VFW-123	
	Vietnam Veteran		^{V}_{V}1234		

=== College and University Optionals ===
Image	Type	First issued	Current serial format	Previous serial formats	Notes
	New Jersey Institute of Technology		^{J}_{T}1234		"Highlanders"
	Notre Dame		^{N}_{D}1234		
	Penn State Alumni		^{P}_{S}1234		
	Rutgers		^{R}_{U}1234, 1234^{R}_{U}		New graphic features Rutgers' red "R" and numbers-first format.
	Seton Hall		^{S}_{H}1234		Base revised in 2007 – rim is no longer embossed and has updated Pirates logo
	Stevens Tech		^{S}_{T}1234		
	Temple University		^{U}_{N}1234		
	University of Delaware		^{U}_{D}1234		
	University of Michigan		^{U}_{M}1234		
	West Point		^{W}_{P}1234		

=== Specialty ===
Image	Type	First issued	Current serial format	Previous serial formats	Notes
	Alpha Kappa Alpha	October 2017	^{I}_{V}1234		Features the Ivy leaf.
	Animal Friendly	1995		^{I}_{M}1234, ^{I}_{M}123A, ^{I}_{M}12AB (ended at ...99CZ)	No longer issued but still valid
	Animal Friendly (Mutts)	2002	^{I}_{M}BA12	^{I}_{M}12EA	Plate features characters from Patrick McDonnell's comic strip
	Battleship	1996	^{B}_{B}12AB	^{B}_{B}1234, 1234^{B}_{B}	Features an image of battleship USS New Jersey
	Baymen's Heritage	February 26, 1998	^{B}_{H}12AB	^{B}_{H}1234, 1234^{B}_{H}	Sports an image of the Tucker's Island Lighthouse
	Center for Food Action	2001		^{C}_{F}1234	No longer being issued (see below)
	Choose Life	2011	^{C}_{F}1234		Uses same prefix as previously issued Center for Food Action plates, of which less than 100 were registered.
	Conquer Cancer	1998	^{C}_{C}AB12	^{C}_{C}1234, ^{C}_{C}12AB, A123^{C}_{C}	
	Conserve Wildlife – Woodpecker	1993		^{C}_{W}1234, ^{C}_{W}123A, ^{C}_{W}12AB	No longer issued but still valid.
	Conserve Wildlife – Bald Eagle	June 26, 1997	A123^{W}_{C}	^{W}_{C}123A	
	Deborah Heart & Lung	2000	1234^{D}_{H}	^{D}_{H}1234	
	Discover NJ History	March 26, 1997	1234^{Z}_{Z}	^{Z}_{Z}1234	Features painting of a house in Lambertville, New Jersey by renowned New Jersey artist Harry Devlin. Proceeds go to the Historic License Plate Preservation Fund to save priceless historic buildings, artifacts and documents.
	Liberty State Park	1999	1234^{L}_{S}	^{L}_{S}1234	
	Meadowlands	2001	^{M}_{C}1234		
	New Jersey Agriculture	January 29, 2001	^{G}_{S}12BA,^{X}_{Y}123^{A}_{A} (farmer) ^{X}_{A}123^{A}_{A} (commercial) ^{F}_{X}123^{A}_{A} (farm use)	^{G}_{S}1234, 1234^{G}_{S}	
	NPDF Safe Cop		^{P}_{F}1234		
	Olympic Spirit	1995	1234^{U}_{S}	^{U}_{S}1234	
	Organ Donors Save Lives	2002	1234^{D}_{L}	^{D}_{L}1234	
	Pinelands	1998	^{P}_{L}12AB	^{P}_{L}1234	
	Price of Honor	2002	^{L}_{E}AB12	^{L}_{E}1234, 1234^{L}_{E}, ^{L}_{E}12AB, BA12^{L}_{E}	
	Shore to Please	November 1993	^{S}_{A}12AB	^{S}_{A}1234,^{S}_{A}123A, ^{S}_{C}123A, ^{S}_{E}123A, ^{S}_{F}123A, ^{S}_{J}123A, ^{S}_{K}123A, ^{S}_{L}123A, ^{S}_{N}123A, ^{S}_{R}123A, ^{S}_{U}123A	
	Treasure Our Trees	1998	^{W}_{E}123A, ^{X}_{A}123^{W}_{E} (commercial)	^{W}_{E}1234	
	United We Stand	2004	^{U}_{W}12AB	^{U}_{W}1234, 1234^{U}_{W}	

=== Sports ===
The New Jersey sports plates were introduced in the fall of 2010. They share a common serial format – R/M12AB – and were the first NJ plates to be issued with screened, rather than embossed, serials.

Image	Type	Notes
	NASCAR	Plates feature the number and signature of one of the following eight drivers: Dale Earnhardt, Dale Earnhardt Jr., Danica Patrick, Jeff Gordon, Jimmie Johnson, Kevin Harvick, Martin Truex Jr. and Tony Stewart. There is also a Dale Earnhardt Hall of Fame commemorative plate, a Ford Racing plate and a generic NASCAR Fan plate.
	NBA	Plates feature the logo of either the New York Knicks or the Philadelphia 76ers. There was also a New Jersey Nets plate, which was discontinued when the Nets moved to Brooklyn in 2012.
	NHL	Plates feature the logo of either the New Jersey Devils or the Philadelphia Flyers.
	MLB	Plates feature the logo of either the New York Yankees, the New York Mets or the Philadelphia Phillies.
	NFL	Plates feature a graphic of the helmet of either the New York Jets, the New York Giants or the Philadelphia Eagles.

=== Other ===
Image	Type	First issued	Notes
	Beach Buggy Association	early 1970s	Issued to members of the New Jersey Beach Buggy Association for member identification; the serial number on each plate is the owner's membership number. Current plate design is dark red on white with the slogan "Fighting For Beach Access Since 1954".
