= Fred Akshar =

American politician

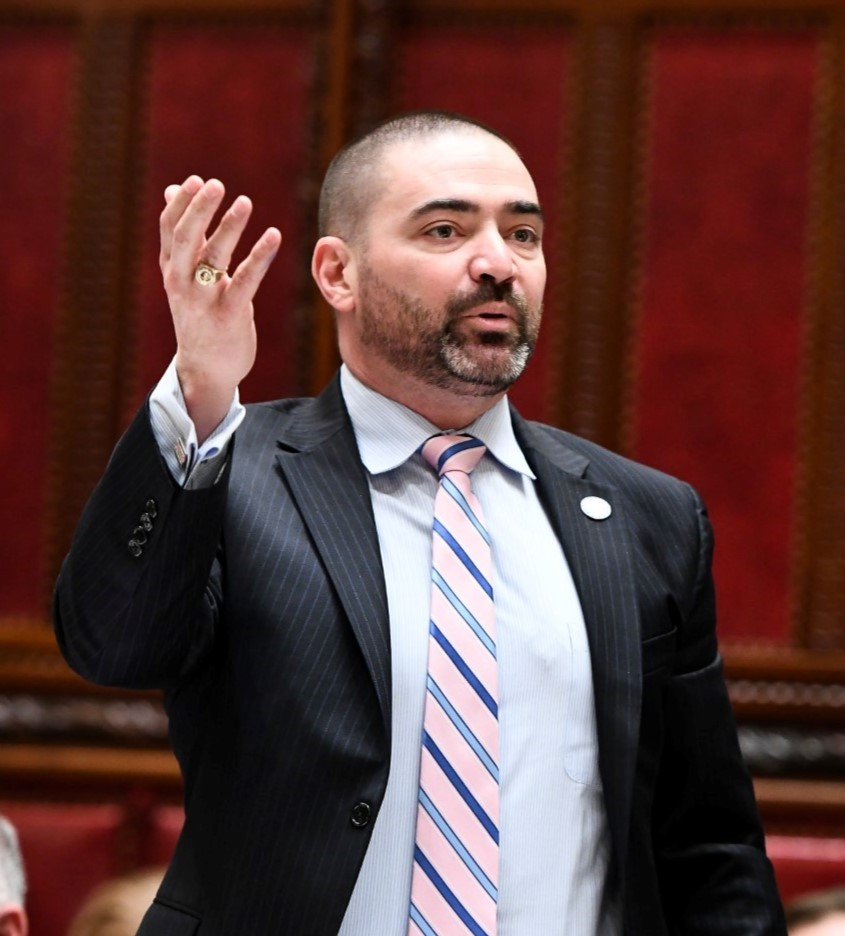
- Akshar in 2019

Sheriff of Broome County, New York
- Incumbent
- Assumed office January 1, 2023
- Preceded by: David E. Harder

Member of the New York State Senate from the 52nd district
- In office November 4, 2015 – December 31, 2022
- Preceded by: Tom Libous
- Succeeded by: Lea Webb

Personal details
- Born: November 29, 1978 (age 47)
- Party: Republican
- Education: Broome Community College
- Website: Official website

Frederick J. Akshar II is an American Republican politician from the State of New York. Akshar represented District 52 in the New York State Senate from 2015 to 2022. Since January 1, 2023, Akshar has served as the Broome County Sheriff.

== Background ==
Akshar grew up in Afton in the Southern Tier region of New York. He graduated from Broome Community College as well as the FBI Academy.

A law enforcement officer, Akshar worked at the Chenango County Sheriff's Office and the Broome County Sheriff's Office. His work in law enforcement spanned 15 years, and he served as Captain of the Law Enforcement Division at the Broome County Sheriff's Office. Akshar was named undersheriff of Broome County in June 2015. Prior to his election to the New York State Senate, he also served on the Crime Victims Assistance Center Board and the Broome Opioid Abuse Council.

== New York State Senate ==
In 2015, long-serving State Senator Tom Libous forfeited his Senate seat after being found guilty of lying to the federal authorities. As a result, a special election was called in Senate District 52, and the Republican Party nominated Akshar to replace Libous. While Democrats targeted the seat and ran former Broome County Executive Barbara Fiala against him, Akshar received nearly 78% of the vote and defeated Fiala. He was re-elected in 2016 and 2018.

In July 2018, Akshar's staff confirmed that Akshar was "in a relationship with Jessica Williams, who until last week was on Akshar's payroll as his director of administration." A report indicated that Williams had "received eight salary increases and three promotions during her roughly 2½ years on Akshar's payroll, rising from a part-timer making $32,600 in 2015 to a full-timer making $85,000 today".

Akshar was appointed chair of the Senate Republican Campaign Committee in December 2018, replacing Sen. Catharine Young. Young had attempted to oust Senate Republican Leader John J. Flanagan from his leadership position in November 2018, and Akshar had supported Flanagan.

In January 2019, The New York Times noted Akshar's frustration with the continuing push for transgender rights; when "State Senator Jessica Ramos...said lawmakers should go even further to help transgender New Yorkers," Akshar responded, "Jesus Christ! Further?"

On January 23, 2019, Akshar voted against the NY DREAM Act, which passed both houses of the State Legislature. The bill would extend state financial aid to undocumented immigrant students who were brought to the United States as children.

On March 30, 2021, After NYS voted and passed S.854 to Legalize Recreational Marijuana, Akshar released a message claiming that traffic accidents are going up in other states. Shortly after he announced his run for Broome County Sheriff. "We know that in states that have legalized recreational marijuana, fatal accidents have shot up - a nearly 50% increase in Colorado and double in Washington. Across the board in states that have legalized recreational marijuana, we’ve seen substantial increases in vehicle accidents vs. neighboring states where it is not legal. We know that unemployment has risen, marijuana hospitalizations and teen suicide have risen as well as mental health rates."

On June 3, 2021, Akshar announced his intention not to run for reelection for his seat in the New York State Senate, instead opting to run for Broome County Sheriff in 2022.

== Personal life ==
During his 2015 campaign for New York State Senate, Akshar's opponent accused him of unethical behavior in connection with a 2009 motor vehicle accident involving the nephew of his then-girlfriend, Kate Newcomb. Akshar denied wrongdoing, and no charges were filed following an investigation.

In November 2016, PressConnects.com described Kate Newcomb, a captain in the Broome County Sheriff's Office, as Akshar's longtime girlfriend.

As of July 2018, Akshar was dating former staffer Jessica Williams. He announced his engagement to Jessica Fiacco (also known as Jessica Williams) in December 2018.

In April 2019, Akshar was accused of engaging in an inappropriate relationship with the mother of a murder victim. At that time, Akshar acknowledged having had a "brief, consensual relationship" with Mirella Masciarelli some years earlier. Masciarelli was the mother of Mario Masciarelli, whose 2013 murder Akshar had helped to investigate; Akshar also testified at a pretrial hearing in the case. Masciarelli described Akshar as a "predator" who "'interjected himself into [her] life in a way that...was not professional as a captain in the Broome County Sheriff's Office'" and took advantage of her grief over the loss of her son. Akshar denied any wrongdoing and accused Masciarelli of engaging in an "attempted smear campaign".

As of January 2019, Akshar resides in Endwell, New York.

Political offices
Preceded by Tom Libous	New York State Senate, 52nd District; 2015–present	Incumbent
