= New Jersey Motor Vehicle Commission =

Government agency

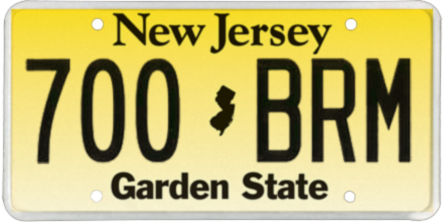
- Sample of a current New Jersey license plate

Agency overview
- Formed: 2003
- Preceding agency: New Jersey Division of Motor Vehicles
- Jurisdiction: New Jersey
- Headquarters: 225 E. State Street, Trenton, New Jersey
- Employees: 1,449
- Annual budget: $476,780,000
- Agency executive: Latrecia “Trish” Littles-Floyd, Acting Chair & Chief Administrator
- Parent agency: State of New Jersey
- Website: www.nj.gov/mvc

The New Jersey Motor Vehicle Commission (NJMVC or simply MVC) is a governmental agency of the U.S. state of New Jersey. The equivalent of the Department of Motor Vehicles in other states, it is responsible for titling, registering and inspecting automobiles, and issuing driver's licenses.

== Organization ==
The MVC is composed of eight members, four of whom are appointed by the governor. Three cabinet members also serve on the MVC on an ex officio basis: the New Jersey Attorney General, the State Treasurer and the Commissioner of the New Jersey Department of Transportation. The eighth position is reserved for the Chief Administrator, a non-voting member, who also serves as the Chair of the MVC.

Amy Mallet, Diane Legreide, Walter S. Orcutt and Stephen S. Scaturro are the gubernatorial appointments. On February 20, 2018, Brenda Sue Fulton was nominated to the position of Chief Administrator of the MVC by Governor Phil Murphy. Fulton, a former U.S. Army Captain, is the 23rd individual to lead the organization in its more than 100 years of existence, as well as the first openly gay Cabinet member in New Jersey history.

There are approximately 2,400 MVC employees at 71 locations throughout the state.

== History ==
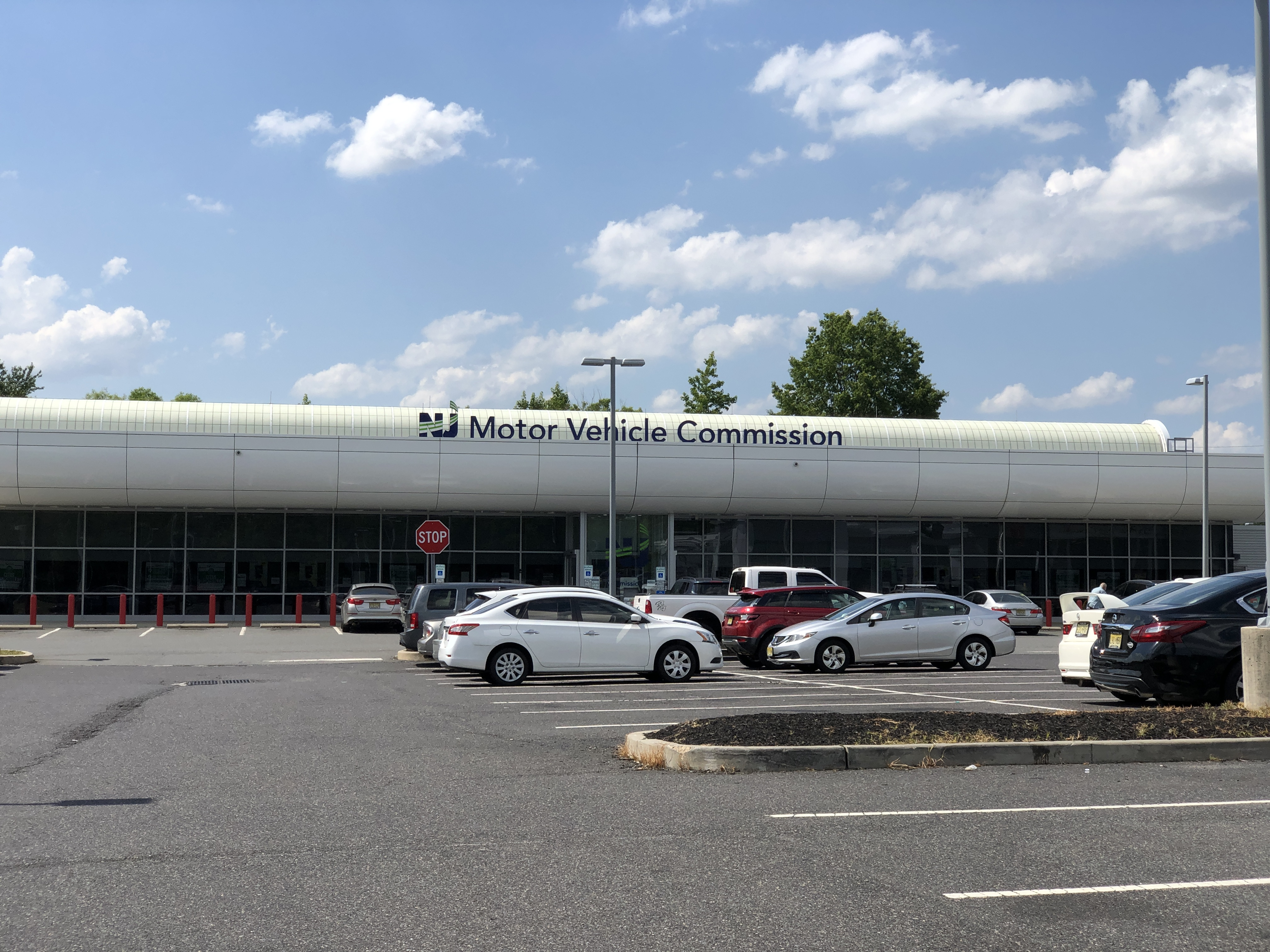
MVC location in Lawrence Township, Mercer County

Following the passage of the Motor Vehicle Security & Customer Service Act of 2003, the former New Jersey Division of Motor Vehicles (NJDMV or simply the DMV) was renamed as the New Jersey Motor Vehicle Commission. The new agency underwent a number of major overhauls in the areas of security and service, including the implementation of a more secure licensing process and the digital driver license and enhanced customer service training. Like most other DMVs, the former New Jersey DMV had a notorious reputation for poor customer service.

Some of the major accomplishments in recent years have been a dramatic reduction of customer wait times, expansion of online services, decentralization of various services, modernization of the physical and technological infrastructure, enhancement of security measures and introduction of mandatory customer service training for employees.

Timeline of some notable MVC accomplishments

- May 2003 - The New Jersey Motor Vehicle Commission is formed, replacing the DMV notorious for poor customer service.
- January 2004 - The MVC issues the state's first, security-enhanced Digital Driver License (DDL).
- January 2004 - The MVC reinstitutes Saturday hours of service.
- August 2004 - The MVC begins On-Board Diagnostics (OBD) vehicle testing.
- May 2005 - The MVC opens the state's first Model Agency in the City of Camden.
- September 2007 - The MVC begins accepting credit card payments for motor vehicle transactions.
- March 2008 - The MVC begins offering approved online defensive driving courses.
- January 2009 - The MVC opens the state's first Model Agency which was built from the ground up on state-owned land in Freehold Township.
- July 2010 - The MVC introduces more convenient evening service hours at its agencies until 7:30 p.m. on Tuesdays.
- August 2010 - The MVC made changes to the New Jersey Vehicle Inspection Program eliminating the mechanical defects (safety) portion of the inspection process for passenger vehicles, saving the state more than $11 million annually, joining 28 other states and the District of Columbia.
- October 2010 - The MVC begins the sale of sports-themed license plates featuring the sports of NASCAR, baseball, football, basketball and hockey.
- September 2016 - Governor Chris Christie signs a bill into law that allows for the use of a backup camera and parking sensors on the automobile state driving test, which previously weren't allowed while taking the test. This was in compliance with a federal law requiring all cars made after May 2018 to have built in backup cameras.
- September 2019 - To comply with DHS enforcement, the MVC began implementation of REAL ID, a federal requirement for state driver licenses mandated by the Real ID Act of 2005. The agency significantly expanded online services, hired more staff, and added a new "take-a-ticket" queuing system to prepare for the transition.
- November 2020 - The MVC rolls out a new license design with modern security features, issued centrally from a secure production facility.

== Administrative License Suspensions ==
The MVC has the authority under N.J.S.A. Title 39 to suspend or revoke a driver's license and/or registration in various circumstances related to, or unrelated to, judicial proceedings. Possible reasons why a driver could receive a Notice of Scheduled Suspension arising as a direct result of administrative action include:

- Persistent Violator Suspensions
- Physical or Mental Disqualification
- Abandonment of a Motor Vehicle on a Public Highway
- Traffic Violations or Accidents Resulting in a Death or Serious Bodily Injury
- Leaving the Scene of an Accident involving a Fatality or Serious Injury
- Accumulating Three or More Suspensions
- Misstatement of Fact on a Motor Vehicle Application
- Failure to Pay Motor Vehicle Surcharges
- Moving Violations During a Period of Suspension (Unticketed Driving While Suspended Instances)
- Violation of License Probation or Warning Period Following a Suspension

== See also ==
- Vehicle registration plates of New Jersey
