= Dickinson, Broome County, New York =

Dickinson, New York
- Town
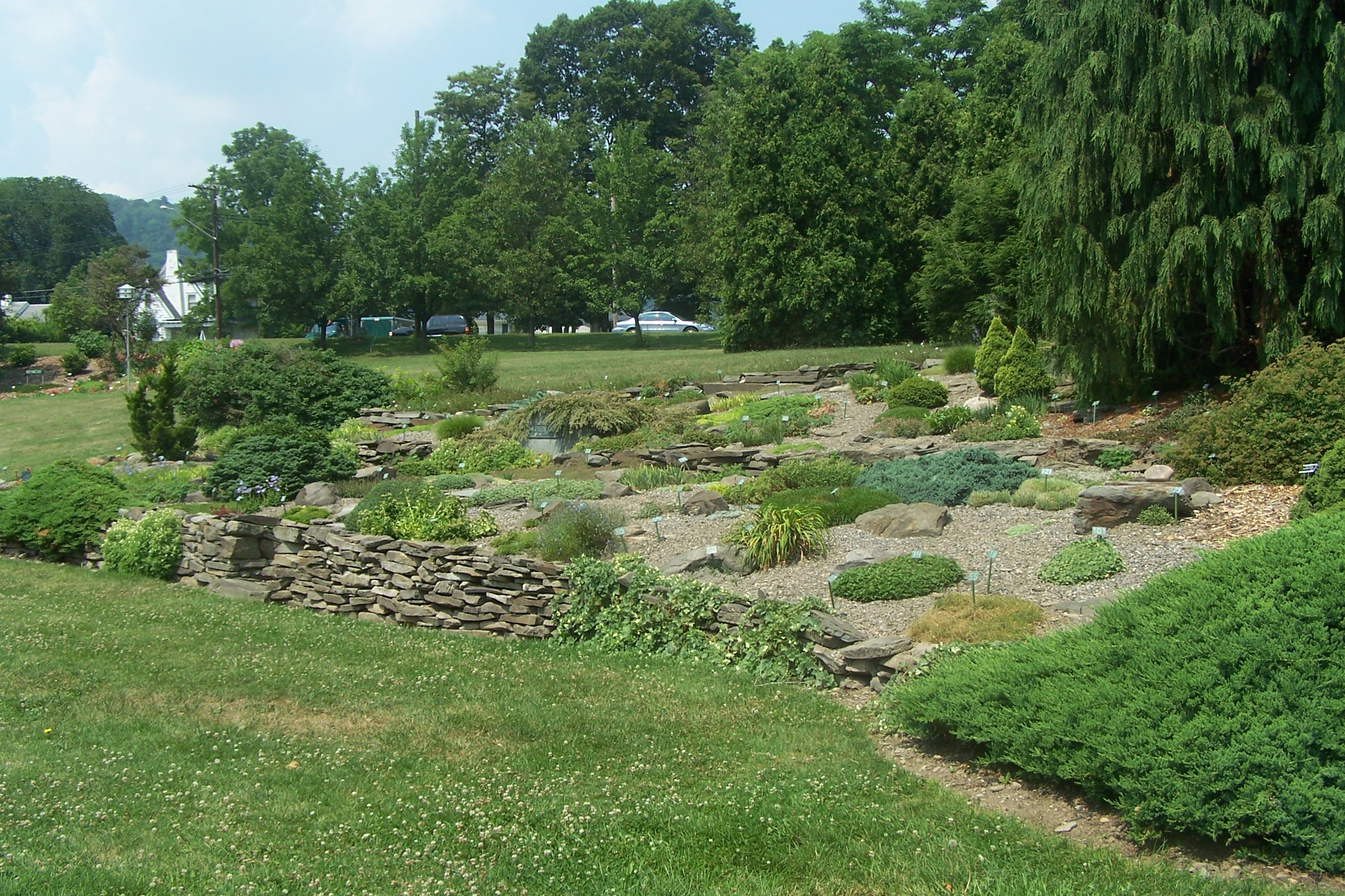
- Cutler Botanic Gardens in Dickinson

- Flag
- Motto: "A community rich in history and family"
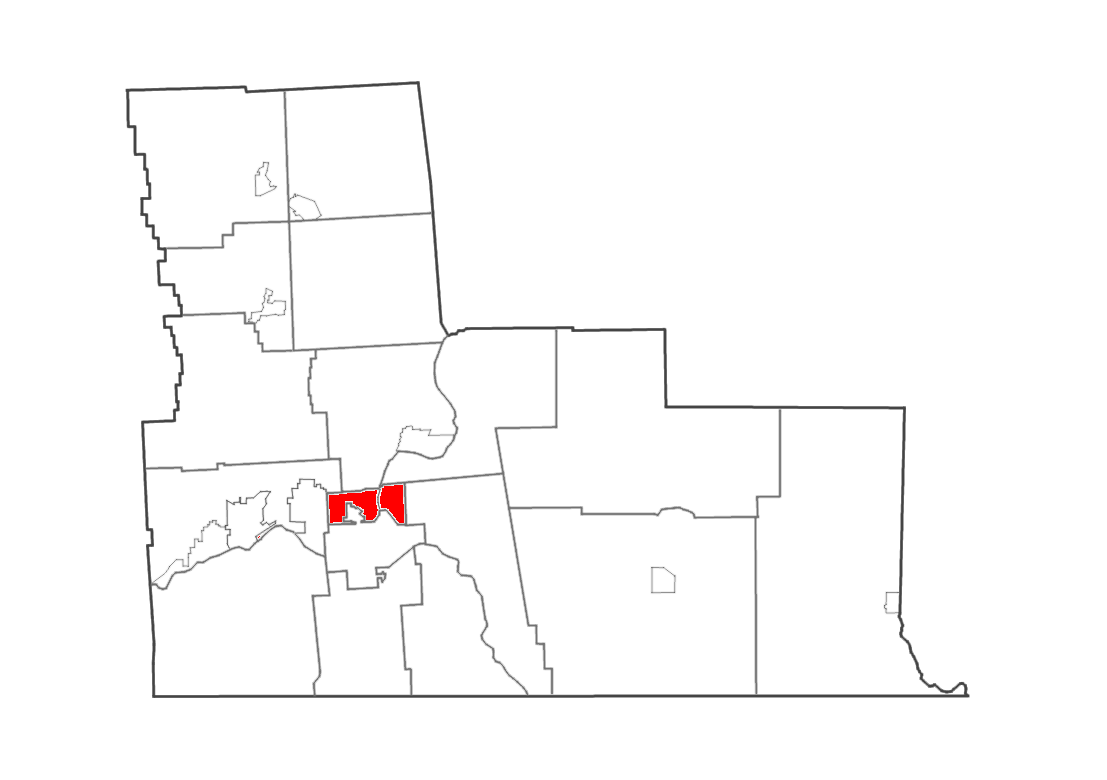
- Location within Broome County

- Location within New York Location within the United States
- Coordinates: 42°7′43″N 75°54′43″W
- Country: United States
- State: New York
- County: Broome

Government
  - Type: Town Council
  - Town Supervisor: Michael Marinaccio
  - Town Council: Members' List: • Sharon M. Exley; • Stephen M. Gardner; • Daniel F. Morabito; • Thomas J. Burns

Area
  - Total: 4.86 sq mi (12.60 km^{2})
  - Land: 4.76 sq mi (12.34 km^{2})
  - Water: 0.10 sq mi (0.26 km^{2})
- Elevation: 843 ft (257 m)

Population (2020)
  - Total: 5,083 ▼
  - Estimate (2021): 5,036
  - Density: 1,084.2/sq mi (418.62/km^{2})
- Time zone: UTC-5 (Eastern (EST))
  - Summer (DST): UTC-4 (EDT)
- ZIP Codes: 13901, 13904, 13905 (Binghamton)
- Area code: 607
- FIPS code: 36-20588
- GNIS feature ID: 978903
- Website: townofdickinson.com

Dickinson is a town in Broome County, New York, United States. The population was 5,083 at the 2020 census. The town was named after Daniel S. Dickinson.

The town is adjacent to Binghamton and forms a suburb to that city.

== History ==
The town of Dickinson was established in 1890 from the Town of Binghamton.

The former Chenango Canal (1834–1876) passed through the town, following the Chenango River. The current village of Port Dickinson formed as a port on the canal. The canal linked Binghamton to Troy and the Erie Canal.

== Geography ==
According to the United States Census Bureau, the town of Dickinson has a total area of 4.9 square miles (12.6 km^{2}), of which 4.8 square miles (12.4 km^{2}) is land and 0.12 square miles (0.3 km^{2}), or 2.15%, is water.

The town is divided by the Chenango River.

Interstate 81 joins Interstate 88 by the northern town line. Interstate 86 also runs through parts of the town. U.S. Route 11 passes across the southern part of the town, turning north on the west side of the Chenango River. New York State Route 7 is a major north-south highway in the eastern part of Dickinson.

=== Adjacent towns and areas ===
To the north lie the towns of Chenango and Fenton. To the east is the town of Kirkwood. To the south lies the city of Binghamton, and to the west, the town is bordered by the town of Union, including the village of Johnson City.

== Demographics ==
Historical population
Census	Pop.	Note	%±
1900	728		—
1910	832		14.3%
1920	1,975		137.4%
1930	4,255		115.4%
1940	5,060		18.9%
1950	5,450		7.7%
1960	6,591		20.9%
1970	5,687		−13.7%
1980	5,594		−1.6%
1990	5,486		−1.9%
2000	5,339		−2.7%
2010	5,278		−1.1%
2020	5,083		−3.7%
2021 (est.)	5,036		−0.9%
U.S. Decennial Census

As of the census of 2000, there were 5,335 people, 1,980 households, and 1,219 families residing in the town. The population density was 1,114.8 inhabitants per square mile (430.4/km^{2}). There were 2,131 housing units at an average density of 445.3 per square mile (171.9/km^{2}). The racial makeup of the town was 93.27% White, 4.20% African American, 0.09% Native American, 0.62% Asian, 0.82% from other races, and 0.99% from two or more races. Hispanic or Latino of any race were 1.78% of the population.

There were 1,980 households, out of which 26.3% had children under the age of 18 living with them, 46.8% were married couples living together, 11.2% had a female householder with no husband present, and 38.4% were non-families. 33.5% of all households were made up of individuals, and 15.3% had someone living alone who was 65 years of age or older. The average household size was 2.25 and the average family size was 2.87.

In the town, the population was spread out, with 19.0% under the age of 18, 8.6% from 18 to 24, 28.4% from 25 to 44, 23.5% from 45 to 64, and 20.4% who were 65 years of age or older. The median age was 41 years. For every 100 females, there were 102.8 males. For every 100 females age 18 and over, there were 100.1 males.

The median income for a household in the town was $38,996, and the median income for a family was $49,583. Males had a median income of $33,654 versus $25,699 for females. The per capita income for the town was $19,246. About 4.6% of families and 7.2% of the population were below the poverty line, including 9.5% of those under age 18 and 5.0% of those age 65 or over.

== Communities and locations in Dickinson ==
- SUNY Broome Community College – A public two year college west of the Chenango River.
- Broom County Alms House – A historic building demolished in 2010
- Cutler Botanic Garden – A botanical garden in the town.
- Otsiningo Park – A park on the west bank of the Chenango River.
- Port Dickinson – The village of Port Dickinson is on the east bank of the Chenango River.
