= SUNY Broome Community College =

Community college in Broome County, New York, US

SUNY Broome
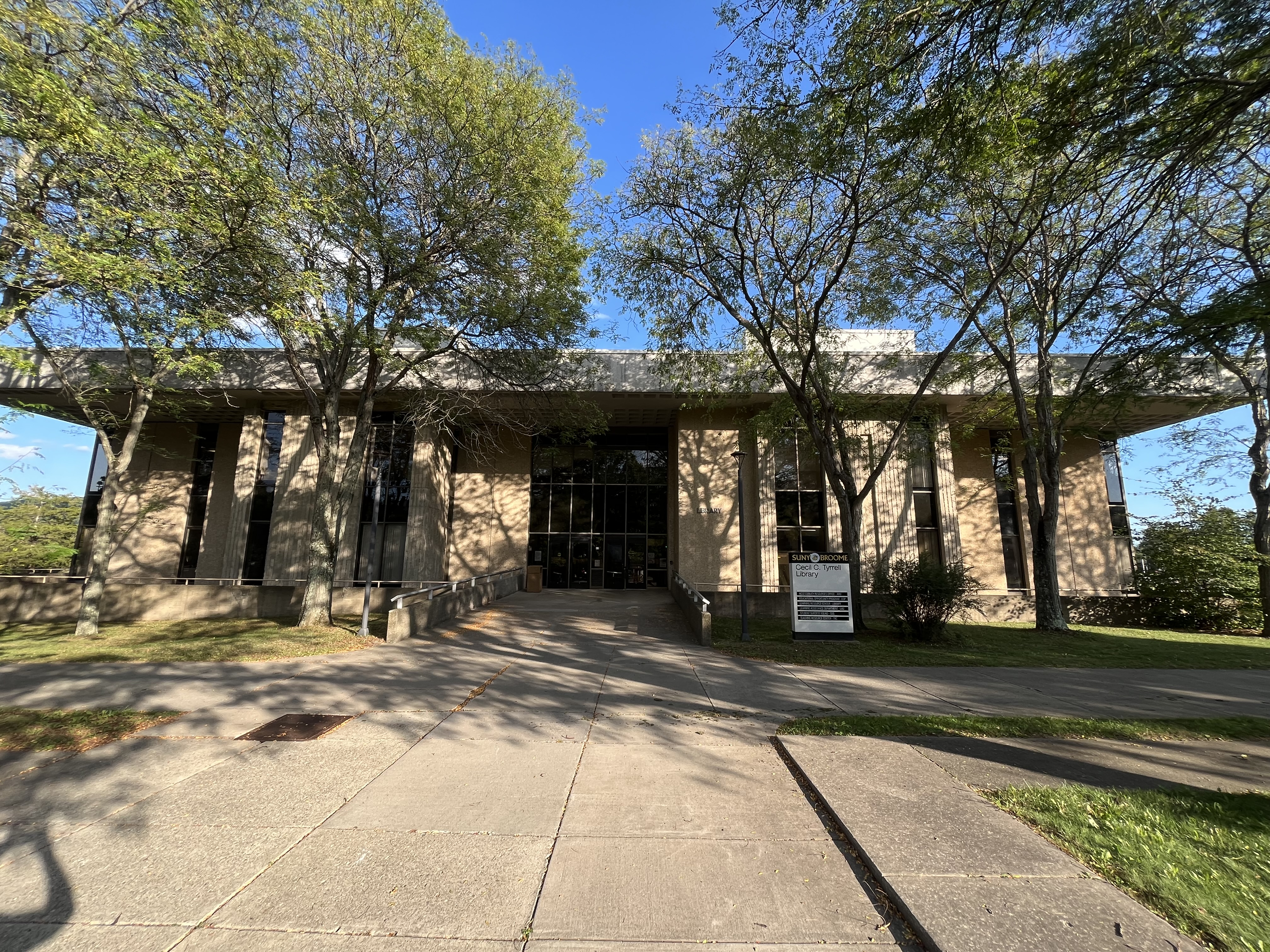
- Library
- Former names: New York State Institute of Applied Arts and Sciences at Binghamton; Broome County Technical Institute; Broome Technical Community College
- Type: Public community college
- Established: 1946; 80 years ago
- Parent institution: State University of New York
- Endowment: $44.95 million (2025)
- President: Tony D. Hawkins
- Undergraduates: 5,929 (fall 2025)
- Location: Dickinson, New York, United States; 42.134999°N 75.91012°W
- Campus: Suburban 200 acres (0.81 km^{2})
- Colors: Black and Gold
- Nickname: Hornets
- Sporting affiliations: National Junior College Athletic Association, Region III
- Mascot: Stinger
- Website: www.sunybroome.edu

SUNY Broome Community College (BCC or SUNY Broome) is a public community college in Broome County, New York. It is part of the State University of New York (SUNY). The college was founded in 1946 and has gone through several name changes. The college enrolls 6,000 students and it has an alumni network of 57,000 graduates.

SUNY Broome serves students from a single campus on Upper Front Street in Dickinson, New York and the college's Culinary & Event Center, located in the City of Binghamton. The campus' fifteen buildings comprise 610,000 square feet (57,000 m^{2}) of space and feature athletic facilities such as baseball fields, soccer field, publicly accessible tennis courts, the Dick Baldwin Gym, named after the third winningest college basketball coach across both two- and four-year colleges, and the SUNY Broome Ice Center, a 758-seat hockey arena that is used by a variety of different local ice hockey & figure skating organizations throughout the community.

There is also a theater which hosts campus performances of plays and other theatrical work, called the Little Theatre.

== Timeline ==
- 1946: Established as New York State Institute of Applied Arts & Sciences at Binghamton (with "New York State" sometimes abbreviated "NYS")
- 1953: Became Broome County Technical Institute
- 1956: Became Broome Technical Community College
- 1957: Moved to new campus on Upper Front Street (NY Route 11)
- 1971: Name changed to Broome Community College
- 2013: Name changed to SUNY Broome

== Athletics ==
The SUNY Broome Hornets participate in the NJCAA as a member of Region III.

Men's sports:

- Baseball
- Basketball
- Cross country
- Soccer
- Track and field
- Competitive Cheer

Women's sports:

- Basketball
- Cross country
- Soccer
- Softball
- Volleyball
- Track and field
- Competitive Cheer

The women's soccer team won the national championship in 2007, 2008, and 2016.

== Notable alumni ==
- Christopher L. Augostini, President of Emory University
- Payton Gendron, mass shooter of a Tops Friendly Markets
