= Triangle, New York =

- Town
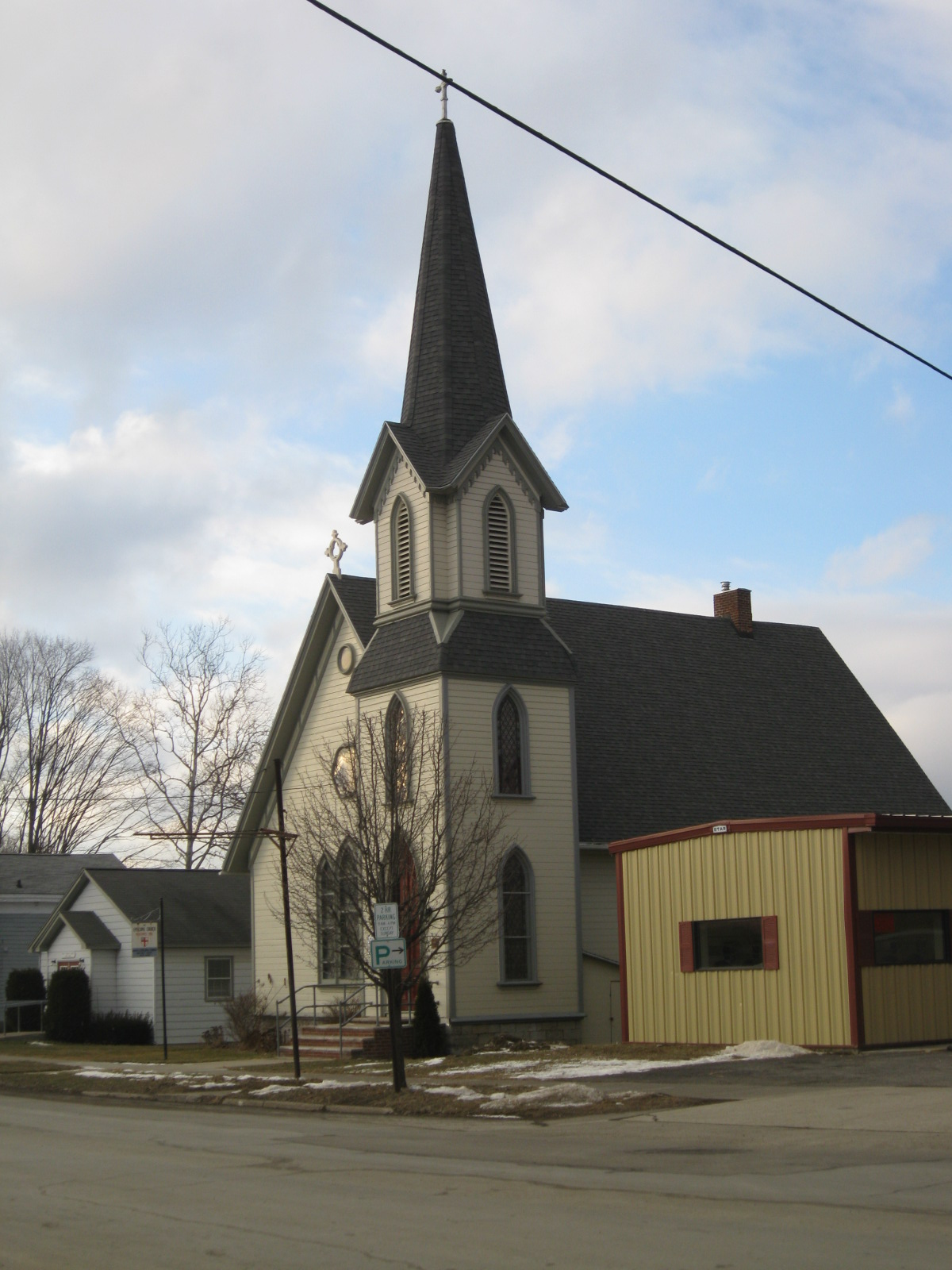
- Grace Episcopal Church in Whitney Point

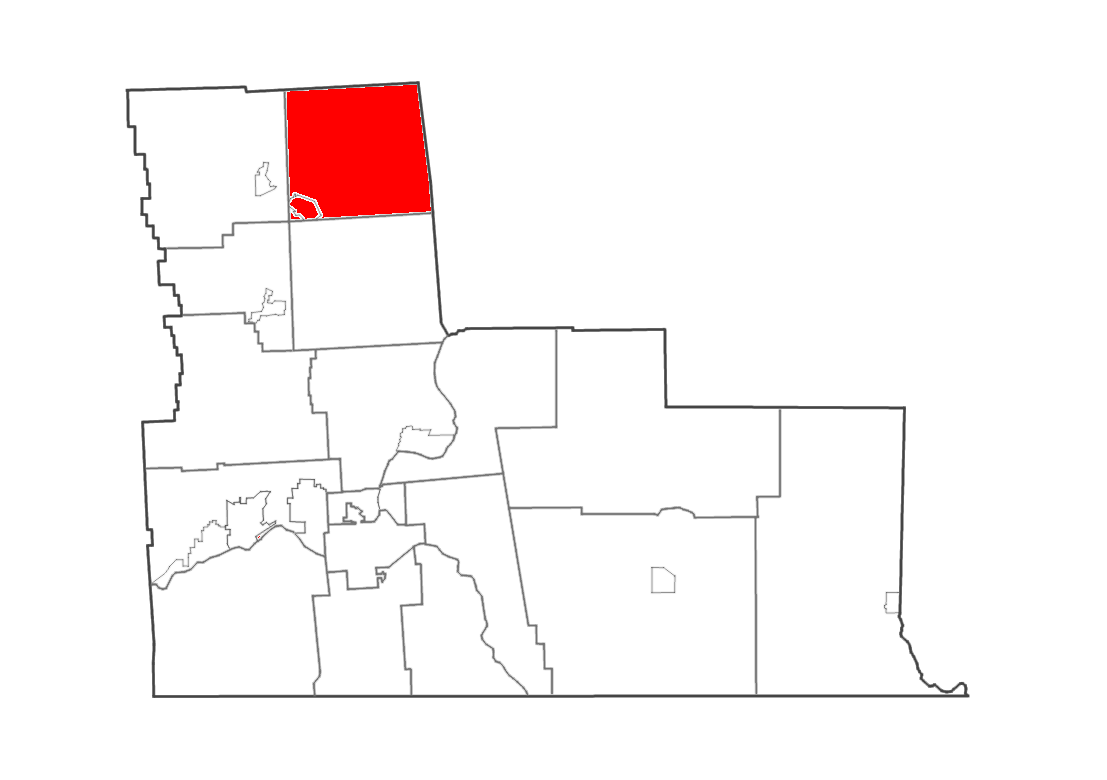
- Location in Broome County

- Location within New York Location within the United States
- Coordinates: 42°20′57″N 75°56′20″W
- Country: United States
- State: New York
- County: Broome

Government
  - Type: Town Council
  - Town Supervisor: Stephen D. Doherty
  - Town Council: Members' List: • John Orzel; • Judy Rapp; • Mary Mesceda-Knoop; • Vacant

Area
  - Total: 39.78 sq mi (103.03 km^{2})
  - Land: 37.88 sq mi (98.10 km^{2})
  - Water: 1.91 sq mi (4.94 km^{2})
- Elevation: 1,388 ft (423 m)

Population (2020)
  - Total: 2,809
  - Estimate (2016): 2,841
- Time zone: UTC-5 (Eastern (EST))
  - Summer (DST): UTC-4 (EDT)
- ZIP Codes: 13862 (Whitney Point); 13746 (Chenango Forks); 13778 (Greene); 13803 (Marathon); 13863 (Willet)
- FIPS code: 36-007-75319
- GNIS feature ID: 0979557
- Website: https://www.townoftriangle.org/

Triangle is a town in Broome County, New York, United States. The population was 2,809 at the 2020 census. The town's primary settlement is the village of Whitney Point.

The town is in the northeastern part of the county and is north of Binghamton.

== History ==
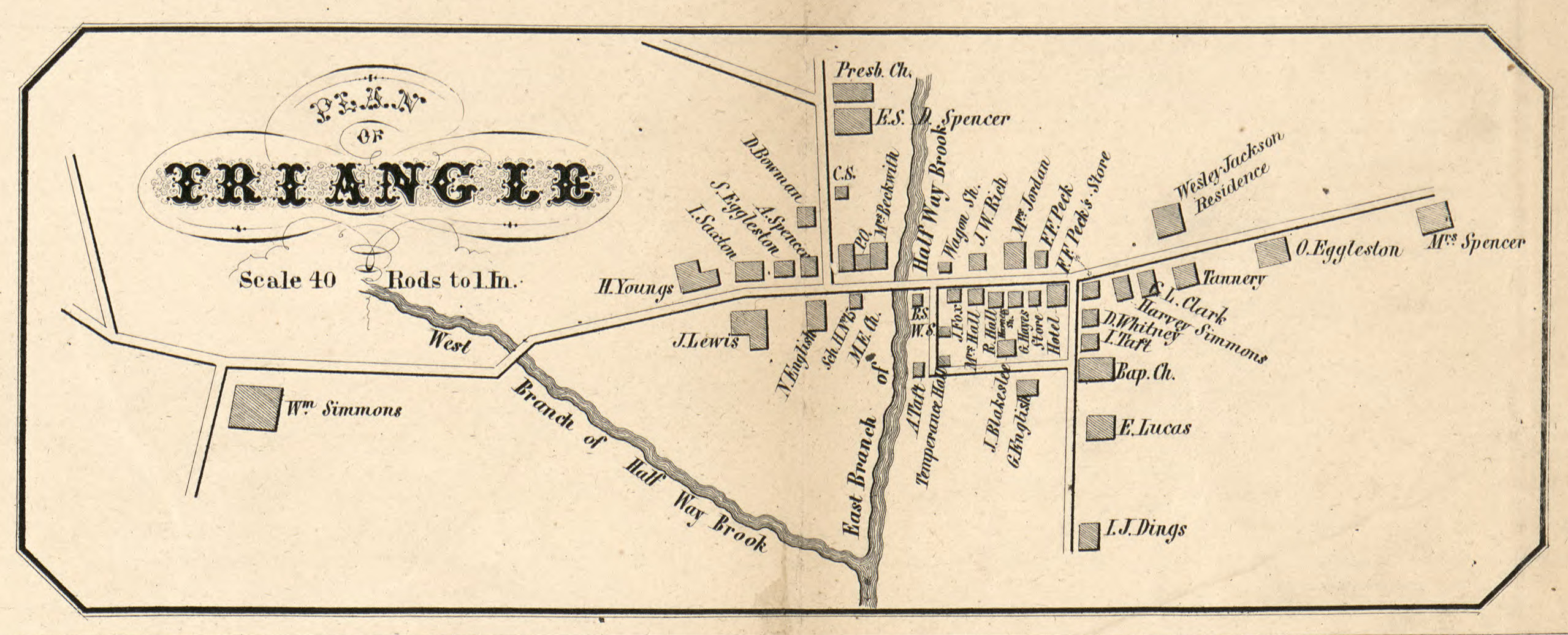
Plan of Triangle (1855)

The area was first settled circa 1791. The town of Triangle was formed from the town of Lisle in 1831. The area had previously been called the "Chenango Triangle".

In 1871, the community of Whitney Point incorporated as a village within the town.

== Geography ==
According to the United States Census Bureau, the town of Triangle has a total area of 39.8 square miles (103.0 km^{2}), of which 37.9 square miles (98.1 km^{2}) is land and 1.9 square miles (4.9 km^{2}), or 4.79%, is water.

The Tioughnioga River, a tributary of the Susquehanna River, flows through the southwestern part of the town.

The east town line is the border of Chenango County, and the northern town line is the border of Cortland County.

New York State Route 206 is an east-west highway in the town. New York State Route 26 is a north-south highway on the eastern side of Whitney Point Reservoir. Interstate 81 and U.S. Route 11, along with New York State Route 79, pass through the southwest corner of the town at Whitney Point.

== Demographics ==
Historical population
Census	Pop.	Note	%±
1840	1,692		—
1850	1,728		2.1%
1860	1,693		−2.0%
1870	1,944		14.8%
1880	2,073		6.6%
1890	1,879		−9.4%
1900	1,727		−8.1%
1910	1,600		−7.4%
1920	1,458		−8.9%
1930	1,452		−0.4%
1940	1,575		8.5%
1950	1,733		10.0%
1960	2,019		16.5%
1970	2,285		13.2%
1980	2,618		14.6%
1990	3,006		14.8%
2000	3,032		0.9%
2010	2,946		−2.8%
2016 (est.)	2,841		−3.6%
U.S. Decennial Census

As of the census of 2000, there were 3,032 people, 1,131 households, and 809 families residing in the town. The population density was 79.6 inhabitants per square mile (30.7/km^{2}). There were 1,245 housing units at an average density of 32.7 per square mile (12.6/km^{2}). The racial makeup of the town was 97.76% White, 0.20% African American, 0.26% Native American, 0.33% Asian, 0.10% Pacific Islander, 0.26% from other races, and 1.09% from two or more races. Hispanic or Latino of any race were 0.86% of the population.

There were 1,131 households, out of which 39.6% had children under the age of 18 living with them, 56.2% were married couples living together, 10.4% had a female householder with no husband present, and 28.4% were non-families. 21.9% of all households were made up of individuals, and 8.0% had someone living alone who was 65 years of age or older. The average household size was 2.68 and the average family size was 3.14.

In the town, the population was spread out, with 29.5% under the age of 18, 7.8% from 18 to 24, 28.2% from 25 to 44, 23.1% from 45 to 64, and 11.4% who were 65 years of age or older. The median age was 36 years. For every 100 females, there were 97.5 males. For every 100 females age 18 and over, there were 94.3 males.

The median income for a household in the town was $35,982, and the median income for a family was $41,220. Males had a median income of $29,184 versus $24,792 for females. The per capita income for the town was $15,734. About 10.0% of families and 11.4% of the population were below the poverty line, including 15.3% of those under age 18 and 5.5% of those age 65 or over.

== Communities and locations in Triangle ==
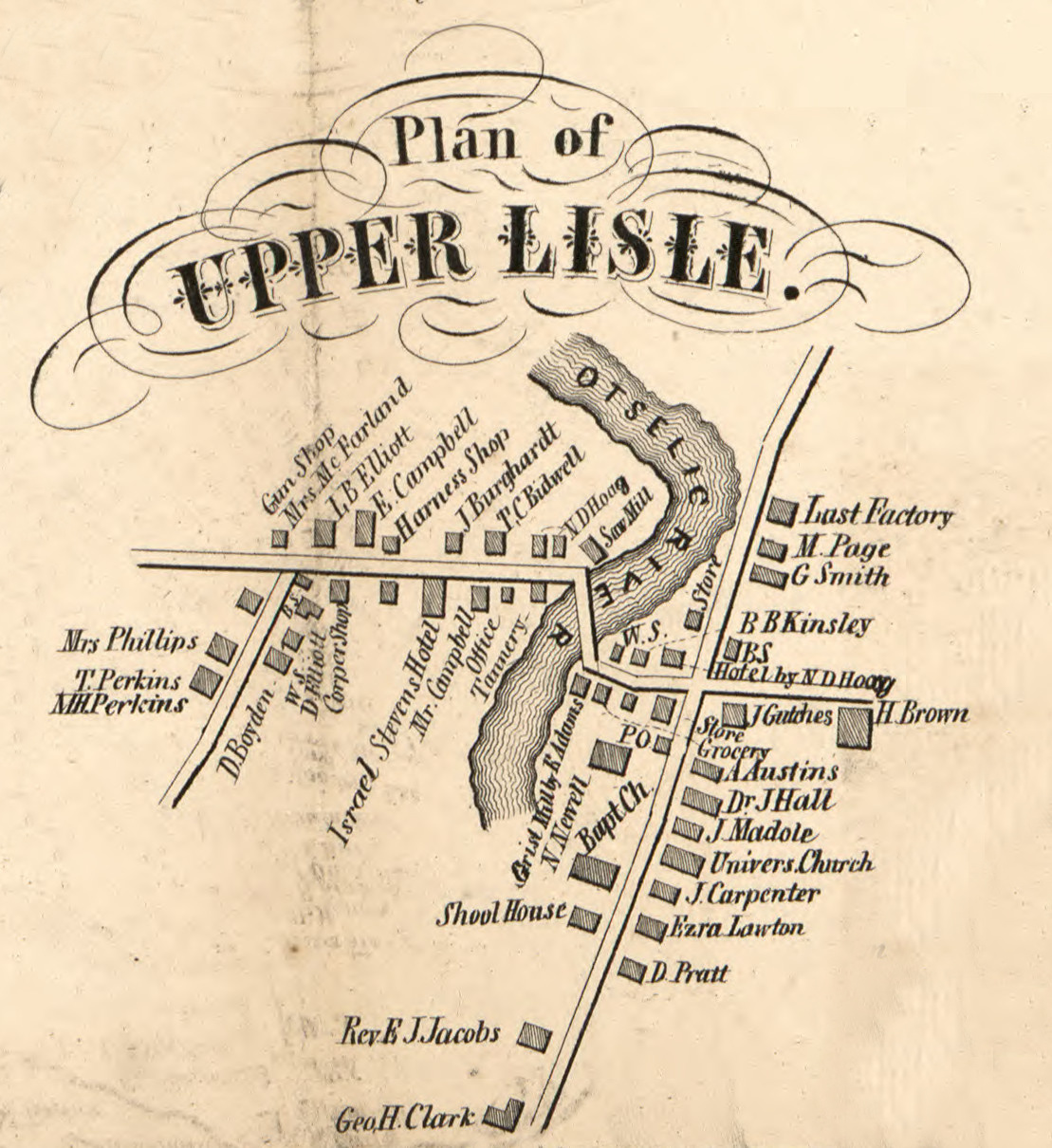
Plan of Upper Lisle (1855)

- Barnes Corners – A location in the northeastern part of the town, north of the hamlet of Triangle.
- Clough Corners – A hamlet near the northern town boundary on County Road 144.
- Hazzard Corners – A location east of Clough Corners.
- Page Brook – A stream flowing into Whitney Point Reservoir.
- Penelope – A location on the northern town line.
- Triangle – The hamlet of Triangle is in the southern part of the town on NY Route 206 at the junction of County Road 133.
- Upper Lisle – A hamlet at the northern end of the Whitney Point Reservoir on NY-26.
- Whitney Point – The village of Whitney Point is in the southwestern part of the town, by I-81 and US-11.
- Whitney Point Reservoir – An artificial lake on the western side of the town, formed on the Otselic River, a tributary of the Tioughnioga River.
