= Edmund B. Jenks =

American lawyer and politician (1863–1953)

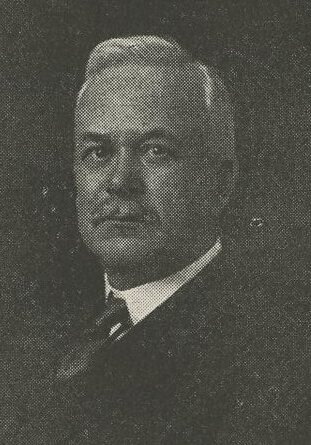

Member of the New York State Assembly from the Broome County (1st) district
- In office 1918–1932
- Preceded by: district created
- Succeeded by: Albert L. Brown

Member of the New York State Assembly from the Broome County district
- In office 1917–1917
- Preceded by: Simon P. Quick
- Succeeded by: district abolished

Personal details
- Born: Edmund Baker Jenks; March 16, 1863 Upper Lisle, New York, U.S.
- Died: February 10, 1953 (aged 89) Whitney Point, New York, U.S.
- Resting place: Upper Lisle Cemetery
- Party: Republican
- Spouse: Mary Catherine Johnson (m. 1896)
- Education: Cumberland University
- Occupation: Politician; lawyer

Edmund Baker Jenks (March 16, 1863 – February 10, 1953) was an American lawyer and politician from New York.

== Life ==
Jenks was born on March 16, 1863, in Upper Lisle, New York. He was the son of Sidney Hawkins Jenks, a shoemaker and farmer, and Polly Samantha Horton.

Initially, Jenks worked in civil engineering and land surveying. Later, he studied law at Cumberland University in Lebanon, Tennessee. He was admitted to the Tennessee state bar in 1896, and he practiced law in Fayetteville, Tennessee for a year. He returned to New York in 1897, was admitted to the New York bar in 1898, and began practicing law in Whitney Point, New York, where he worked as a trial lawyer. He was a member of the law firm Jenks & Glezen since 1923.

Jenks served as justice of the peace, police justice, village trustee, and president of the board of education for the Whitney Point high school. In 1916, he was elected to the New York State Assembly as a Republican, representing Broome County. He served in the Assembly in 1917, 1918, 1919, 1920, 1921, 1922, 1923, 1924, 1925, 1926, 1927, 1928, 1929, 1930, 1931, and 1932. He was a prominent supporter of Prohibition in the Assembly, introducing legislation every year starting in 1924 that would enforce state Prohibition. In 1920, he served on the Judiciary Committee that tried and expelled five Socialist assemblymen from the Assembly.

In 1896, Jenks married Mary Catherine Johnson. They had no children. He was an active member of the Freemasons. He was chairman of the Republican County Committee of Broome County and served as lawyer and director of the Broome County Agricultural Society.

Jenks died at his niece's home in Whitney Point on February 10, 1953. He was buried in Upper Lisle Cemetery.

New York State Assembly
Preceded by Simon P. Quick	New York State Assembly; Broome County; 1917	Succeeded by District Abolished
Preceded by District Created	New York State Assembly; Broome County, 1st District; 1918-1932	Succeeded by Albert L. Brown
