= Killawog, New York =

- Hamlet
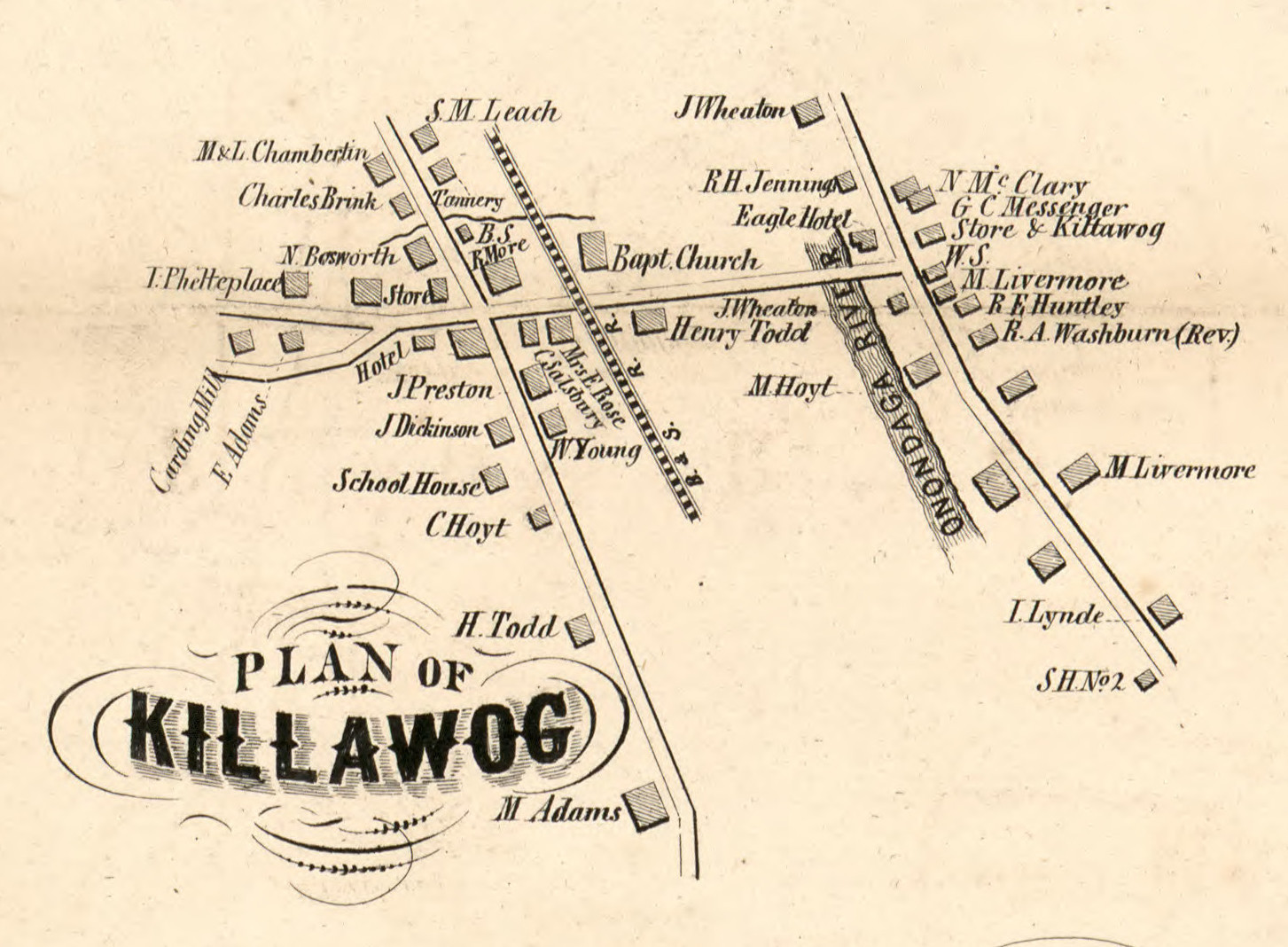
- Plan of Killawog (1855)

- Location within New York Location within the United States
- Coordinates: 42°24′02″N 76°01′15″W
- Country: United States
- State: New York
- County: Broome
- Town: Lisle
- Elevation: 1,007 ft (307 m)
- Time zone: UTC-5 (Eastern (EST))
  - Summer (DST): UTC-4 (EDT)
- ZIP code: 13794
- Area code: 607
- GNIS feature ID: 954605

Killawog is a hamlet within the town of Lisle in Broome County, New York, United States. The community is located along the Tioughnioga River and U.S. Route 11, 4 miles (6 km) north of Lisle village and 3 miles (5 km) south of Marathon. Killawog has a post office with ZIP code 13794.
