= Lisle, New York =

- Town
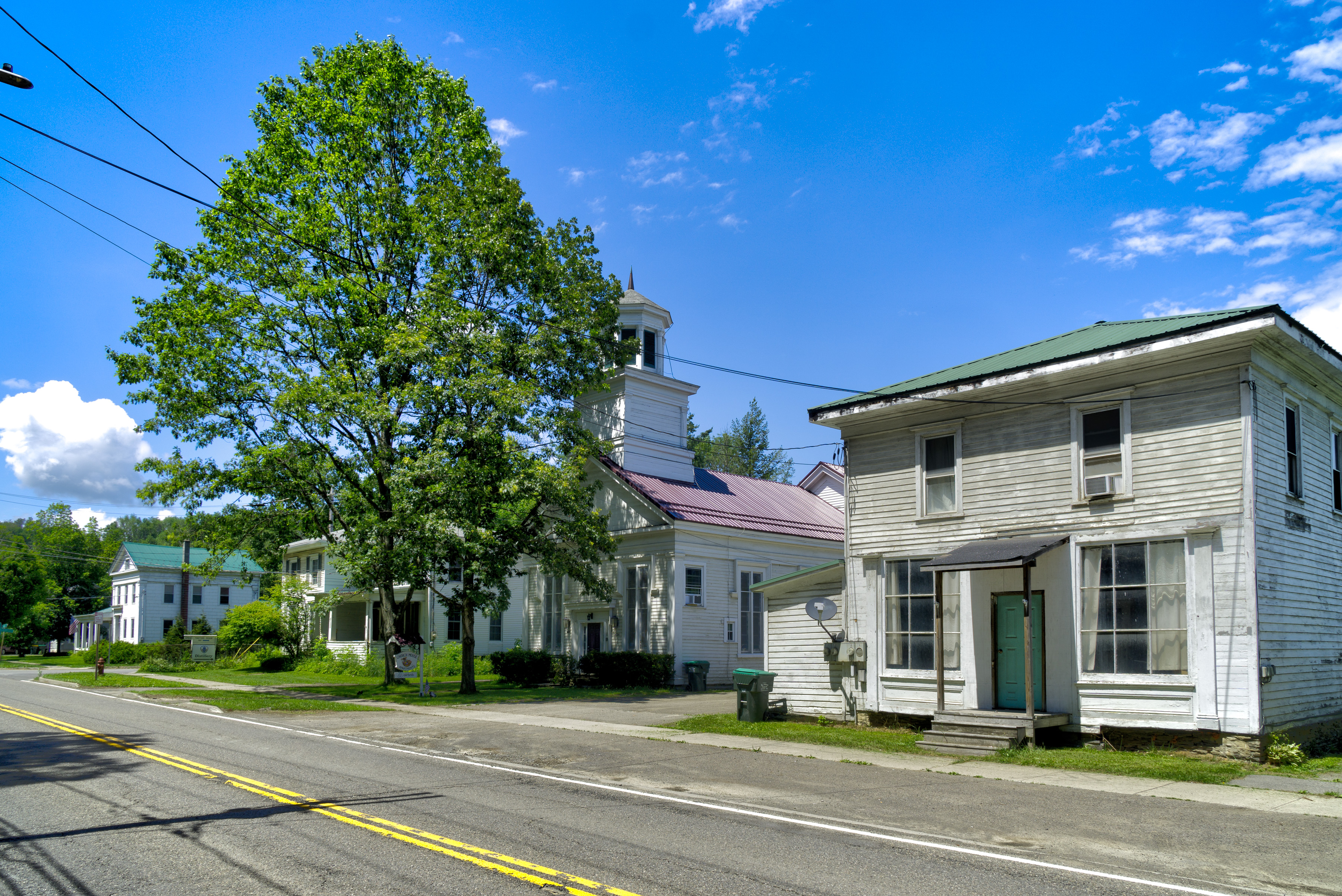
- Main Street

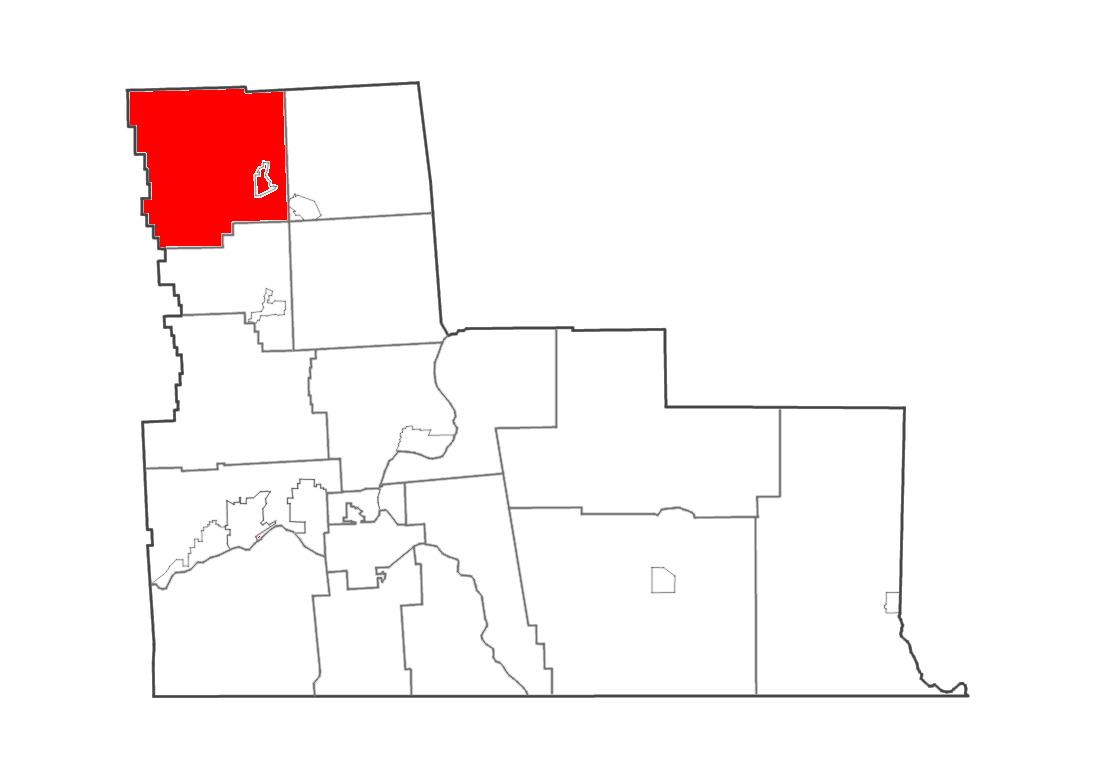
- Map highlighting Lisle's location within Broome County.

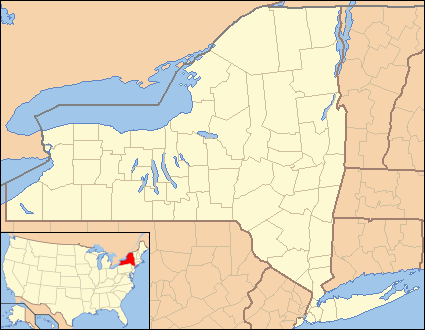
- Location within the state of New York
- Coordinates: 42°21′02″N 076°00′10″W
- Country: United States
- State: New York
- County: Broome

Government
  - Type: Town Council
  - Town Supervisor: Edward Gehm
  - Town Council: Members' List: • Ronald Manwaring; • Steve Livingston; • Scott Glezen; • Gordon Boyce

Area
  - Total: 46.98 sq mi (121.69 km^{2})
  - Land: 46.89 sq mi (121.45 km^{2})
  - Water: 0.089 sq mi (0.23 km^{2})

Population (2010)
  - Total: 2,751
  - Estimate (2016): 2,677
  - Density: 57.1/sq mi (22.04/km^{2})
- Time zone: UTC-5 (Eastern (EST))
  - Summer (DST): UTC-4 (EDT)
- ZIP Codes: 13797 (Lisle); 13736 (Berkshire); 13803 (Marathon); 13835 (Richford); 13862 (Whitney Point)
- FIPS code: 36-007-42653

Lisle is a town in Broome County, New York, United States. The population was 2,751 at the 2010 census.

The town is in the northwestern part of the county and is north of Binghamton. The town includes a village also named Lisle.

== History ==
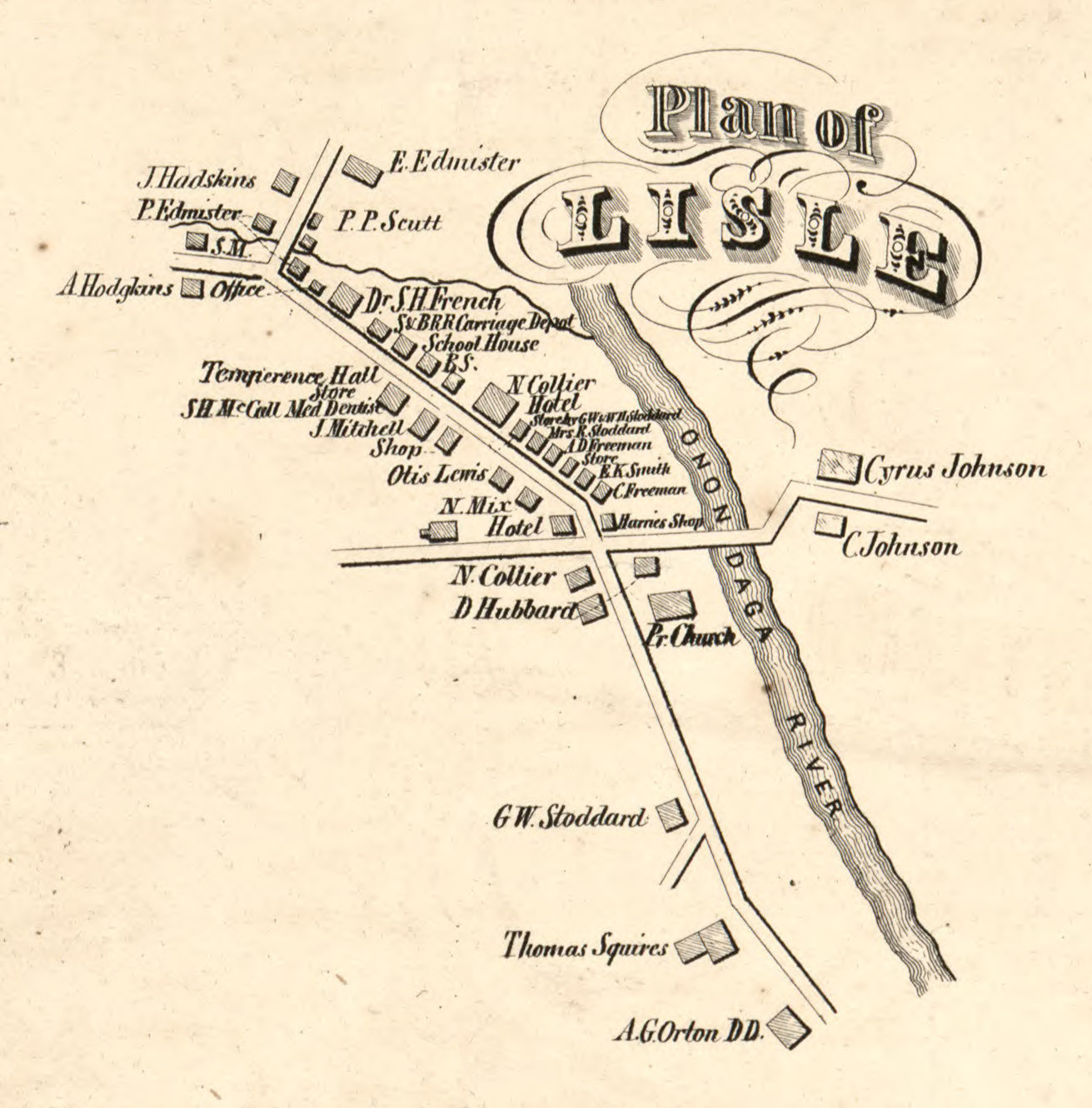
Plan of Lisle (1855)

The area that is now the town of Lisle was first settled around 1791. The town was formed from the town of Union in 1801. Later, parts of Lisle were used to form new towns in the county: in 1831, a division of Lisle into four parts created three new towns: Barker, Nanticoke, and Triangle.

John D. Rockefeller's birthplace is located northeast of Lisle by a few miles in Richford, New York and his relatives lived in Lisle. Rockefeller's father lived outside the morals of the Lisle community since he had two wives.

One reported original settlement, the Torry Lot, was located approximately within a one-mile radius of the hill on Hotaling's property (the first owner of a piece of the Boston Purchase). There apparently were some disputes with the local Indians, and Hotaling's son was killed by Indians. The original "Torry Lot" settlers burned their possessions and moved because their livestock died, and they deemed the area uninhabitable.

The first white settlers around 1791 included Josiah Patterson, Ebenezer Tracy, Edward Edwards, David Manning, Eliphalet Parsons and Whittlesey Gleason. By 1830, Lisle was "congested" and had a population of 4,393 - more than any other town in Broome County. Lisle was a shopping mecca, and the wares produced at the numerous mills were being sold in the thriving "Center Lisle" (originally called Yorkshire). Lisle in 1835 had considerable distinction as a manufacturing town, at that time having in operation three gristmills, twenty sawmills, one oil cloth mill, three fulling mills, three carding mills, one trip hammer or forging mill, three tanneries and two places where potash was made.

In January 1918, Florence B. Chauncey became the first woman in New York State to vote, at the Lisle Village Hall. A historical marker commemorating this event was erected at the Village Hall in 2018.

In 1915 a home for children, "Happy Valley Homes", was established in the town.

The flood of 1935 destroyed a large part of the town, and often items from the 1935 flood are still being discovered, and displayed at the Maple Festival (Marathon) every year. Within and near the village of Lisle, this type of turmoil is unlikely to happen again because of dike-building and other flood control work along the Tioughnioga River and tributaries, which was accomplished in conjunction with construction of the Whitney Point dam on the separate Otselic River watershed (authorized under the Flood Control Act of June 22, 1936).

Main Street

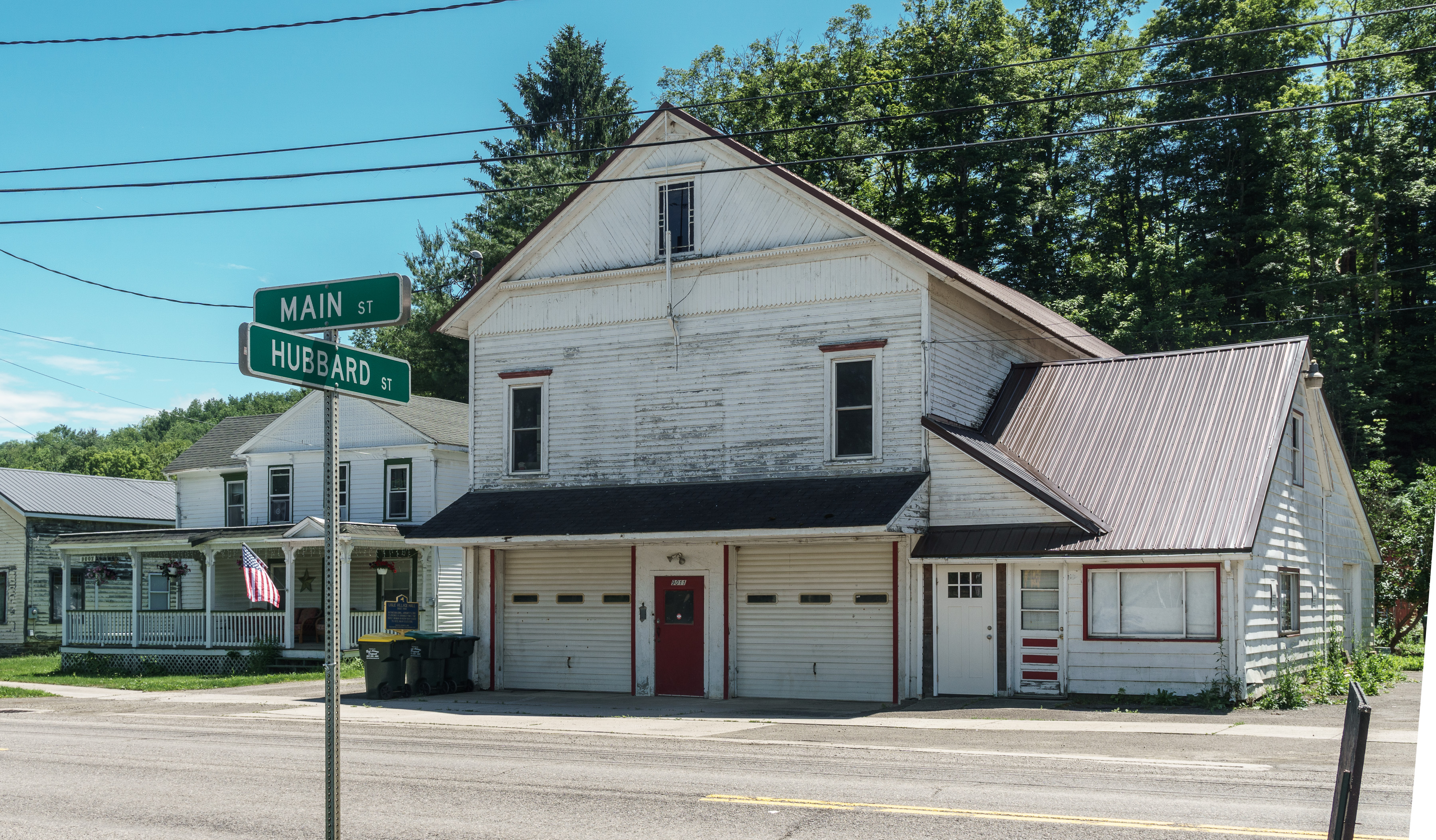
Village Hall

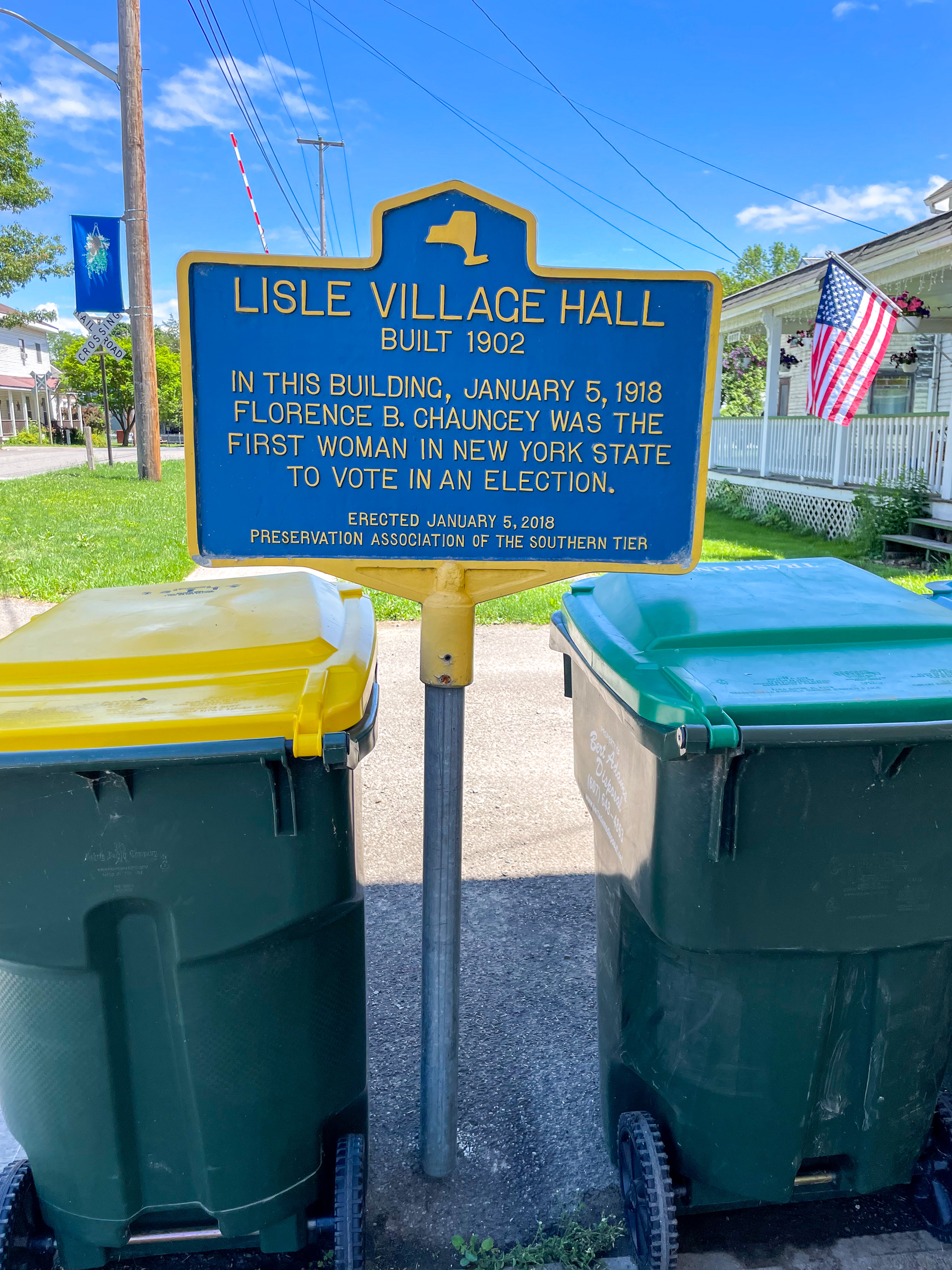
Marker

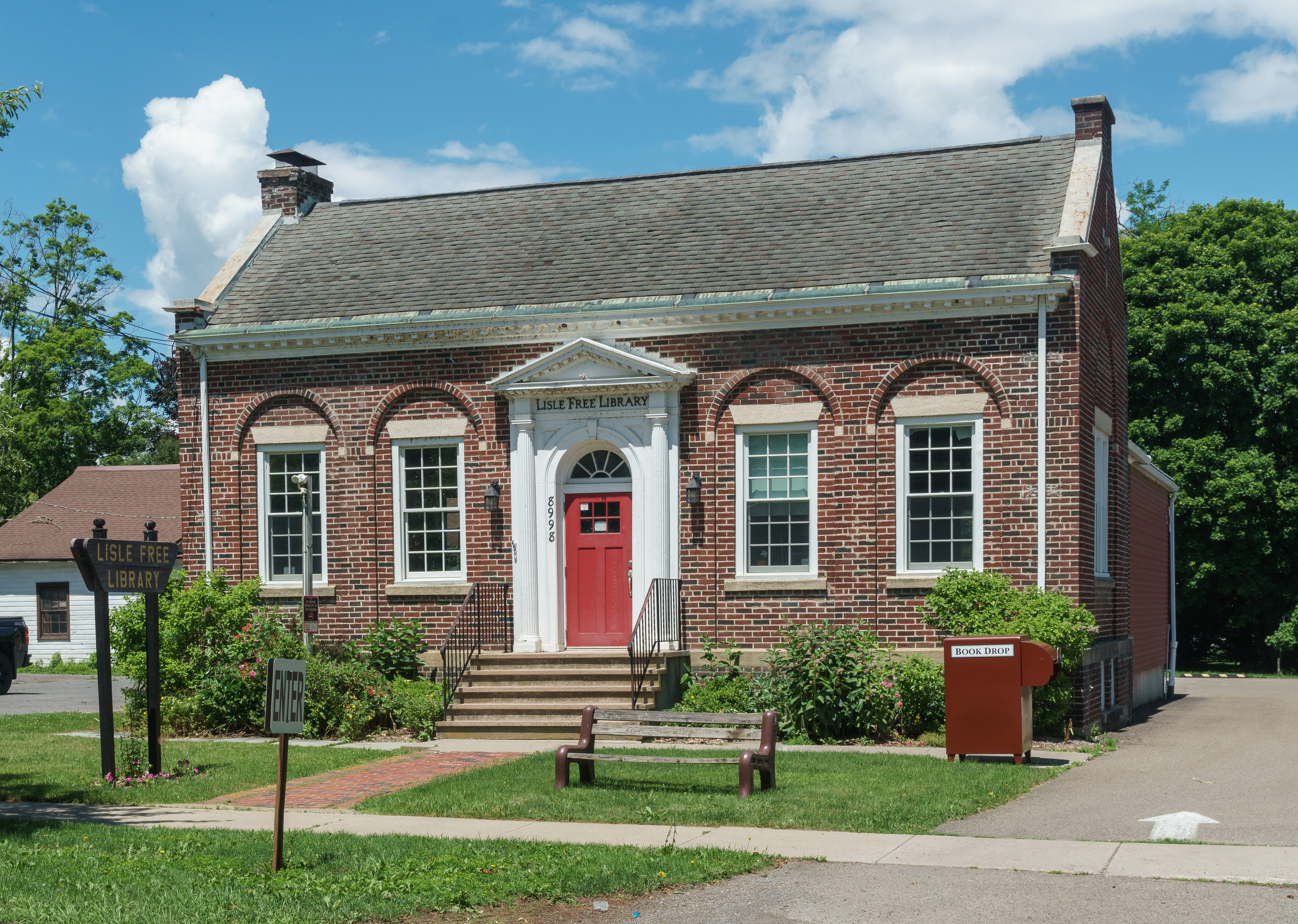
Lisle Free Library

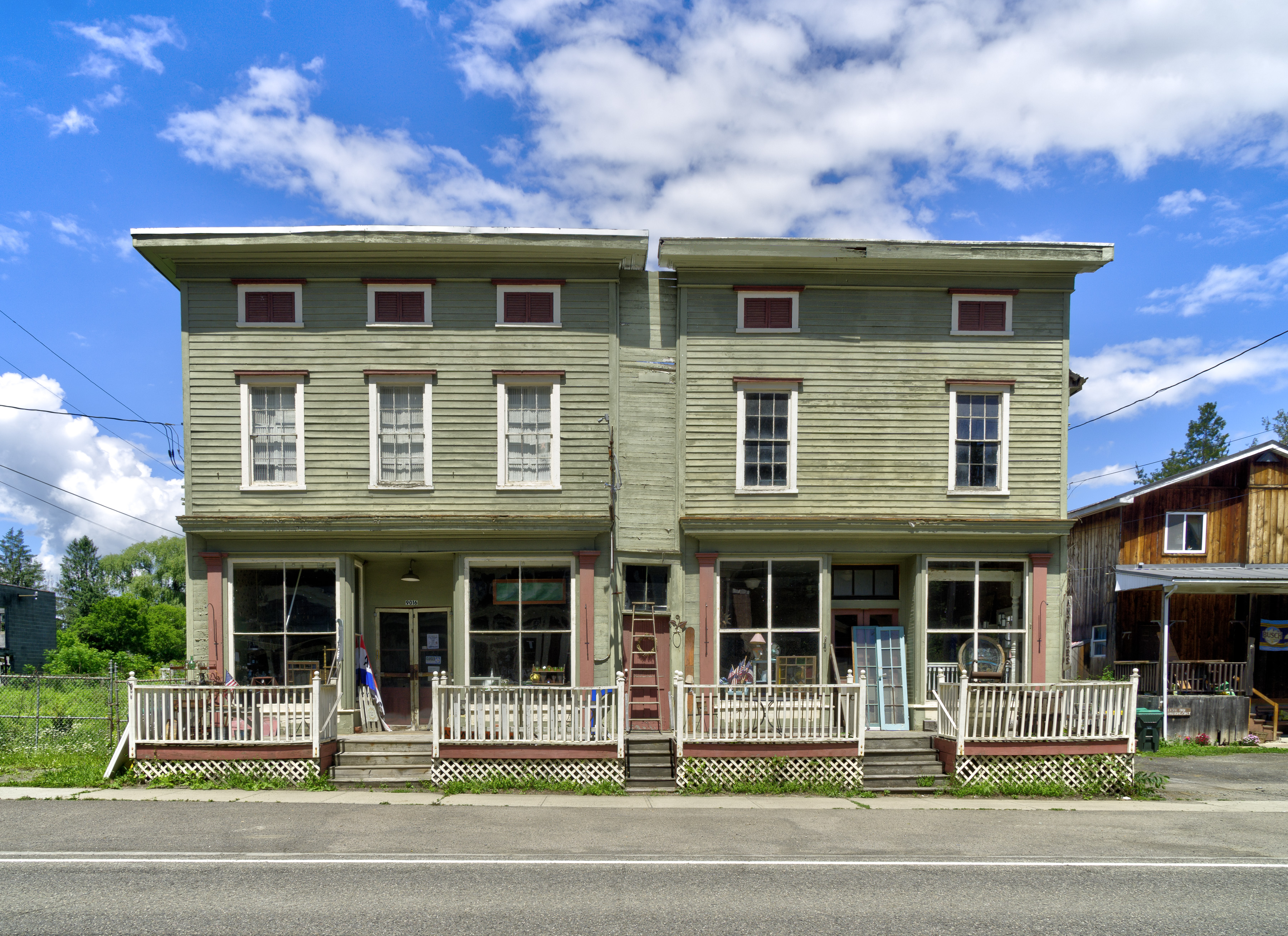
A duplex

The history of Lisle is marked by population decreases: the abandonment of the Torry Lot, the fall of the Lisle mills, the flood of 1935.

Today however, with the rediscovery of gas, the population is slightly increasing again.

== Geography ==
According to the United States Census Bureau, the town has a total area of 47.0 square miles (121.7 km^{2}), of which 46.9 square miles (121.5 km^{2}) is land and 0.08 square miles (0.2 km^{2}), or 0.19%, is water.

The northern town line is the border of Cortland County, and the western town line is the border of Tioga County.

The Tioughnioga River passes through the town, and Whitney Point Lake lies just east of the east town line. Interstate 81 and U.S. Route 11 pass north-south through the town. New York State Route 79 is an important east-west highway, and a small part of New York State Route 26 crosses the southeast corner of the town.

There is a naturally occurring artesian spring in Lisle.

== Demographics ==
Historical population
Census	Pop.	Note	%±
1820	3,083		—
1830	4,393		42.5%
1840	1,560		−64.5%
1850	1,680		7.7%
1860	1,791		6.6%
1870	2,525		41.0%
1880	2,399		−5.0%
1890	1,962		−18.2%
1900	1,710		−12.8%
1910	1,429		−16.4%
1920	1,219		−14.7%
1930	1,299		6.6%
1940	1,397		7.5%
1950	1,534		9.8%
1960	1,587		3.5%
1970	1,917		20.8%
1980	2,039		6.4%
1990	2,486		21.9%
2000	2,707		8.9%
2010	2,751		1.6%
2016 (est.)	2,677	▼	−2.7%
U.S. Decennial Census

As of the census of 2000, there were 2,707 people, 971 households, and 726 families residing in the town. The population density was 57.7 inhabitants per square mile (22.3/km^{2}). There were 1,083 housing units at an average density of 23.1 per square mile (8.9/km^{2}). The racial makeup of the town was 98.37% White, 0.44% Black or African American, 0.30% Native American, 0.04% Asian, 0.18% from other races, and 0.66% from two or more races. Hispanic or Latino of any race were 0.33% of the population.

There were 971 households, out of which 37.8% had children under the age of 18 living with them, 58.7% were married couples living together, 10.1% had a female householder with no husband present, and 25.2% were non-families. 20.1% of all households were made up of individuals, and 7.9% had someone living alone who was 65 years of age or older. The average household size was 2.79 and the average family size was 3.21.

In the town, the population was spread out, with 29.6% under the age of 18, 8.7% from 18 to 24, 30.1% from 25 to 44, 21.1% from 45 to 64, and 10.5% who were 65 years of age or older. The median age was 35 years. For every 100 females, there were 101.1 males. For every 100 females age 18 and over, there were 100.0 males.

The median income for a household in the town was $34,240, and the median income for a family was $37,639. Males had a median income of $26,445 versus $22,455 for females. The per capita income for the town was $14,359. About 11.5% of families and 15.0% of the population were below the poverty line, including 24.5% of those under age 18 and 2.4% of those age 65 or over.

== Communities and locations in the town of Lisle ==
- Center Lisle – A hamlet in the central part of the town on NY Route 79. It was formerly called "Yorkshire."
- Killawog – A hamlet in the northeast part of the town on County Road 156, adjacent to I-81. It was originally called "Union Village."
- Lisle – The village of Lisle is in the eastern part of the town.
- Manningsville – A hamlet on NY-79 in the southeast part of the town.

The hamlet of Upper Lisle is in the town of Triangle.

== See also ==
- Lisle, Illinois
- Lisle, Missouri
