= Otselic =

Otselic may refer to the following in the U.S. state of New York:

- Otselic, New York, a town in Chenango County
  - Otselic, a community in the above town
- Otselic River, a tributary of the Tioughnioga River
