= Tioughnioga =

Tioughnioga may refer to:

- Tioughnioga River, a tributary of the Chenango River, with two branches that converge at Cortland, New York, and flow south from there
- Givetian, also known as Tioughniogan or Tioughnioga stage, the middle stage of the Middle Devonian period
