= Lisle (village), New York =

Lisle, New York
- Village
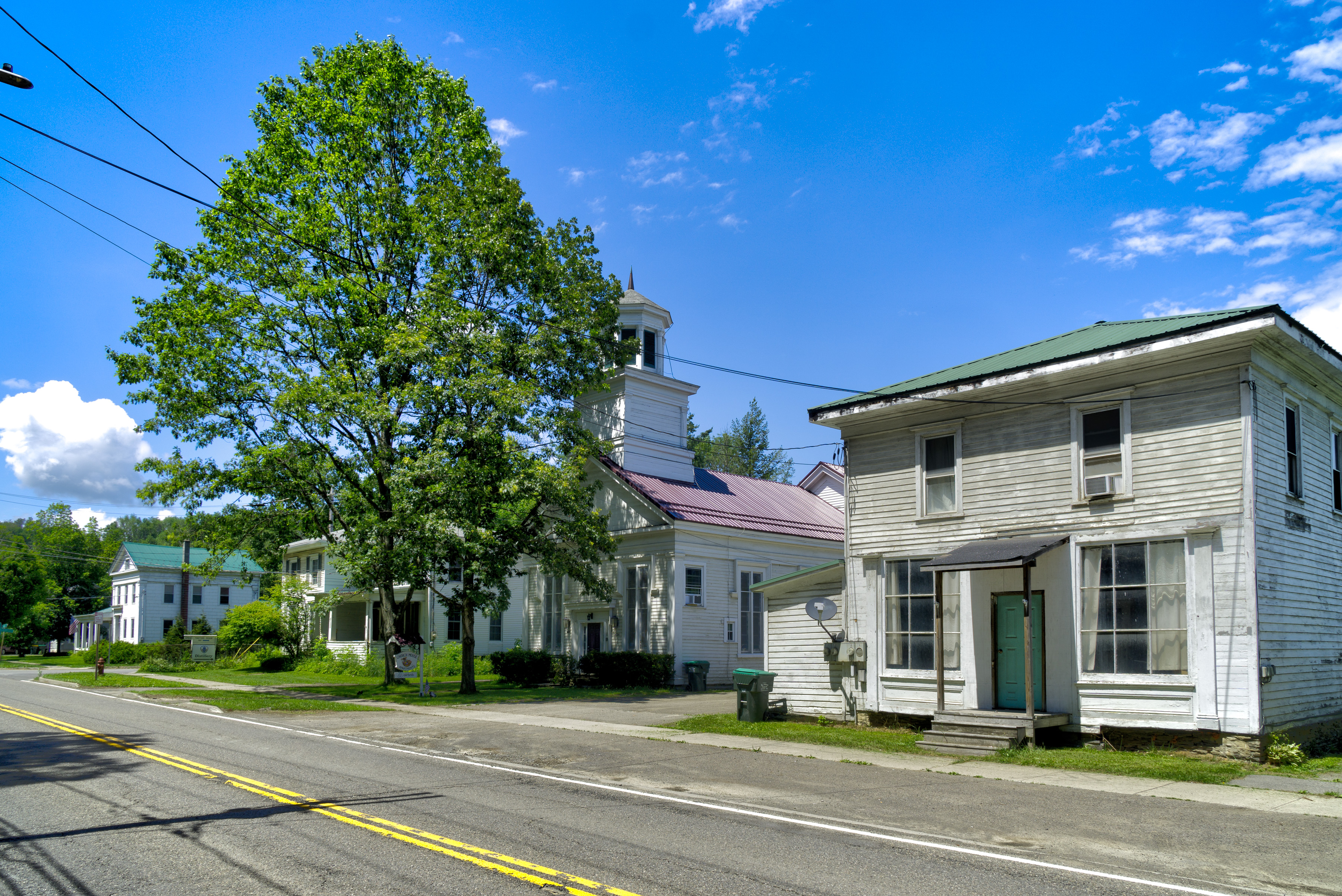
- Main Street

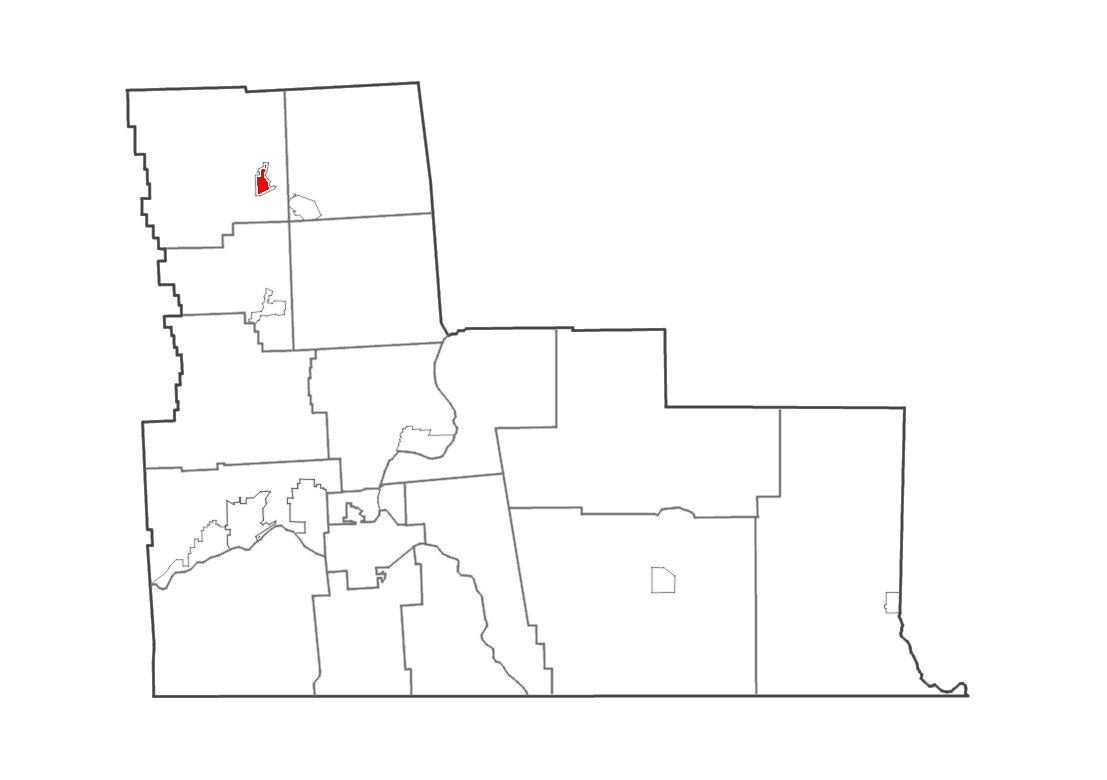
- Map highlighting Lisle's location within Broome County.

- Location within the state of New York
- Coordinates: 42°21′2″N 76°0′10″W
- Country: United States
- State: New York
- County: Broome
- Town: Lisle

Area
  - Total: 0.94 sq mi (2.43 km^{2})
  - Land: 0.94 sq mi (2.43 km^{2})
  - Water: 0 sq mi (0.00 km^{2})
- Elevation: 974 ft (297 m)

Population (2020)
  - Total: 348
  - Density: 371.6/sq mi (143.49/km^{2})
- Time zone: UTC-5 (Eastern (EST))
  - Summer (DST): UTC-4 (EDT)
- ZIP code: 13797
- Area code: 607
- FIPS code: 36-42642
- GNIS feature ID: 0955434

Lisle is a village in Broome County, New York, United States. The population was 348 at the 2020 census. It is part of the Binghamton Metropolitan Statistical Area. The village was named after a community in France. It was once called Onondaga.

The village of Lisle is in the southeast part of the town of Lisle and is north of Binghamton.

== History ==
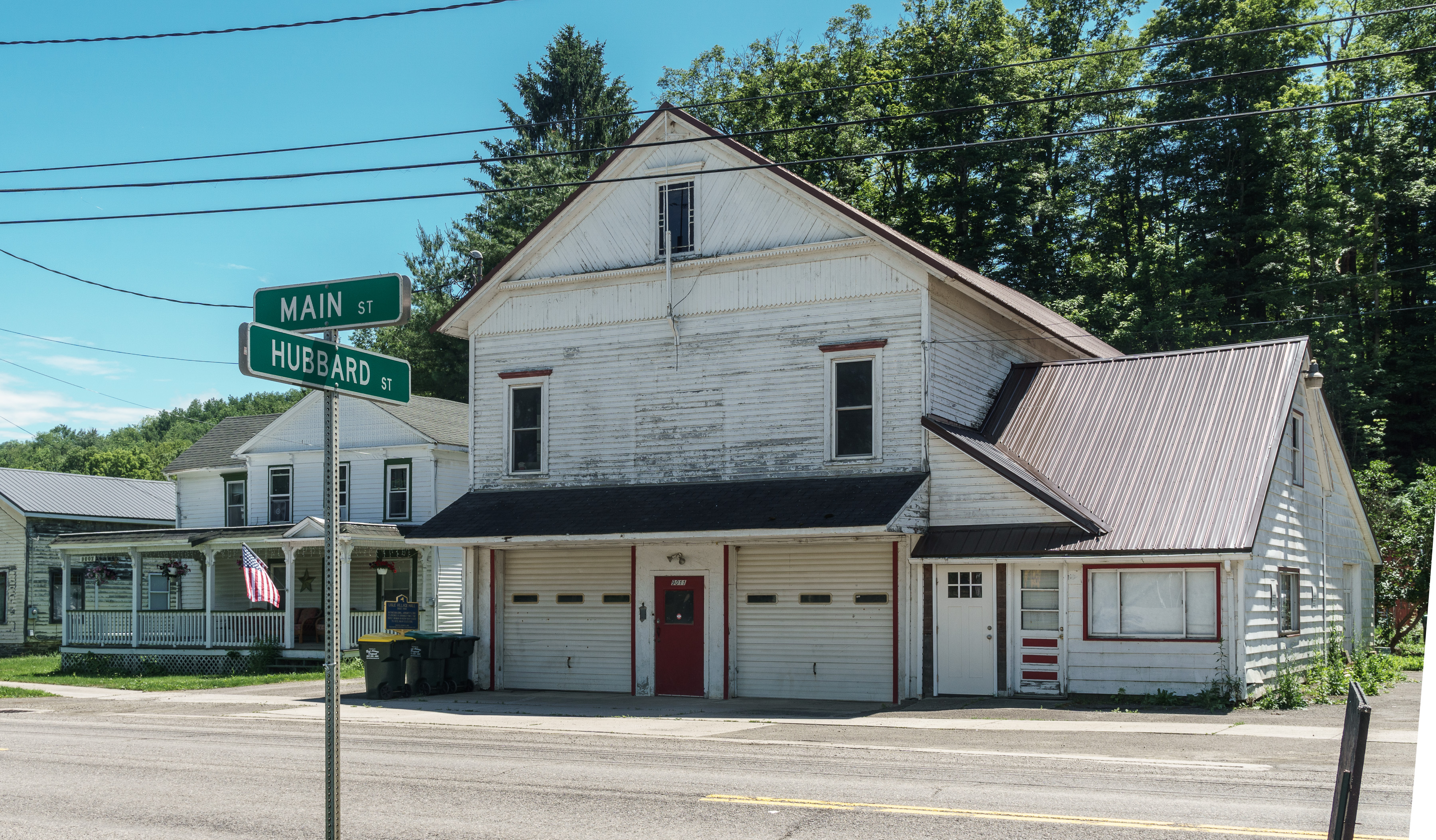
Village Hall

In 1791, the region which would become Lisle was settled by American Revolutionary Army veterans from Massachusetts. The settlers were members of the Boston Purchase (Boston Ten Townships) that bought 240,000 acres in what is now Broome County, from the State of Massachusetts, at a penny an acre. As part of this arrangement, settlers also had to pay the local Indian tribes another penny an acre. The first permanent settler was Ebenezer Tracy in 1793, who built his home near the present-day Lisle cemetery.

In its earliest days as a settlement, it is said of the land that "the hills were covered with forests, the rivers were well-fed, and much of the land swampy. On the eastern side of the river's edge one spring bubbled forth near the river's edge and flooded the surroundings to a condition of soft mud". The water from this spring carried various salts in solution, which tended to crystalize on the surrounding mud. Deer would be spotted coming to lick the salt crystals, which earned the village its first name of "Mud Lick". The settlers did not like the name, and set out to find a new one. Officers and veterans who had served under General Lafayette in the Revolutionary War decided to honor their general by renaming "Mud Lick" after his home town in France, Lisle .

Some of the first settlers were Major Solomon Owens and the families of "Squire, Howland, Edwards, Edminsters, Freeman, French, Burghardt, Osborns, Lewis, Orton, McDowell, Collier, Hubbards, Sparrows, Benedict, Johnson, Clark, and Franklin". Early Lisle was a place of great activity, with grist mills, tanneries, lumber companies, blacksmith shops, a gun factory, cigar factory, and a shoe factory being established. Soon, Grocery stores, drug stores, creameries, millinery stores, and a crude school sprang up in the village. It is said of early Lisle that "one could get in the village all needed articles". The new settlers established a Library and a congregational church by 1795, which is locally claimed to be the "first church west of the Catskills". The church had great authority over its members, who were severely reprimanded if they disobeyed its laws. Lisle's population grew rapidly, progressing to 600 inhabitants by 1800. Lisle's first post office was established in 1802, with Simeon Rogers acting as its post-master.

In 1866, the village of Lisle is officially incorporated.

The original school built by the settlers shortly after they arrived was replaced by the Lisle Academy in 1868. The new school became known in the area, with many of its students coming in from neighboring regions and boarding with local families while attending.

In May 1871 Gilbert A. Dodge founded the Lisle Gleaner, the first newspaper published in the village.

In 1914, the Lisle Village Improvement Society was founded. The Lisle Village Improvement society ran a public library throughout the early 1900's, which replaced the original Library that closed in 1839 due to no taxes being paid towards it. In 1925, the Village Improvement Society handed over their collection of books to the newly constructed Lisle Free Library. The library was built and donated by Herbert H. Franklin, manufacturer of the Franklin Motorcar, in honor of his father, Charles Risden Franklin.

In 1915, Richard Edwards and his wife, Anne, in memory of their daughter, Elizabeth Ann Edwards, founded the Happy Valley Home for boys and girls. The home would later be sold to the Lisle Christian Conference Center in 1945, who owned it until 1977. The home is currently a private residence.

On January 5, 1918, Florence B. Chauncey became the first woman in New York State to vote, at the Lisle Village Hall. A historical marker commemorating this event was erected at the village hall in 2018. The vote considered whether or not to allow alcohol to be continued to be sold in the town. Among its opponents were tavern owners like O. A. Burtis, the owner of local Dudley Hotel and Bar who said "I challenge the vote of every woman in here". Opponents such as him antagonized women's suffrage because they expected the women to vote against the sale of alcohol. Chauncey had placed her historic vote at 6:10 AM that day, followed shortly by 244 other women. All 255 votes were in support of outlawing alcohol sales. The President of the Village Improvement Society R. H. Edwards was one of the women who cast a vote that day, saying: "we, as representative women of the town of Lisle, are willing and eager to express our satisfaction in being the first of our sex to cast the ballot in New York State".

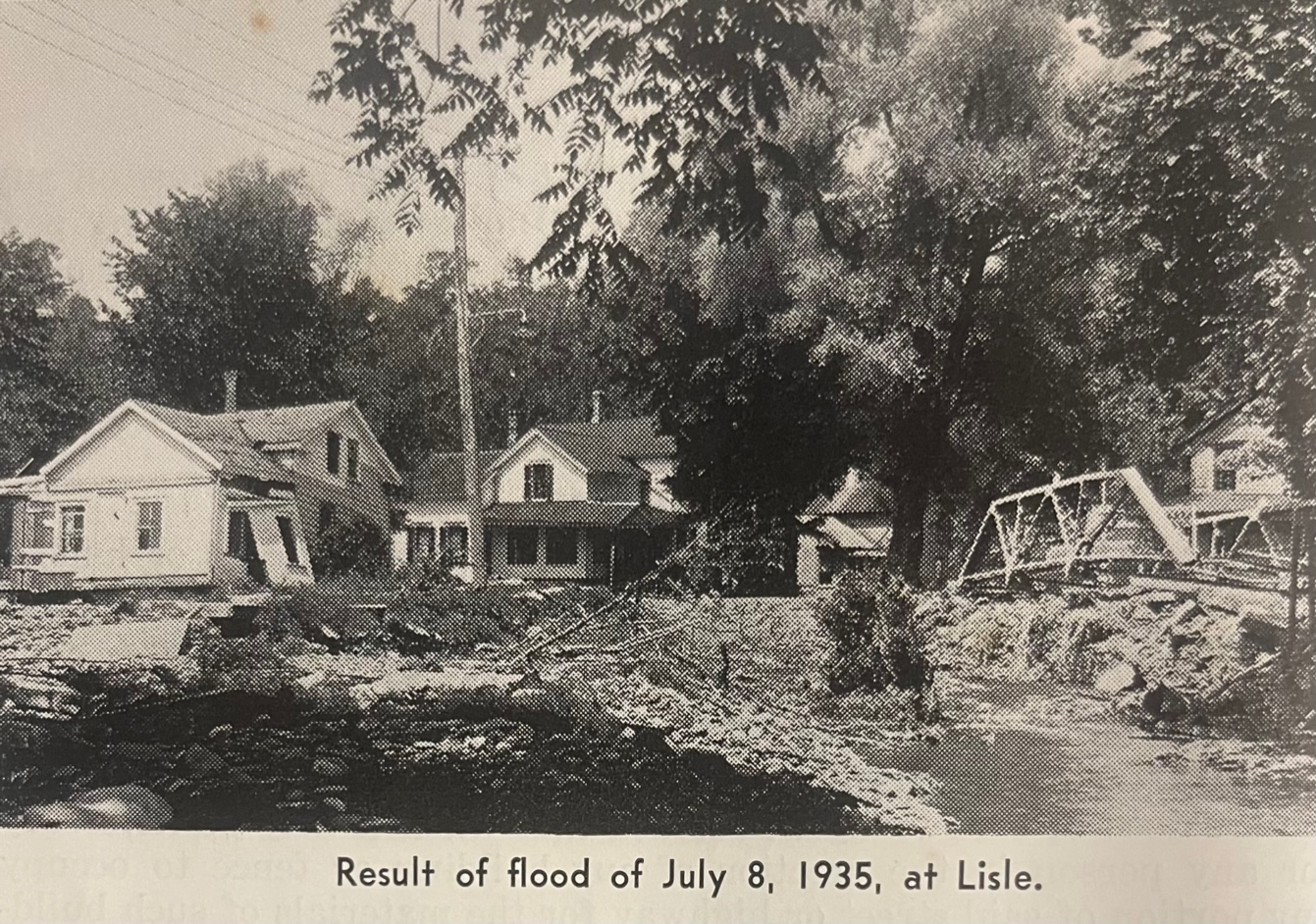
Photo depicting result of July 8, 1935, flood at Lisle.

In 1926, the village bank was looted, but the robbers were caught.

Lisle was known to have always been prone to flooding, with several bridges and sidewalks allegedly being washed away from 1793-1934. In 1935 a major flood ravaged Lisle, which prompted the development of flood protection for the village. This involved the demolition of bridges, addition of streets, and the construction of dikes around danger spots.

Lisle's progress calmed down by 1965, with many of its businesses and factories closing down. Much of Lisle's infrastructure, including its passenger train service and telegram station, shut down permanently around this time. Despite this, Lisle's Library remained open, which provided it a great advantage over other New York State villages.

== Geography ==
According to the United States Census Bureau, the village has a total area of 0.93 square miles (2.4 km^{2}), all land.

Lisle is known for its hills, which vary in height from 400 to 700 feet.

The Tioughnioga River (called the Onondaga on some maps) forms the eastern boundary of the village. It is a tributary of the Susquehanna River.

The village is on New York State Route 79 west of U.S. Route 11 and Interstate 81, and is located one mile north of the larger village of Whitney Point.

== Demographics ==
Historical population
Census	Pop.	Note	%±
1880	429		—
1890	421		−1.9%
1900	392		−6.9%
1910	329		−16.1%
1920	294		−10.6%
1930	325		10.5%
1940	342		5.2%
1950	300		−12.3%
1960	335		11.7%
1970	336		0.3%
1980	357		6.3%
1990	361		1.1%
2000	302		−16.3%
2010	320		6.0%
2020	348		8.8%
U.S. Decennial Census

As of the census of 2000, there were 302 people, 116 households, and 75 families residing in the village. The population density was 325.5 inhabitants per square mile (125.7/km^{2}). There were 135 housing units at an average density of 145.5 per square mile (56.2/km^{2}). The racial makeup of the village was 98.34% White, 0.66% Black or African American, 0.99% from other races. Hispanic or Latino of any race were 0.99% of the population.

There were 116 households, out of which 33.6% had children under the age of 18 living with them, 49.1% were married couples living together, 12.9% had a female householder with no husband present, and 34.5% were non-families. 30.2% of all households were made up of individuals, and 19.0% had someone living alone who was 65 years of age or older. The average household size was 2.60 and the average family size was 3.30.

In the village, the population was spread out, with 26.8% under the age of 18, 8.6% from 18 to 24, 28.8% from 25 to 44, 17.9% from 45 to 64, and 17.9% who were 65 years of age or older. The median age was 36 years. For every 100 females, there were 91.1 males. For every 100 females age 18 and over, there were 87.3 males.

The median income for a household in the village was $33,750, and the median income for a family was $45,625. Males had a median income of $31,797 versus $26,250 for females. The per capita income for the village was $14,685. About 10.7% of families and 12.6% of the population were below the poverty line, including 18.5% of those under the age of eighteen and 5.4% of those 65 or over.

== Notable person ==
- Thomas J. Paterson (1805–1885), US congressman
