= Simon P. Quick =

American politician (1850–1927)

Member of the New York State Assembly from the Broome County district
- In office 1914–1916
- Preceded by: Mortimer B. Edwards
- Succeeded by: Edmund B. Jenks

Personal details
- Born: Simon Peter Quick; June 27, 1850 Rochester, Ulster County, New York, U.S.
- Died: August 27, 1927 (aged 77)
- Resting place: Riverside Cemetery; Windsor, New York, U.S.
- Party: Republican
- Spouse: Polly A. Bowen (m. 1871)
- Children: 2
- Occupation: Politician; lumberman; hotelier

Simon Peter Quick (June 27, 1850 – August 27, 1927) was an American lumberman, hotelier, and politician from New York.

== Life ==
Quick was born on June 27, 1850, in Rochester, Ulster County, New York, the son of James Quick and Jane Wheeler. His father travelled west in 1862 on a prospecting tour only to die on the tour, leaving the twelve-year-old Quick (the eldest child) as the main provider for his mother and younger siblings.

Quick spent seven seasons working on the Delaware and Hudson Canal. He moved to Long Eddy in 1866, later moving to Scott Township, Wayne County, Pennsylvania. In 1869, he bought around fifty-five acres of farm and woodland near Hale Eddy and Scott Township. In 1878, he bought a large tract of heavily timbered land in Windsor and Colesville in Broome County, New York, with the land in Colesville covering five hundred and fifty acres. He settled in Colesville and worked as a lumber manufacturer and dealer, building a steam saw mill, houses for his workmen, and barns for his stocks. At one point, he was identified with the lumber firm Waite, Quick & Atwell and was a partner in the mercantile house of John Davis & Company of Tioga County, Pennsylvania. In 1890, he moved to the village of Windsor and, in addition to his lumber and other interests, became the owner and proprietor of the Eagle Hotel. After enlarging and improving the Hotel, he gave the hotel to an experienced manager to focus on his lumber business. He had two mills, one in the town of Windsor and the other in Mount Pleasant, Pennsylvania. In 1909, Governor Charles Evans Hughes appointed him Commissioner of Prisons. He was reappointed to a second term and resigned as Commissioner in 1913. He also served on the Niagara Water Committee for several years.

In 1913, Quick was elected to the New York State Assembly as a Republican, representing Broome County. He served in the Assembly in 1914, 1915, and 1916.

Quick was a member of the Freemasons, the Knights Templar, the Shriners, the Royal Arch Masonry. He was a grand master of the Independent Order of Odd Fellows. In 1871, he married Polly A. Bowen. They adopted two children, Bird Alice Bunting and Bernice Bowen.

Quick died at home from a heart attack on August 27, 1927. He was buried in Riverside Cemetery in Windsor.

New York State Assembly
Preceded by Mortimer B. Edwards	New York State Assembly; Broome County; 1914–1916	Succeeded by Edmund B. Jenks
