= Grace Episcopal Church (Whitney Point, New York) =

Historic church in New York, United States

- U.S. National Register of Historic Places
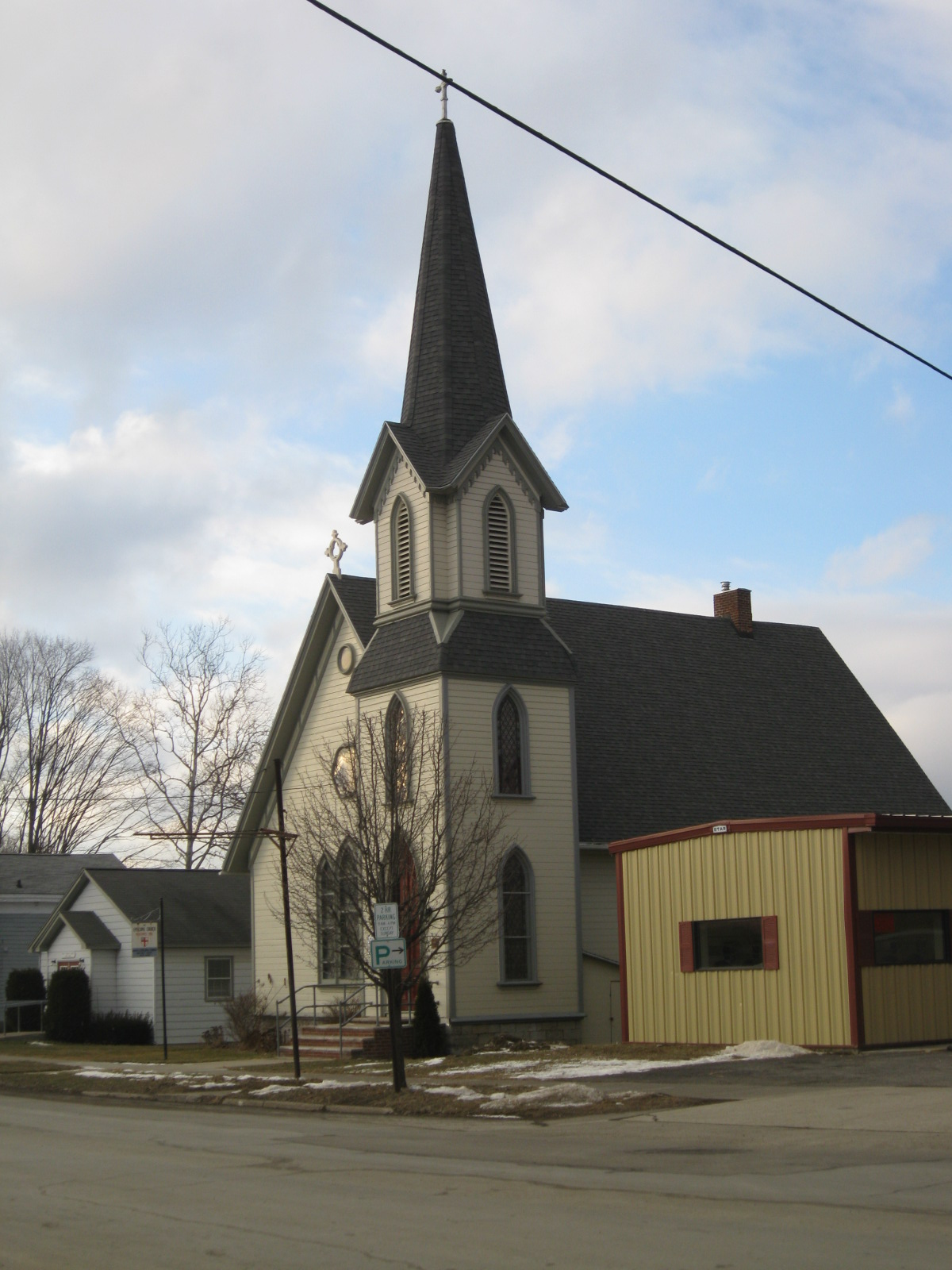
- Grace Episcopal Church, February 2010

- Location within New York Location within the United States
- Location: 2624 Main St., Whitney Point, New York
- Coordinates: 42°19′45″N 75°58′7″W
- Area: less than one acre
- Built: 1871
- Architect: Greene, J.I. & Son
- Architectural style: Gothic
- MPS: Historic Churches of the Episcopal Diocese of Central New York MPS
- NRHP reference No.: 98001113
- Added to NRHP: August 28, 1998

Grace Episcopal Church is a historic Episcopal church located at Whitney Point in Broome County, New York. It is a small wood-framed church constructed in 1871 in the High Victorian Gothic style. It features a three-stage entrance tower surmounted by a spire and small wooden cross.

It was listed on the National Register of Historic Places in 1998.

A final service was held at the church on April 6, 2013.
