= Whitney Point Reservoir =

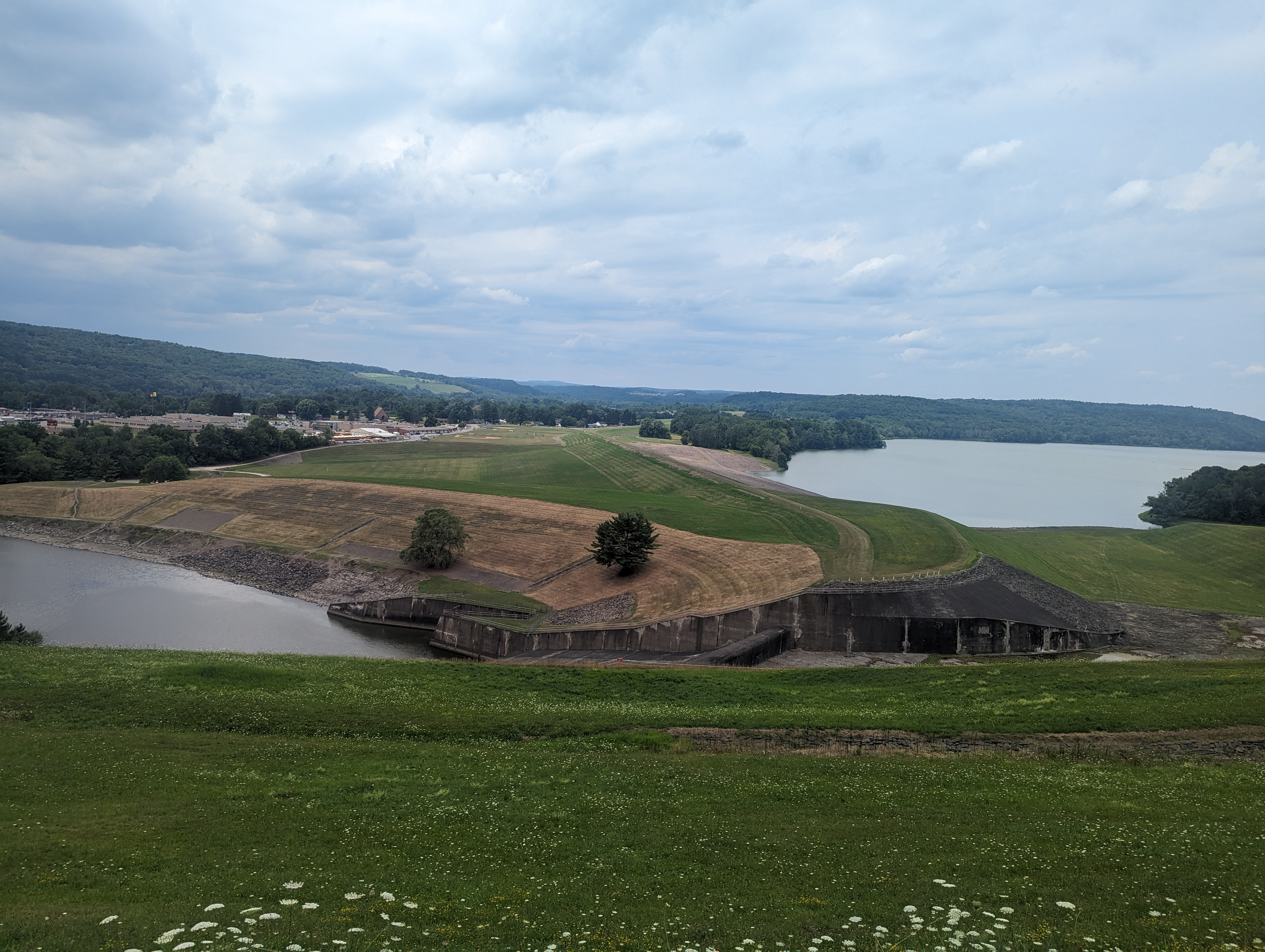
- Whitney Point Reservoir and the Whitney Point Dam

- Location within New York Location within the United States
- Location: Broome County, New York, United States
- Coordinates: 42°20′21″N 75°57′54″W
- Type: Reservoir
- Primary inflows: Otselic River
- Primary outflows: Otselic River
- Basin countries: United States
- Surface area: 3,168 acres (12.82 km^{2})
- Average depth: 6 feet (1.8 m)
- Max. depth: 20 ft (6.1 m)
- Shore length^{1}: 41 miles (66 km)
- Surface elevation: 1,010 ft (310 m)
- Settlements: Whitney Point, New York
- ^{1} Shore length is not a well-defined measure.

Whitney Point Reservoir is a man-made lake located by Whitney Point, New York. Fish species present in the lake include largemouth bass, smallmouth bass, walleye, northern pike, tiger muskie, yellow perch, pickerel, and pumpkinseed sunfish. There is access via state owned gravel ramp boat launch off County Route 13. There is also a state owned hard surface ramp off NY-26 in Dorchester Park. Fishing and boating are prohibited within 400 feet of the inlet and outlet. Motors up to 25 horsepower are permitted. There is a 10-mile per hour speed limit. Water-skiing, overnight mooring or beaching are not permitted.
