= Otselic River =

River in New York, U.S.

- Location of the mouth of the Otselic River Otselic River (the United States)

Location
- Country: United States
- State: New York
- Region: Central New York Region
- Counties: Madison, Chenango, Cortland, Broome

Physical characteristics
- Source
  - coordinates: 42°50′44″N 75°46′33″W
- Mouth: Tioughnioga River
  - location: Whitney Point
  - coordinates: 42°19′50″N 75°57′56″W
  - elevation: 938 ft (286 m)
- Length: 55.4 miles (89.2 km)

Basin features
- Tributaries
  - right: Merrill Creek

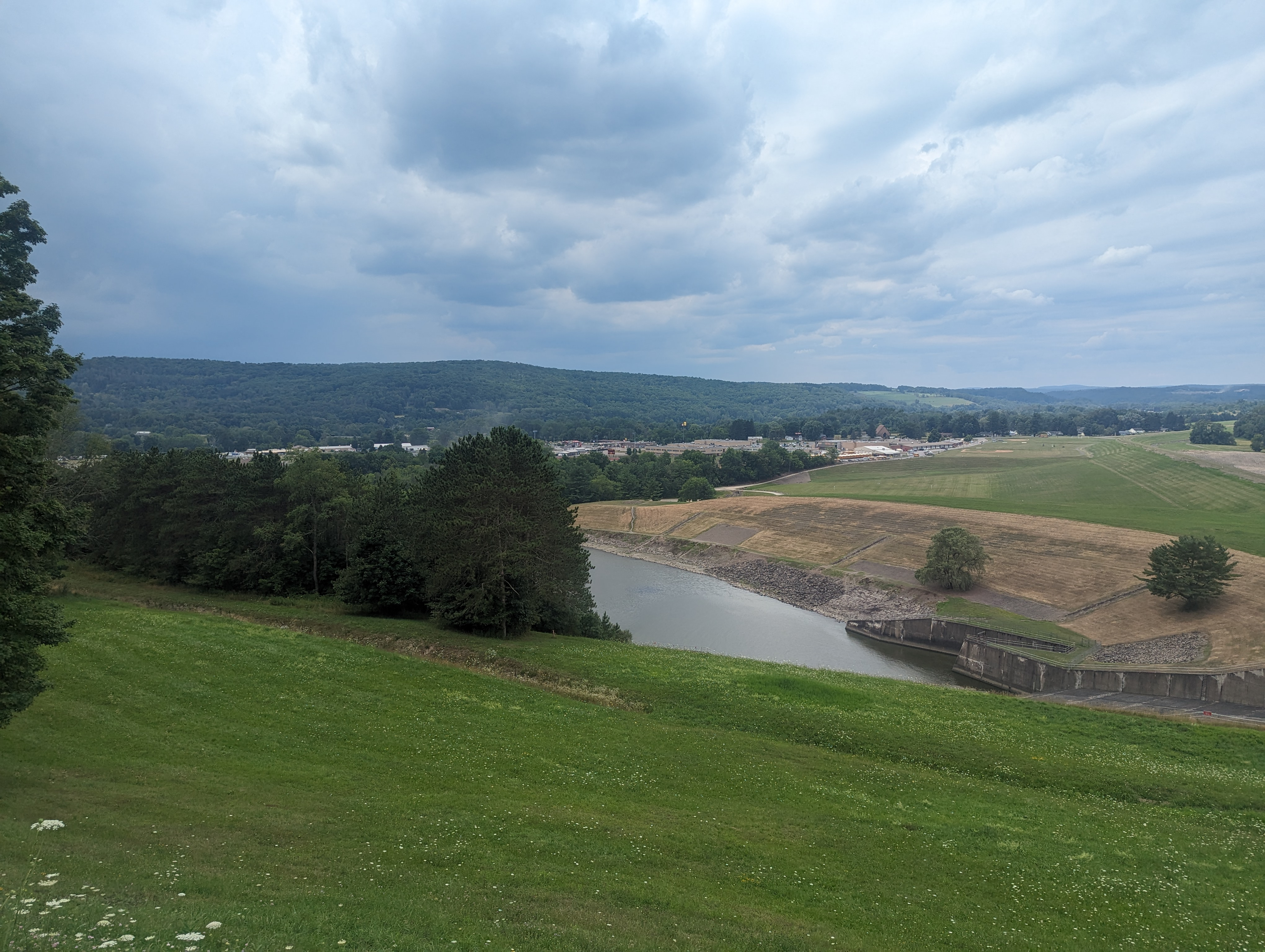
Otselic River downstream of the Whitney Point Dam

The Otselic River (aht-SEEL-ik), formerly known as Otselic Creek, is a 55.4-mile-long (89.2 km) tributary of the Tioughnioga River in central New York in the United States. It drains a hilly area, mostly forested and agricultural, east of the Finger Lakes at the northern edge of the Susquehanna River watershed.

Originally the Otselic Creek began at Hatch Lake in the Town of Eaton. When Hatch Lake was dammed in the 1830s to supply the Chenango Canal, all the lake water was diverted to the Chenango Valley to the east. The Otselic River now rises in Torpy Pond in southwestern Madison County, northeast of Georgetown, and meanders southwest through rich river bottom farmland. The Otselic Valley runs through Georgetown, Otselic, Pitcher, Cincinnatus, Willet, Lisle, and Whitney Point, where it is impounded to form Whitney Point Reservoir. Below the Whitney Point Dam, the Otselic River joins the Tioughnioga River from the northeast.

Formerly, several "mill ditches" diverted the river water to mills in the town of Otselic. One such present diversion is a dam above the hamlet of South Otselic which originally supplied a mill in the hamlet of South Otselic and later was piped to supply the present New York State South Otselic Fish Hatchery.

The Otselic River holds both native brook trout and stocked brown trout in the upper reaches and warmer water species such as smallmouth bass, walleyes and northern pike in the lower southern sections. Before the Otselic River was dammed in 1942 to form the Whitney Point Reservoir, eels and shad migrated up the Otselic River from the Susquehanna River.

== See also ==
- List of New York rivers
