= Tioughnioga River =

Tioughnioga River Tiohujodha, Onondaga
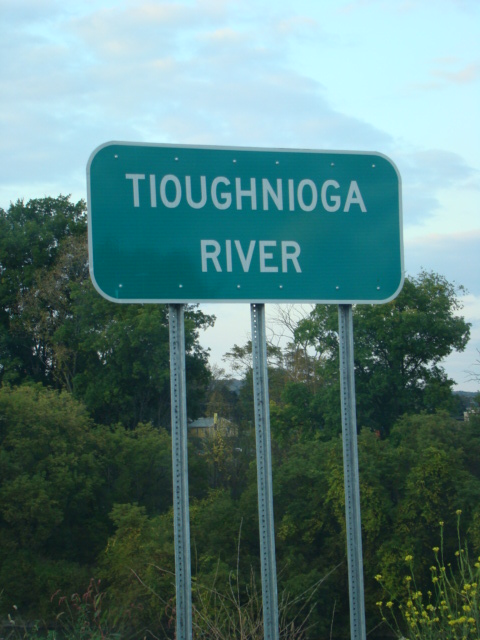
- Native name: Ti-ough'-ni'-o-ga (Onondaga); Tiohujodha (Munsee)

Location
- Country: United States
- State: New York
- County: Cortland, Broome County, New York

Physical characteristics
- Source: East Branch Tioughnioga, West Branch Tioughnioga
  - location: Cortland, New York
  - coordinates: 42°36′15″N 76°09′32″W
- Mouth: Chenango River
  - location: Chenango Forks, New York
  - coordinates: 42°14′12″N 75°50′35″W
  - elevation: 879 ft (268 m)
- Length: 34 mi (55 km)

The Tioughnioga River (/taɪ.əˈnoʊɡə/) is a 34.2-mile-long (55.0 km) tributary of the Chenango River in central New York in the United States. It drains a dissected plateau area east of the Finger Lakes at the northernmost edge of the watershed of the Susquehanna River.

The name comes from a native word for "forks of the river" or "meeting of waters". The river was also called "Tiohujodha" by the Moravian Indians. At one time it was called the Onondaga, as leading to that town, and Teyoghagoga was another early form.

It rises in two branches in upstate New York southeast of the city of Syracuse, with the East Branch sometimes regarded as the main branch. The West Branch, 15.6 miles (25.1 km) long, issues from Tully Lake, approximately 2 miles (3 km) south of Tully on the Onondaga-Cortland county line, and flows south.

The Tully Valley is a preglacial valley of a northward flowing river that flowed into the Ontarian River (preglacial Lake Ontario). Near Tully, during the glacial retreat, the valley was dammed by ice to form a lake. For a period of time the retreating of the front by melting matched the forward movement of the glacier, so that the captured rock, gravel and sand was deposited into the lake. This huge quantity of material approximately half filled the valley, and reversed the flow direction to the southward. It left enormous quantities of gravel from Tully to Cortland, some of which was used as building material for Interstate 81. The gravel also forms a major aquifer for the area. Tully Lake is a glacial kettle, being formed by a large chunk of ice that was buried in the glacial debris. As the ice melted the land collapsed, causing a lake to form.

The East (main) Branch, 21.4 miles (34.4 km) long, rises in northeastern Cortland County at the confluence of Tioughnioga Creek and the West Branch Tioughnioga Creek. The East Branch flows southwest, receiving the West Branch at Cortland.

The Tioughnioga River then flows south-southeast, receiving the Otselic River from the northeast at Whitney Point. It joins the Chenango from the northwest at Chenango Forks, approximately 10 miles (16 km) northeast of Binghamton.

== Tributaries ==
- Halfway Brook
- Whitney Point Reservoir
- Jennings Creek
- Trout Brook
- West Branch Tioughnioga River
  - Factory Brook
  - Cold Brook
  - Dry Creek
- East Branch Tioughnioga River
  - Albright Creek
  - Haights Creek
  - Trout Brook
  - Cheningo Creek
  - Kenney Brook
  - Labrador Creek
    - Shackham Brook
  - Morgan Hill Creek
  - Maxon Creek
  - West Branch Tioughnioga Creek
    - Fabius Brook
      - The Old Fly
    - Carpenter Creek
  - Tioughnioga Creek
    - Hills Creek
    - Middle Branch Tioughnioga Creek
    - East Branch Tioughnioga Creek

== See also ==
- List of New York rivers
