= Whitney Point, New York =

- Village
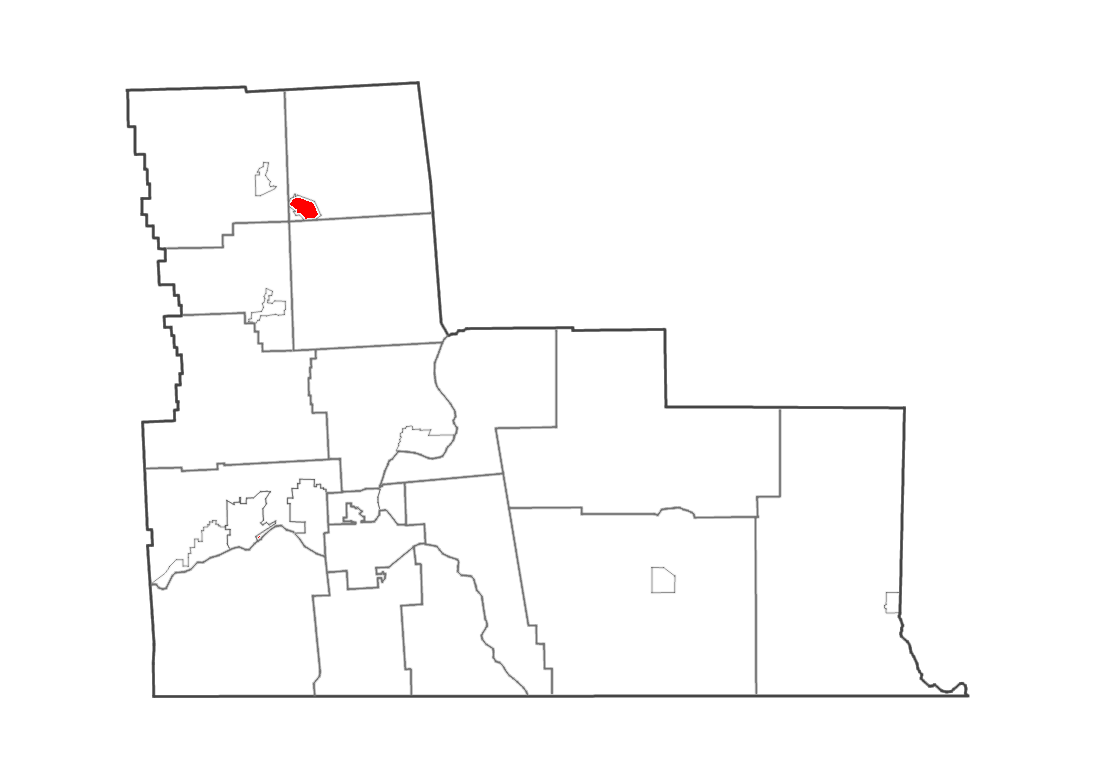
- Map highlighting Whitney Point's location within Broome County.

- Location within the state of New York
- Coordinates: 42°19′48″N 75°58′12″W
- Country: United States
- State: New York
- County: Broome
- Town: Triangle

Government
  - Mayor: Jason Somers

Area
  - Total: 1.11 sq mi (2.88 km^{2})
  - Land: 1.04 sq mi (2.70 km^{2})
  - Water: 0.069 sq mi (0.18 km^{2})
- Elevation: 958 ft (292 m)

Population (2020)
  - Total: 960
  - Density: 920.8/sq mi (355.54/km^{2})
- Time zone: UTC-5 (Eastern (EST))
  - Summer (DST): UTC-4 (EDT)
- ZIP code: 13862
- Area code: 607
- FIPS code: 36-81831
- GNIS feature ID: 0971191
- Website: www.whitneypoint.org

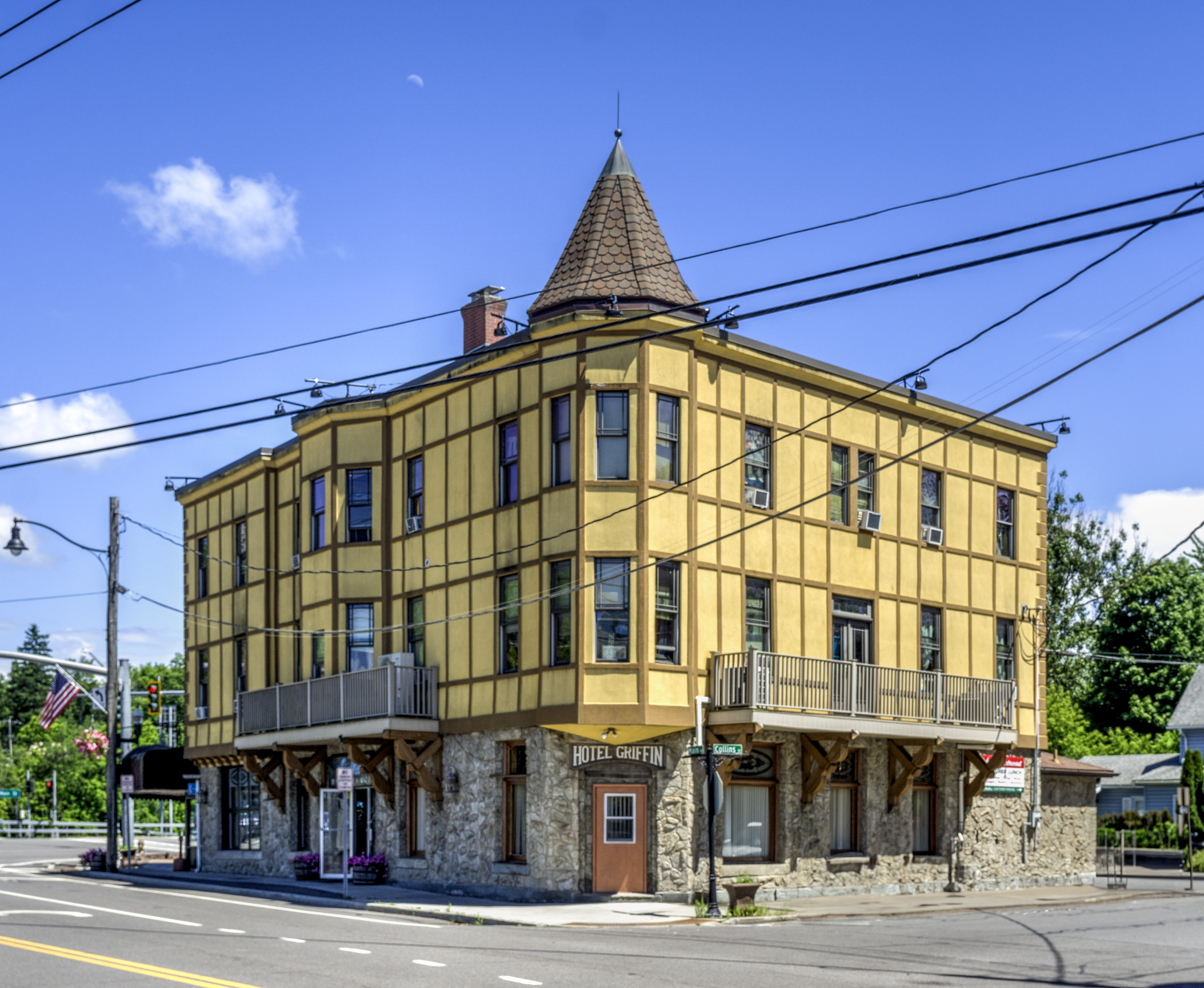
Hotel Griffin, built 1899

Whitney Point is a village in Broome County, New York, United States. As of the 2020 census, Whitney Point had a population of 960. It is part of the Binghamton Metropolitan Statistical Area. The name comes from Thomas and William Whitney, early developers.

The village is in the southwestern corner of the town of Triangle and is north of Binghamton.

== History ==
The village area was first settled around 1791 and began to flourish after the arrival of the Whitney family around 1800.

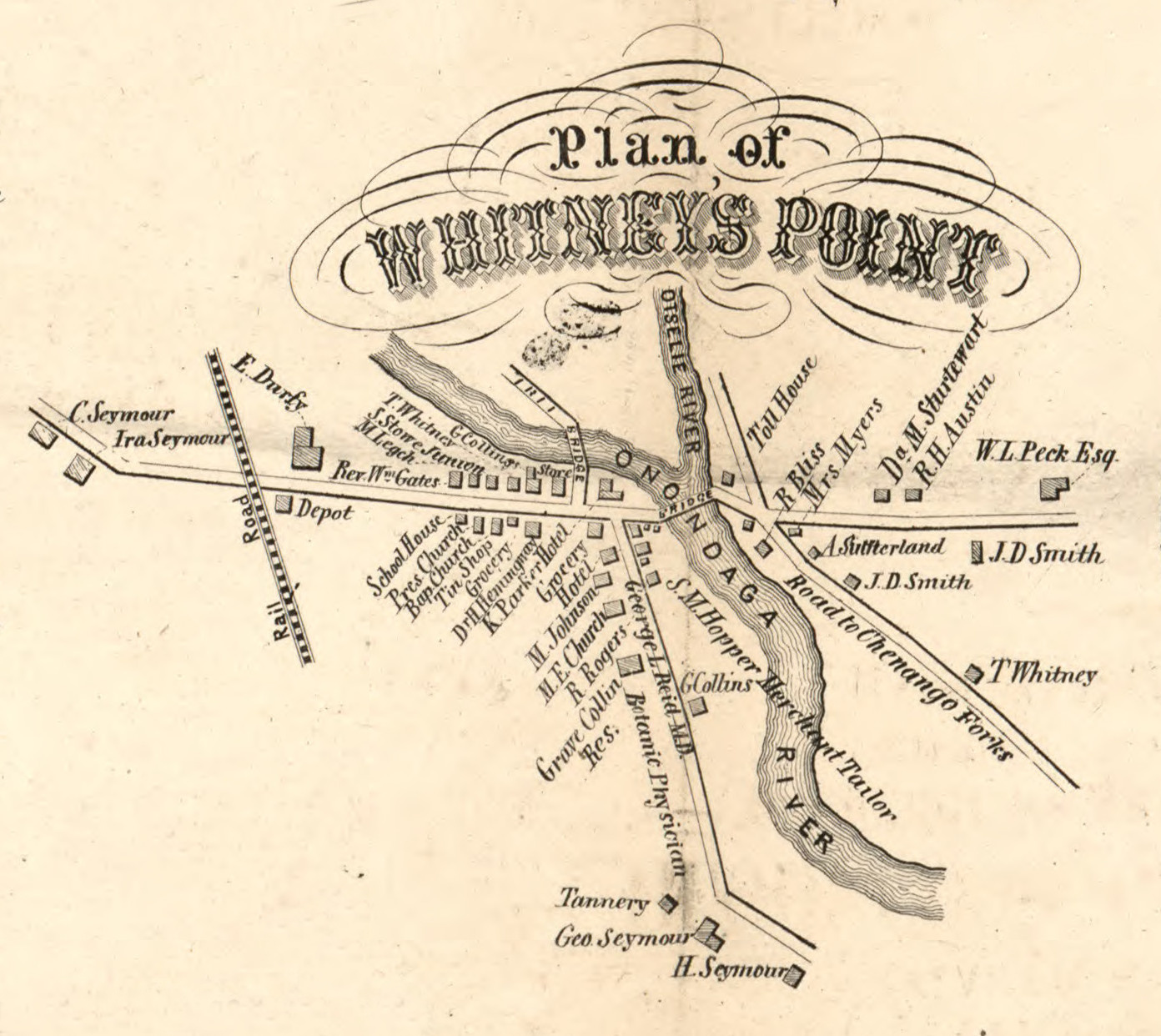
Plan of Whitneys Point (1855)

The village of Whitney Point (originally called "Whitney's Point") was incorporated in 1871. A catastrophic fire almost destroyed the village in 1897. After serious flooding in 1935 and 1936, work began on a dam north of the village on the Otselic River. It was completed in 1942 and — after decisions were later made to impound water on a year-round basis for recreational purposes — formed the Whitney Point Lake (Reservoir).

The village has been the site of the Broome County Fair since 1874.

The Whitney automobile was briefly manufactured in this village around 1902.

Grace Episcopal Church was listed on the National Register of Historic Places in 1998.

The town slogan is "best town by a dam site" in reference to the Whitney Point Reservoir Dam in Dorchester Park.

== Geography ==
Whitney Point is located at 42°19′48″N 75°58′12″W (42.330084, -75.970091).

According to the United States Census Bureau, the village has a total area of 1.1 square miles (2.9 km^{2}), of which 1.0 square mile (2.7 km^{2}) is land and 0.077 square miles (0.2 km^{2}), or 6.31%, is water.

The village is located on the Tioughnioga River, by its junction with the Otselic River.

The village is located at the junction of NY 26, NY 79, NY 206, and US 11. Interstate 81 passes through the western side of the village, with access from Exit 8.

== Demographics ==
Historical population
Census	Pop.	Note	%±
1870	480		—
1880	818		70.4%
1890	842		2.9%
1900	807		−4.2%
1910	744		−7.8%
1920	665		−10.6%
1930	639		−3.9%
1940	733		14.7%
1950	883		20.5%
1960	1,049		18.8%
1970	1,058		0.9%
1980	1,093		3.3%
1990	1,054		−3.6%
2000	965		−8.4%
2010	964		−0.1%
2020	960		−0.4%
U.S. Decennial Census

As of the census of 2000, there were 965 people, 397 households, and 244 families residing in the village. The population density was 966.2 inhabitants per square mile (373.1/km^{2}). There were 432 housing units at an average density of 432.6 units per square mile (167.0 units/km^{2}). The racial makeup of the village was 96.89% White, 0.21% African American, 0.31% Native American, 0.21% Asian, 0.10% Pacific Islander, 0.52% from other races, and 1.76% from two or more races. Hispanic or Latino of any race were 1.55% of the population.

There were 397 households, out of which 35.0% had children under the age of 18 living with them, 43.1% were married couples living together, 13.6% had a female householder with no husband present, and 38.3% were non-families. 31.2% of all households were made up of individuals, and 12.8% had someone living alone who was 65 years of age or older. The average household size was 2.43 and the average family size was 3.09.

In the village, the population was spread out, with 28.3% under the age of 18, 8.2% from 18 to 24, 26.5% from 25 to 44, 22.9% from 45 to 64, and 14.1% who were 65 years of age or older. The median age was 37 years. For every 100 females, there were 88.1 males. For every 100 females age 18 and over, there were 83.1 males.

The median income for a household in the village was $34,934, and the median income for a family was $44,667. Males had a median income of $30,875 versus $27,143 for females. The per capita income for the village was $17,608. About 10.9% of families and 13.2% of the population were below the poverty line, including 19.0% of those under age 18 and 4.3% of those age 65 or over.
