= Louise Chamberlain Purington =

American physician, temperance activist (1844–1916)

Dr. Louise Chamberlain Purington
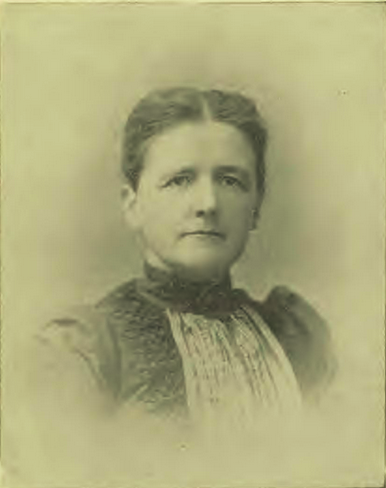
- Photo in Good Health, 1898
- Born: Mary Louise Chamberlain; July 3, 1844; Madison, New York, U.S.
- Died: October 1916 (aged 72); Boston, Massachusetts, U.S.
- Occupations: physician; temperance movement leader
- Spouse: Dillwyn Varney Purington (m. 1866; died 1914)

Louise C. Purington (née Chamberlain; 1844–1916) was an American physician and temperance movement leader. She collaborated with Frances Willard in the early movements and efforts of the Woman's Christian Temperance Union (WCTU). Purington served as National Superintendent of the WCTU's Department of Health and Heredity. She contributed to leading periodicals, as well as publishing manuals and leaflets, in both missionary and temperance lines.

== Early life and education ==
Mary Louise Chamberlain was born near Madison, New York, July 3, 1844. The youngest child of Isaac (1808–1853) and Harriet (Putnam) Chamberlain (1809–1847), she traced her descent through her mother from the Putnam family of Danvers, Massachusetts. The immigrant progenitor of this family, John Putnam, died in 1662, some 20 years or more after his arrival in the colony. Purington was orphaned at an early age.

Her aunt Mary and uncle Adin Howard adopted seven children and assured their education. At the age of 12, Purington was sent to the Utica Academy. At 19, she was graduated from Mount Holyoke Seminary in 1864, and ten years later, from the Hahnemann Medical College, Chicago, (1874) supplementing the course with advanced study and clinical experience in the hospitals and dispensaries of New York City. At the Hahnemann College, Purington took first rank, with one other student leading her large class, its only woman graduate. It was the same bent that led Purington in her youth to offer herself as a hospital nurse in the service of the United States Christian Commission. George H. Stuart, of Philadelphia, was at the head of the department, and had given to each member of the class of 1864 at Mount Holyoke, in which she was graduated, a silver pin, the price of the customary class badge, to the work of the commission.

== Career ==
In Chicago, she developed a close relationship and friendship with Kate Newell Doggett, a social and intellectual leader in the city, and the founder and promoter of the Fortnightly of Chicago, one of the leading literary clubs of women in the U.S. Purington served as chair of its classical committee, and wrote several scholarly papers.

When the temperance crusade reached Chicago, Frances Willard came in from Evanston, Illinois, to address a mass meeting. Purington heard her speak and responded by seeking her leadership, as well as becoming her co-worker and lifelong friend. The association of that year with Willard was invaluable to Purington, opening new perspectives. Purington regarded Willard's influence as among the dominant forces in her life, and especially owed to it her ultimate devotion to the temperance cause. An immediate result was the formation of the first "Y", or Young Woman's Christian Temperance Union, at her home in Chicago.

In the mission field, also, Purington specialized in young women's work. As an active member for 12 years of the Woman's Board of Missions of the Interior, she originated and carried forward the young women's work. She was nicknamed "Bishop of the Girls of the Interior" and popularly known as "Engineer of the Bridge," whereby she aroused enthusiasm and secured unity of action in the mission societies she formed. Her interest in foreign missions can be traced to a favorite teacher at Mount Holyoke. To that teacher, Ann Eliza Fritcher, afterward a missionary under the American Board, founder and long-time principal of the Girls' School at Marsovan, Turkey, Purington felt a deep spiritual obligation.

A nervous breakdown came, the consequence of anxiety and overwork, lasting two years or more. It necessitated a long residence at Clifton Springs Sanitarium and the help of Dr. Henry Foster. A gradual restoration was followed by change of scene and surroundings and a new home in Boston, with her friend, Ella Gilbert Ives.

Purington was associated since 1885 in a school for girls, at the same time being involved in philanthropic work. For 10 years, she has held an influential position in the WCTU, running the gamut of local and county president, local, State, and national superintendent, and later, editor of the State paper. She served several years as national superintendent of franchise, and compiled for Willard the facts used by her in her annual addresses to exhibit the progress of women. In 1895, Purington was transferred to the department of health and heredity, which, as national superintendent, she organized and developed, rallying to her assistance State superintendents and a host of earnest workers in her constituency.

The aim of her department was the development of physical, mental, and spiritual life, as well as a clean, healthy civic life. It included cooperation with boards of health in the enforcement of health ordinances; school hygiene and sanitation, instruction in health's relation to dress, food, air, exercise, cleanliness, mental and moral hygiene. The department was active in trying to secure the passage of pure food bills, legislative enactments relating to public health, milk and poultry inspection, all of which work covered a wide field of endeavor, and was attended year by year with increasingly good results.

In 1903, at the World's Convention of the WCTU in Geneva, Switzerland, Purington was appointed World's Superintendent of the department cooperation with missionary societies; thus being enabled to unify her life-long work in two fields of activity.

Purington was the dean of the official board of the Suffolk Branch of the Women's Board of Missions. She was the first Secretary of Young People's Work in the Branch, a position which she filled from 1890 until 1898. Since then she was a member of the Board of Managers. She wrote much on this subject. Purington's contributions to leading periodicals, as well as her manuals and leaflets, in both missionary and temperance lines were recognized. Especially valuable were her life studies in the field of health and heredity.

Purington supported woman's suffrage.

== Personal life ==
In 1866, she married Dillwyn Varney Purington (1841–1914).

Although she has been afflicted for several years with lessening eyesight, she maintained her deep interest in church and missionary activities to the last. Louise C. Purington died at her home in Dorchester, Boston, October 24/26, 1916.

== Selected works ==
- The Literature of Missions, 1876
- Medical Missions: Teaching and Healing, 1903 (text)
- Our Medical Work: Woman's Board of Missions, W.B.M.I., and W.B.M.P. Physicians, Trained Nurses, Hospitals, Dispensaries, Sanitation and Hygiene on the Foreign Field, 1903
- The Philosophy of Fashion: What Shall We Wear?, 1903
