= Madison, New York (disambiguation) =

Madison, New York may refer to:

- Madison County, New York
- Madison (town), New York, located in Madison County
- Madison (village), New York, located within the Town of Madison

== See also ==
- Madison Avenue, a north–south avenue in the borough of Manhattan
- Madison Square
- Madison Square Garden
