= Hamilton Village Historic District =

Historic district in New York, United States

- U.S. National Register of Historic Places
- U.S. Historic district
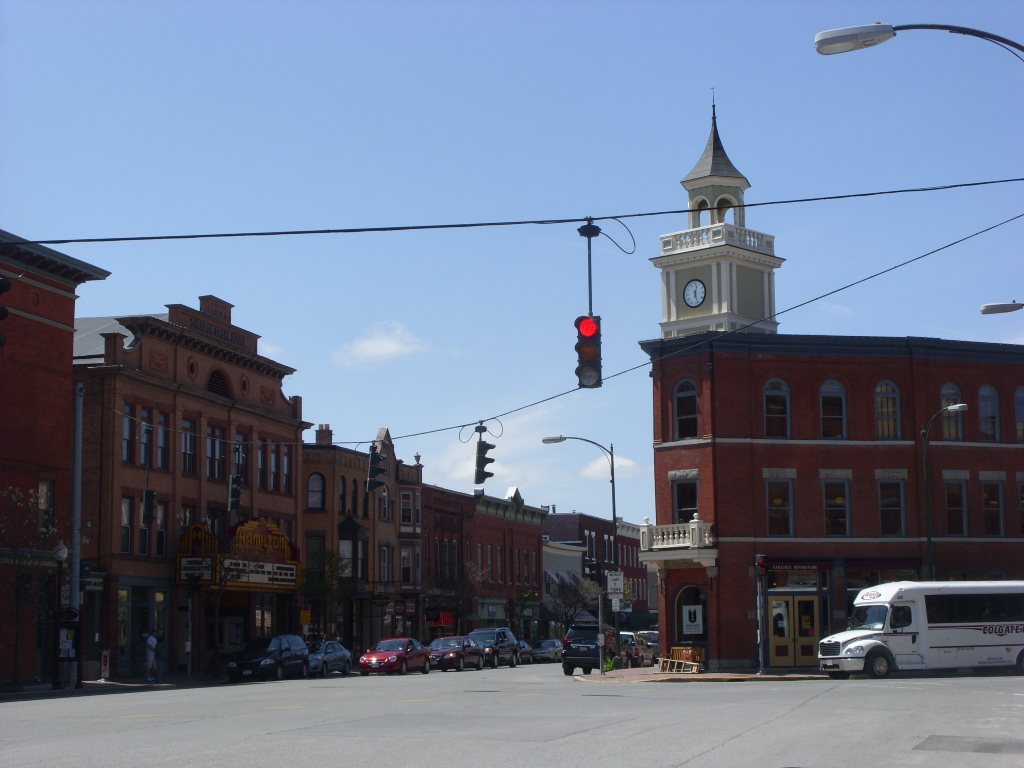
- Hamilton Village Historic District, May 2009

- Location within New York Location within the United States
- Location: Roughly Kendrick Ave., Broad, Payne, Hamilton, Madison, Pleasant and Lebanon Sts., Hamilton, New York
- Coordinates: 42°49′22″N 75°32′33″W
- Area: 56 acres (23 ha)
- Built: 1804
- Architect: Multiple
- Architectural style: Mid 19th Century Revival, Late Victorian, Federal
- NRHP reference No.: 84002494
- Added to NRHP: September 13, 1984

Hamilton Village Historic District is a national historic district located at Hamilton in Madison County, New York. The district contains 155 contributing buildings and one contributing site. Most of the buildings are residential, but the district also includes commercial structures, churches and public buildings. The centerpiece is the Village park, laid out in 1822. Located within the district are the separately listed Adon Smith House and U.S. Post Office building.

It was added to the National Register of Historic Places in 1984.
