= Hamilton (village), New York =

Village in Madison County, New York, US

Hamilton, New York
- Village
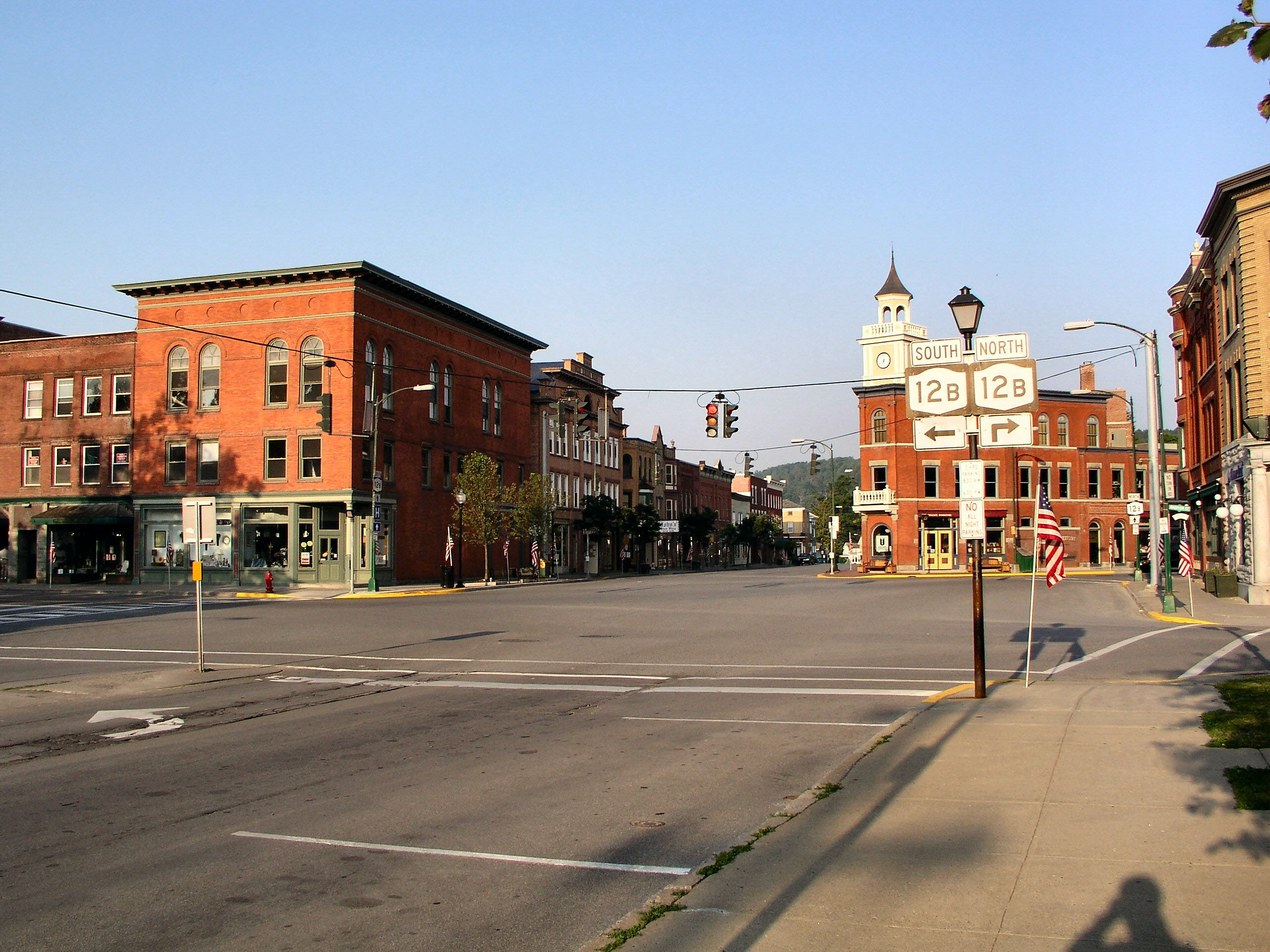
- The village of Hamilton

- Location within New York Location within the United States
- Coordinates: 42°49′30″N 75°32′45″W
- Country: United States
- State: New York
- County: Madison
- Towns: Hamilton, Madison, Eaton

Government
  - Mayor: RuthAnn Loveless

Area
  - Total: 2.69 sq mi (6.96 km^{2})
  - Land: 2.49 sq mi (6.46 km^{2})
  - Water: 0.19 sq mi (0.50 km^{2})
- Elevation: 1,122 ft (342 m)

Population (2020)
  - Total: 4,107
  - Density: 1,647.0/sq mi (635.91/km^{2})
- Time zone: UTC-5 (Eastern (EST))
  - Summer (DST): UTC-4 (EDT)
- ZIP Code: 13346
- Area code: 315
- FIPS code: 36-31709
- GNIS feature ID: 0952091
- Website: hamilton-ny.gov

Hamilton is a village located within the town of Hamilton in Madison County, New York, United States. As of the 2020 census, the village had a population of 4,107. It is the location of Colgate University.

== History ==
The area that became the town and village of Hamilton was originally inhabited by members of the Iroquois League, and some of the territory is still considered to be sacred by the Oneida Indian Nation. Following the American Revolution, the area was ceded to the State of New York. Until 1878, Hamilton was an original outpost of the Chenango Canal.

The town of Hamilton was founded near what is now Earlville, and gradually expanded into a wide area populated by farms and settlements.

The family of the brothers Samuel and Elisha Payne had been prominent in Connecticut since before the Revolutionary War, in which they had served, possibly at Fort Stanwix, near what is now Rome, New York. At the close of the Revolutionary War, the pair moved from Lebanon, Connecticut, to the town of Whitestone (now Whitesboro, New York), a few miles from Utica.

In 1794, Samuel Payne moved southwest from Whitestone into the town of Hamilton, where he started a farm on the hill that is today's location of Colgate University.

In 1795, a year after his brother moved into the town of Hamilton, Elisha Payne did so as well. He and others from Whitestone and Connecticut moved to an unsettled area just north of his brother, and that settlement grew to become today's village of Hamilton. Because of Elisha Payne's interest and ability in developing the settlement, it became known as "Payne's Settlement". He built a barn, the first framed building in the village, and in 1802 he opened a tavern at the intersection of Broad and Lebanon streets, taking the place of an existing tavern that had opened in 1800. This became the Park House (hotel), which in 1925 was replaced by the present-day Colgate Inn.

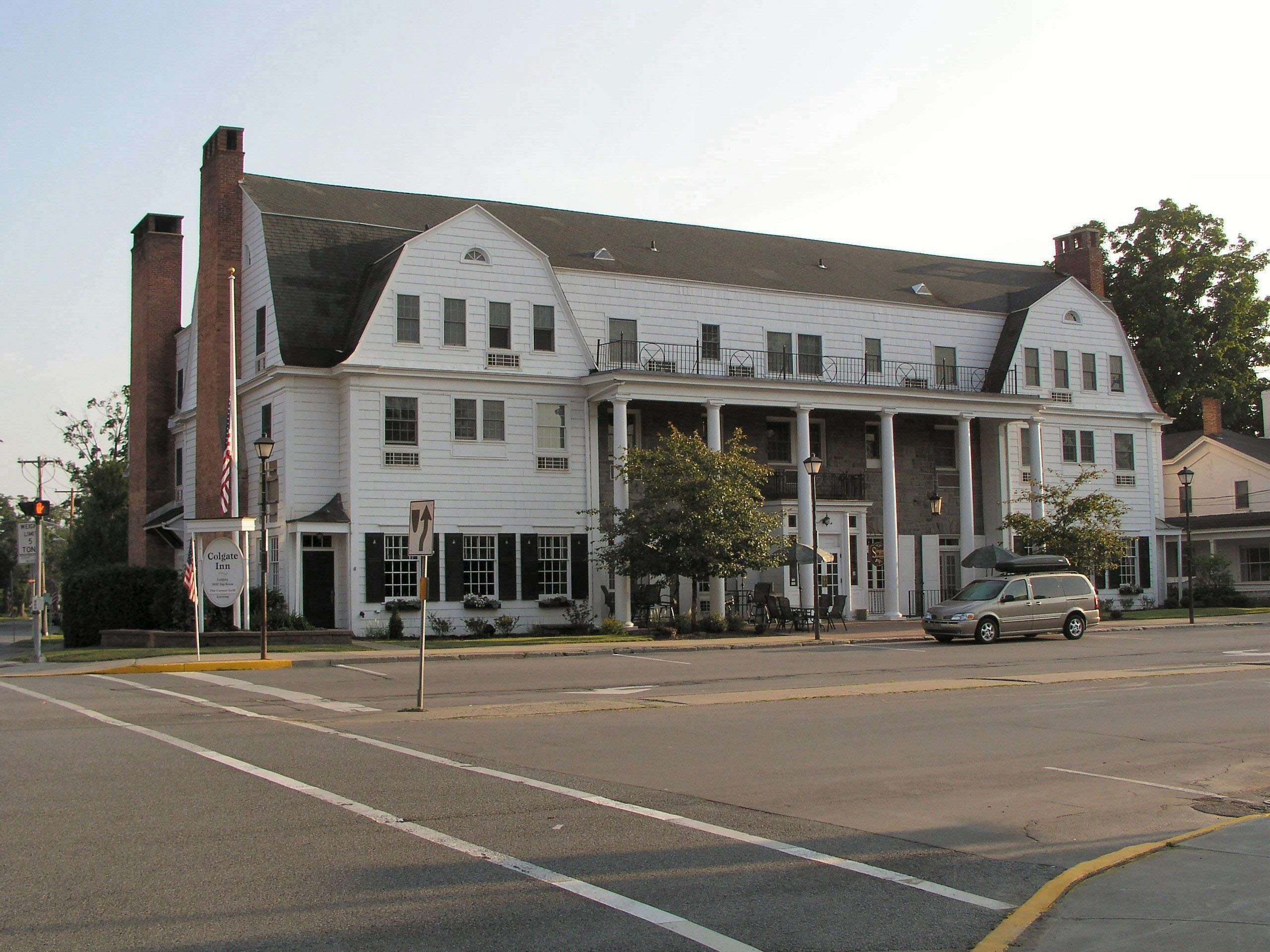
Colgate Inn, Hamilton, NY

By 1800, Payne's Settlement had, in addition to log cabins, five framed buildings and a nearby sawmill. By 1806 much of the land surrounding the settlement had been cleared and replaced by orchards and farms. Salt was the accepted form of currency in the settlement.

Payne's Settlement experienced a financial boom from 1800 through the War of 1812 due to extensive crop exports to Europe and to the high prices obtained for provisions in New York during the war. Serving as the trading center, the settlement naturally prospered when farmers received higher prices. In addition, the 1808 opening of the Skaneateles Turnpike, which connected the village to western New York, probably contributed to the favorable economic climate.

From the beginning, Payne's Settlement and the other settlements within the town of Hamilton strongly competed to be the principal location for development. Due to the advantages of its location, the balance of power shifted toward Payne's Settlement, and in 1812 the settlement obtained a charter incorporating the Village of Hamilton.

Early commerce in the village included groceries, blacksmiths, book sellers, furniture and carriage makers, feed stores, quarries and lumber mills. The village's first newspaper, the Hamilton Recorder, was started in 1817. The Chenango Canal (1834–1878) passed through the west side of the village alongside what is now the Barge Canal Cafe, providing another connection between the Erie Canal, Midwest grain farms and East Coast markets. Agriculture in the surrounding area initially emphasized hops, which gave way after the Civil War to dairy farming.

Colgate University was founded in the village in 1819. Today, Colgate's campus is located on what was Samuel Payne's farm. In 1827, the farm, valued at $4,000 ($113,824 in 2025), covering 123 acres (50 ha), was donated by Payne and his wife to the Baptist Theological Society as the new location of the Society's Theological Institution, known as the Hamilton Literary and Theological Institution, which later became Colgate. In 1846, the name of Hamilton Literary and Theological Institution was changed to Madison University. The year 1890 brought about the change in the university's name to Colgate University, in honor of the involvement and financial support of the Colgate family over many years.

In 1903, John Vincent Atanasoff, creator of the first digital electronic computer, was born in Hamilton.

Much of the historic core of the village is part of the Hamilton Village Historic District, which became listed on the National Register of Historic Places in 1984. Many of the buildings in today's village date from 1895, the year of "the great fire" which destroyed much of the village. Many of those buildings were rebuilt in the same year, with "1895" on their facades.

The 2017 movie Pottersville starring Michael Shannon and Judy Greer was filmed here.

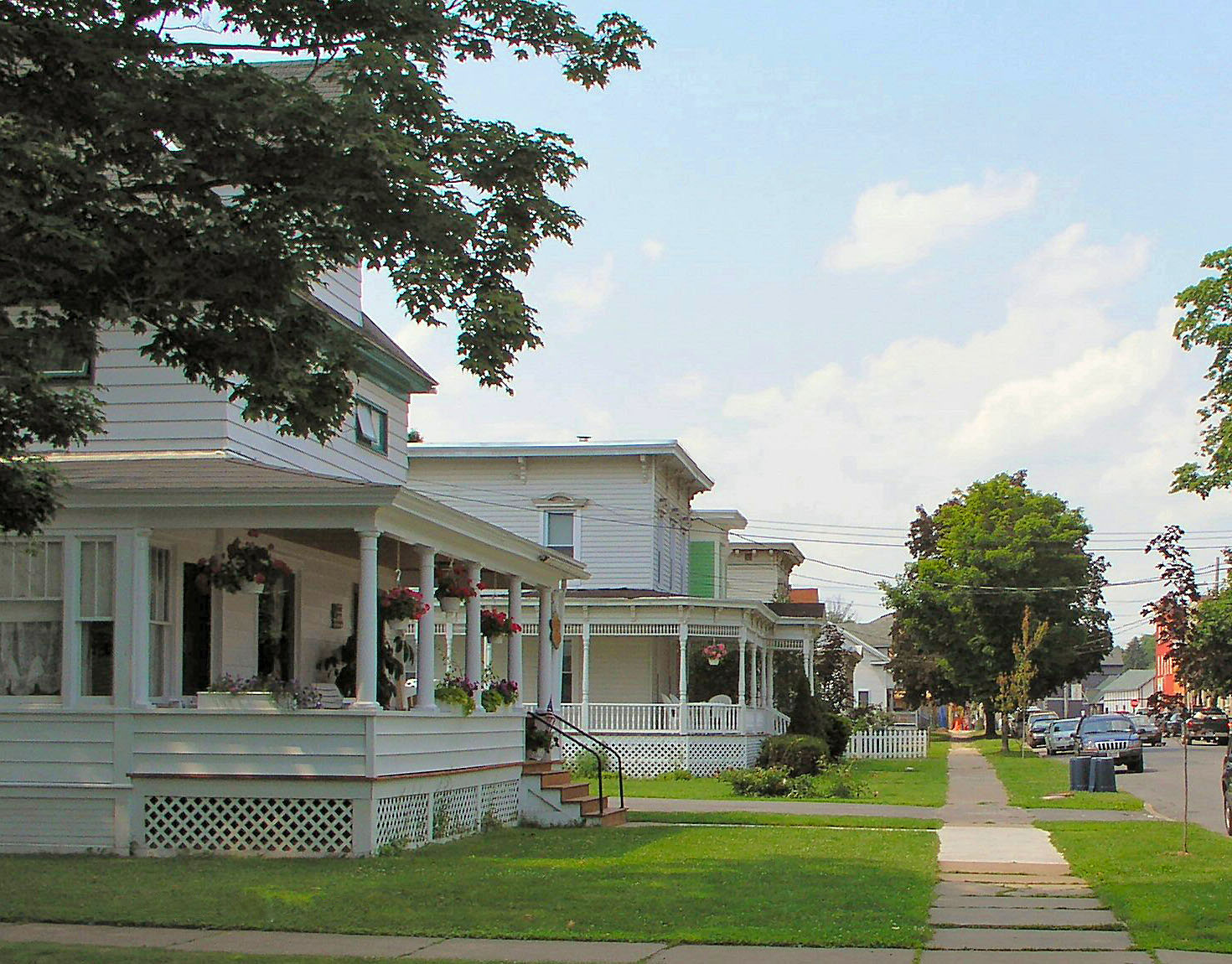
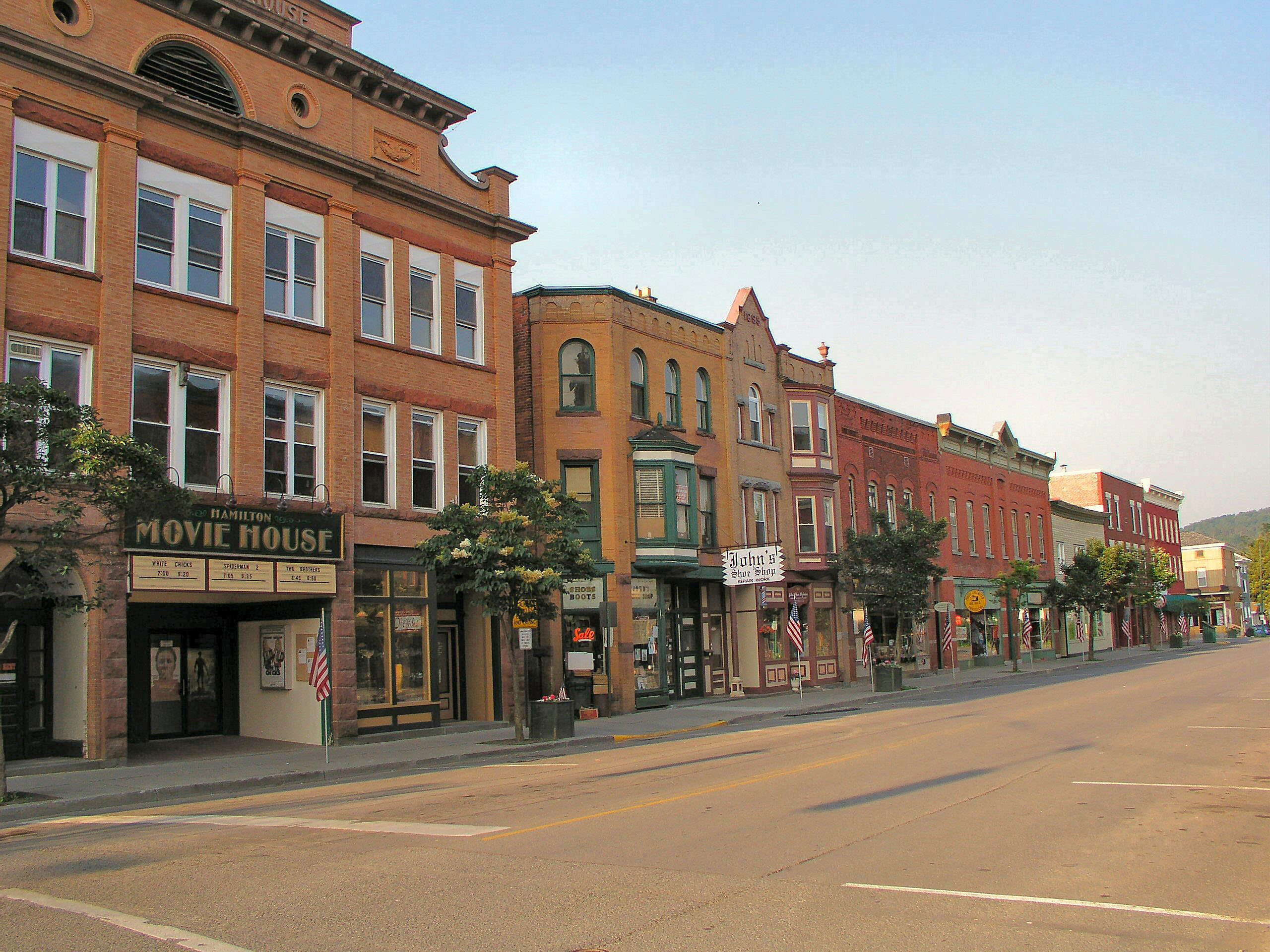
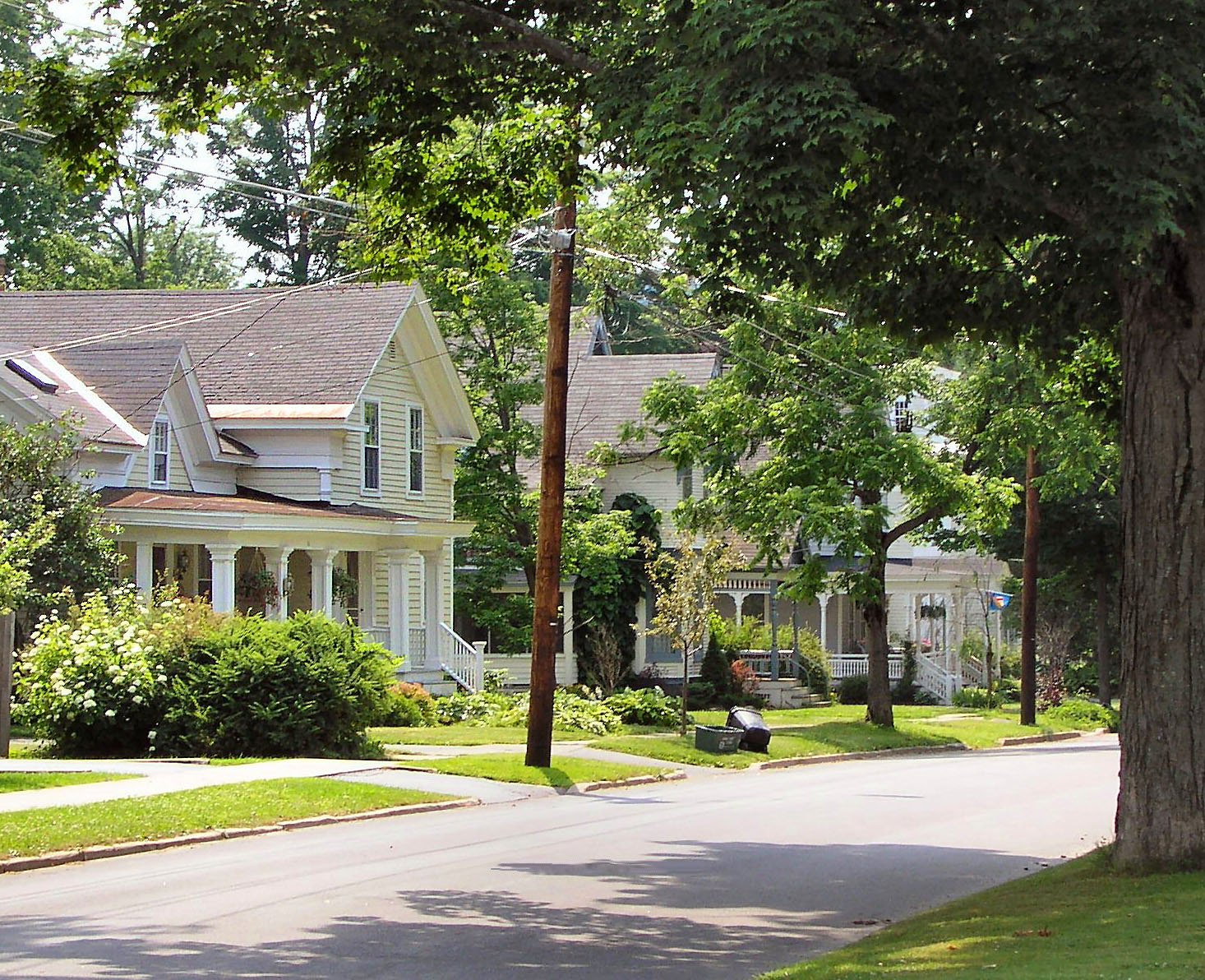
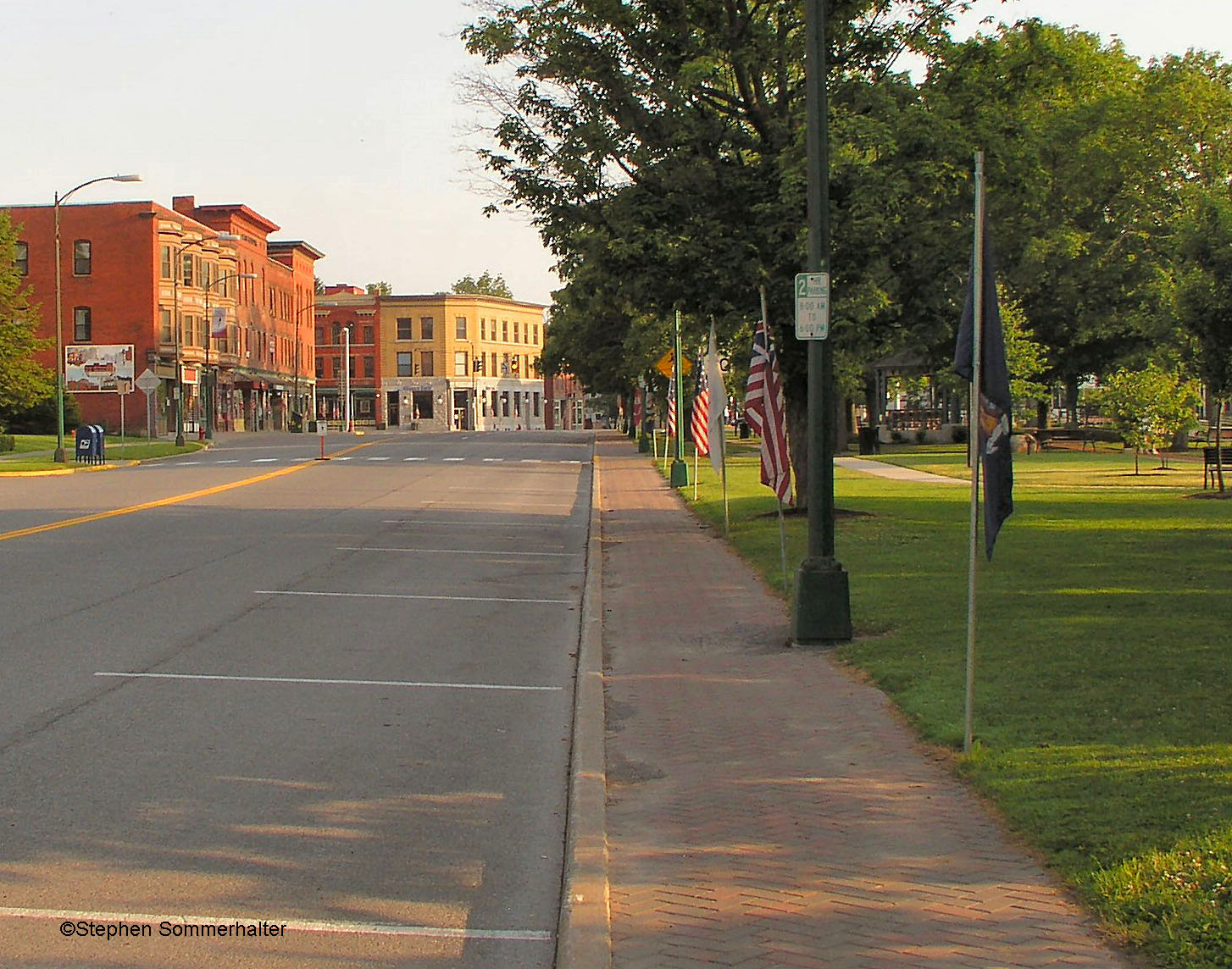
Village of Hamilton street scenes. See for a live webcam of downtown Hamilton.

Also listed on the National Register of Historic Places are the Old Biology Hall (today called Hascall Hall) on Colgate University's campus, Adon Smith House, and United States Post Office.

== Geography and climate ==
The village, located at 42°49′32″N 75°32′40″W (42.825646, −75.544673), lies in the Chenango Valley, just south of the headwaters of the Chenango River, part of the Susquehanna River watershed. Most of the village is in the northwest corner of the town of Hamilton, but the village limits extend north into the towns of Madison and Eaton. New York State Route 12B passes through the village on Broad Street and Utica Street, leading north 6 miles (10 km) to the village of Madison and south 11 miles (18 km) to Sherburne. The village is approximately 40 miles (64 km) southeast of Syracuse and 30 miles (48 km) southwest of Utica.

Northeast of Hamilton is Payne Brook, which starts at Lake Moraine and travels through the village before converging with the Chenango River. The elevation of the village's municipal airport (Hamilton Municipal Airport) is approximately 1,100 feet (340 m) above sea level.

According to the U.S. Census Bureau, the village's total area is 2.7 square miles (7.0 km^{2}), of which 2.5 square miles (6.5 km^{2}) are land and 0.2 square miles (0.5 km^{2}), or 7.15%, are water.

Snowfall is the most notable aspect of the area's climate, which is typical of central Upstate New York in the vicinity of Syracuse. Snowfall produced by lake-effect snow from Lake Erie and Lake Ontario usually extends into the Mohawk Valley and often inland as far as the southern Finger Lakes and the nearby southern tier of counties; with snowfall, at a minimum, in the range of 40 to 50 inches (100 to 130 cm) per season. Heavy snow falls frequently occur, generating from 1 to 2 feet (0.3 to 0.6 m) of snow and occasionally 4 feet (1.2 m) or more. The village's average seasonal snowfall is approximately 80 inches (2.0 m).

== Government ==
The village is governed by a board of trustees. It consists of the mayor, who is presiding officer, and four trustees. The mayor and trustees are elected at the annual village election in June for staggered terms of two-years.

The mayor exercises the executive function and is assisted by the Village Administrator, the Clerk/Treasurer, and the Director of Utilities and Public Works. The board of trustees is the legislative body. It enacts local laws, adopts the budget, and exercises oversight over the Village departments, boards, commissions and committees. Trustees are assigned by the mayor specific oversight and liaison responsibilities. The mayor appoints all public officers and volunteer members of boards, commissions and committees with the approval of the board of trustees. In addition to the elected officials and professional officers, the governance of the village rests in the hands of about fifty volunteers who serve by appointment on ten boards, commissions, and committees. The mayor is an ex officio member of every village body. Every trustee serves a liaison on one or more of the bodies.

The 2009–2010 annual budget of the village is approximately 5.7 million dollars.

The Village Court is independent of village government. The Village Judge is elected by the voters for a four-year term.

The village and all of Madison County are within the NY 22nd Congressional District.

== Demographics ==
Historical population
Census	Pop.	Note	%±
1860	1,599		—
1870	1,529		−4.4%
1880	1,638		7.1%
1890	1,744		6.5%
1900	1,627		−6.7%
1910	1,689		3.8%
1920	1,505		−10.9%
1930	1,700		13.0%
1940	1,790		5.3%
1950	3,507		95.9%
1960	3,348		−4.5%
1970	3,636		8.6%
1980	3,725		2.4%
1990	3,790		1.7%
2000	3,509		−7.4%
2010	4,239		20.8%
2020	4,107		−3.1%
U.S. Decennial Census

As of the census of 2000, there were 3,509 people, 707 households, and 320 families residing in the village. The population density was 1,492.2 inhabitants per square mile (576.1/km^{2}). There were 785 housing units at an average density of 333.8 per square mile (128.9/km^{2}). The racial makeup of the village was 90.85% White, 2.91% Black or African American, 0.09% Native American, 3.70% Asian, 0.06% Pacific Islander, 0.46% from other races, and 1.94% from two or more races. Hispanic or Latino of any race were 2.28% of the population.

There were 707 households, out of which 21.9% had children under the age of 18 living with them, 37.6% were married couples living together, 6.1% had a female householder with no husband present, and 54.6% were non-families. 41.3% of all households were made up of individuals, and 19.9% had someone living alone who was 65 years of age or older. The average household size was 2.13 and the average family size was 2.92.

In the village, the population was spread out, with 8.6% under the age of 18, 62.6% from 18 to 24, 10.0% from 25 to 44, 9.3% from 45 to 64, and 9.5% who were 65 years of age or older. The median age was 21 years. For every 100 females, there were 83.5 males. For every 100 females age 18 and over, there were 81.7 males.

The median income for a household in the village was $36,583, and the median income for a family was $68,864. Males had a median income of $41,000 versus $33,750 for females. The per capita income for the village was $13,203. About 3.1% of families and 18.5% of the population were below the poverty line, including 8.2% of those under age 18 and 7.2% of those age 65 or over.

== Education ==
The school district is Hamilton Central School District. The Hamilton Central School, located on a 45-acre (18 ha) site off West Kendrick Avenue, is a K–12 educational facility for the village and surrounding town and the communities of Eaton, Madison, Lebanon, and Brookfield.

Almost all of the land of Colgate University is in Hamilton Village.

=== Relationship with Colgate ===
Colgate is the largest economic influence in the village: with a population of over 4,000, the village's population is just slightly larger than the size of Colgate's student body, which is just under 3,000. Approximately 85 percent of the university's faculty members live within 10 minutes of campus.

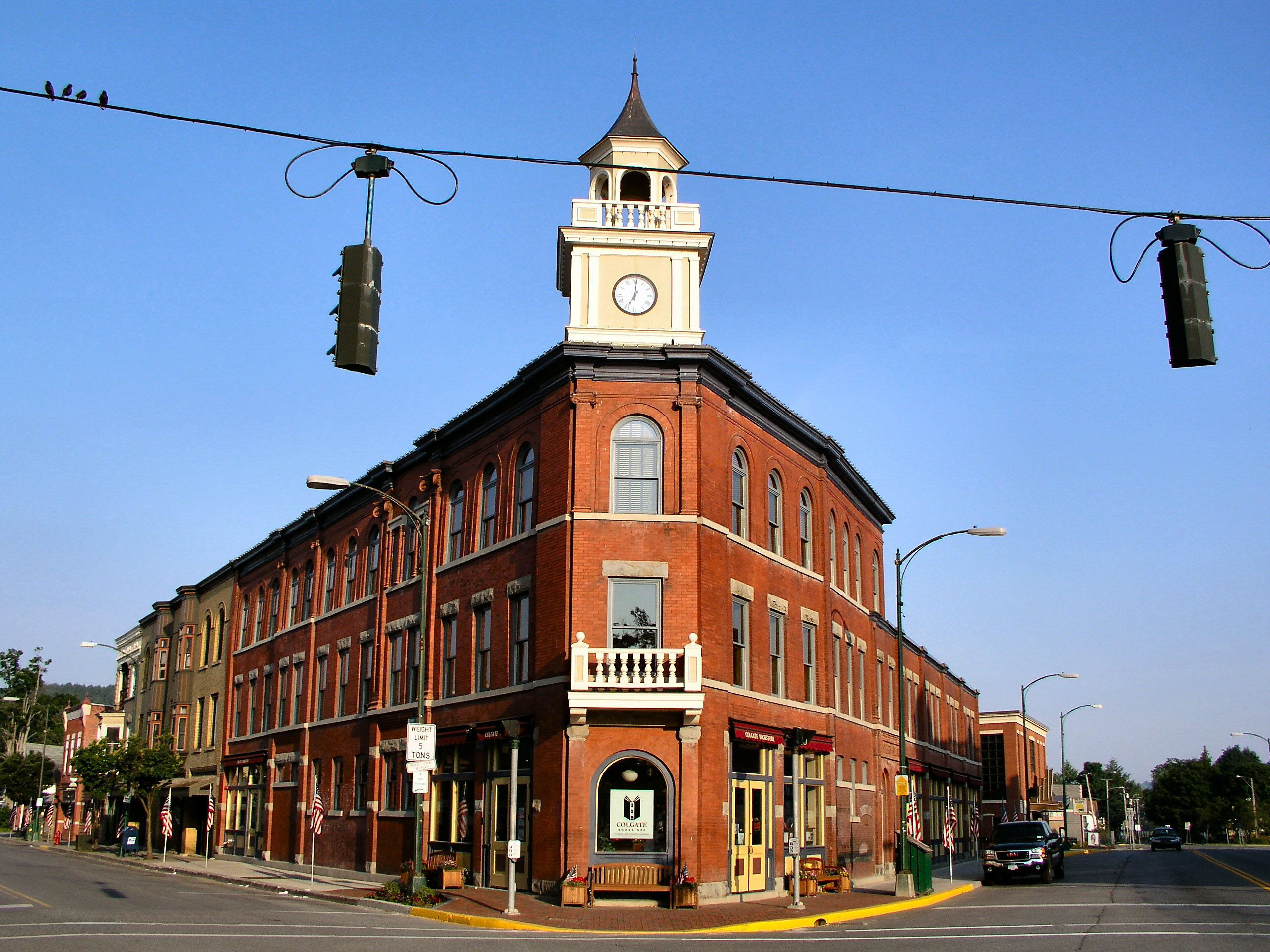
Colgate University's Bookstore, downtown

The village, the town of Hamilton, and Colgate have formed the Partnership for Community Development which develops an active network of professional consultants, foundations, municipalities and not-for-profit organizations located throughout the Central New York region to assist area residents, businesses and visitors, including efforts to stimulate and support local business through small business development and the revitalization of historic buildings. To strengthen the relationship between the village and the university, and to add to the economic development of downtown, Colgate relocated its campus bookstore to the downtown area of the village.

== Points of interest ==
The Robert Trent Jones, Sr. designed Seven Oaks Golf Course is located on the east side of the village on the college campus. The Picker Art Gallery is located on the Colgate University campus. The Towpath Trail, beginning in the village and extending northward for 6 miles (9.7 km), consists of restored portions of the Chenango Canal towpath. The Village of Hamilton is also home to award-winning Good Nature Farm Brewery & Tap Room. Good Nature opened in 2012, was Madison County's first brewery, and among New York State's First Farm Breweries. In 2017, Good Nature opened a new brewery in the Village. A Utica television station travel show broadcast, in 2008, a two-part tour of things to see and do in the village.

== Notable people ==
- John Vincent Atanasoff, physicist and inventor, inventor of first electronic digital computer
- William L. Greenly, sixth governor of Michigan
- Matt Malloy, actor and producer
- Philo A. Orton, Wisconsin legislator and jurist
- Henry B. Payne, U.S. senator and congressman
- Sereno E. Payne, congressman, first House Majority Leader
- List of Colgate University people
