= Port Dickinson, New York =

- Village
- Seal

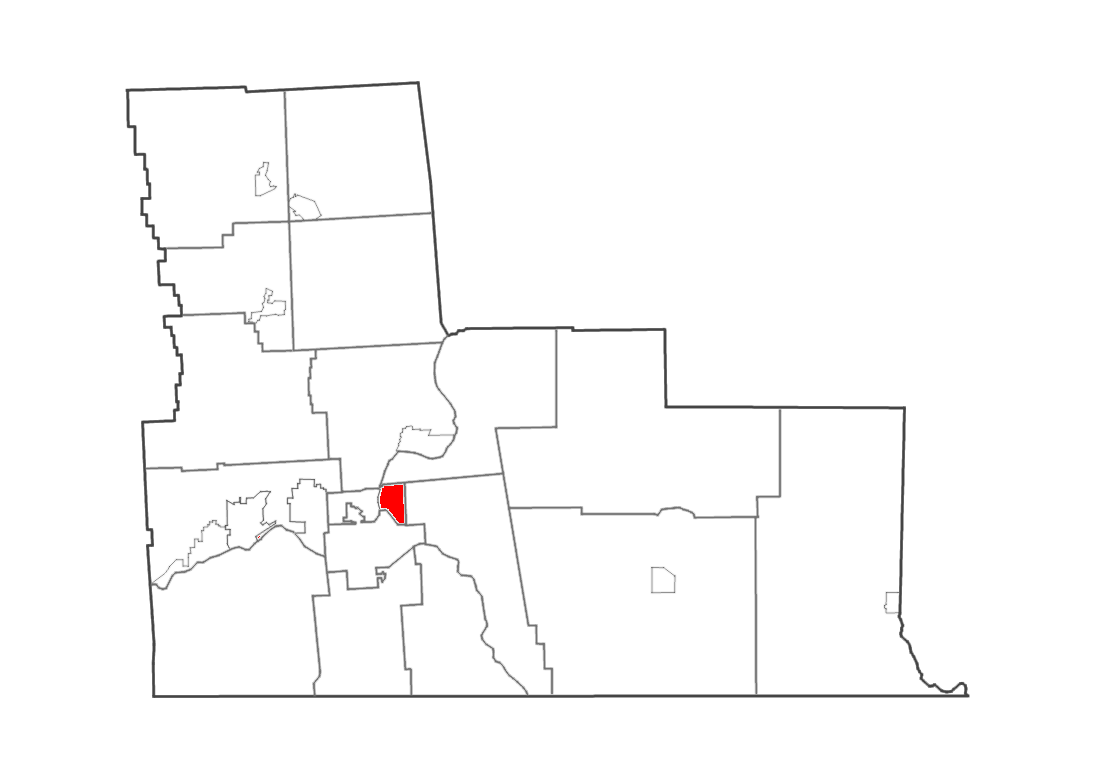
- Map highlighting Port Dickinson's location within Broome County.

- Location within the state of New York
- Coordinates: 42°8′14″N 75°53′40″W
- Country: United States
- State: New York
- County: Broome
- Town: Dickinson
- Incorporated: 1876

Area
  - Total: 0.70 sq mi (1.81 km^{2})
  - Land: 0.63 sq mi (1.62 km^{2})
  - Water: 0.073 sq mi (0.19 km^{2})
- Elevation: 863 ft (263 m)

Population (2020)
  - Total: 1,699
  - Density: 2,711.3/sq mi (1,046.84/km^{2})
- Time zone: UTC-5 (Eastern (EST))
  - Summer (DST): UTC-4 (EDT)
- ZIP Code: 13901 (Binghamton)
- Area code: 607
- FIPS code: 36-59245
- GNIS feature ID: 960962
- Website: portdickinsonny.gov

Port Dickinson is a village in Broome County, New York, United States. The population was 1,699 at the 2020 census. It is part of the Binghamton Metropolitan Statistical Area.

The village lies within the town of Dickinson and is north of Binghamton.

== History ==
The village of Port Dickinson was incorporated in 1876. It takes its name from having once been a prosperous port on the now-extinct Chenango Canal, and in honor of United States Senator Daniel S. Dickinson. It is now a residential suburb of Binghamton. Port Dickinson is the only incorporated community within the town of Dickinson.

The Bevier-Wright House was listed on the National Register of Historic Places in 2008.

== Geography ==
Port Dickinson is located at 42°8′14″N 75°53′40″W (42.137175, -75.894321).

According to the United States Census Bureau, the village has a total area of 0.73 square miles (1.9 km^{2}), of which 0.66 square miles (1.7 km^{2}) is land and 0.077 square miles (0.2 km^{2}), or 10.92%, is water.

New York State Route 7 is a major highway through the village. Port Dickinson is near the junctions of major highways, including Interstate 81, Interstate 88, and New York State Route 17.

=== Adjacent towns and areas ===
The town of Fenton and its neighborhood of Hillcrest border Port Dickinson on the north, while the city of Binghamton borders it on the south. It is bordered on the west by the Chenango River, a tributary of the Susquehanna River, and on the east by the Canadian Pacific Railway, beyond which is additional unincorporated land in the town of Dickinson.

=== Flooding history ===
Several major floods have occurred in the area. An earth levee along the Chenango River and Phelps Creek and the channel excavation of Phelps Creek in 1943 by the US Army Corps of Engineers helped reduce the devastation that was brought on by earlier floods of the Susquehanna River basin. These floods included ones in 1810, 1865, 1889, 1894, 1935, 1936, 2006, and most recently, 2011. In 1949, the US Army Corps of Engineers excavated a 1,300-foot (400 m) pilot channel and removed foundation pilings along the Chenango River. Minor floods have occurred since then about once every 10 years, although the average length between floods is 20 years for the Chenango River in general.

== Demographics ==
Historical population
Census	Pop.	Note	%±
1880	373		—
1890	345		−7.5%
1900	379		9.9%
1910	437		15.3%
1920	883		102.1%
1930	1,902		115.4%
1940	2,436		28.1%
1950	2,199		−9.7%
1960	2,295		4.4%
1970	2,132		−7.1%
1980	1,974		−7.4%
1990	1,785		−9.6%
2000	1,697		−4.9%
2010	1,641		−3.3%
2020	1,699		3.5%
U.S. Decennial Census

As of the census of 2000, there were 1,697 people, 734 households, and 438 families residing in the village. The population density was 2,687.0 inhabitants per square mile (1,037.5/km^{2}). There were 799 housing units at an average density of 1,265.1 per square mile (488.5/km^{2}). The racial makeup of the village was 96.70% White, 1.24% African American, 0.12% Native American, 0.35% Asian, 0.41% from other races, and 1.18% from two or more races. Hispanic or Latino of any race were 0.53% of the population.

There were 734 households, out of which 32.0% had children under the age of 18 living with them, 42.8% were married couples living together, 14.4% had a female householder with no husband present, and 40.2% were non-families. 34.3% of all households were made up of individuals, and 15.5% had someone living alone who was 65 years of age or older. The average household size was 2.31 and the average family size was 3.00.

In the village, the population was spread out, with 26.5% under the age of 18, 7.3% from 18 to 24, 27.9% from 25 to 44, 22.3% from 45 to 64, and 16.0% who were 65 years of age or older. The median age was 38 years. For every 100 females, there were 86.9 males. For every 100 females age 18 and over, there were 76.9 males.

The median income for a household in the village was $38,393, and the median income for a family was $44,779. Males had a median income of $35,870 versus $25,726 for females. The per capita income for the village was $19,667. About 3.4% of families and 5.7% of the population were below the poverty line, including 5.8% of those under age 18 and 6.2% of those age 65 or over.

== Recreation ==
There are a few recreational facilities in the village. The Jeanne and John D. Wilfley Community Park is a reclaimed flood plain adjacent to the Chenango River. It was named, at first, the Port Dickinson Community Park. However, in 2000, with the news of Mayor Wilfley retiring, the village renamed the park in his honor. The park is accessible from Chenango Street, which is above the filled-in Chenango Canal. Interstate 88 passes over the park. There is a 0.75-mile (1.21 km) walking trail along the perimeter of the park. The park has a pavilion with picnic tables and several charcoal grills, two tennis courts, a basketball court, two squash courts, two baseball fields, a soccer field, and restroom facilities. The park also has an extension at the intersection of Chenango Street and Beacon Street which provides several picnic tables. On Chenango Street there's a gift shop called The Black Sheep: Gifts & Home Decor.

The King Avenue park and Wayne Avenue Field are not official village parks but are treated as such by residents. The Wayne Avenue park has a baseball field. The King Avenue park features the Port Dickinson Community Association's headquarters, restroom facilities, two baseball fields, and a softball field.
