= Landmark Tavern =

Landmark Tavern may refer to:

- Landmark Tavern, also known as Coolidge Stores Building, in Bouckville, New York
- Landmark Tavern (Canton, Ohio), listed on the NRHP in Stark County, Ohio
