= Lake Moraine (New York) =

- Location within New York Lake Moraine (the United States)
- Location: Madison County, New York, United States
- Coordinates: 42°51′22″N 75°31′08″W
- Type: Lake
- Primary inflows: Payne Brook
- Primary outflows: Payne Brook
- Basin countries: United States
- Max. length: 1.62 miles (2.61 km)
- Surface area: 261 acres (1.06 km^{2})
- Average depth: 17.7 feet (5.4 m)
- Max. depth: 45 feet (14 m)
- Surface elevation: 1,211 feet (369 m)
- Islands: 4 Big Island, Kinmouth Island, Heyser Island, Snake Island
- Settlements: Hamilton, New York

Lake Moraine (also known as Madison Reservoir) is a mesotrophic lake located 2.5 miles (4.0 km) northeast of Hamilton, New York. The lake is 261 acres (1.06 km^{2}), consisting of two basins which are separated by a causeway and interconnected by a culvert. The northern basin is 79 acres (0.32 km^{2}) and is relatively shallow with a maximum depth of 12 feet (3.7 m) and average depth of 3.7 feet (1.1 m). The larger southern basin is 172 acres (0.70 km^{2}) and has a maximum depth of 45 feet (14 m) and an average depth of 17.7 feet (5.4 m). Payne Brook is the lake's outflow that flows into the Chenango River.

== Fishing ==
- The fish species in Lake Moraine are largemouth bass, smallmouth bass, chain pickerel, brook trout, rainbow trout, tiger muskie, walleye, black crappie, pumpkinseed sunfish, bluegill, brown trout, redbreast sunfish, rock bass, brown bullhead, golden shiner, white sucker and creek chubsucker( Perch). The reservoir is well known for producing large chain pickerel up to 24".
- Lake Moraine is stocked yearly by the NYSDEC with approximately 780 tiger musky. The Lake Moraine Association has started an experimental walleye fingerling stocking in the reservoir in an attempt to reduce the number of panfish. With fewer panfish the number of aquatic invertebrates that feed on Eurasian watermilfoil should increase in the reservoir thus helping to control the watermilfoil naturally.
- There is a state owned concrete ramp and carry down boat launch on County Route 87 (East Lake Road), 3 miles south of Madison, New York.
