= Payne Brook =

- Location of the mouth of Payne Brook Payne Brook (the United States)

Location
- Country: United States
- State: New York
- Region: Central New York
- County: Madison

Physical characteristics
- Source
  - location: Southeast of Hamilton
  - coordinates: 42°52′47″N 75°27′50″W
- Mouth: Chenango River
  - location: By Randallsville
  - coordinates: 42°47′17″N 75°33′57″W
  - elevation: 1,079 ft (329 m)
- Basin size: 34.9 sq mi (90 km^{2})

Payne Brook is a river that begins southeast of the Village of Madison in Madison County, New York. It flows west then turns southwest before flowing into Lake Moraine. It then exits the lake and flows southwest through the Village of Hamilton, flowing through Taylor Lake in the village, before converging with the Chenango River by Randallsville.
