= Phelps Creek =

Location
- Country: US

Physical characteristics
- Source
  - location: unnamed pond in Fenton, New York
  - elevation: ~1,552 ft (473 m)
- Mouth
  - location: Chenango River in Port Dickinson, New York
  - coordinates: 42°8′23″N 75°53′53″W
- Length: 4 mi (6.4 km)
- Basin size: 3.2 mi^{2} (8.3 km^{2})

Phelps Creek is a river in Fenton, New York, United States. It is approximately four miles (6.4 km) in length, with a watershed of 3.2 square miles (8.3 km^{2}). Its origin is a pond in Fenton, and its mouth is the Chenango River in Port Dickinson. The river has a United States Geological Service monitoring station.

== See also ==
- List of rivers in New York
