= Sangerfield River =

Location
- Country: United States
- State: New York
- Region: Central New York

Physical characteristics
- Mouth: Chenango River
  - location: Earlville, New York, United States
  - coordinates: 42°43′02″N 75°32′30″W
  - elevation: 1,060 ft (320 m)
- Basin size: 61.4 mi^{2} (159 km^{2})

The Sangerfield River flows into the Chenango River by Earlville, New York.
