= Bevier-Wright House =

Historic house in New York, United States

- U.S. National Register of Historic Places
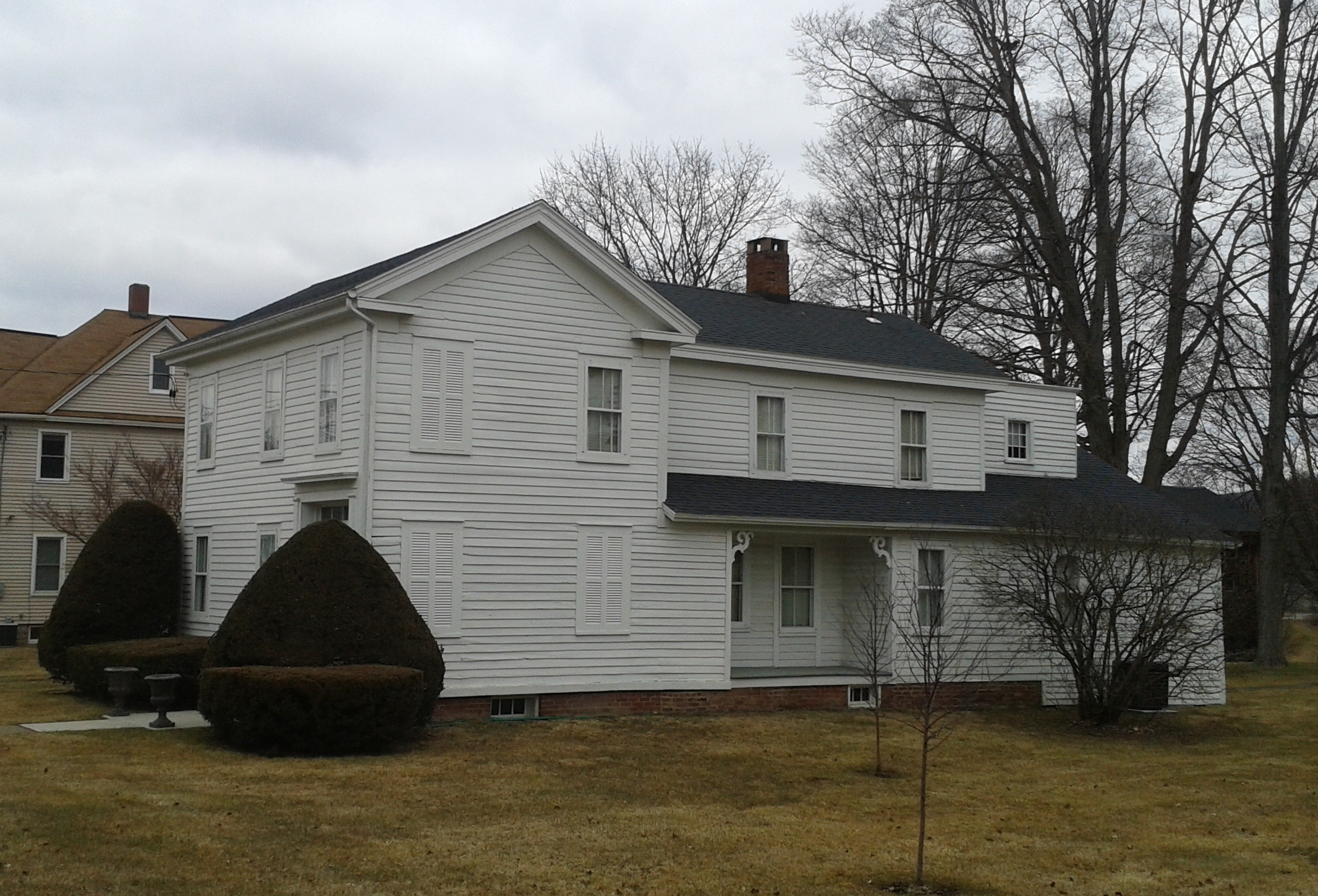
- Bevier-Wright House, February, 2012

- Location within New York Location within the United States
- Location: 776 Chenango Street, Port Dickinson, New York
- Coordinates: 42°8′14.82″N 75°53′41.32″W
- Area: 2 acres (0.81 ha)
- Architectural style: Greek Revival
- NRHP reference No.: 08000446
- Added to NRHP: May 21, 2008

The Bevier-Wright House is a historic house located at 776 Chenango Street in Port Dickinson, Broome County, New York.

== Description and history ==
It was built in about 1853, and consists of three sections: a 2-story, three-by-two-bay main block; a narrower 2-story, three-bay-deep, cross-gabled perpendicular wing; and a 1 1/2-story, three-bay rear wing. The frame house reflects the Greek Revival style. Also on the property is a 1 1/2-story barn with a gable roof.

It was listed on the National Register of Historic Places on May 21, 2008.

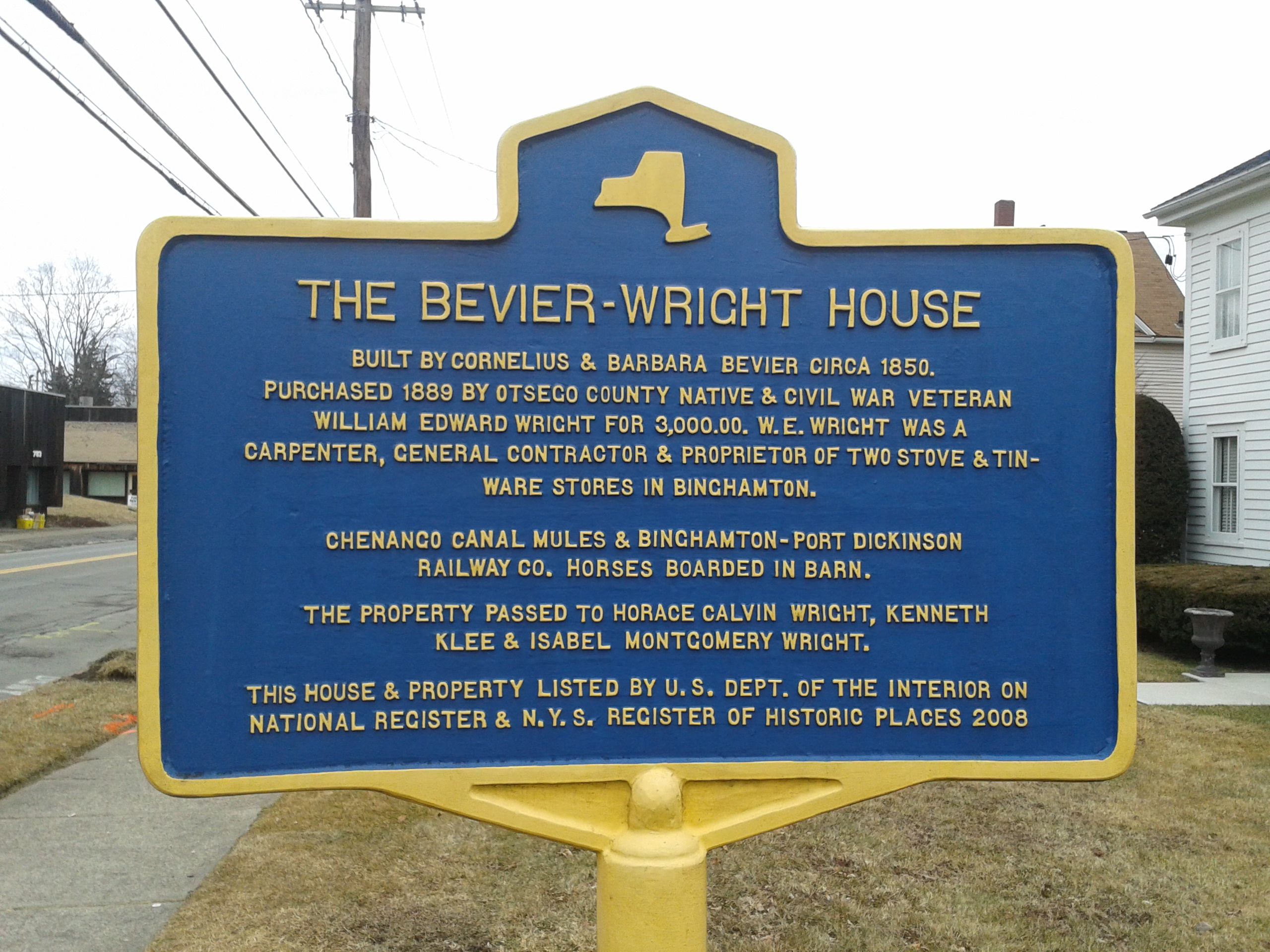
National Register sign in front of Bevier-Wright House, February 2012
