= Madison, New York =

- Town
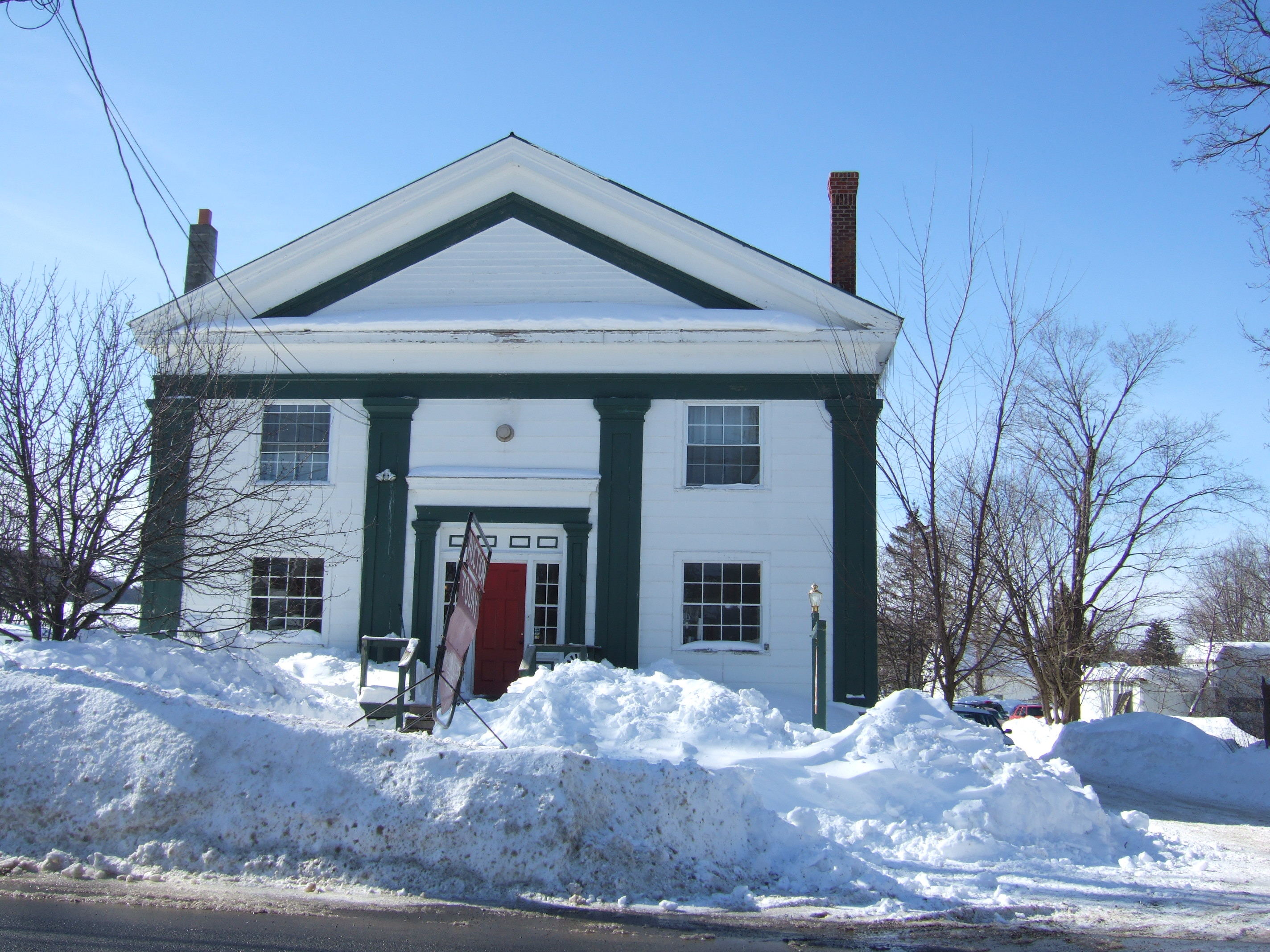

- Location within New York Location within the United States
- Coordinates: 42°54′03″N 075°30′55″W
- Country: United States
- State: New York
- County: Madison

Government
  - Town Supervisor: Gregory M. Reuter (R)
  - Town Council: Members: Patricia J. Bikowsky (R); James E. Lundrigan (R); Gregory M. Reuter (R); Bradley A. Dixon (D)

Area
  - Total: 41.36 sq mi (107.13 km^{2})
  - Land: 40.79 sq mi (105.64 km^{2})
  - Water: 0.58 sq mi (1.49 km^{2})

Population (2020)
  - Total: 2,766
  - Density: 67.8/sq mi (26.2/km^{2})
- Time zone: UTC-5 (EST)
  - Summer (DST): UTC-4 (EDT)
- ZIP Codes: 13402 (Madison); 13310 (Bouckville); 13346 (Hamilton); 13355 (Hubbardsville); 13480 (Waterville); 13425 (Oriskany Falls)
- FIPS code: 36-053-44435
- Website: www.townofmadisonny.org

Madison is a town in Madison County, New York, United States. The population was 2,766 at the 2020 census. The village of Madison is the largest community within the town. Madison, along with the rest of Madison County, is part of the Syracuse Metropolitan Area.

== History ==
Settlement began circa 1794. The town was formed in 1807 from a portion of the town of Hamilton. Darwin D. Martin, a Larkin Company executive, was born in Bouckville in 1865.

The Madison Wind Farm was built in 2000.

== Geography ==
Madison is in southeastern Madison County, with its northern and eastern town lines following the border of Oneida County. U.S. Route 20, conjoined with State Routes 12B and 26, forms an east-west highway across the town. US 20 leads west 7 miles (11 km) to Morrisville and east 15 miles (24 km) to Bridgewater. State Route 12B leads south from US 20 5 miles (8 km) to Hamilton and northeast from Madison village 18 miles (29 km) to New Hartford, near Utica. State Route 26 leads north from Madison village 26 miles (42 km) to Rome and southwest 16 miles (26 km) to Georgetown.

According to the U.S. Census Bureau, the town of Madison has a total area of 41.4 square miles (107 km^{2}), of which 40.8 square miles (106 km^{2}) are land and 0.6 square miles (1.6 km^{2}), or 1.39%, are water. Lake Moraine is in the southern part of town, while the smaller Madison Lake is just northwest of Madison village.

== Demographics ==
Historical population
| Census | Pop. | Note | %± |
|---|---|---|---|
| 1820 | 2,420 | | — |
| 1830 | 2,544 | | 5.1% |
| 1840 | 2,344 | | −7.9% |
| 1850 | 2,405 | | 2.6% |
| 1860 | 2,457 | | 2.2% |
| 1870 | 2,402 | | −2.2% |
| 1880 | 2,474 | | 3.0% |
| 1890 | 2,316 | | −6.4% |
| 1900 | 2,024 | | −12.6% |
| 1910 | 1,926 | | −4.8% |
| 1920 | 1,629 | | −15.4% |
| 1930 | 1,515 | | −7.0% |
| 1940 | 1,592 | | 5.1% |
| 1950 | 1,615 | | 1.4% |
| 1960 | 1,915 | | 18.6% |
| 1970 | 2,221 | | 16.0% |
| 1980 | 2,314 | | 4.2% |
| 1990 | 2,774 | | 19.9% |
| 2000 | 2,801 | | 1.0% |
| 2010 | 3,008 | | 7.4% |
| 2020 | 2,766 | | −8.0% |
U.S. Decennial Census

As of the census of 2000, there were 2,801 people, 1,129 households, and 779 families residing in the town. The population density was 68.5 inhabitants per square mile (26.4/km^{2}). There were 1,325 housing units at an average density of 32.4 per square mile (12.5/km^{2}). The racial makeup of the town was 97.82% White, 0.32% Black or African American, 0.11% Native American, 0.61% Asian, 0.14% Pacific Islander, 0.21% from other races, and 0.79% from two or more races. Hispanic or Latino of any race were 0.75% of the population.

There were 1,129 households, out of which 30.4% had children under the age of 18 living with them, 57.0% were married couples living together, 8.4% had a female householder with no husband present, and 31.0% were non-families. 23.5% of all households were made up of individuals, and 9.7% had someone living alone who was 65 years of age or older. The average household size was 2.47 and the average family size was 2.93.

In the town, the population was spread out, with 24.8% under the age of 18, 7.4% from 18 to 24, 28.0% from 25 to 44, 25.7% from 45 to 64, and 14.1% who were 65 years of age or older. The median age was 39 years. For every 100 females, there were 100.8 males. For every 100 females age 18 and over, there were 97.1 males.

The median income for a household in the town was $35,889, and the median income for a family was $41,630. Males had a median income of $29,487 versus $23,750 for females. The per capita income for the town was $18,468. About 9.6% of families and 13.0% of the population were below the poverty line, including 19.5% of those under age 18 and 6.7% of those age 65 or over.

== Communities and locations in the town ==
- Bouckville – A hamlet near the western town line on Route 20. The Chenango Canal Summit Level and Coolidge Stores Building are listed on the National Register of Historic Places.
- Durfee Corners – A location in the southeastern part of the town.
- Lake Moraine – A lake south of Madison village.
- Madison – The Village of Madison on Route 20.
- Madison Center – A hamlet southeast of Madison village.
- Sigby Corners – A hamlet in the southern part of the town.
- Solsville – A hamlet north of Madison village.

== Notable people ==
- Thomas Bones (1842–1929), land developer in the area
- Louise C. Purington (1844-1916), physician and temperance activist
