= Fortnightly of Chicago =

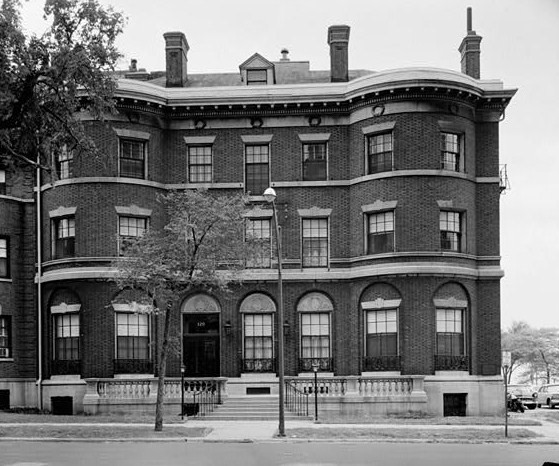
- Formation: 1876
- Founder: Kate Newell Doggett
- Founded at: Chicago, Illinois
- Type: Woman's club
- Website: fortnightlychicago.org

The Fortnightly of Chicago is a woman's club founded in Chicago in 1873 by Kate Newell Doggett. It is the oldest women's association in Chicago.

Kate Newell Doggett served as the first president from 1873 through 1879. Early members include Jane Addams, Janet H. Ayer, Amanda M. Bliss, Susan M. Hamilton, Ellen Martin Henrotin, Ellen R. Jewitt, Mary Hunt Loomis, Emily (Mrs. Franklin) MacVeagh, Bertha Palmer, and Mary Wilmarth.

In 1922, the Fortnightly purchased the Lathrop House at 120 E Bellevue Place from Helen Aldis Lathrop. The club still occupies that building, which was listed on the National Register of Historic Places in 1974.
