= Kate Newell Doggett =

American botanist and suffragette (1828–1884)

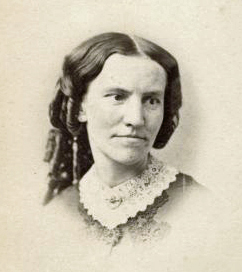
- Born: Kate Newell; November 5, 1827; Charlotte, Vermont
- Died: March 13, 1884 (aged 56)
- Occupations: Botanist, Translator, Club Woman

Kate Newell Doggett (1827–1884) was an American botanist and suffragist.

== Biography ==
Kate Newell was born November 5, 1827 to George and Caroline (Bradley) Newell in Charlotte, Vermont.

In 1869 Doggett was placed charge of the herbarium at the Academy of Science. She was delegate of the National Woman Suffrage Association. In 1873 Doggett established the women's club the Fortnightly of Chicago. It is the oldest women's association in Chicago. In 1874 Doggett translated the French book The Grammar of Painting and Engraving into English.

Doggett died in 1884.
