= United States Post Office (Hamilton, New York) =

- US Post Office-Hamilton
- U.S. National Register of Historic Places
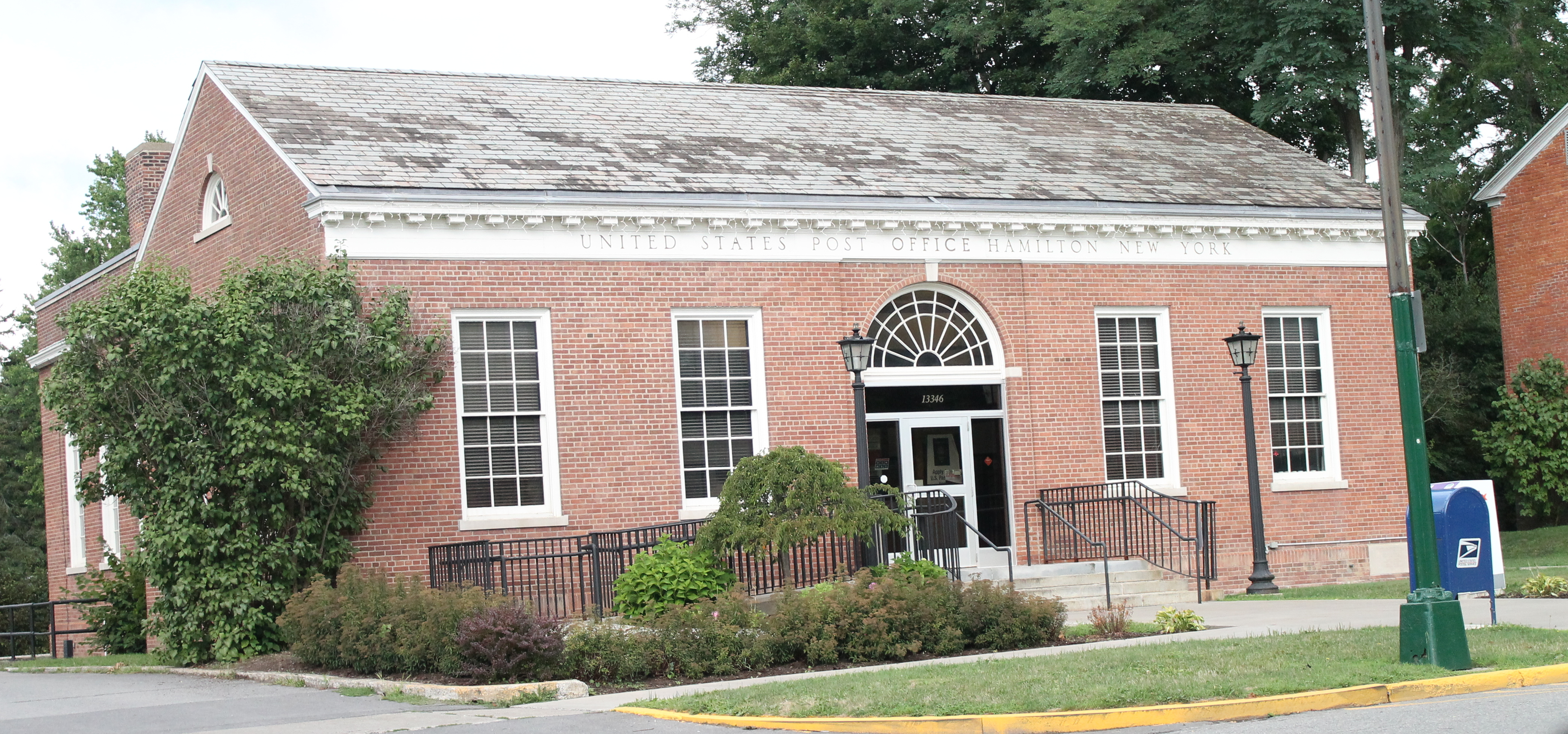

- Location within New York Location within the United States
- Location: 32 Broad St., Hamilton, New York
- Coordinates: 42°49′32.9″N 75°32′38.4″W
- Area: less than one acre
- Built: 1936
- Architect: Simon, Louis A.; Albrizio, Humbert
- Architectural style: Colonial Revival
- MPS: US Post Offices in New York State, 1858-1943, TR
- NRHP reference No.: 88002522
- Added to NRHP: May 11, 1989

US Post Office-Hamilton is a historic post office building located at Hamilton in Madison County, New York, United States. It was designed and built in 1936, and is one of a number of post offices in New York State designed by the Office of the Supervising Architect of the Treasury Department, Louis A. Simon. It is a one-story, five bay steel frame building with a raised poured concrete foundation and brick watercourse in the Colonial Revival style.

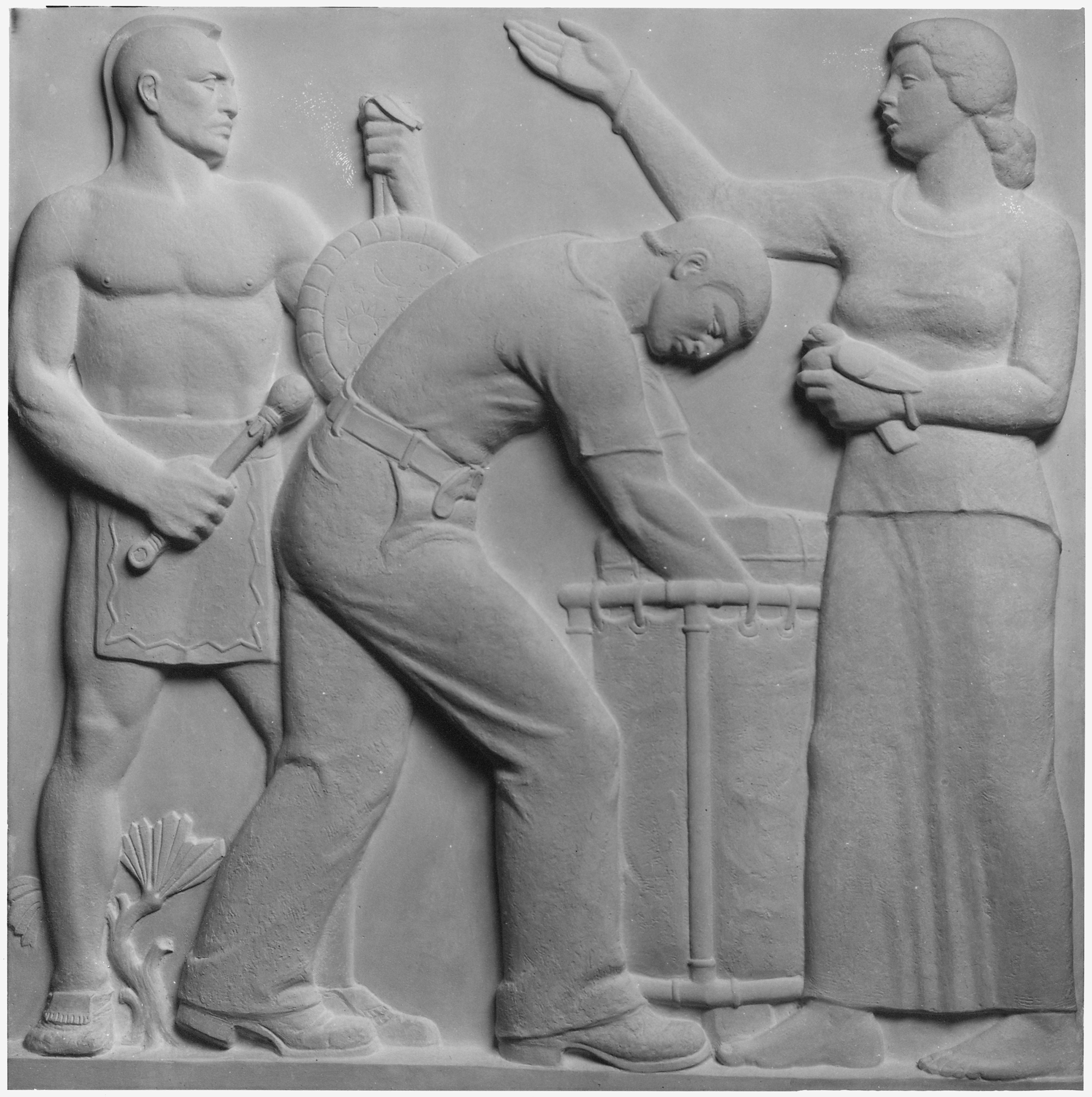
The Messengers (1938), terracotta relief by Humbert Albrizio installed in the post office lobby

The interior features a 1938 relief sculpture by Humbert Albrizio titled "The Messengers."

It was listed on the National Register of Historic Places in 1989.
