= Coolidge Stores Building =

Historic commercial building in New York, United States

- U.S. National Register of Historic Places
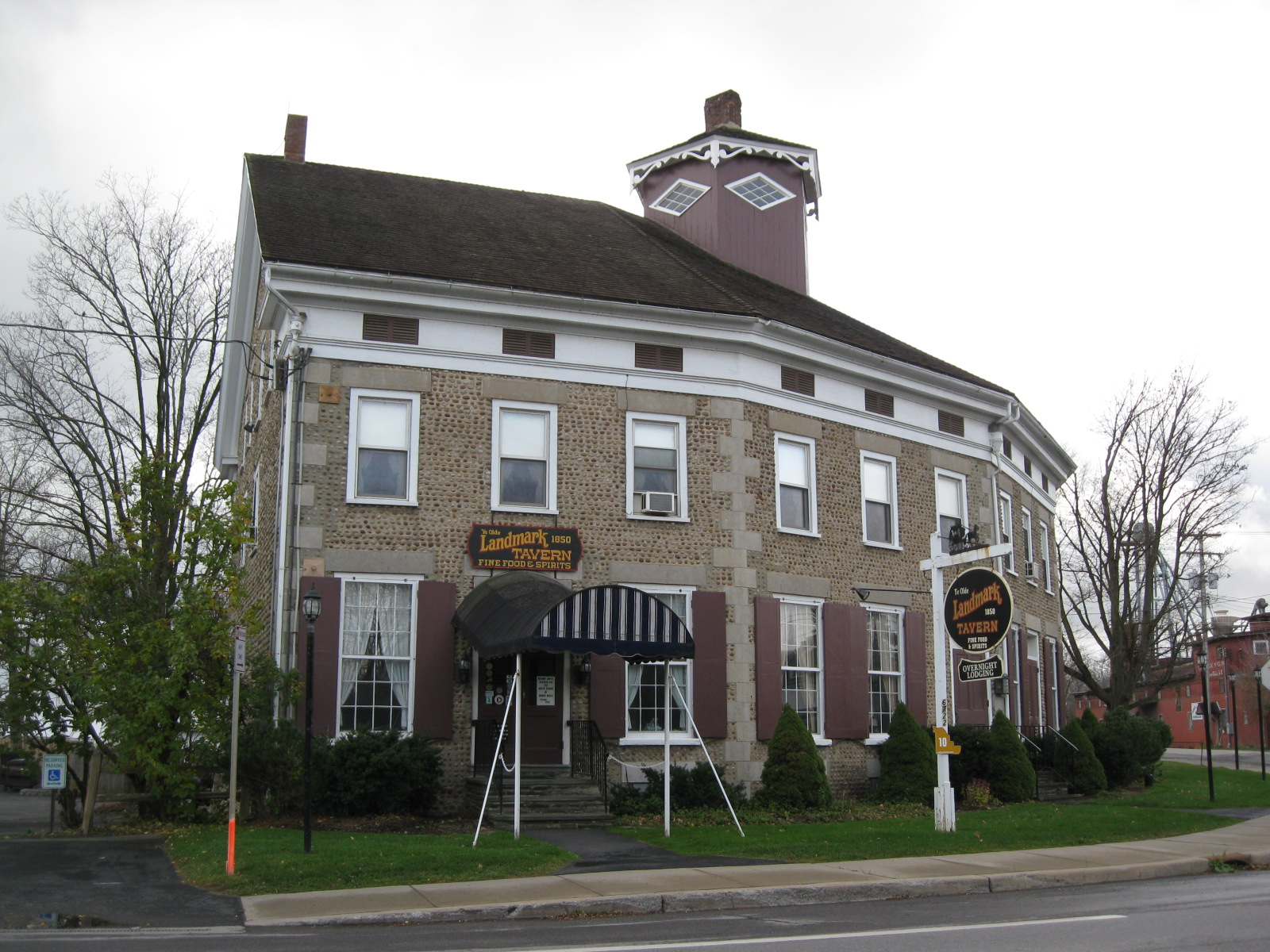
- Coolidge Stores Building, November 2009

- Location within New York Location within the United States
- Location: US 20, Bouckville, New York
- Coordinates: 42°53′21″N 75°33′7″W
- Area: less than one acre
- Built: 1851
- Architectural style: Greek Revival
- MPS: Cobblestone Architecture of New York State MPS
- NRHP reference No.: 00001686
- Added to NRHP: January 26, 2001

The Coolidge Stores Building (also known as Landmark Tavern) is a historic commercial building located on US 20 in Bouckville, Madison County, New York.

== Description and history ==
It is a 2 1/2 story, Greek Revival style cobblestone building constructed in 1851. It is irregular in plan, featuring four, three-bay wide facades arranged in an arc of less than 90-degrees. Each of the four segments corresponds to an original store space with a wedge shaped floor plan. An unusual hexagonal cupola rises from the center of the roof.

It was listed on the National Register of Historic Places on January 26, 2001.

== See also ==
- James Coolidge Octagon Cobblestone House
