= Adon Smith House =

Historic house in New York, United States

- U.S. National Register of Historic Places
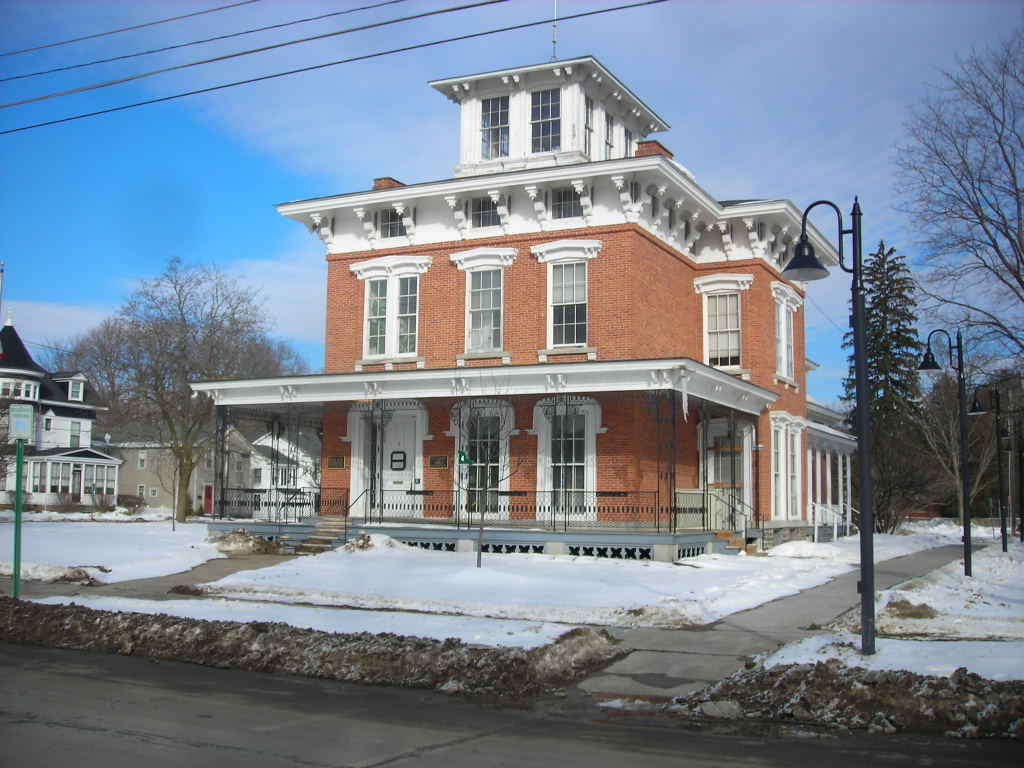
- Adon Smith House, February 2007

- Location within New York Location within the United States
- Location: 3 Broad St., Hamilton, New York
- Coordinates: 42°49′37″N 75°32′36″W
- Area: less than one acre
- Built: 1850
- Architectural style: Italianate
- NRHP reference No.: 74001256
- Added to NRHP: May 2, 1974

Adon Smith House is a historic home located at Hamilton in Madison County, New York. It was built about 1850 and is a 2 1/2-story brick dwelling with Italianate elements. It features a U-shaped porch with elaborate wrought iron columns and railings and has a glazed belvedere. It is now used as the village office building.

It was added to the National Register of Historic Places in 1974.
