= Chenango River =

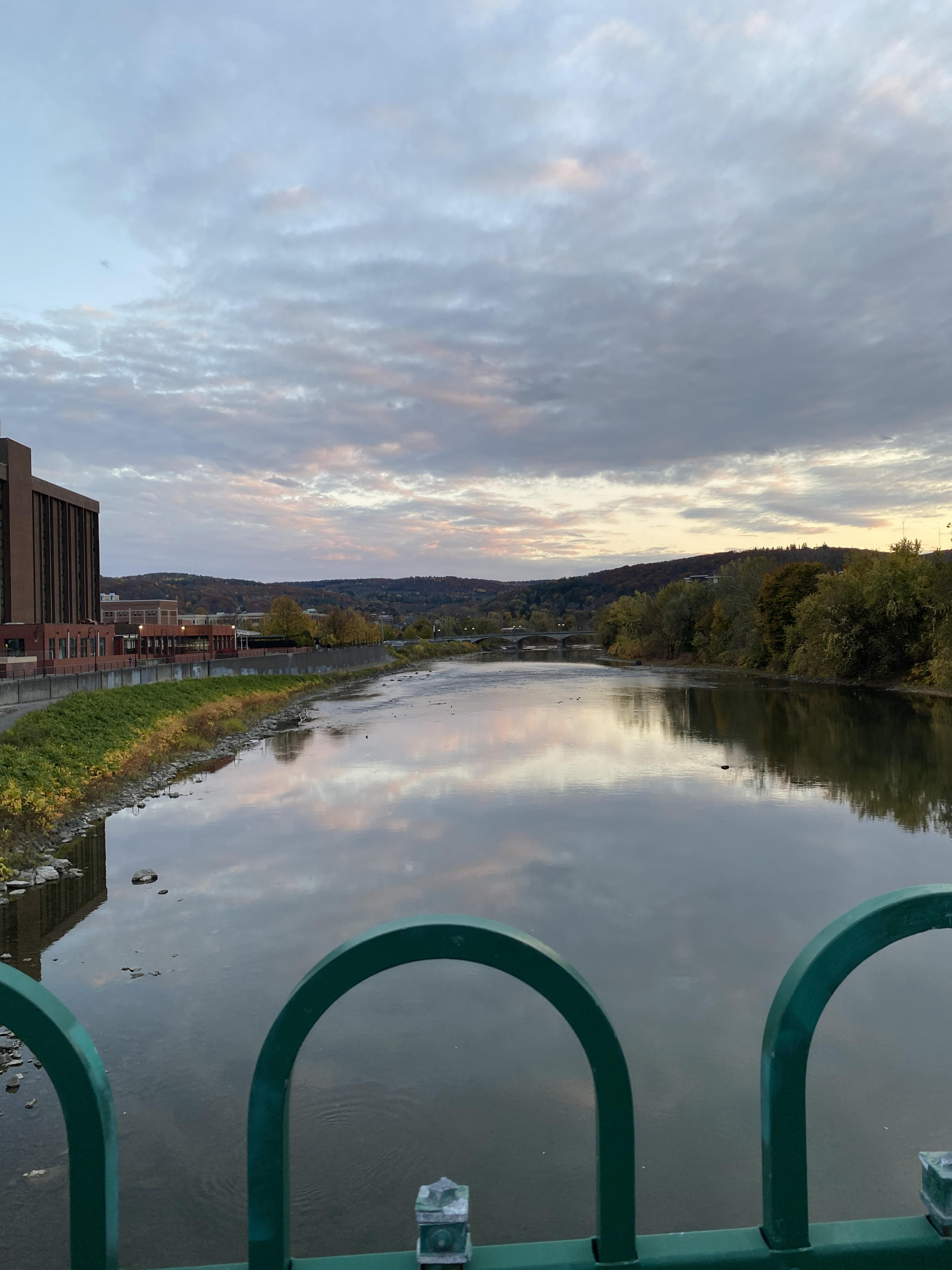
- Chenango River from Court Street Bridge in Binghamton, New York, near its confluence with the Susquehanna River

Location
- Country: United States
- State: New York

Physical characteristics
- Source: Campbell Lakes, Morrisville Swamp
  - location: Morrisville, Madison County, New York, United States
  - coordinates: 42°56′23″N 75°40′06″W
  - elevation: 1,290 ft (390 m)
- Mouth: Susquehanna River
  - location: Binghamton, Broome County, New York, New York, United States
  - coordinates: 42°05′32″N 75°55′02″W
  - elevation: 820 ft (250 m)
- Length: 90 mi (140 km)
- Basin size: 1,582 mi^{2} (4,100 km^{2})
- Discharge
  - location: Chenango Forks, New York
  - minimum: 125 cu ft/s (3.5 m^{3}/s)
  - maximum: 8,770 cu ft/s (248 m^{3}/s)

Basin features
- Tributaries
  - left: Payne Brook, Sangerfield River, Mad Brook, West Brook, Whapanaka Brook, Thompson Creek, Ransford Creek, Glen Road Brook, Wheeler Brook, Page Brook Creek, Osborne Creek, Phelps Creek
  - right: Callahan Brook, Electric Light Stream, Eaton Brook, Bradley Brook, Kingsley Brook, Stone Mill Brook, Cold Spring Brook, Fly Creek, Cold Brook, Canasawacta Creek, Gilmore Brook, Fly Meadow Creek, Mill Brook, Bowman Creek, Tillotson Creek, Spring Brook, Genegantslet Creek, Ockerman Brook, Tioughnioga River, Thomas Creek, Castle Creek, Cutler Creek

The Chenango River is a 90-mile-long (140 km) tributary of the Susquehanna River in central New York in the United States. It drains a dissected plateau area in upstate New York at the northern end of the Susquehanna watershed.

Named after the Oneida word for bull thistle, in the 19th century the Chenango furnished a critical link in the canal system of the northeastern United States. The Chenango Canal, built from 1836–1837 between Utica and Binghamton, connected the Erie Canal in the north to the Susquehanna River. The canal was rendered obsolete by railroads and was abandoned in 1878.

Flooding is often a concern during the spring and fall.

== Course ==
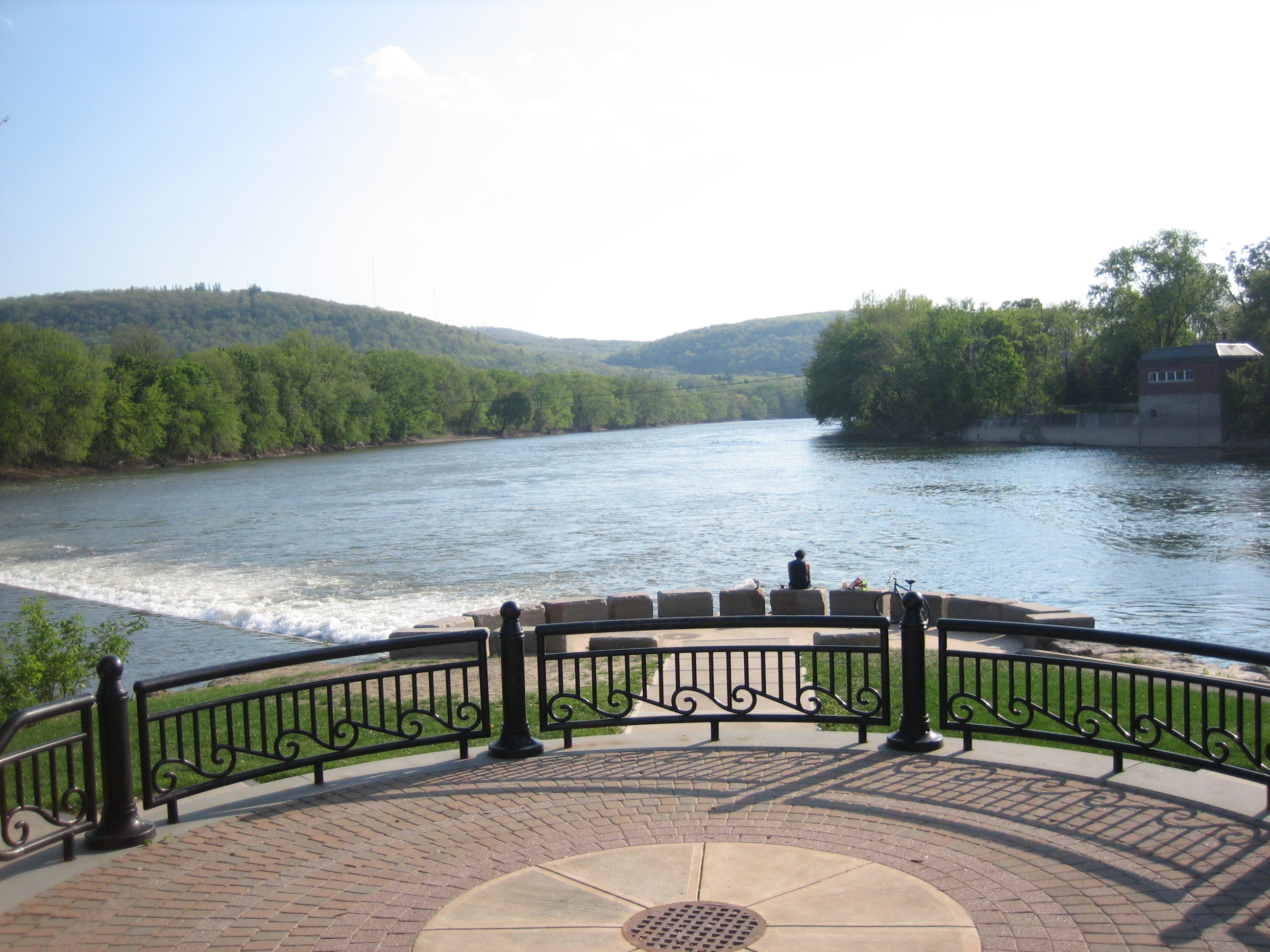
The confluence of the Chenango River (right) and Susquehanna River (left) at Confluence Park in Downtown, Binghamton, NY.

The Chenango River begins near Morrisville in Madison County, in central New York, in the Morrisville Swamp in the Town of Smithfield, about 25 miles southwest of Utica. The river flows from the Campbell Lakes in the swamp, from waters flowing in from the Smithfield Hills to the north and west and a series of cliffs called "The Ledges" to the north and east. It flows south-southeast through the swamp. From Morrisville, it flows south past Eaton and is paralleled by the remnants of the old Chenango Canal from Randallsville, just south of Hamilton, to just north of Earlville where the old canal joined the river. Continuing south the Chenango is joined by the Sangerfield River, also known as the East Branch of the Chenango, just south of Earlville. Then it flows south past Sherburne to Norwich, where it turns southwest. At Oxford it turns south, and at Warn Lake it again turns southwest. It flows past Brisben and Greene to Chenango Forks, where, about nine miles north of Binghamton, it receives from the right its major tributary, the Tioughnioga River. It ends where it joins the Susquehanna from the north in downtown Binghamton in Broome County. Its overall length is about 90 miles.

== Tributaries ==
Right

- Callahan Brook
- Electric Light Stream
- Eaton Brook
- Bradley Brook
- Kingsley Brook
- Stone Mill Brook
- Cold Spring Brook
- Fly Creek
- Cold Brook
- Canasawacta Creek
- Gilmore Brook
- Fly Meadow Creek
- Mill Brook
- Bowman Creek
- Tillotson Creek
- Spring Brook
- Genegantslet Creek
- Ockerman Brook
- Tioughnioga River
- Thomas Creek
- Castle Creek
- Cutler Creek

Left

- Payne Brook
- Sangerfield River
- Mad Brook
- West Brook
- Whapanaka Brook
- Thompson Creek
- Ransford Creek
- Glen Road Brook
- Wheeler Brook
- Page Brook Creek
- Osborne Creek
- Phelps Creek

== See also ==
- List of New York rivers
