= Madison (village), New York =

Madison, New York
- Village
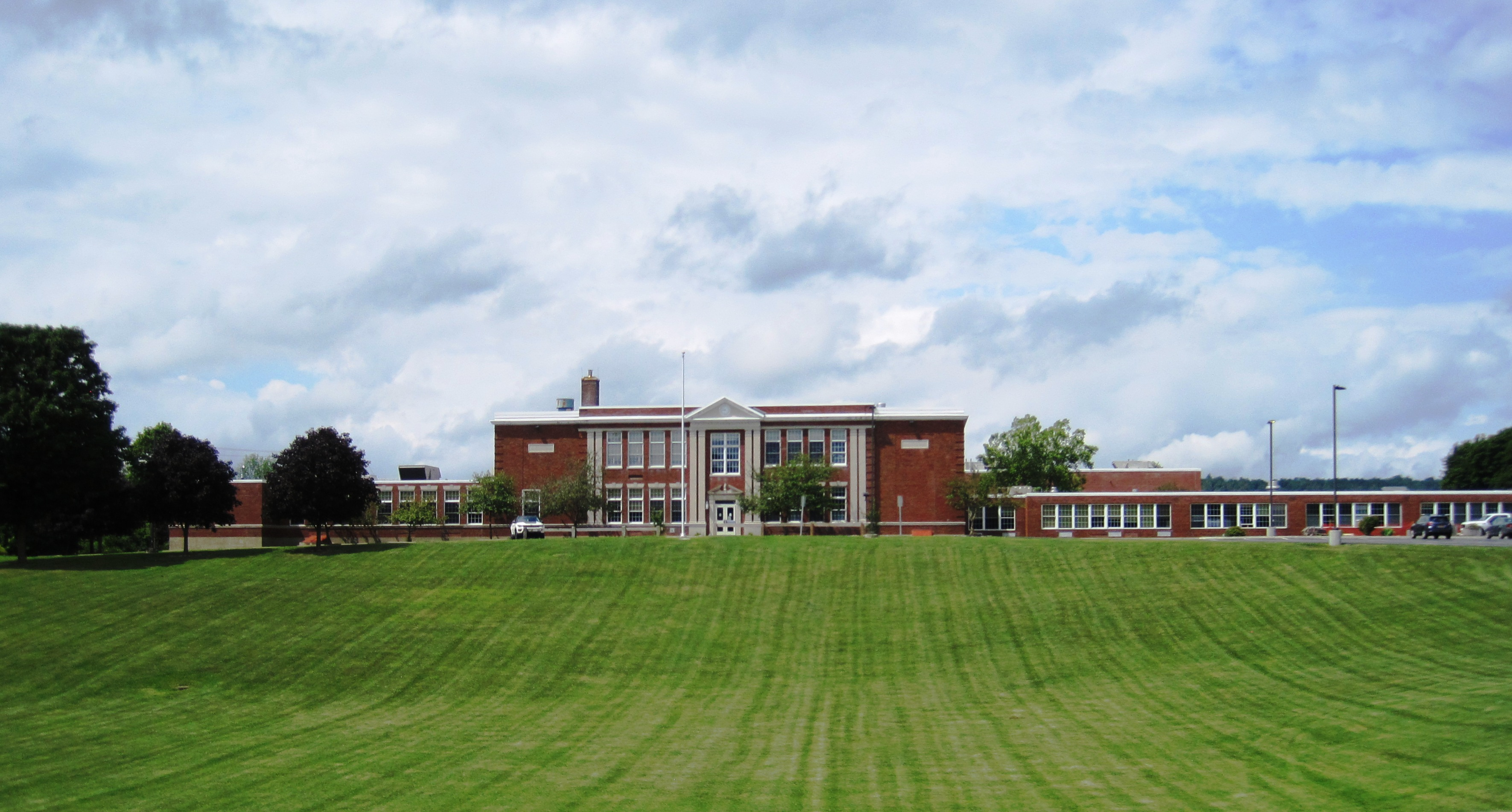
- Madison Central School in the village

- Location within New York Location within the United States
- Coordinates: 42°54′3″N 75°30′55″W
- Country: United States
- State: New York
- County: Madison
- Town: Madison

Government
  - Mayor: Barbara Clark

Area
  - Total: 0.48 sq mi (1.24 km^{2})
  - Land: 0.48 sq mi (1.24 km^{2})
  - Water: 0 sq mi (0.00 km^{2})
- Elevation: 1,204 ft (367 m)

Population (2020)
  - Total: 311
  - Density: 651.4/sq mi (251.49/km^{2})
- Time zone: UTC-5 (Eastern (EST))
  - Summer (DST): UTC-4 (EDT)
- ZIP Code: 13402
- Area code: 315
- FIPS code: 36-44424
- GNIS feature ID: 0956252

Madison is a village in Madison County, New York, United States. The population was 311 at the 2020 census. The village and its town are named after President James Madison.

The village is in the central part of the town of Madison on US Route 20.

== History ==
The village was incorporated in 1826. Located on the Third Great Western Turnpike, the village was on a busy thoroughfare for east–west travelers and featured a hotel and resort on Madison Lake. Many visitors came from the nearby hamlet of Solsville, where the Chenango Canal and the railroad both had stations.

Madison is well-known for the Madison-Bouckville Antique Show, which takes place annually in August. The area sees over 1,000 antique dealers plus tens of thousands of buyers who travel to Madison.

In 2000, Solsville, a half-mile north of Madison, became part of the town of Madison. Solsville is known for its historic Solsville Hotel, which was at one point the town post office, saloon, and ballroom, as well as the old canal house.

== Notable people ==
- Phineas L. Tracy (1786–1876), US congressman

== Geography ==
Madison village is located in eastern Madison County at 42°54′2″N 75°30′54″W (42.900775, -75.515153), in the north-central part of the town of Madison. U.S. Route 20 and New York State 26 pass concurrently through the village, US 20 leading east 14 miles (23 km) to Bridgewater and west 18 miles (29 km) to Cazenovia, while NY 26 leads north 26 miles (42 km) to Rome and southwest 16 miles (26 km) to Georgetown.

According to the U.S. Census Bureau, the village of Madison has a total area of 0.5 square miles (1.3 km^{2}), all land. The village drains northward toward Oriskany Creek, which flows northeast toward the Mohawk River near Utica.

== Demographics ==
Historical population
| Census | Pop. | Note | %± |
|---|---|---|---|
| 1880 | 320 | | — |
| 1890 | 390 | | 21.9% |
| 1900 | 321 | | −17.7% |
| 1910 | 309 | | −3.7% |
| 1920 | 265 | | −14.2% |
| 1930 | 287 | | 8.3% |
| 1940 | 300 | | 4.5% |
| 1950 | 335 | | 11.7% |
| 1960 | 327 | | −2.4% |
| 1970 | 386 | | 18.0% |
| 1980 | 396 | | 2.6% |
| 1990 | 316 | | −20.2% |
| 2000 | 315 | | −0.3% |
| 2010 | 305 | | −3.2% |
| 2020 | 311 | | 2.0% |
U.S. Decennial Census

As of the census of 2000, there were 315 people, 138 households, and 77 families residing in the village. The population density was 626.5 inhabitants per square mile (241.9/km^{2}). There were 151 housing units at an average density of 300.3 per square mile (115.9/km^{2}). The racial makeup of the village was 99.68% White and 0.32% Asian. Hispanic or Latino of any race were 0.63% of the population.

There were 138 households, out of which 26.1% had children under the age of 18 living with them, 44.2% were married couples living together, 9.4% had a female householder with no husband present, and 43.5% were non-families. 36.2% of all households were made up of individuals, and 14.5% had someone living alone who was 65 years of age or older. The average household size was 2.28 and the average family size was 3.01.

In the village, the population was spread out, with 24.4% under the age of 18, 7.0% from 18 to 24, 29.2% from 25 to 44, 23.2% from 45 to 64, and 16.2% who were 65 years of age or older. The median age was 38 years. For every 100 females, there were 87.5 males. For every 100 females age 18 and over, there were 83.1 males.

The median income for a household in the village was $27,250, and the median income for a family was $37,708. Males had a median income of $28,125 versus $21,786 for females. The per capita income for the village was $16,960. About 9.9% of families and 12.9% of the population were below the poverty line, including 7.6% of those under age 18 and 3.7% of those age 65 or over.
